= U.S. Route 25 in Ohio =

Former section of U.S. Numbered Highway in Ohio, United States

U.S. Route 25
- Former routing of US 25 prior to its decommissioning in Ohio denoted in red

Route information
- Maintained by ODOT
- Length: 208.18 mi (Note: Found by adding lengths of the section concurrent with I-75, the section that is now OH 25, and the section changed to US 24, with distances found in the 1975 Traffic Survey Report. http://www.dot.state.oh.us/Divisions/Planning/TechServ/traffic/Traffic_Survey_Reports/1982_Reports/Luc82.pdf) (335.03 km)
- Existed: November 11, 1926–September 26, 1973
- History: Replaced by I-75

Major junctions
- South end: US 25 in Covington, KY
- US 50 in Cincinnati; I-275 in Cincinnati; US 35 in Dayton; I-70 in Dayton; US 40 in Vandalia; US 30S in Lima; US 30N in Beaverdam; I-475 / US 23 near Perrysburg; US 20 in Perrysburg; I-75 in Toledo
- North end: US 25 near Erie, Michigan

Location
- Country: United States
- State: Ohio
- Counties: Hamilton, Butler, Warren, Montgomery, Miami, Shelby, Auglaize, Allen, Hancock, Wood, Lucas

Highway system
- United States Numbered Highway System; List; Special; Divided; Ohio State Highway System; Interstate; US; State; Scenic
← SR 24	→ SR 25

US Highway 25 (US 25) was a part of the United States Numbered Highway System in the state of Ohio that ran from its present terminus near Covington, Kentucky, to its Michigan continuation. By the time it was decommissioned in 1973, all but the section north of Cygnet ran concurrently with Interstate 75 (I-75).

== History ==
Before the U.S. Route system was established in 1926, the road that became US 25 was mostly numbered as State Route 6 (SR 6), but was numbered as SR 28 and SR 124 in the Cincinnati area. The route that became US 25 was also part of the eastern leg of the Dixie Highway. In 1950s and 1960s, US 25 was transferred to a new freeway that was the basis for I-75. Nearly all of the original road remains intact, however, still named Dixie Highway in some parts, and with some segments given county highway designations of CR-25A.

In 1973, the route was decommissioned in Ohio and Michigan due to its redundancy with Interstate highways. From Cygnet northward, the independent routing of US 25, up to its concurrency with US 24 at the intersection of Detroit Avenue and Cherry Street, became the whole of SR 25. The former concurrency to Telegraph Road retained the US 24 designation, while the remaining segment of Detroit Avenue northward to the state line was decommissioned as a state highway, continuing into Michigan as M-125/Dixie Highway. In 1986, the segment of SR 25 along Detroit Avenue was swapped with US 24, with the state route taking a new alignment from downtown Toledo to I-280.

== Major intersections ==
County	Location	mi	km	Old exit	New exit	Destinations	Notes
Ohio River		0.00	0.00			I-75 south / I-71 south / US 25 south – Lexington, Louisville	Continuation into Kentucky
Ohio River		0.00	0.00	Brent Spence Bridge; Kentucky–Ohio state line			
Hamilton	Cincinnati	0.22	0.35	1	1A	I-71 north / US 50 east (Fort Washington Way) to I-471 south / US 52 east / Second Street – Columbus, Downtown Cincinnati, Riverfront	North end of I-71 overlap; was exit
Hamilton	Cincinnati	0.50	0.80	2	1E	Fifth Street, Central Avenue (US 22 / US 27 / US 42 / US 52 / US 127 / SR 3) – Downtown Cincinnati	No southbound entrance
Hamilton	Cincinnati	0.63	1.01	3	1G	US 50 west (River Road, Sixth Street Expressway, SR 264 west) / Linn Street	
Hamilton	Cincinnati	0.71	1.14	4	1F	Seventh Street	
Hamilton	Cincinnati	1.24	2.00	5	1G	To US 50 west / Freeman Avenue	Southbound exit and northbound entrance
Hamilton	Cincinnati	1.44	2.32	6	1H	Lincoln Park Drive	No northbound exit, but ramp
Hamilton	Cincinnati	1.72	2.77	7	2A	Western Avenue, Liberty Street	Southbound exit and northbound entrance
Hamilton	Cincinnati	2.51	4.04	8	2B	Harrison Avenue (Western Hills Viaduct)	
Hamilton	Cincinnati	3.50	5.63	9	3	US 27 south / US 52 east / US 127 / Hopple Street	South end of US 27/US 52 overlap
Hamilton	Cincinnati	4.23	6.81	10	4	I-74 west / US 27 north / US 52 west – Indianapolis	I-74 exit 20; north end of US 27/US 52 overlap.
Hamilton	Cincinnati	6.46	10.40	11	6	Mitchell Avenue – St. Bernard	
Hamilton	Cincinnati	7.81	12.57	13	7	SR 562 east to I-71 – Norwood	
Hamilton	Cincinnati	8.57	13.79	14	8	Towne Street – Elmwood Place	Northbound exit and entrance
Hamilton	Cincinnati	9.45	15.21	15	9	SR 4 (Paddock Road) to SR 561 (Seymour Avenue)	
Hamilton	Cincinnati	10.31	16.59	16	10A	SR 126 (Ronald Reagan Cross County Highway)	Southbound exit to SR 126 and northbound entrance from westbound SR 126 via exit 10
Hamilton	Arlington Heights	10.89	17.53	17	10B	Galbraith Road	Signed as exit 10 southbound
Hamilton	Lockland	11.84	19.05	18	12	Lockland, Reading	No northbound entrance; southbound right-in/right-out to Cooper Avenue and northbound exit to Davis Street
Hamilton	Evendale	12.92	20.79	19	13	Shepherd Lane, Neumann Way – Lincoln Heights	Southbound exit to Neumann Way via Exit 14; Neumann Way serves GE Aviation
Hamilton	Evendale	14.26	22.95	20	14	Glendale-Milford Road Evendale, Woodlawn	
Hamilton	Sharonville	15.39	24.77	21	15	Sharon Road – Glendale	
Hamilton	Sharonville	16.79	27.02	22	16	I-275 to I-71 / I-74 – Columbus, Indianapolis	I-275 exits 43A-B
Butler	West Chester Township	21.23	34.17	23	21	Cincinnati–Dayton Road	Former US 25
Butler	West Chester Township	22.82	36.73	24	22	Tylersville Road – Mason	
Warren	Monroe	29.10– 29.11	46.83– 46.85	25	29	SR 63 – Monroe, Lebanon, Hamilton	
Warren	Middletown	32.82	52.82	26	32	SR 122 – Middletown	
Warren	Franklin	36.89	59.37	27	36	SR 123 – Franklin, Lebanon	
Warren	Franklin–Springboro line	38.74	62.35	28	38	SR 73 – Springboro, Franklin	
Montgomery		43.51– 43.52	70.02– 70.04	29	43	I-675 north – Columbus	Directional T interchange.
Montgomery	Miamisburg	44.66	71.87	30	44	SR 725 – Centerville, Miamisburg	
Montgomery	West Carrollton	47.31	76.14	31	47	East Dixie Drive – West Carrollton, Moraine	Former US 25; Converted to full access interchange in 2012
Montgomery	Moraine	50.23	80.84	32	50A	Dryden Road	
Montgomery	Moraine	50.49	81.26		50B	SR 741 south (Springboro Pike)	Southbound exit and northbound entrance
Montgomery	Dayton	51.36	82.66	Bridge over the Great Miami River			
Montgomery	Dayton	51.70	83.20	33	51	Edwin C. Moses Boulevard, Nicholas Road	
Montgomery	Dayton	52.14– 52.56	83.91– 84.59	34	52A	Albany Street, Stewart Street	Former southbound exit and northbound entrance; closed in spring 2010 as part of I-75 Downtown Modernization
Montgomery	Dayton	52.69	84.80	35	52B	US 35 / SR 4 – Xenia, Eaton	Southern end of SR 4 concurrency; ramps to westbound US 35 and from eastbound US 35 include entrances and exits for Germantown Street
Montgomery	Dayton	53.18	85.58	Bridge over the Great Miami River			
Montgomery	Dayton	53.41	85.96	36	53	Second Street, Salem Avenue, First Street	Formerly signed as 53A (Third Street) and 53B (Salem Avenue, First Street) before interchange rebuild in 2016; no southbound access to First Street
Montgomery	Dayton	53.8	86.6	Bridge over the Great Miami River			
Montgomery	Dayton	54.22	87.26	38	54A	Grand Avenue, Riverside Drive, Main Street	Now Closed; southbound originally had two ramps to Riverside Drive which were later removed; access consolidated with newly built Main Street exit as part of I-75 Downtown Modernization
Montgomery	Dayton	54.38	87.52	39	54B	SR 48 (Main Street)	
Montgomery	Dayton	54.63	87.92	Bridge over the Great Miami River			
Montgomery	Dayton	54.84– 54.87	88.26– 88.30	40	54C	SR 4 / Webster Street, Keowee Street – Springfield	Northern terminus of SR 4 concurrency.
Montgomery	Dayton	55.28– 55.58	88.96– 89.45	41	55	Keowee Street, Leo Street	Now Closed; was signed northbound as exits 55A (Keowee Street south) and 55B (Keowee Street north, Leo Street); access to Keowee consolidated with Webster Street as part of I-75 Downtown Modernization
Montgomery	Dayton	55.95	90.04	42	56	Stanley Avenue	
Montgomery	Dayton	56.15	90.36	Bridge over the Great Miami River			
Montgomery		56.46	90.86	43	57A	Neva Drive	Former northbound exit and southbound entrance; closed with I-75 Downtown Modernization
Montgomery		56.74	91.31	44	57B	Wagner Ford Road, Siebenthaler Avenue, Neff Road	Neff Road signed southbound only; southbound exit ramp connects to Neff Road, Keats Drive, and a traffic circle which connects to Wagner Ford Road and Dixie Drive.
Montgomery		58.21	93.68	45	58	Needmore Road	
Montgomery		60.71	97.70	46	60	Little York Road	Now Closed; northbound access was via Poe Avenue and southbound access via Miller Lane; replaced by exit 59
Montgomery		61.36– 61.38	98.75– 98.78	47	61	I-70 – Indianapolis, Columbus	Signed as exits 61A (east) and 61B (west) southbound; I-70 west exit 33, east exit 33A-B
Montgomery	Vandalia	63.18	101.68	48	63	US 40 – Donnelsville, Vandalia	
Montgomery	Vandalia	63.84	102.74	49	64	Northwoods Boulevard	
Miami	Tipp City	67.96	109.37	50	68	SR 571 – Tipp City, West Milton	
Miami	Tipp City	69.74	112.24	51	69	County Road 25A	Former US 25
Miami	Troy	73.19– 73.20	117.79– 117.80	52	73	SR 55 – Ludlow Falls, Troy	
Miami	Troy	75.05	120.78	53	74	SR 41 – Troy, Covington	
Miami		78.50	126.33	54	78	County Road 25A	Former US 25
Miami		78.62	126.53	Bridge over the Great Miami River			
Miami	Piqua	82.06– 82.08	132.06– 132.09	55	82	US 36 – Urbana, Piqua	
Miami	Piqua	82.93– 83.11	133.46– 133.75	56	83	County Road 25A – Piqua	Former US 25
Shelby	Sidney	90.58	145.77	57	90	Fair Road – Sidney	
Shelby		91.96	148.00	58	92	SR 47 / I-75 BL – Sidney, Versailles	
Shelby		93.83	151.00	59	93	SR 29 – Sidney, St. Marys	
Shelby		94.73	152.45	60	94	County Road 25A Sidney	Former US 25
Shelby		99.77	160.56	61	99	SR 119 – Anna, Minster	
Shelby		102.84	165.50	62	102	SR 274 – Jackson Center, New Bremen	
Shelby		104.84	168.72	63	104	SR 219 – Botkins	
Auglaize		110.82	178.35	64	110	US 33 – St. Marys, Bellefontaine	
Auglaize	Wapakoneta	111.26	179.06	65	111	Bellefontaine Street – Wapakoneta	
Auglaize		113.02	181.89	66	113	SR 67 – Uniopolis, Wapakoneta	
Auglaize	Cridersville	118.16	190.16	67	118	National Road – Cridersville	
Allen	Fort Shawnee	120.52	193.96	68	120	Breese Road – Fort Shawnee	
Allen	Lima	122.63	197.35	69	122	SR 65 – Ottawa, Uniopolis, Lima	
Allen	Lima	124.51	200.38	70	124	Fourth Street	
Allen	Lima	125.43	201.86	71	125	US 30S / SR 117 – Lima, Kenton	
Allen		127.15	204.63	72	127	SR 81 – Ada, Lima	
Allen		130.23	209.58	73	130	Bluelick Road	
Allen		134.72	216.81	74	134	Napoleon Road	Northbound exit and southbound entrance
Allen	Beaverdam	135.69	218.37	75	135	SR 696 to US 30N – Delphos, Upper Sandusky	Lincoln Highway
Allen	Bluffton	140.52	226.15	76	140	Bentley Road (SR 103) – Bluffton	
Hancock	Bluffton	142.48	229.30	77	142	SR 103 – Arlington, Bluffton	
Hancock		145.36	233.93	78	145	SR 235 – Ada, Mount Cory	
Hancock	Findlay	156.81	252.36	79	156	US 68 south / SR 15 east / I-75 BL north to US 23 – Carey, Columbus, Kenton	South end of SR 15 overlap
Hancock	Findlay	157.90	254.12	80	157	SR 12 – Findlay, Columbus Grove	
Hancock	Findlay	159.10	256.05	81	159	US 224 / SR 15 west – Findlay, Ottawa, Tiffin	North end of SR 15 overlap
Hancock		161.20	259.43	82	161	County Road 99	
Hancock		162.73	261.89	83		Mortimer	Added c. 1968; removed 1974
Hancock		164.65	264.98	84	164	SR 613 – McComb, Fostoria	
Wood		167.15	269.00	85	167	SR 18 – North Baltimore, Fostoria	
Wood		167.81	270.06	86	168	Eagleville Road, Quarry Road	Eastbound access via Grant Road; westbound access via Insley Road
Wood		171.86	276.58	87	171	I-75	End of I-75 concurrency
Wood	Liberty–Portage township line	175.63	282.65			SR 281 – Defiance, Wayne	
Wood	Bowling Green	180.13	289.89			US 6 – Fremont, Napoleon	Exit 65 off of US 6
Wood	Bowling Green	181.98	292.87			SR 64 (Wooster Street)	
Wood	Middleton Township	187.75	302.15			SR 582 (Middleton Pike) – Haskins, Luckey	
Wood	Perrysburg	192.83	310.33			I-475 / US 23 to I-75 – Toledo, Dayton, Ann Arbor	Exit 2 off of I-475/US 23; Diverging diamond interchange
Wood	Perrysburg	194.38	312.82			SR 65 south (Indiana Avenue)	Southern end of SR 65 concurrency
Wood	Perrysburg	194.64	313.24			US 20 east (Front Street) / SR 65 north	Northern end of SR 65 concurrency; southern end of US 20 concurrency
Wood	Perrysburg					SR 230	Intersection and route removed for Fort Meigs reconstruction
Lucas	Maumee	195.70	314.95			US 20 west / US 24 west (Anthony Wayne Trail / Conant Street)	Northern end of US 20 concurrency; southwestern end of US 24 concurrency
Lucas	Maumee	198.07	318.76			US 24 east (Anthony Wayne Trail)	Northeastern end of US 24 concurrency
Lucas	Toledo	200.44	322.58			SR 2 (Airport Highway)	
Lucas	Toledo	202.12	325.28			SR 246 (Dorr Street)	
Lucas	Toledo	203.11	326.87			US 223 (Monroe Street)	
Lucas	Toledo	203.28	327.15			I-75 – Detroit, Dayton	Exit 203B on I-75
Lucas	Toledo	204.16	328.56			SR 120 (Central Avenue)	
Lucas	Toledo	204.83	329.64			US 24 (Cherry Street)	SE end of US 24 concurrency
Lucas	Toledo	206.50	332.33			US 24 (Telegraph Road)	NE end of US 24 concurrency
Lucas	Toledo	207.53	333.99			SR 184 (Alexis Road)	
Lucas	Toledo	208.18	335.03			US 25 north (Dixie Highway) – Detroit	Continuation into Michigan
1.000 mi = 1.609 km; 1.000 km = 0.621 mi: Closed/former; Concurrency terminus; Incomplete access

== Notes ==
U.S. Route 25
Previous state: Kentucky	Ohio	Next state: Michigan
