= Ohio State Route 24 =

State Route 24

Route information
- Maintained by ODOT

Location
- Country: United States
- State: Ohio

Highway system
- Ohio State Highway System; Interstate; US; State; Scenic
← US 24	→ SR 25

In Ohio, State Route 24 may refer to:

- U.S. Route 24 in Ohio, the only Ohio highway numbered 24 since 1927
- Ohio State Route 24 (1923-1927), now SR 124
