= Ohio State Route 25 (disambiguation) =

Ohio State Route 25 is an Ohio State Route that runs between Cygnet and Toledo.

Ohio State Route 25 may also refer to:

- Ohio State Route 25 (1923-1927), now Ohio State Route 125, an east–west state highway in the southwestern portion of Ohio

== See also ==
- U.S. Route 25 in Ohio
