= Ohio State Route 23 =

State Route 23

Route information
- Maintained by ODOT

Location
- Country: United States
- State: Ohio

Highway system
- Ohio State Highway System; Interstate; US; State; Scenic
| ← US 23 | → US 24 |

In Ohio, State Route 23 may refer to:

- U.S. Route 23 in Ohio, the only Ohio highway numbered 23 since 1927
- Ohio State Route 23 (1923-1927), now SR 2 (Port Clinton to Toledo), SR 120 (Toledo to near Sylvania), and US 20 (near Sylvania to Indiana)
