= Ohio State Route 75 =

State Route 75

Route information
- Maintained by ODOT

Location
- Country: United States
- State: Ohio

Highway system
- Ohio State Highway System; Interstate; US; State; Scenic
← I-75	→ I-76

In Ohio, State Route 75 may refer to:

- Interstate 75 in Ohio, the only Ohio highway numbered 75 since about 1962
- Ohio State Route 75 (1923), now SR 93 (Ironton to West Lafayette) and SR 751 (West Lafayette to Stone Creek)
