= Ohio State Route 184 =

State highway in Lucas County, Ohio, US

State Route 184
- Alexis Road

Route information
- Maintained by ODOT
- Length: 10.14 mi (16.32 km)
- Existed: 1969–present

Major junctions
- West end: US 23 / US 223 / SR 51 in Sylvania
- US 24 in Toledo
- East end: I-75 in Toledo

Location
- Country: United States
- State: Ohio
- Counties: Lucas

Highway system
- Ohio State Highway System; Interstate; US; State; Scenic
← SR 183	→ SR 185

State Route 184 (SR 184) is a 10.14-mile (16.32 km) long east–west state highway in northwestern Ohio, a U.S. state. The western terminus of SR 184 is at the U.S. Route 23 (US 23) freeway in Sylvania, at a five-ramp parclo AB-3 interchange that also serves as the southern terminus of US 223, as well as the northern terminus of SR 51. The eastern terminus of SR 184 is at a diamond interchange with Interstate 75 in Toledo.

Created in the late 1960s, SR 184, which travels through Sylvania and Toledo, is known as Alexis Road from end-to-end. For its entire length, it runs approximately 0.75 miles (1.21 km) to the south of, and parallel to, the Michigan State Line.

== Route description ==
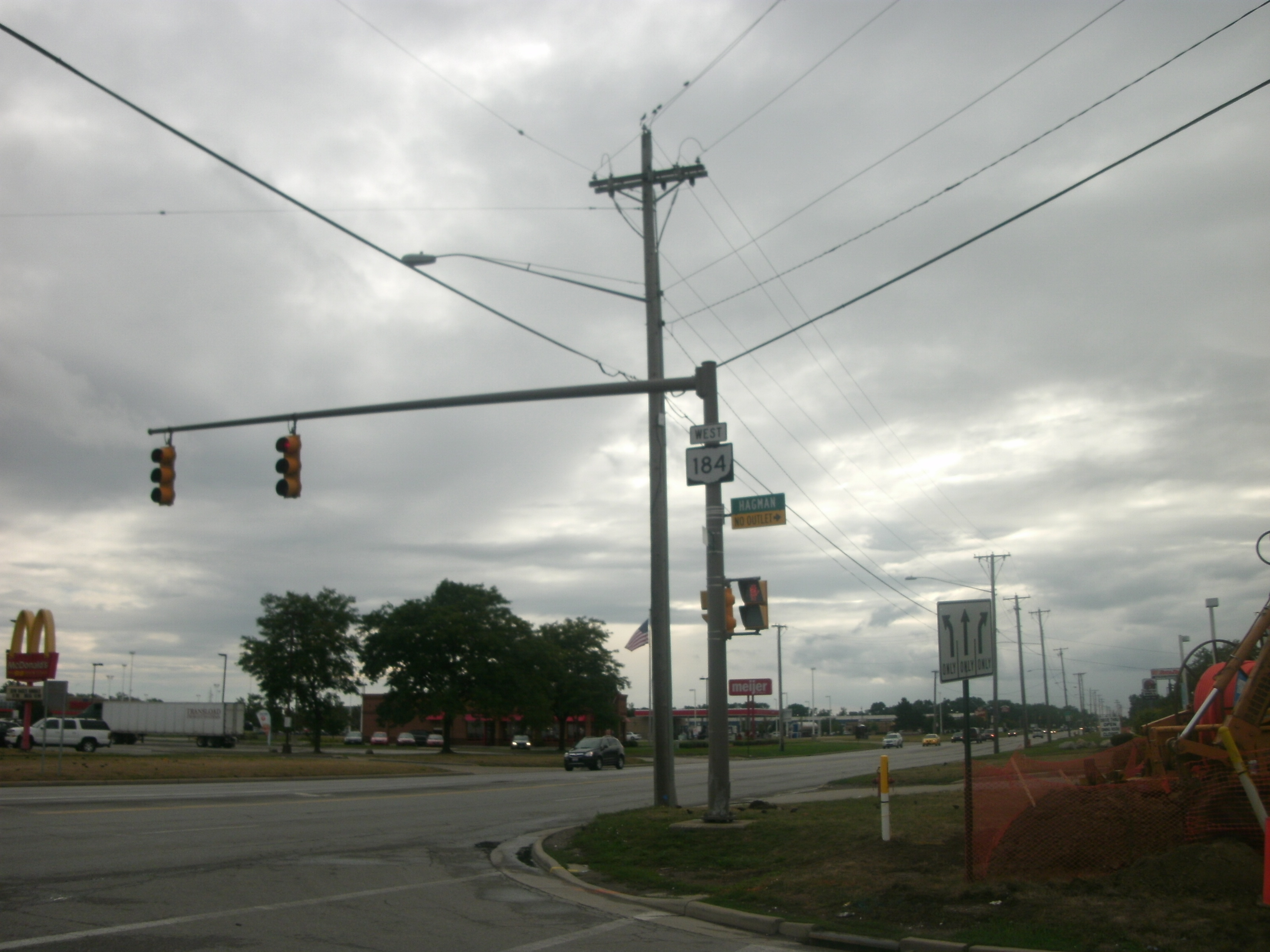
OH 184 westbound through the city of Toledo, just west of I-75

For its entire length, SR 184 runs within the northern portion of Lucas County. No part of SR 184 is included within the National Highway System.

== History ==
SR 184 was applied in 1969. It was designated along what was formerly, dually, a bypass route of US 24 and US 25, running from its present western terminus at the US 23 freeway in Sylvania to its intersection with Detroit Avenue, then a part of US 25, in Toledo.

Six years after it was established, SR 184 was extended east from the Detroit Avenue intersection to its current terminus at the northernmost interchange along I-75 in Ohio. At the time, this was a newly constructed interchange along the Interstate.

== Major intersections ==
The entire route is in Lucas County.

Location	mi	km	Destinations	Notes
Sylvania	0.00	0.00	US 23 / US 223 north / SR 51 south (Monroe Street) – Toledo, Ann Arbor	Exit 234 (US-23); Interchange, southern terminus of US 223, northern terminus of OH 51
Toledo	7.48	12.04	US 24 (Telegraph Road)	
Toledo	10.14	16.32	I-75 / LECT – Dayton, Detroit	Exit 210 (I-75)
1.000 mi = 1.609 km; 1.000 km = 0.621 mi
