= Interstate 75 in Ohio =

Interstate Highway in Ohio, United States

Interstate 75
- I-75 highlighted in red

Route information
- Maintained by ODOT
- Length: 211.55 mi (340.46 km)
- Existed: 1957–present
- NHS: Entire route

Major junctions
- South end: I-71 / I-75 at the Kentucky state line in Cincinnati
- I-71 in Cincinnati; I-74 / US 27 / US 52 in Cincinnati; I-275 in Sharonville; I-675 in Miami Township; I-70 in Butler Township; I-475 / US 23 in Perrysburg; I-80 Toll / I-90 Toll / Ohio Turnpike in Rossford; I-475 in Toledo; I-280 in Toledo
- North end: I-75 at the Michigan state line in Toledo

Location
- Country: United States
- State: Ohio
- Counties: Hamilton, Butler, Warren, Montgomery, Miami, Shelby, Auglaize, Allen, Hancock, Wood, Lucas

Highway system
- Interstate Highway System; Main; Auxiliary; Suffixed; Business; Future; Ohio State Highway System; Interstate; US; State; Scenic
← SR 74	→ SR 75

Interstate 75 (I-75) runs from Cincinnati to Toledo by way of Dayton in the US state of Ohio. The highway enters the state running concurrently with I-71 from Kentucky on the Brent Spence Bridge over the Ohio River and into the Bluegrass region. I-75 continues along the Mill Creek Expressway northward to the Butler County line just north of I-275. From there, the freeway runs into the Miami Valley and then passes through the Great Black Swamp before crossing into Michigan.

== Route description ==
The highway enters the state via the Brent Spence Bridge into Downtown Cincinnati. I-71 immediately splits off to the east from this point, taking a more easterly route through downtown, while I-75 continues north along the west side of downtown. The Mill Creek Expressway is a heavily trafficked portion of I-75 in Ohio, from the Ohio River at the Kentucky state line to Butler County in Cincinnati's northern suburbs that follows the path of its namesake, Mill Creek, and the former path of the Miami and Erie Canal, and passes through the city's industrial core.

The highway continues north, intersecting I-74 and turning to the northeast. At one point, while passing through the suburb of Arlington Heights, the carriageways split apart and create a wide enough space for the community to be completely enclosed by the Interstate; they rejoin at the other end of the community. The highway then intersects the Cincinnati beltway, I-275, and continues northeasterly through the West Chester Township, Monroe, Middletown, and Franklin en route to the Dayton metropolitan area.

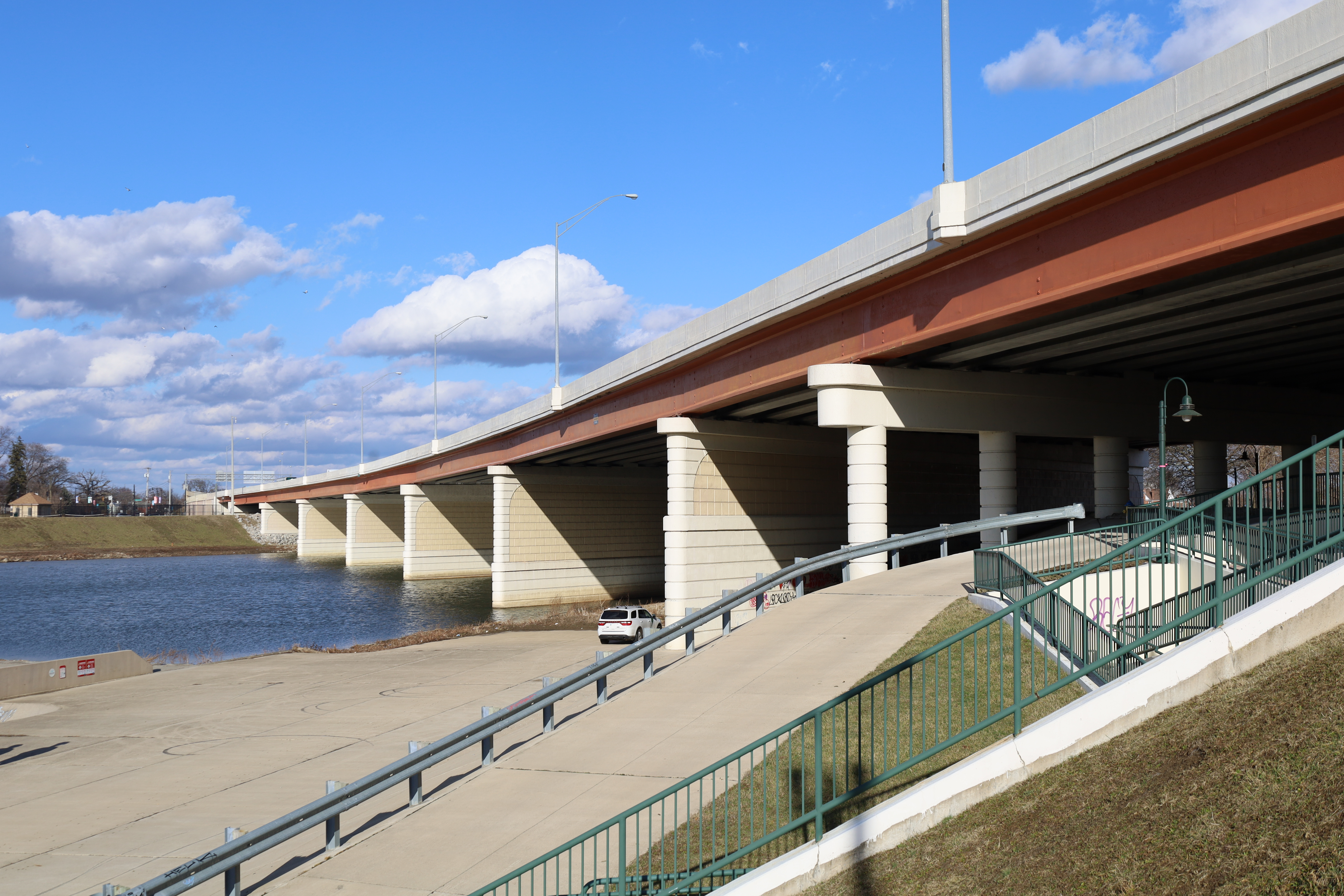
Third crossing, of seven, for I-75 over the Great Miami River

Once arriving in the Dayton area, I-75 first junctions with I-675, an eastern bypass of Dayton, in Miamisburg. The highway then continues north into Downtown Dayton, skirting it to the west and junctioning with I-70 near the Dayton International Airport.

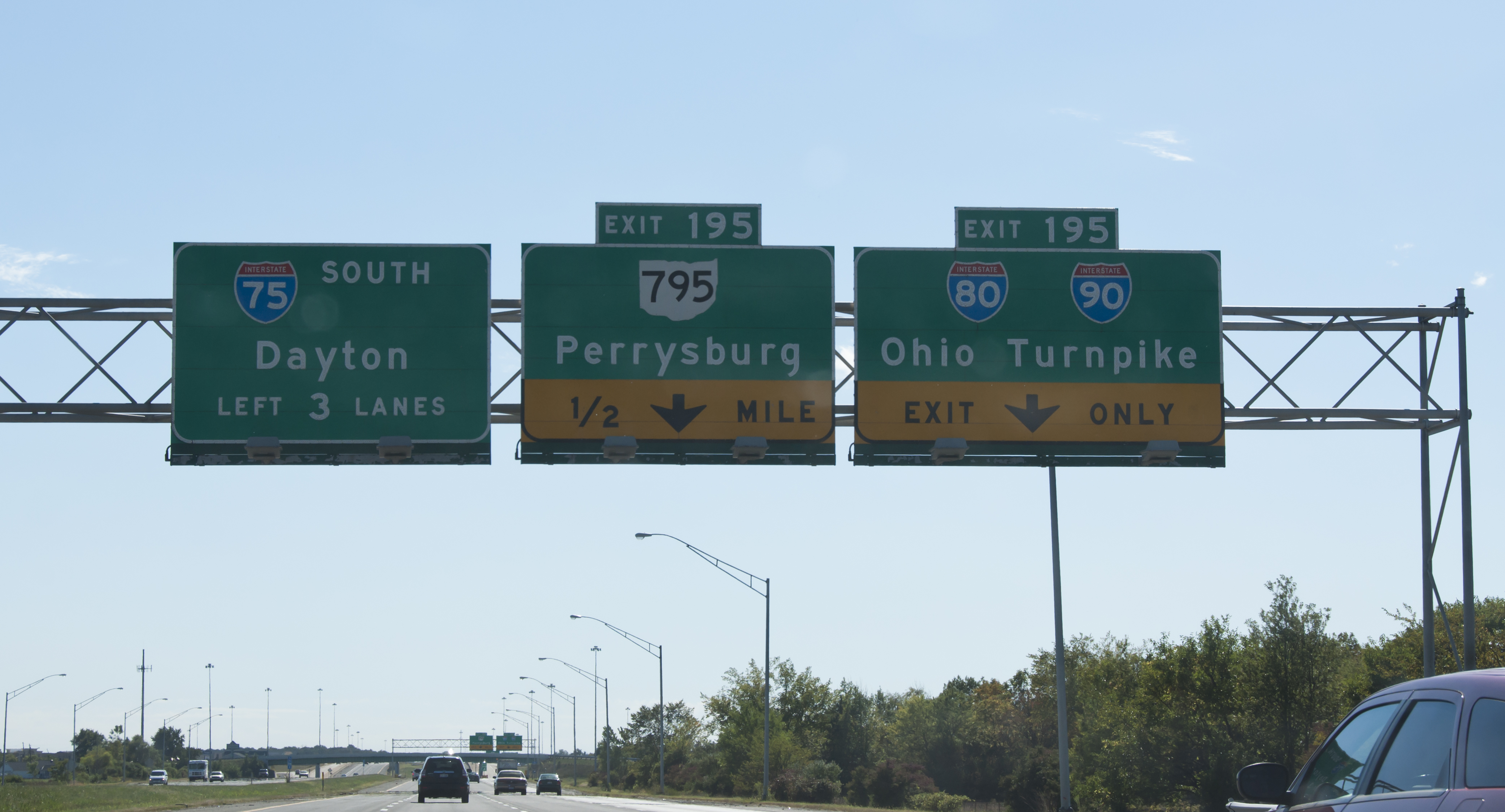
I-75 at the interchange with the Ohio Turnpike in Rossford

The highway then continues north through the western side of the state toward Toledo, passing through the small cities of Troy, Piqua, Lima, Findlay, and Bowling Green. Once the highway arrives in the Toledo metro area, it first intersects with I-475 in the suburb of Perrysburg, followed by an interchange with the Ohio Turnpike (I-80/I-90) in Rossford, and passing through Northwood. Before skirting Downtown Toledo to the west, I-75 enters the Toledo city limits and then crosses the Maumee River and continues north into Downtown Toledo. Just north of downtown, in the Old West End I-475 rejoins I-75. After continuing northeasterly, I-75 intersects I-280, in the North End of the city, which connects the Ohio Turnpike. Following this, I-75 passes through the Point Place/Shoreland lake shore community district. I-75 then enters Michigan and runs parallel with the shore of Lake Erie.

== History ==
I-75 in Ohio was built through the 1960s, supplanting U.S. Route 25 (US 25), though much of the freeway was built for US 25. By the time I-75 was finished, US 25 ran concurrently with I-75 for all but the northernmost section. By 1974, the US 25 designation was deemed unnecessary and removed from Ohio and Michigan. The northernmost section of US 25 in Ohio became State Route 25 (SR 25).

In 2005, the Ohio Department of Transportation (ODOT) considered reconfiguring I-75's existing interchange in Findlay with US 224 and SR 15 west as a diverging diamond interchange (DDI) to improve traffic flow. Had it been constructed, it would have been the first such interchange in the US. By 2006, ODOT had reconsidered, instead adding lanes to the existing overpass.

Traffic congestion in the Cincinnati–Dayton corridor has led to proposals for a regional I-75 bypass to divert through traffic.

The segment from West Chester to Middletown was widened in 2010. Construction on the highway continues from Middletown all the way to I-675.

In Dayton, ODOT recently completed total reconfiguration of I-75 with several projects occurring simultaneously. The intersection of I-75 and I-70 was reconfigured to handle an increased traffic load at the intersection. I-75 through Downtown Dayton at the intersections of SR 4, US 35, and between were widened and modernized.

ODOT between 2014 and 2016 completed a widening project between I-475 in Perrysburg and SR 15 in Findlay to add a third lane in each direction. The SR 15 interchange (which also features the north end of US 68) was subsequently rebuilt as well. Several miles north of the southerly I-475 junction, I-75 intersects with I-80/I-90 (Ohio Turnpike).

Work began in May 2019 to convert the existing interchange with Union Centre Boulevard in West Chester Township, Butler County, to a DDI. The $20-million project was completed in mid-2020.

In May 2024, work began to convert the existing interchange with County Road 99 in Findlay to a DDI. The project was completed in November 2025

=== Mill Creek Expressway ===
The Mill Creek Expressway generally follows the old Miami and Erie Canal, which extended from Cincinnati to Toledo via Dayton, itself built in the Mill Creek valley near Cincinnati. The canal extended from the Ohio River along the present locations of Eggleston Avenue and Central Parkway to Mount Storm Park and continued north, remaining close to the Mill Creek Expressway to Butler County.

The first portion of the expressway was built by the Works Progress Administration (WPA) in 1941 (Note: Only the eastern portion had been completed by December 1941. Construction on the western half was delayed first due to a dispute between local officials and the WPA and later due to the latter's closure.)—during World War II—to serve the Wright Aeronautical plant in Lockland. Known then as the Wright Highway, it was initially planned to run from Paddock Road (SR 4) in Carthage north to Cincinnati-Dayton Road (then US 25) near Maud but was only built—almost completely along the old canal—between Galbraith Road and Glendale-Milford Road (then SR 126). A short extension was built south to Towne Street in Elmwood Place in the late 1940s.

In 1960, plans were announced to add an eastern portion that would result in Arlington Heights being surrounded on both sides by the highway.

On January 19, 2015, an overpass north of Hopple Street collapsed onto the highway below at approximately 10:30 pm. The span that failed was the segment of the former northbound ramp to Hopple Street that passed over the southbound lanes of I-75. The overpass had been closed and was in the process of being removed after a replacement ramp was opened on December 26, 2014. The Interstate underneath was open at the time of the failure. One construction worker on the overpass was killed during the collapse by a falling steel beam. A truck driver was injured when their semi hit the fallen overpass immediately after the collapse. One other worker was in a backhoe on the bridge but was uninjured.

== Future ==
There are plans to convert the existing interchange with SR 725 in Miamisburg to a DDI. The project was to be built in 2023 and its projected cost was $4.1 million, entirely funded by the state. However, in August 2023, ODOT announced that it planned to study the project for a few more years, owing to a traffic signal retiming project completed in March 2022. ODOT suggested that the DDI might actually create more delays along the SR 725 corridor.

In Cincinnati, approximately 17 miles (27 km) of the highway will be totally reconfigured by three separate ODOT projects happening simultaneously. The Brent Spence Bridge Corridor project will replace the Brent Spence Bridge and continue north to the Western Hills Viaduct. The Mill Creek Expressway project will modernize the Mill Creek Expressway segment of the highway, from the Western Hills Viaduct to the Ronald Reagan Cross County Highway interchange. The Thru the Valley project will continue from the Cross County Highway north to I-275. These projects will improve safety by eliminating all left-hand exit ramps and increasing vehicular capacity.

As of May 2025, there are plans to convert the existing interchange with US 20 and US 23 in Perrysburg to a DDI.

== Exit list ==
County	Location	mi	km	Old exit	New exit	Destinations	Notes
Ohio River		0.00	0.00			I-75 south / I-71 south – Lexington, Louisville	Continuation into Kentucky
Ohio River		0.00	0.00	Brent Spence Bridge; Kentucky–Ohio state line			
Hamilton	Cincinnati	0.22	0.35	1	1B	I-71 north / US 50 east (Fort Washington Way) to I-471 south / US 52 east / Second Street – Columbus, Downtown Cincinnati, Riverfront	Northern end of I-71 overlap; was exit 1A before the Fort Washington Way reconstruction; southbound ramp to Second Street closed permanently on June 29, 2026
Hamilton	Cincinnati	0.50	0.80	2	1C	Fifth Street, Central Avenue (US 22 / US 27 / US 42 / US 52 / US 127 / SR 3) – Downtown Cincinnati	No southbound entrance; was exit 1E before the Fort Washington Way reconstruction
Hamilton	Cincinnati	0.63	1.01	3	1D	US 50 west (River Road, Sixth Street Expressway, SR 264 west) / Linn Street	Northbound exit and southbound entrance; was exit 1G before the Fort Washington Way reconstruction
Hamilton	Cincinnati	0.71	1.14	4	1E	Seventh Street	No northbound exit; was exit 1F before the Fort Washington Way reconstruction
Hamilton	Cincinnati	1.24	2.00	5	1F	To US 50 west / Freeman Avenue	Southbound exit and northbound entrance; was exit 1G before the Fort Washington Way reconstruction
Hamilton	Cincinnati	1.44	2.32	6	1G	Ezzard Charles Drive	No northbound exit, but ramp can be accessed by traffic entering at exits 1B, 1C, and 1E; was exit 1H before the Fort Washington Way reconstruction; formerly signed as Lincoln Park Drive
Hamilton	Cincinnati	1.72	2.77	7	2A	Western Avenue, Liberty Street	Southbound exit and northbound entrance
Hamilton	Cincinnati	2.51	4.04	8	2B	Harrison Avenue (Western Hills Viaduct)	Signed as exit 2 northbound
Hamilton	Cincinnati	3.50	5.63	9	3	US 27 south / US 52 east / US 127 / Hopple Street	Southern end of US 27/US 52 overlap
Hamilton	Cincinnati	4.23	6.81	10	4	I-74 west / US 27 north / US 52 west – Indianapolis	I-74 exit 20; northern end of US 27/US 52 overlap; exit connected to Colerain Avenue prior to construction of I-74
Hamilton	Cincinnati	6.46	10.40	11	6	Mitchell Avenue – St. Bernard	
Hamilton	Cincinnati	7.81	12.57	13	7	SR 562 east to I-71 – Norwood	
Hamilton	Cincinnati	8.57	13.79	14	8	Towne Street – Elmwood Place	Northbound exit and entrance; to be removed
Hamilton	Cincinnati	9.45	15.21	15	9	SR 4 (Paddock Road) to SR 561 (Seymour Avenue)	
Hamilton	Cincinnati	10.31	16.59	16	10A	SR 126 (Ronald Reagan Cross County Highway)	Southbound exit to SR 126 and northbound entrance from westbound SR 126 via exit 10
Hamilton	Arlington Heights	10.89	17.53	17	10B	Galbraith Road	Signed as exit 10 southbound
Hamilton	Lockland	11.84	19.05	18	12	Lockland, Reading	No northbound entrance; southbound right-in/right-out to Cooper Avenue and northbound exit to Davis Street
Hamilton	Evendale	12.92	20.79	19	13	Shepherd Lane, Neumann Way – Lincoln Heights	Southbound exit to Neumann Way via Exit 14; Neumann Way serves GE Aviation
Hamilton	Evendale	14.26	22.95	20	14	Glendale-Milford Road – Evendale, Woodlawn	
Hamilton	Sharonville	15.39	24.77	21	15	Sharon Road – Glendale	
Hamilton	Sharonville	16.79	27.02	22	16	I-275 to I-71 / I-74 – Columbus, Indianapolis	Signed as exits 16A (east) and 16B (west) southbound; I-275 exit 43
Butler	West Chester Township	19.24	30.96		19	Union Centre Boulevard – Fairfield	diverging diamond interchange (DDI)
Butler	West Chester Township	21.23	34.17	23	21	Cincinnati–Dayton Road	Former US 25
Butler	West Chester Township	22.82	36.73	24	22	Tylersville Road – Mason	
Butler	Liberty Township	24.19	38.93		24	SR 129 west / Liberty Way – Hamilton	SR 129 exit 25
Butler	Liberty Township				26	Millikin Road	Future interchange
Warren	Monroe	29.10– 29.11	46.83– 46.85	25	29	SR 63 – Monroe, Lebanon, Hamilton	
Warren	Middletown	32.82	52.82	26	32	SR 122 – Middletown	
Warren	Franklin	36.89	59.37	27	36	SR 123 – Franklin, Lebanon	
Warren	Franklin–Springboro line	38.74	62.35	28	38	SR 73 – Springboro, Franklin	
Montgomery	Miamisburg–Springboro line	41.56	66.88		41	Austin Boulevard – Springboro, Miamisburg, Washington Township	Opened in July 2010
Montgomery	Miami Township	43.51– 43.52	70.02– 70.04	29	43	I-675 north – Columbus	Directional T interchange.
Montgomery	Miamisburg	44.66	71.87	30	44	SR 725 – Centerville, Miamisburg	
Montgomery	West Carrollton	47.31	76.14	31	47	East Dixie Drive – West Carrollton, Moraine	Former US 25; Converted to full access interchange in 2012
Montgomery	Moraine	50.23	80.84	32	50A	Dryden Road	
Montgomery	Moraine	50.49	81.26		50B	SR 741 south (Springboro Pike)	Southbound exit and northbound entrance
Montgomery	Dayton	51.36	82.66	Bridge over the Great Miami River			
Montgomery	Dayton	51.70	83.20	33	51	Edwin C. Moses Boulevard, Nicholas Road	
Montgomery	Dayton	52.14– 52.56	83.91– 84.59	34	52A	Albany Street, Stewart Street	Former southbound exit and northbound entrance; closed in spring 2010 as part of I-75 Downtown Modernization
Montgomery	Dayton	52.69	84.80	35	52	US 35 / SR 4 – Xenia, Eaton	Southern end of SR 4 concurrency; ramps to westbound US 35 and from eastbound US 35 include entrances and exits for Germantown Street; was exit 52B before Albany Street/Stewart Street exit was removed
Montgomery	Dayton	53.18	85.58	Bridge over the Great Miami River			
Montgomery	Dayton	53.41	85.96	36	53	Second Street, Salem Avenue, First Street	Formerly signed as 53A (Third Street) and 53B (Salem Avenue, First Street) before interchange rebuild in 2016; exit 53 was also formerly exit 37; no southbound access to First Street
Montgomery	Dayton	53.8	86.6	Bridge over the Great Miami River			
Montgomery	Dayton	54.22	87.26	38	54A	Grand Avenue, Riverside Drive, Main Street	Closed; southbound originally had two ramps to Riverside Drive which were later removed; access consolidated with newly built Main Street exit as part of I-75 Downtown Modernization
Montgomery	Dayton	54.38	87.52	39	54A	SR 48 (Main Street)	Was exit 54B before Grand Avenue/Riverside Drive/Main Street exit was removed
Montgomery	Dayton	54.63	87.92	Bridge over the Great Miami River			
Montgomery	Dayton	54.84– 54.87	88.26– 88.30	40	54B	SR 4 / Webster Street, Keowee Street – Springfield	Northern terminus of SR 4 concurrency; was exit 54C before Grand Avenue/Riverside Drive/Main Street exit was removed
Montgomery	Dayton	55.28– 55.58	88.96– 89.45	41	55	Keowee Street, Leo Street	Closed; was signed northbound as exits 55A (Keowee Street south) and 55B (Keowee Street north, Leo Street); access to Keowee consolidated with Webster Street as part of I-75 Downtown Modernization
Montgomery	Dayton	55.95	90.04	42	56	Stanley Avenue	
Montgomery	Dayton	56.15	90.36	Bridge over the Great Miami River			
Montgomery	Northridge	56.46	90.86	43	57A	Neva Drive	Former northbound exit and southbound entrance; closed with I-75 Downtown Modernization
Montgomery	Northridge	56.74	91.31	44	57	Wagner Ford Road, Siebenthaler Avenue, Neff Road	Southbound exit only to Neff Road; indirect southbound exit to Wagner Ford Road via Keats Drive; indirect access to Siebenthaler Avenue in both directions via Wagner Ford Road and Dixie Drive; was exit 57B before Neva Drive exit was removed
Montgomery	Northridge–Harrison Township line	58.21	93.68	45	58	Needmore Road	
Montgomery	Vandalia–Butler Township line	59.72	96.11		59	Wyse Road, Benchwood Road	Benchwood Road becomes Wyse Road immediately east of exit
Montgomery	Vandalia–Butler Township line	60.71	97.70	46	60	Little York Road	Closed; northbound access was via Poe Avenue and southbound access via Miller Lane; replaced by exit 59
Montgomery	Butler Township	61.36– 61.38	98.75– 98.78	47	61	I-70 – Indianapolis, Columbus	Signed as exits 61A (east) and 61B (west) southbound; I-70 exit 33
Montgomery	Vandalia	63.18	101.68	48	63	US 40 – Donnelsville, Vandalia	
Montgomery	Vandalia	63.84	102.74	49	64	Northwoods Boulevard	
Miami	Tipp City	67.96	109.37	50	68	SR 571 – Tipp City, West Milton	
Miami	Tipp City	69.74	112.24	51	69	County Road 25A	Former US 25
Miami	Troy	73.19– 73.20	117.79– 117.80	52	73	SR 55 – Ludlow Falls, Troy	
Miami	Troy	75.05	120.78	53	74	SR 41 – Troy, Covington	
Miami	Washington Township	78.50	126.33	54	78	County Road 25A	Former US 25
Miami	Washington–Staunton township line	78.62	126.53	Bridge over the Great Miami River			
Miami	Piqua	82.06– 82.08	132.06– 132.09	55	82	US 36 – Urbana, Piqua	
Miami	Piqua	82.93– 83.11	133.46– 133.75	56	83	County Road 25A – Piqua	Former US 25
Shelby	Sidney	90.58	145.77	57	90	Fair Road – Sidney	
Shelby		91.96	148.00	58	92	SR 47 – Sidney, Versailles	
Shelby		93.83	151.00	59	93	SR 29 – Sidney, St. Marys	
Shelby		94.73	152.45	60	94	County Road 25A Sidney	Former US 25
Shelby		99.77	160.56	61	99	SR 119 – Anna, Minster	
Shelby		102.84	165.50	62	102	SR 274 – Jackson Center, New Bremen	
Shelby		104.84	168.72	63	104	SR 219 – Botkins	
Auglaize		110.82	178.35	64	110	US 33 – St. Marys, Bellefontaine	
Auglaize	Wapakoneta	111.26	179.06	65	111	Bellefontaine Street – Wapakoneta	
Auglaize		113.02	181.89	66	113	SR 67 – Uniopolis, Wapakoneta	
Auglaize	Cridersville	118.16	190.16	67	118	National Road – Cridersville	
Allen	Fort Shawnee	120.52	193.96	68	120	Breese Road – Fort Shawnee	
Allen	Lima	122.63	197.35	69	122	SR 65 – Ottawa, Uniopolis, Lima	
Allen	Lima	124.51	200.38	70	124	Fourth Street	
Allen	Lima	125.43	201.86	71	125	SR 117 / SR 309 – Lima, Kenton	
Allen		127.15	204.63	72	127	SR 81 – Ada, Lima	
Allen		130.23	209.58	73	130	Bluelick Road	
Allen		134.72	216.81	74	134	Napoleon Road	Northbound exit and southbound entrance
Allen	Beaverdam	135.69	218.37	75	135	SR 696 to US 30 – Delphos, Upper Sandusky	Lincoln Highway
Allen	Bluffton	140.52	226.15	76	140	Bentley Road (SR 103) – Bluffton	
Hancock	Bluffton	142.48	229.30	77	142	SR 103 – Arlington, Bluffton	
Hancock		145.36	233.93	78	145	SR 235 – Ada, Mount Cory	
Hancock	Findlay	156.81	252.36	79	156	US 68 south / SR 15 east to US 23 – Carey, Columbus, Kenton	Southern end of SR 15 overlap; northern terminus of US 68
Hancock	Findlay	157.90	254.12	80	157	SR 12 – Findlay, Columbus Grove	
Hancock	Findlay	159.10	256.05	81	159	US 224 / SR 15 west – Findlay, Ottawa, Tiffin	Northern end of SR 15 overlap
Hancock		161.20	259.43	82	161	County Road 99	
Hancock		162.73	261.89	83		Mortimer	Added c. 1968; removed 1974; exit connected to CR 109
Hancock		164.65	264.98	84	164	SR 613 – McComb, Fostoria	
Wood		167.15	269.00	85	167	SR 18 – North Baltimore, Fostoria	
Wood		167.81	270.06	86	168	Eagleville Road, Quarry Road	Eastbound access via Grant Road; westbound access via Insley Road
Wood		171.86	276.58	87	171	SR 25 – Cygnet	Southern terminus of SR 25
Wood		179.75	289.28	88	179	US 6 – Fremont, Napoleon	US 6 exit 66
Wood	Bowling Green	181.41	291.95	89	181	SR 64 / SR 105 – Pemberville, Bowling Green	To Bowling Green State University
Wood	Dunbridge	187.24	301.33	90	187	SR 582 – Luckey, Haskins	
Wood		191.99– 192.60	308.98– 309.96	91	192	I-475 north / US 23 north – Maumee, Ann Arbor	Southern end of US 23 overlap; I-475 exit 1
Wood	Perrysburg	193.85	311.97	92	193	US 20 / US 23 south – Fremont, Perrysburg	Northern end of US 23 overlap
Wood	Rossford	195.23– 195.69	314.19– 314.93	—	195	I-80 Toll / I-90 Toll / Ohio Turnpike / SR 795 – Perrysburg, Cleveland, Chicago	Connection to the Turnpike opened December 4, 1991; ramps to SR 795 opened August 22, 1994; signed as 195A (SR 795) and 195B (Ohio Turnpike), exits connected via collector/distributor lanes
Wood	Rossford	197.19	317.35	93	197	Buck Road	
Wood	Northwood	199.02	320.29	94	198	Wales Road, Oregon Road – Northwood	
Lucas	Toledo	199.84	321.61	95	199	SR 65 (Miami Street) – Rossford	
Lucas	Toledo	199.96	321.80	Michael V. DiSalle Bridge over the Maumee River (Replaced in 2023)			
Lucas	Toledo	200.60	322.83	96	200	Kuhlman Drive, South Avenue	Access To Toledo Zoo (Broadway Street); Kuhlman Drive signed northbound only
Lucas	Toledo	201.36– 201.68	324.06– 324.57	97	201A	To SR 25 south / Collingwood Avenue – Maumee	Northbound exit and southbound entrance from eastbound Collingwood Avenue; provides access from northbound I-75 to southbound SR 25 and from northbound SR 25 to southbound I-75
Lucas	Toledo	201.68	324.57	98	201B	SR 25 – Downtown Toledo, Maumee	Directional access (northbound to northbound and southbound to southbound) only; Downtown Toledo signed northbound only, Maumee signed southbound only
Lucas	Toledo	202.03	325.14	99	202A	Washington Street – Downtown Toledo	Southbound exit via Indiana Avenue and northbound entrance
Lucas	Toledo	202.49	325.88	100	202B	Collingwood Boulevard	Southbound exit and northbound entrance
Lucas	Toledo	203.33	327.23	100	203A	Bancroft Street	Northbound exit and southbound entrance via Lawrence Avenue
Lucas	Toledo	203.68	327.79	101	203B	US 24 (Detroit Avenue) to SR 51 (Monroe Street)	Exit located at Detroit Avenue
Lucas	Toledo	204.21– 204.52	328.64– 329.14	—	204	I-475 west to US 23 – Sylvania, Maumee, Ann Arbor	I-475 exit 20
Lucas	Toledo	204.73– 204.89	329.48– 329.74	102	205	Jeep Parkway	Interchange closed from March 2015 to July 2018 for reconstruction
Lucas	Toledo	205.46	330.66	103	205B	Berdan Avenue	Former northbound exit and southbound entrance; closed October 2016
Lucas	Toledo	205.55	330.80	Viaduct over the Ottawa River			
Lucas	Toledo	206.00	331.52	104	206	To US 24 / Phillips Avenue	
Lucas	Toledo	206.93	333.02	105	207	Stickney Avenue, Lagrange Street	
Lucas	Toledo	207.76– 207.86	334.36– 334.52	106	208	I-280 south / LECT to I-80 east / I-90 east / Ohio Turnpike east – Cleveland	
Lucas	Toledo	209.52	337.19	107	209	Ottawa River Road	Northbound exit and southbound entrance
Lucas	Toledo	209.84	337.70	Bridge over the Ottawa River			
Lucas	Toledo	210.52	338.80	108	210	SR 184 (Alexis Road)	
Lucas	Toledo	211.55	340.46			I-75 north / LECT north – Detroit	Continuation into Michigan
1.000 mi = 1.609 km; 1.000 km = 0.621 mi: Closed/former; Concurrency terminus; Incomplete access; Unopened

== Auxiliary routes ==
I-75 in Ohio has three auxiliary routes. The southernmost is I-275, which serves as a full loop around Cincinnati, including segments that extend into Indiana and Kentucky. The northernmost is I-475, a bypass around Toledo area that also carries US 23 for 14 miles (23 km). The third auxiliary route is I-675 bypassing Dayton to the south and east and connecting to I-70 northeast of the city.

In addition to these auxiliary routes, there are three business routes of I-75. These run along former segments of US 25, I-75's predecessor highway. They connect to the downtowns of Troy and Piqua; Sidney; and Findlay.

== See also ==
- Battle of I-75

== Notes ==
Interstate 75
Previous state: Kentucky	Ohio	Next state: Michigan
