= Ohio State Route 64 =

State highway in northwestern Ohio, US

State Route 64

Route information
- Maintained by ODOT
- Length: 36.47 mi (58.69 km)
- Existed: 1923–present

Major junctions
- South end: I-75 / SR 105 in Bowling Green
- US 24 in Whitehouse; US 20 near Metamora
- North end: Michigan state line near Metamora

Location
- Country: United States
- State: Ohio
- Counties: Wood, Lucas, Fulton

Highway system
- Ohio State Highway System; Interstate; US; State; Scenic
← SR 63	→ SR 65

State Route 64 (SR 64) is a 36.44-mile (58.64 km) long north–south state highway in the northwestern portion of the U.S. state of Ohio. The southern terminus of SR 64 is at an interchange with Interstate 75 (I-75) in Bowling Green which also doubles as the western terminus of SR 105. Its northern terminus is at the Michigan state line just 0.25 miles (0.40 km) north of the village limits of Metamora. Continuing north into Michigan's Lenawee County is county-maintained Loar Highway.

== Route description ==
SR 64 traverses portions of Wood, Lucas and Fulton Counties. There is no portion of this route that is included within the National Highway System (NHS). The NHS is a network of highways identified as being most important for the economy, mobility and defense of the country.

== History ==
The SR 64 designation was established in 1923. At its inception, SR 64 followed the majority of its present routing, traveling from downtown Bowling Green to its present northern terminus at the Michigan state line just outside Metamora.

The only significant change to take place to the routing of SR 64 was an extension at the southern end that happened in 1969. Coinciding with the completions of both I-75 on the east side of Bowling Green, and the U.S. Route 6 (US 6) bypass of the city to the south, SR 64 was extended east from the present SR 25 (former US 25) intersection in downtown Bowling Green along the former routing of US 6 on Main Street to its present southern terminus at the junction of I-75 and SR 105.

== Major junctions ==
County	Location	mi	km	Destinations	Notes
Wood	Bowling Green	0.00	0.00	I-75 / SR 105 east (East Wooster Street) – Dayton, Toledo, Pemberville	Exit 181 (I-75); western terminus of SR 105
Wood	Bowling Green	2.29	3.69	SR 25 (Main Street)	
Wood	Haskins	9.15	14.73	SR 582 (Middleton Pike) – Luckey	
Wood	Middleton Township	11.45	18.43	SR 65 south	Southern end of SR 65 concurrency
Wood	Middleton Township	12.01	19.33	SR 65 north (Perrysburg)	Northern end of SR 65 concurrency
Lucas	Waterville Township	14.48	23.30	US 24 – Toledo, Napoleon	Exit 63 (US 24)
Lucas	Waterville–Swanton township line	18.57	29.89	SR 295 (Berkey Southern Road) – Berkey, Grand Rapids	
Lucas	Swanton	24.62	39.62	US 20A east / SR 2 east (Airport Highway) – Maumee, Toledo	Southern end of US 20A / SR 2 concurrency
Fulton	Swanton	25.35	40.80	US 20A west / SR 2 west (Airport Highway) / South Main Street	Northern end of US 20A / SR 2 concurrency
Fulton	Amboy Township	32.46	52.24	US 20 east / SR 120 – Toledo, Fayette	Southern end of SR 120 concurrency
Fulton	Metamora	35.38	56.94	SR 120 west (Main Street)	Northern end of SR 120 concurrency
Fulton	Amboy Township	36.47	58.69	Loar Highway	Michigan state line
1.000 mi = 1.609 km; 1.000 km = 0.621 mi: Concurrency terminus
