= Ohio State Route 51 =

State highway in northwestern Ohio, US

State Route 51

Route information
- Maintained by ODOT
- Length: 30.76 mi (49.50 km)
- Existed: 1955–present

Major junctions
- South end: US 20 / CR 66 near Elmore
- I-80 Toll / I-90 Toll / Ohio Turnpike near Elmore; I-280 in Northwood; US 24 in Toledo; I-475 in Toledo
- North end: US 23 / US 223 / SR 184 in Sylvania

Location
- Country: United States
- State: Ohio
- Counties: Sandusky, Ottawa, Wood, Lucas

Highway system
- Ohio State Highway System; Interstate; US; State; Scenic
← US 50N	→ US 52

State Route 51 (SR 51) is a northwest-southeast highway (signed north-south) in northwest Ohio. Its southern terminus is at U.S. Route 20 just south of Elmore, Ohio, and its northern terminus is at its interchange, along with State Route 184, at U.S. Route 23 in Sylvania, Ohio. Before an ODOT signage project in 2010, the northern (western) portion of the route, from its northern (western) terminus to the Maumee River was signed as an east-west route. The portion from the Maumee to its southern (eastern) terminus was signed north-south. ODOT has now signed all portions as north-south.

== Route description ==
From its southern terminus, State Route 51 heads north to an interchange with the Ohio Turnpike before it enters Elmore. After exiting Elmore, the route heads northwest through the village of Genoa and near the town of Millbury before entering Northwood. The route from here to the Maumee River is also known as Woodville Road.

The route interchanges with Interstate 280 before entering southwest Oregon and into Toledo. After it crosses the Maumee, it eventually moves onto Monroe Street, which moves in a generally northwesterly direction until it reaches U.S. Route 23 in Sylvania, where it ends. SR 184 and US 223 end here as well.

== History ==
The original route of State Route 51 was that of current State Route 49 in western Ohio. The route was generally changed from 51 to 49 until the entire route became 49 in 1935.

A new State Route 51 was certified in 1955, with its southern terminus where it is now and its northern terminus at then-State Route 120 (close to where I-280 is now) in Northwood. State Route 51 was extended to State Route 2 in Oregon in 1959.

In 1989, State Route 51 replaced the route of U.S. Route 223 though Toledo and Sylvania across the Maumee River and on Monroe Street. U.S. Route 223 now officially ends at U.S. Route 23's interchange with State Routes 51 and 184 in Sylvania.

State Route 51's interchange with the Ohio Turnpike was opened in 1997.

== Major junctions ==
County	Location	mi	km	Destinations	Notes
Sandusky	Woodville–Washington township line	0.00	0.00	US 20 / CR 66 (Township Line Road) – Fremont, Woodville	
Sandusky	Woodville–Washington township line	2.18	3.51	I-80 Toll / I-90 Toll / Ohio Turnpike – Toledo, Cleveland	Exit 81 (I-80/I-90/Ohio Tpk.)
Ottawa	Harris Township	3.86	6.21	SR 105	
Ottawa	Clay Township	7.19	11.57	SR 163 – Oak Harbor, Genoa	
Ottawa	Clay–Allen township line	11.70	18.83	SR 795 west / CR 66 (Moline Martin Road) – Millbury, Perrysburg	Eastern terminus of SR 795
Wood	Lake Township	15.90	25.59	SR 579 east (Williston Road)	Western terminus of SR 579
Wood	Northwood	16.90– 17.06	27.20– 27.46	I-280 / Wales Road / Curtice Road – Toledo, Columbus	Exit 6A (I-280)
Lucas	Toledo	19.76	31.80	SR 2 east (Navarre Avenue) / Berry Street	Southern end of SR 2 concurrency
Lucas	Toledo	20.21	32.52	SR 65 south (Oak Street)	Southern end of SR 65 concurrency
Lucas	Maumee River			Anthony Wayne Bridge	
Lucas	Toledo	21.05	33.88	SR 2 west (South Summit Street) / Clayton Street	Northern end of SR 2 concurrency
Lucas	Toledo	21.50	34.60	SR 65 north (North Summit Street) / Monroe Street	Northern end of SR 65 concurrency
Lucas	Toledo	21.74	34.99	SR 25 north (North Erie Street)	One-way pair
Lucas	Toledo	21.85	35.16	SR 25 south (North Michigan Street)	One-way pair
Lucas	Toledo	22.25	35.81	SR 246 west (17th Street)	Eastern terminus of SR 246
Lucas	Toledo	23.59	37.96	US 24 (North Detroit Avenue) to I-75	
Lucas	Toledo	25.34	40.78	SR 120 (West Central Avenue) / Northwood Avenue	
Lucas	Toledo	26.27	42.28	I-475 east	Exit 18A (I-475); southbound SR 51 to eastbound I-475 / westbound I-475 to northbound SR 51 only
Lucas	Sylvania	30.47– 30.75	49.04– 49.49	US 23 / US 223 / SR 184 north (Alexis Road) / Monroe Street east – Ann Arbor, MI, Toledo	Interchange; southern terminus of US 223, western terminus of SR 184
1.000 mi = 1.609 km; 1.000 km = 0.621 mi: Concurrency terminus; Incomplete access; Tolled
