= Okolona, Ohio =

Unincorporated community in Ohio, U.S.

Coordinates: 41°21′19″N 84°13′04″W

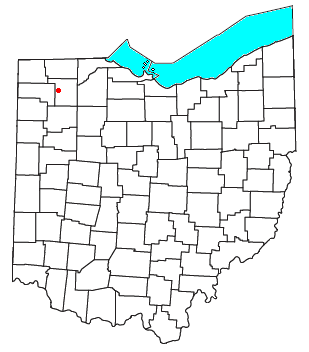
Location of Okolona, Ohio

Okolona is an unincorporated community in southwestern Napoleon Township, Henry County, Ohio, United States. It has a post office with the ZIP code 43550. It is located along County Road 17-D a short distance southeast of U.S. Route 24.

== History ==
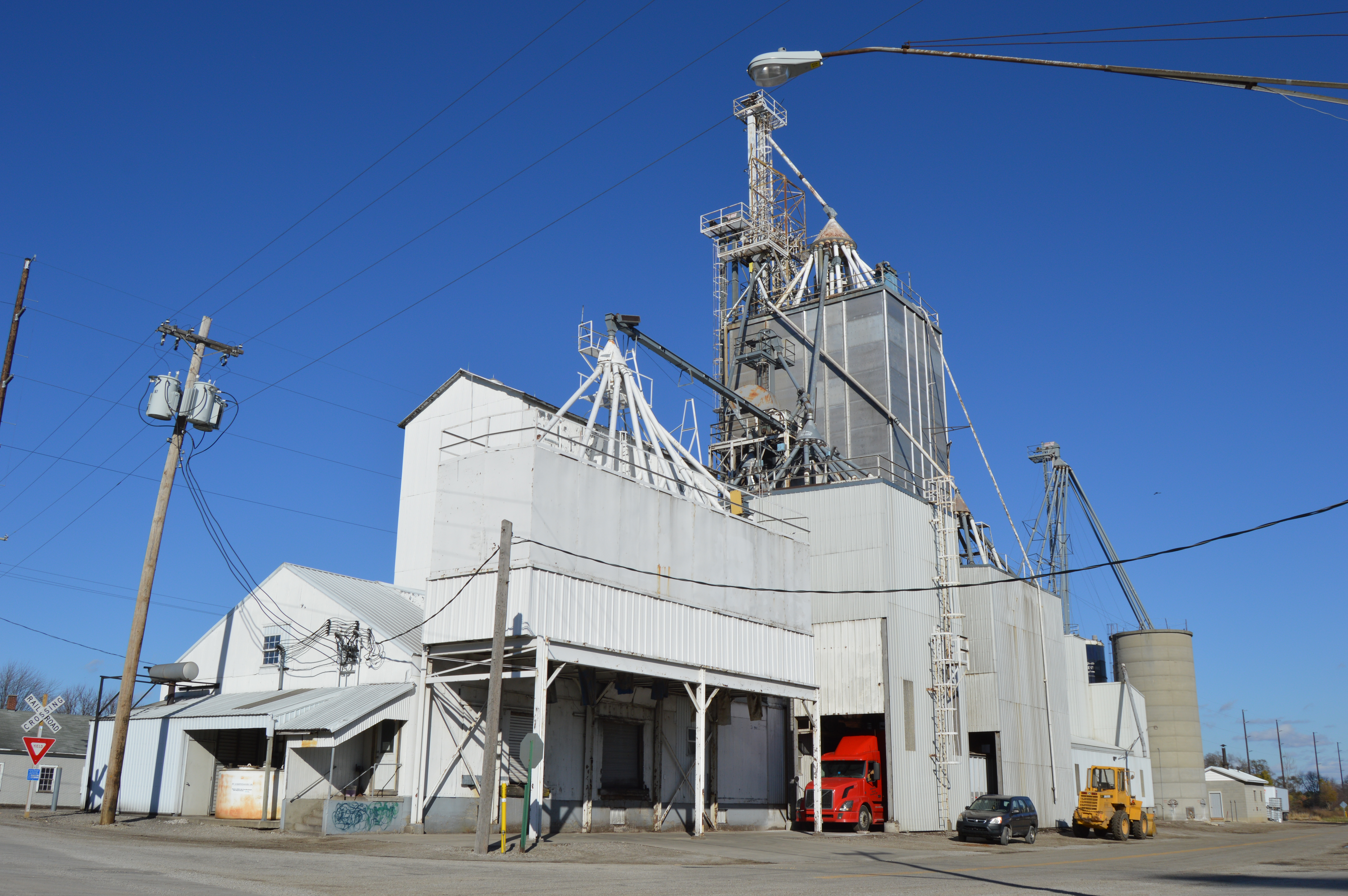
Republic Mills elevator

Okolona was originally called Oakland Station, and under the latter name had its start in the 1860s as a station on the Wabash Railroad. There being another Oakland in the state, the town's name was changed to the invented name, by Nathaniel Norden, of Okolona in order to avoid repetition. A post office called Okolona has been in operation since 1866 but has since been closed 2016.
