= U.S. Route 24 in Ohio =

Section of U.S. Highway in Ohio, United States

U.S. Route 24
- US 24 highlighted in red across Northwest Ohio

Route information
- Maintained by ODOT
- Length: 83.33 mi (134.11 km)

Major junctions
- West end: US 24 near Antwerp
- US 127 near Cecil; US 6 near Napoleon; I-475 / US 23 in Maumee; US 20 in Maumee; I-75 in Toledo
- East end: US 24 in Toledo

Location
- Country: United States
- State: Ohio
- Counties: Paulding, Defiance, Henry, Lucas

Highway system
- United States Numbered Highway System; List; Special; Divided; Ohio State Highway System; Interstate; US; State; Scenic
← SR 23	→ SR 24

U.S. Route 24 (US 24) is a United States Numbered Highway that runs from Minturn, Colorado, to Independence Township, Michigan. In Ohio, it is an expressway and freeway for much of its length, from the Indiana state line to Maumee. From there northeast to the Michigan state line at Toledo, it is a surface highway.

== Route description ==
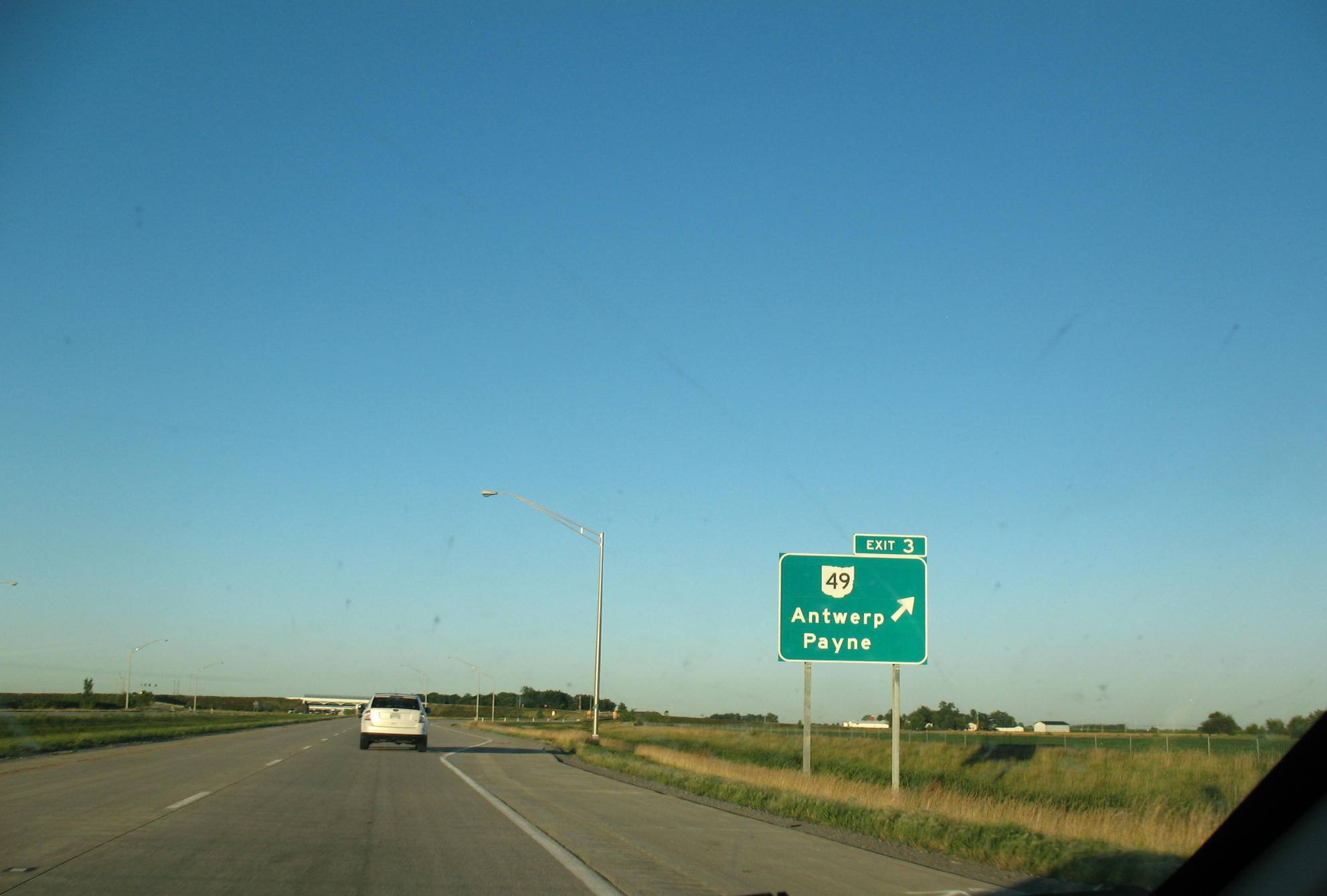
Part of the US 24 freeway in Ohio

From the Indiana state line easterly to Baltimore Street at the border of unincorporated Defiance Township and the city of Defiance, US 24 is an expressway which mostly has interchanges but features intersections with select county and township roads. From Baltimore Street to State Route 281 (SR 281) at the border of Defiance and unincorporated Noble Township, US 24 is a freeway. From SR 281 to US 6 west in Henry County's Napoleon Township, US 24 is once again an expressway. From US 6 west to Interstate 475 (I-475) in the city of Maumee, US 24 is a freeway. The route continues northeasterly as a surface street through downtown Maumee and the western side of Toledo, where it turns into Telegraph Road and stays on it past the Michigan state line. The route then continues northerly into Michigan as a north–south highway.

== History ==
The original route of US 24 closely followed the Maumee River from the Indiana state line to downtown Toledo. Much of the original route has been given county road designations, often as County Route 424. A portion of the old route that was bypassed between Defiance and Napoleon between 1964 and 1969 was designated SR 424 until 2012. The original route through Toledo followed North River Road, transitioning into Broadway and Summit streets, before turning northwesterly along Jefferson Avenue, to Collingwood Boulevard, continuing northward to Detroit Avenue via a short connection on Cherry Street. The route along Detroit Avenue from Cherry Street to Telegraph Road, and Telegraph into Michigan, has always been part of US 24 since its designation. As the Anthony Wayne Trail was completed from the south side into downtown, US 24 was shifted onto the new route, feeding into a one-way pair along Erie and Michigan streets to Monroe Street, before returning to Collingwood and its original alignment. Portions of these routes were at times concurrent with portions of US 23 and US 25.

The concurrent segment with US 25 between Conant Street/US 20 and the intersection of Anthony Wayne Trail and Detroit Street (crossing over the Ohio Turnpike) became a concurrency with SR 25 following US 25's decommissioning in Ohio and Michigan in 1973, as SR 25 replaced US 25 along Detroit Avenue to the Cherry Street/US 24 intersection. The former concurrency along Detroit Avenue to Telegraph Road became just US 24, while the northernmost section of Detroit Avenue reverted to local control. The route of US 24 in the Toledo–Maumee area would remain unchanged until 1986, when the Ohio Department of Transportation switched the US 24 and SR 25 designations, placing US 24 on Detroit Avenue and rerouting SR 25 to continue northeasterly from Monroe Street via the Erie/Michigan one-way couplet to the Greenbelt Parkway and a new terminus at I-280.

Upgrades to the route around Napoleon began in 2008. This included the construction of a new route from east of Napoleon to north of Waterville, bypassing the original routing of the highway. This rerouting was done to "alleviate safety concerns caused by the mixture of truck traffic and residential travel" along US 24's former routing. New alignments west of Defiance through to I-469 in Fort Wayne, Indiana, were also built in the late 2000s. The conversion to an expressway, first proposed in 1969, was done due to the high number of road accidents along the old alignment, which comprised only two lanes and was frequently used by tractor-trailers.

== Major intersections ==
County	Location	mi	km	Exit	Destinations	Notes
Paulding	Carryall Township	0.00	0.00		US 24 west – Fort Wayne	Continuation into Indiana
Paulding	Carryall Township	0.00	0.00	Eastern end of freeway; western end of expressway		
Paulding	Crane Township	3.32– 4.18	5.34– 6.73	3	SR 49 – Antwerp, Payne	Diamond interchange
Paulding	Emerald Township	12.38– 13.19	19.92– 21.23	13	US 127 – Sherwood, Paulding, Cecil	Diamond interchange
Defiance	Defiance Township–Defiance line	22.47– 22.96	36.16– 36.95	Eastern end of expressway; western end of freeway		
Defiance	Defiance Township–Defiance line	22.47– 22.96	36.16– 36.95	22	Baltimore Street	Partial cloverleaf interchange
Defiance	Noble Township	24.97– 25.44	40.19– 40.94	25	SR 15 / SR 18 – Bryan, Defiance	Diamond interchange
Defiance	Defiance	25.90– 26.41	41.68– 42.50	26	SR 66 – Archbold, Defiance	Diamond interchange
Defiance	Defiance–Richland Township line	27.78– 28.60	44.71– 46.03	28	SR 281 (Domersville Road)	Diamond interchange
Defiance	Defiance–Richland Township line	27.78– 28.60	44.71– 46.03	Eastern end of freeway; western end of expressway		
Henry	Napoleon Township	34– 35	55– 56	Eastern end of expressway; western end of freeway		
Henry	Napoleon Township	34– 35	55– 56	34	CR 17D – Ridgeville Corners, Okolona	Diamond interchange; opened on September 18, 2026
Henry	Napoleon Township	38.83– 39.32	62.49– 63.28	39	US 6 west – Kendallville, Chicago	Western end of US 6 concurrency; partial cloverleaf interchange
Henry	Napoleon Township	40.10– 40.34	64.53– 64.92	40	SR 108 / US 6 Bus. – Wauseon, Napoleon	Partial cloverleaf interchange
Henry	Liberty Township	41.38– 41.90	66.59– 67.43	41	Industrial Drive	Diamond interchange
Henry	Liberty Township	43.64	70.23	43	US 6 east to CR 424 / SR 110 – Bowling Green	Eastern end of US 6 concurrency; eastbound exit and westbound entrance; entrance ramp flies under eastbound lanes and merges on the left
Henry	Liberty Township	46.54– 47.16	74.90– 75.90	47	SR 109 – Liberty Center, Malinta	Diamond interchange
Lucas	Providence Township	56.91– 57.39	91.59– 92.36	57	SR 295 – Whitehouse, Grand Rapids (Ohio)	Diamond interchange
Lucas	Waterville Township	62.81– 63.32	101.08– 101.90	63	SR 64 – Whitehouse, Waterville	Diamond interchange
Lucas	Waterville–Monclova township line	65.62– 66.09	105.61– 106.36	66	Anthony Wayne Trail – Waterville	Westbound exit and eastbound entrance; exit ramp flies under US 24
Lucas	Maumee	66.49– 66.93	107.01– 107.71	67	Fallen Timbers Lane	Access to The Shops at Fallen Timbers; partial cloverleaf interchange, was originally signed Jerome Road, Stitt Road
Lucas	Maumee	67.65– 68.26	108.87– 109.85	68	I-475 / US 23 – Dayton, Ann Arbor (Michigan)	Cloverleaf interchange; signed as 68A (south) and 68B (north); exit 4 on I-475
Lucas	Maumee	67.65– 68.26	108.87– 109.85	Eastern end of freeway		
Lucas	Maumee	69.77	112.28		US 20 / SR 25 south (Conant Street) to I-80 / I-90 / Ohio Turnpike	Southern end of SR 25 concurrency
Lucas	Maumee–Toledo city line	72.14	116.10		SR 25 north (Anthony Wayne Trail) / South Detroit Avenue	Northern end of SR 25 concurrency
Lucas	Toledo	75.80	121.99		SR 2 (Airport Highway)	
Lucas	Toledo	77.48	124.69		SR 246 (Dorr Street)	
Lucas	Toledo	78.37	126.12		SR 51 (Monroe Street)	
Lucas	Toledo	78.54– 78.65	126.40– 126.57		I-75 – Detroit, Dayton	Exit 203B on I-75
Lucas	Toledo	79.42	127.81		SR 120 (Central Avenue)	
Lucas	Toledo	82.76	133.19		SR 184 (Alexis Road)	Last intersection as Telegraph Road
Lucas	Toledo	83.33	134.11		US 24 north (Telegraph Road) – Monroe, Detroit	Continuation into Michigan
1.000 mi = 1.609 km; 1.000 km = 0.621 mi: Concurrency terminus; Incomplete access

U.S. Route 24
Previous state: Indiana	Ohio	Next state: Michigan
