= Ohio State Route 246 =

State highway in Lucas County, Ohio, US

State Route 246

Route information
- Maintained by ODOT
- Length: 7.63 mi (12.28 km)
- Existed: 1925–present

Major junctions
- West end: I-475 / US 23 in Toledo
- US 20 in Toledo; US 24 in Toledo
- East end: SR 51 in Toledo

Location
- Country: United States
- State: Ohio
- Counties: Lucas

Highway system
- Ohio State Highway System; Interstate; US; State; Scenic
← SR 245	→ SR 247

State Route 246 (SR 246) is a 7.77-mile-long (12.50 km) east–west state highway in the northwestern part of the U.S. state of Ohio. The western terminus of SR 246 is at the interchange with Interstate 475/U.S. Route 23 (I-475/US 23) at the western border of Toledo. Its eastern terminus is at a signalized intersection with SR 51 in downtown Toledo.

Created in the late 1920s, this state route is located entirely within the city limits of Toledo. All but the easternmost block (17th Street) of SR 246 is known as Dorr Street.

== Route description ==
All of SR 246 is located within the city of Toledo in Lucas County. This highway is not included as a part of the National Highway System.

== History ==
The SR 246 designation was established in 1925. It was originally routed along the portion of its present alignment between Secor Road at the southwest corner of the University of Toledo campus, at the time a state-maintained roadway that carried the designation of SR 183, and its current eastern terminus in downtown Toledo.

In 1934, SR 246 was extended from Secor Road to Reynolds Road (U.S. 20). Three years later, the highway was extended west out of Toledo via Dorr Road, Crissey Road and Frankfort Road to a new terminus at SR 295 south of Berkey. Then, in 1939, SR 246 was extended again on the west side, this time utilizing Frankfort Road west of SR 295 to Fulton–Lucas Road, then south to County Road L (CR L), which SR 246 then used heading west across the entire width of Fulton County, and into Williams County. Through Williams County, it followed what is now CR 20N and CR O to the SR 15 intersection, where it then used what is now the westernmost stretch of US 20A to get to a new western terminus at US 20 southwest of Pioneer. The 1937 and 1939 extensions of SR 246 were reversed by 1957, when the portions of the route west of US 20 in the western end of Toledo were removed from the state highway system. In 2021, the route was extended to I-475 and US 23 in preparation for an interchange there, which opened in August 2021.

== Major intersections ==
The entire route is in Toledo, Lucas County.

mi	km	Destinations	Notes
0.0– 0.1	0.0– 0.16	Dorr Street	Western terminus; continuation of roadway
0.0– 0.1	0.0– 0.16	I-475 / US 23	Exit 11 on I-475; opened 2021
1.6	2.6	US 20 (North Reynolds Road)	Western terminus (1957–2021)
6.1	9.8	US 24 (North Detroit Avenue)	
7.7	12.4	SR 51 (Monroe Street) / 17th Street	Eastern terminus
1.000 mi = 1.609 km; 1.000 km = 0.621 mi
