= Ohio State Route 582 =

State highway in northwestern Ohio, US

State Route 582

Route information
- Maintained by ODOT
- Length: 20.08 mi (32.32 km)
- Existed: 1940–present

Major junctions
- West end: SR 65 near Haskins
- I-75 near Haskins; US 23 near Luckey
- East end: SR 105 near Woodville

Location
- Country: United States
- State: Ohio
- Counties: Wood, Sandusky

Highway system
- Ohio State Highway System; Interstate; US; State; Scenic
← SR 581	→ SR 584

State Route 582 (SR 582) is an east–west state highway in the northwestern portion of the U.S. state of Ohio. The western terminus of SR 582 is at a T-intersection with SR 65 nearly 2 miles (3.2 km) west of Haskins. Its eastern terminus is also at a T-intersection, this time with SR 105 less than 0.50 miles (0.80 km) southwest of Woodville.

== Route description ==
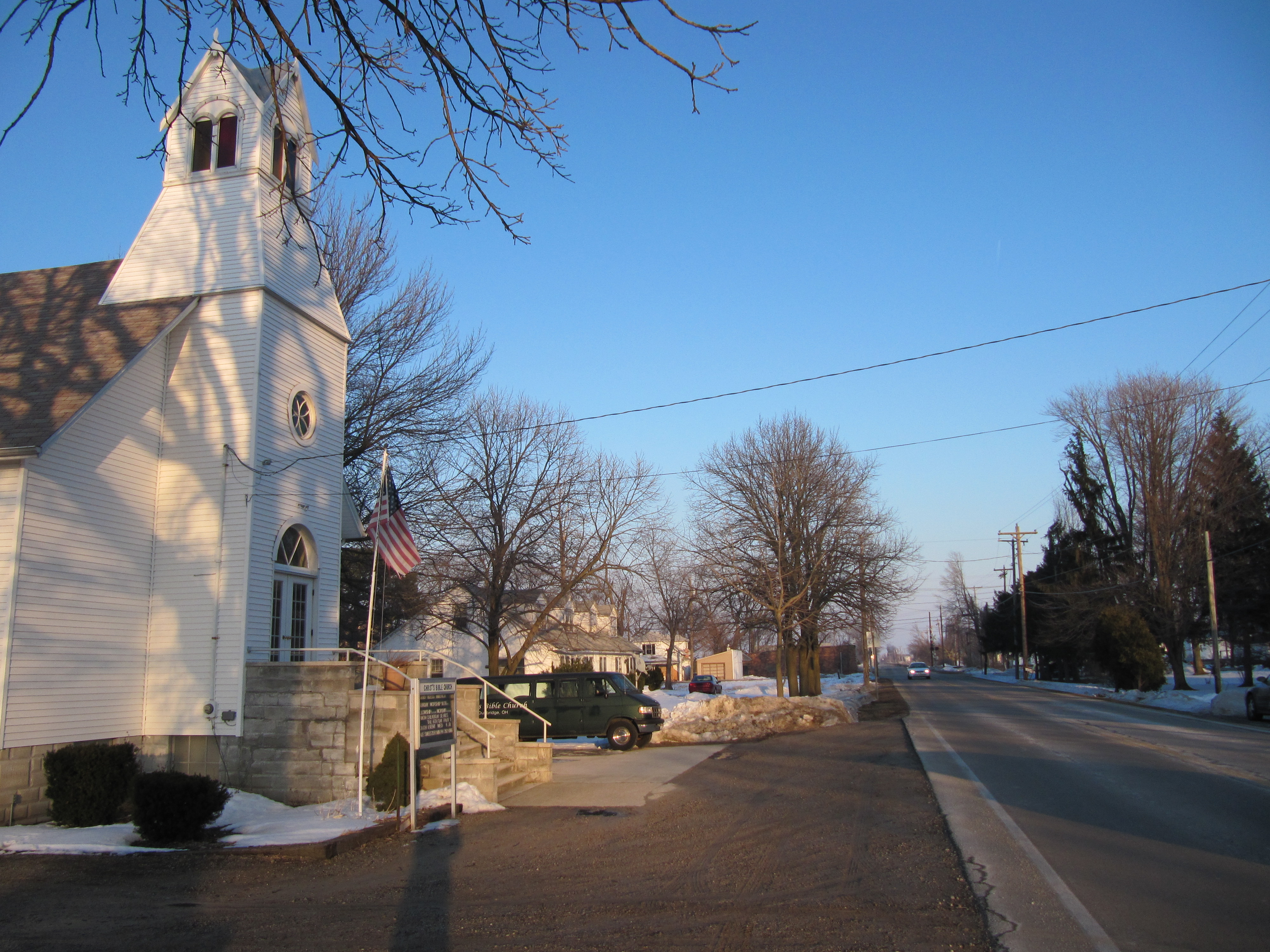
SR 582 in Dunbridge.

SR 582 passes through the northern half of Wood County and a small portion of northwestern Sandusky County along its way. No part of SR 582 is incorporated within the National Highway System, a system of routes determined to be most important for the nation's economy, mobility and defense.

== History ==
SR 582 was established in 1940. Its original routing matches that which it utilizes to this day between SR 65 and SR 105 through northern Wood County and northwestern Sandusky County. SR 582 has not experienced any significant changes since its inception.

== Major intersections ==
County	Location	mi	km	Destinations	Notes
Wood	Washington Township	0.00	0.00	SR 65 (West River Road)	
Wood	Haskins	2.61	4.20	SR 64 (Haskins Road) – Waterville, Bowling Green	
Wood	Middleton Township	5.34	8.59	SR 25 (Dixie Highway) – Bowling Green, Perrysburg	
Wood	Middleton Township	6.88	11.07	I-75 – Dayton, Toledo	Exit 187 (I-75)
Wood	Webster Township	10.05	16.17	SR 199 – Fostoria, Perrysburg, Toledo	
Wood–Sandusky county line	Troy–Woodville township line	18.35	29.53	US 23 north	Western end of US 23 concurrency
Wood–Sandusky county line	Troy–Woodville township line	18.39	29.60	US 23 south	Eastern end of US 23 concurrency
Sandusky	Woodville Township	20.08	32.32	SR 105	
1.000 mi = 1.609 km; 1.000 km = 0.621 mi: Concurrency terminus
