= Interstate 475 (Ohio) =

Interstate Highway in Ohio

Interstate 475
- Rosa Parks Highway
- I-475 highlighted in red

Route information
- Auxiliary route of I-75
- Maintained by ODOT
- Length: 20.37 mi (32.78 km)
- NHS: Entire route

Major junctions
- South end: I-75 / US 23 in Perrysburg
- US 24 in Maumee; US 20 / SR 120 in Toledo; US 23 in Toledo
- East end: I-75 in Toledo

Location
- Country: United States
- State: Ohio
- Counties: Wood, Lucas

Highway system
- Interstate Highway System; Main; Auxiliary; Suffixed; Business; Future; Ohio State Highway System; Interstate; US; State; Scenic
← I-471	→ I-480

Interstate 475 (I-475) is an auxiliary Interstate Highway in Ohio that is a 20.37-mile (32.78 km) western bypass of Toledo. The southern terminus is I-75 exit 192 near Perrysburg. From the southern terminus to exit 14, I-475 is cosigned with US Route 23 (US 23) and is signed the north–south section of I-475. From exit 14 to the eastern (northernmost) terminus at I-75 exit 204 in central Toledo (north of downtown), it is signed the east–west section of I-475.

Although I-475 crosses I-80/I-90 (the Ohio Turnpike), there is no interchange and one must drive a couple of miles through surface streets between I-475 exit 6 and I-80/I-90 exit 59.

I-475 is named the Rosa Parks Highway in honor of Rosa Parks, who had helped organize the Montgomery bus boycott.

== Route description ==
I-475 is a half-beltway bypassing Downtown Toledo on its western side as mostly a north–south segment and a largely east–west segment on the north side of Toledo. It has almost a half-square shape on the map consisting of the top and left sides of the square. It is much less direct than its parent I-75 through Toledo; the entire route of I-475 uses 20 miles (32 km) to connect exits 12 miles (19 km) apart on I-75.

I-475 parallels what was US 23 on its north–south segment (US 23 has been realigned to it); it has Ann Arbor, Michigan, as a control city northbound (via US 23) and Columbus and Dayton as control cities southbound; it reaches neither of the three cities. On its northern segment it parallels State Route 120 (SR 120) and has Toledo as a control city to the east. Rural when built, it has much suburban-style development along its route.

It has no direct access to the Ohio Turnpike, access to which requires the use of either SR 2 to and from the west, I-75 to or from the east, or surface streets to US 20.

== History ==
I-475 was opened in sections with the first opened in 1967 between US 20, at the current I–75 interchange near Perrysburg, and US 24, near Maumee. By 1969, the second portion opened between US 24 and US 23, near Sylvania. In this year, the southern terminus was moved from US 20, near Perrysburg, to the southern interchange with I–75. The final section opened in 1971 and was between US 23 and I-75 near Downtown Toledo.

Between 2010 and 2012, the easternmost sections of I-475 were reconstructed. This included the redevelopment of several overpasses, as well as the removal of an outdated interchange with Central Avenue in favor of an interchange with a newly constructed extension of ProMedica Parkway for easier access. Additional lanes were also added at the I-75/I-475 junction at I-475's eastern terminus.

Since July 2015, work has been ongoing along the western stretch of I-475 in Lucas County along its concurrency with US 23 to widen the freeway from two to three lanes in both directions to meet the needs of development in the western suburbs of Toledo. As part of this, two interchanges are being built and a preexisting one has been upgraded. The interchange with US 20 in Sylvania Township was upgraded from a partial cloverleaf interchange to a single-point urban interchange by November 2016. Interchanges at SR 246 and US 20 Alternate (US 20A) in Springfield Township and Maumee are under planning and construction, with the SR 246 interchange, a dumbbell interchange, opened on August 2, 2021, in time for the Solheim Cup. Construction on the US 20A interchange has commenced as of late 2023.

In Perrysburg, work was completed in late 2017 on upgrading the diamond interchange with SR 25 into a diverging diamond interchange.

== Exit list ==
County	Location	mi	km	Old exit	New exit	Destinations	Notes
Wood	Perrysburg	0.00	0.00	—	1	I-75 / US 23 south – Toledo, Dayton	Southbound exit and northbound entrance; southern end of US 23 concurrency; southern terminus signed as exits 1A (north to I-75) and left 1B (south to I-75); I-75 exit 192; tri-stack interchange.
Wood	Perrysburg	0.82	1.32	1	2	SR 25 (Dixie Highway) – Perrysburg, Bowling Green	
Lucas	Maumee	4.18	6.73	2	4	US 24 (Anthony Wayne Trail) – Napoleon, Waterville, Maumee	Signed as exits 4A (east) and 4B (west) on collector–distributor lanes; exit 68 on US 24
Lucas	Maumee	5.80	9.33	—	5	US 20A (Illinois Avenue / Dana Drive)	Connected to exit 6 via collector-distributor lanes
Lucas	Maumee	6.15	9.90	—	6	To I-80 / I-90 / Ohio Turnpike / Salisbury Road / Dussel Drive	Salisbury Road runs west, Dussel Drive runs east; added 1989
Lucas	Springfield Township	8.32	13.39	3	8	SR 2 (Airport Highway) – Toledo Express Airport, Swanton, Toledo	Signed as exits 8A (east) and 8B (west) southbound
Lucas	Springfield Township	11.48	18.48	—	11	SR 246 east (Dorr Street)	Western terminus of SR 246; added 2021
Lucas	Sylvania Township	12.65	20.36	4	13	US 20 (Central Avenue) / SR 120	
Lucas	Sylvania Township	13.51	21.74	—	14	US 23 north – Sylvania, Ann Arbor	Northern end of US 23 concurrency; route orientation changes between north–south and east–west
Lucas	Sylvania Township	14.96	24.08	—	15	Corey Road	Eastbound exit and westbound entrance
Lucas	Toledo	16.08	25.88	—	16	Talmadge Road	Westbound exit and eastbound entrance
Lucas	Toledo	17.16	27.62	—	17	Secor Road	
Lucas	Toledo	17.64	28.39	—	18A	SR 51 north (Monroe Street)	Westbound exit to northbound SR 51 and eastbound entrance from southbound SR 51 only
Lucas	Toledo	18.19	29.27	—	18B	Douglas Road	Westbound exit and eastbound entrance
Lucas	Toledo			—	19	Central Avenue, Jackman Road	Jackman Road was signed westbound only; entrances were via Upton Avenue and from Central Avenue via Kelly Avenue; exit removed 2012
Lucas	Toledo	19.20	30.90	—	19	ProMedica Parkway	ProMedica Parkway replaced the Central Avenue exit in 2012
Lucas	Toledo	19.93	32.07	—	20	I-75 – Detroit, Dayton	Eastbound exit and westbound entrance; northern terminus signed as exits 20A (north) and 20B (south); I-75 exit 204
Lucas	Toledo	20.35	32.75	—	205A	Jeep Parkway, Willys Parkway	Former eastbound exit and westbound entrance; exit number corresponded to I-75
1.000 mi = 1.609 km; 1.000 km = 0.621 mi: Concurrency terminus; Incomplete access; Unopened
