= Mount Cory, Ohio =

- Village
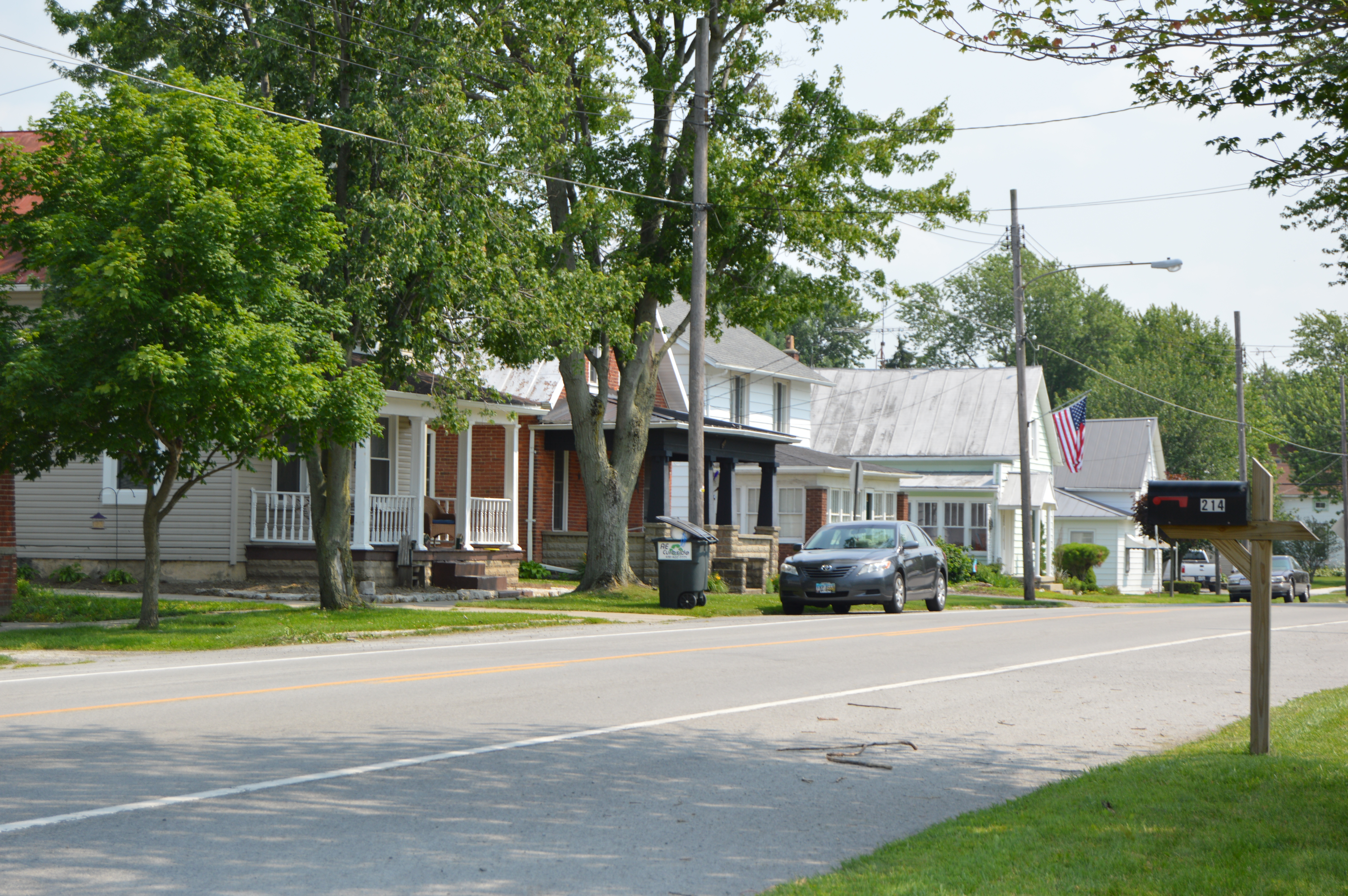
- Houses on Main Street

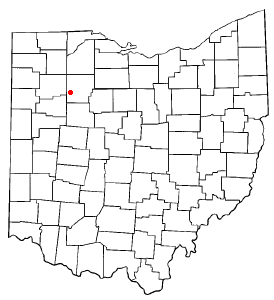
- Location of Mount Cory, Ohio

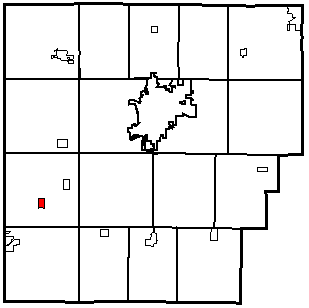
- Location of Mount Cory in Hancock County
- Coordinates: 40°56′06″N 83°49′25″W
- Country: United States
- State: Ohio
- County: Hancock

Government
  - Type: Village council

Area
  - Total: 0.39 sq mi (1.00 km^{2})
  - Land: 0.39 sq mi (1.00 km^{2})
  - Water: 0 sq mi (0.00 km^{2})
- Elevation: 814 ft (248 m)

Population (2020)
  - Total: 225
  - Density: 583.0/sq mi (225.08/km^{2})
- Time zone: UTC-5 (Eastern (EST))
  - Summer (DST): UTC-4 (EDT)
- ZIP code: 45868
- Area code: 419
- FIPS code: 39-52668
- GNIS feature ID: 2399409

Mount Cory is a village in Hancock County, Ohio, United States. The population was 225 at the 2020 census.

== History ==
Mount Cory was originally called Cory, and under the latter name was laid out in 1872 when the railroad was extended to that point. The village was named for D. J. Cory, proprietor of the town site. A post office has been in operation at Mount Cory since 1873.

== Geography ==
According to the United States Census Bureau, the village has a total area of 0.38 square miles (0.98 km^{2}), all land.

== Demographics ==
Historical population
Census	Pop.	Note	%±
1890	334		—
1900	312		−6.6%
1910	290		−7.1%
1920	252		−13.1%
1930	237		−6.0%
1940	273		15.2%
1950	302		10.6%
1960	301		−0.3%
1970	302		0.3%
1980	276		−8.6%
1990	245		−11.2%
2000	203		−17.1%
2010	204		0.5%
2020	225		10.3%
U.S. Decennial Census

=== 2010 census ===
As of the census of 2010, there were 204 people, 77 households, and 64 families living in the village. The population density was 536.8 inhabitants per square mile (207.3/km^{2}). There were 87 housing units at an average density of 228.9 per square mile (88.4/km^{2}). The racial makeup of the village was 96.1% White, 0.5% Native American, 1.5% Asian, and 2.0% from two or more races.

There were 77 households, of which 40.3% had children under the age of 18 living with them, 68.8% were married couples living together, 6.5% had a female householder with no husband present, 7.8% had a male householder with no wife present, and 16.9% were non-families. 15.6% of all households were made up of individuals, and 7.8% had someone living alone who was 65 years of age or older. The average household size was 2.65 and the average family size was 2.89.

The median age in the village was 39.7 years. 28.4% of residents were under the age of 18; 5.4% were between the ages of 18 and 24; 23.1% were from 25 to 44; 29% were from 45 to 64; and 14.2% were 65 years of age or older. The gender makeup of the village was 50.5% male and 49.5% female.

=== 2000 census ===
As of the census of 2000, there were 203 people, 80 households, and 61 families living in the village. The population density was 528.1 inhabitants per square mile (203.9/km^{2}). There were 86 housing units at an average density of 223.7 per square mile (86.4/km^{2}). The racial makeup of the village was 97.04% White, 0.49% Native American, and 2.46% from two or more races. Hispanic or Latino of any race were 0.99% of the population.

There were 80 households, out of which 32.5% had children under the age of 18 living with them, 62.5% were married couples living together, 8.8% had a female householder with no husband present, and 23.8% were non-families. 21.3% of all households were made up of individuals, and 11.3% had someone living alone who was 65 years of age or older. The average household size was 2.54 and the average family size was 2.90.

In the village, the population was spread out, with 27.1% under the age of 18, 5.4% from 18 to 24, 31.0% from 25 to 44, 23.2% from 45 to 64, and 13.3% who were 65 years of age or older. The median age was 39 years. For every 100 females there were 103.0 males. For every 100 females age 18 and over, there were 92.2 males.

The median income for a household in the village was $40,833, and the median income for a family was $45,000. Males had a median income of $37,500 versus $21,250 for females. The per capita income for the village was $20,250. None of the families and 1.0% of the population were living below the poverty line.
