= U.S. Route 23 in Ohio =

Section of U.S. Highway in Ohio, United States

U.S. Route 23
- Route of US 23 highlighted in red

Route information
- Maintained by ODOT
- Length: 234.83 mi (377.92 km)
- Existed: 1926–present

Major junctions
- South end: US 23 at U.S. Grant Bridge in Portsmouth
- US 52 in Portsmouth; US 35 / US 50 in Chillicothe; US 22 in Circleville; I-70 / I-71 in Columbus; US 36 / US 42 in Delaware; US 30 in Upper Sandusky; US 224 near Fostoria; US 6 near Bradner; I-75 / I-475 / US 20 in Perrysburg; US 24 in Maumee
- North end: US 23 / US 223 at the Michigan state line in Sylvania

Location
- Country: United States
- State: Ohio
- Counties: Scioto, Pike, Ross, Pickaway, Franklin, Delaware, Marion, Wyandot, Seneca, Sandusky, Wood, Lucas

Highway system
- United States Numbered Highway System; List; Special; Divided; Ohio State Highway System; Interstate; US; State; Scenic
← SR 22	→ SR 23

U.S. Route 23 (US 23) is a United States Numbered Highway that runs from Jacksonville, Florida, to Mackinaw City, Michigan. In the state of Ohio, it is a major north–south state highway that runs from the Kentucky border at Portsmouth to the Michigan border at Sylvania.

== Route description ==
The route crosses over the Ohio River via the U.S. Grant Bridge into the city of Portsmouth. Through downtown Portsmouth, it follows parallel one-way streets; northbound traffic is on Gay Street and southbound on Chillicothe Street. These roads merge into Scioto Trail, which becomes a divided highway north of Rosemount, and again north of Lucasville, through Piketon to just south of Waverly.

Within Waverly, the route runs concurrently with State Route 104 (SR 104), in addition to a four-block concurrency with SR 335 that ends in downtown Waverly. The concurrency with SR 104 ends just south of Chillicothe at which point US 23 becomes an expressway. The route bypasses Chillicothe to the east, including a short concurrency with US 35 before once again becoming a divided highway near Kingston. It continues as such through Circleville to the southern edge of Columbus, at the southern junction of Interstate 270 (I-270).

=== Columbus ===
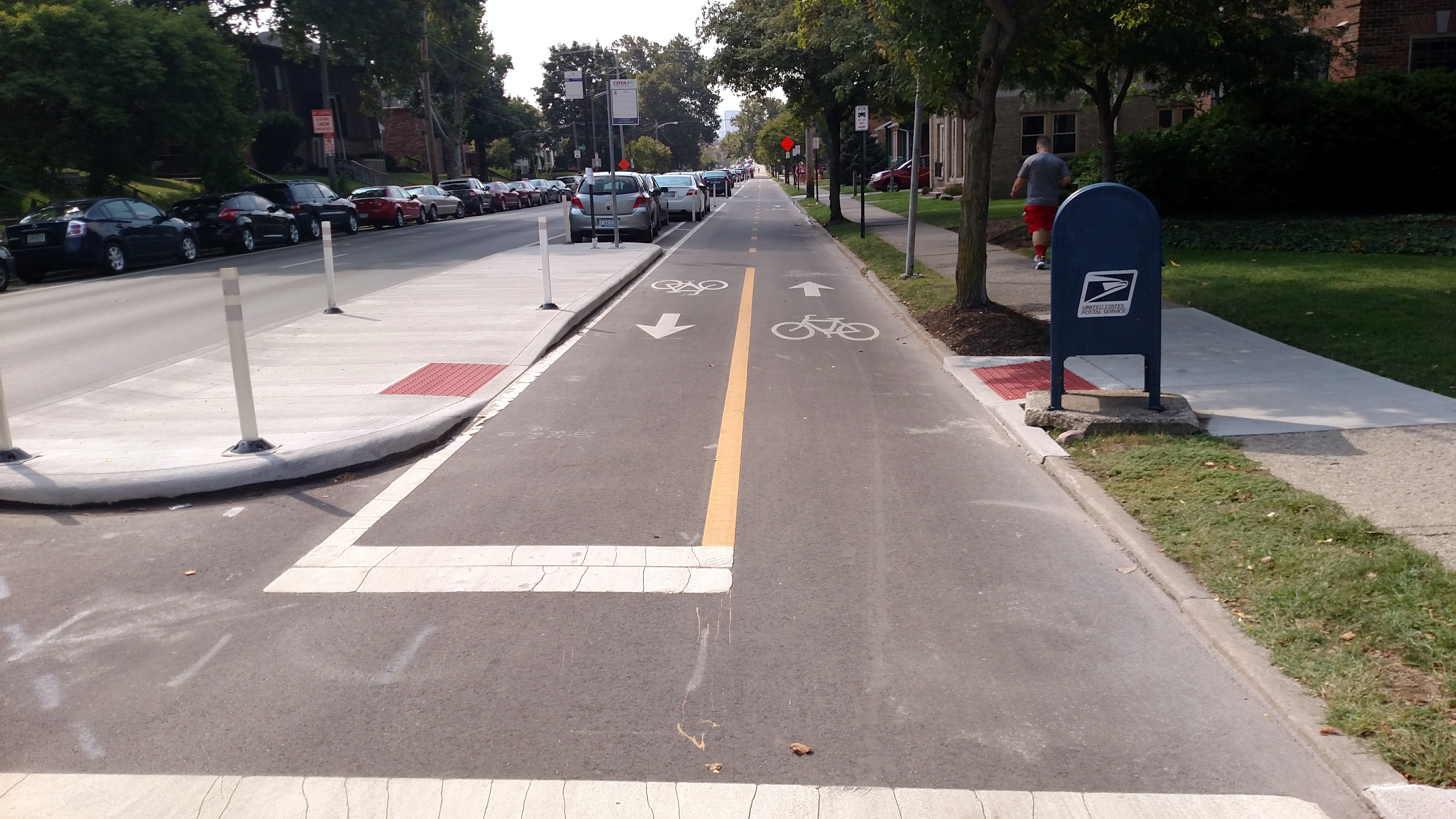
Protected bike lane and bus stop island on Summit Street near the Ohio State University campus

In downtown Columbus, the route is applied to a one-way pair. It first jogs easterly via Fulton Street (north) and Mound Street (south) before continuing northerly with northbound traffic on Fourth Street and southbound traffic on Third Street, which becomes Summit Street north of Fifth Avenue. The one-way pair ends at Hudson Street on the border of the SoHud and Glen Echo neighborhoods; both directions of US 23 jog westerly onto Hudson Street before continuing northerly on Indianola Avenue, closely paralleling I-71. The route then moves westerly again via Morse Road, then north again onto High Street on the north edge of the East Beechwold neighborhood. North of the northern junction with I-270, High Street becomes Columbus Pike.

The section immediately north of the northern junction with I-270 was upgraded with a northbound-only set of express lanes which passes under Dimension Drive, Campus View Boulevard, Radio City Boulevard, and Flint Road, with the former alignment of US 23 providing access to those roads. This configuration, known as the "Trench", opened to traffic in September 2015, and its construction coincides with a reconfiguration of the I-270 exit. After the Trench, US 23 leaves Columbus heading north.

=== North of Columbus ===
Heading north, US 23 becomes a four-lane road with a grass median, intersections at street level, and numerous public and private driveways. Starting at a short concurrency with US 42 south of Delaware, the route becomes a freeway through downtown Delaware, intersecting with US 36 and ending the concurrency with US 42. North of downtown Delaware, US 23 becomes a five-lane road, with a center lane dedicated for left-hand turns, from both directions. When it reaches the Delaware Dam and Delaware State Park south of Waldo, a grass median returns. From Waldo to southwest of Carey, the route is an expressway, all intersections with numbered U.S. and state routes are Interstate-style interchanges, while most county and local streets that intersect, are at street level and unsignaled. US 23 bypasses Waldo, Marion, and Upper Sandusky to the east. To the east and north of Upper Sandusky, US 23 runs concurrently with US 30 for about 10 miles (16 km). Southwest of Carey the route then departs the expressway passing through Carey, running concurrently with SR 103 while the expressway continues westerly as SR 15. Within Carey, the concurrency with SR 103 ends, and a concurrency with SR 199 begins. The two cosigned routes continue as a rural highway to Fostoria.

Within Fostoria, US 23 runs concurrently with SR 18 while turning westerly along Lytle Street, then northerly along the Midblock Underpass in concurrency with SR 12. At the northern end of the expressway, SR 12 departs while US 23, still concurrent with SR 18/SR 199, continues westerly along South Street, then northerly along County Line Street. SR 18/SR 199 departs within Fostoria city limits, while US 23 continues northerly and becomes Fostoria Road. Northeast of Bradner, the route has a junction with US 6.

Northwest of Woodville, the route runs concurrently with US 20; the highway continues northwesterly to Perrysburg. There, US 23 begins a brief wrong-way concurrency with I-75, then departs for a concurrency with I-475, the western bypass of the Toledo metropolitan area. US 23 and I-475 run concurrently for the latter route's entire north–south portion, until I-475 departs in Sylvania to become an east–west aligned route. US 23 then continues northerly into Michigan as a freeway.

== History ==
Before the establishment of the U.S. Numbered Highway System in 1926, the route of what would eventually become US 23 was numbered as SR 4 from Portsmouth to Marion; SR 22 from Marion to Carey; SR 63 from Carey to Fostoria; SR 199 from Fostoria to Millbury; and SR 2 from Millbury to Toledo. Over the years, portions of US 23 have been realigned to divided highway, freeway, or expressway portions. Among these are a bypass of Circleville built in 1958; the Marion–Carey expressway routing, on which work began in 1962; and a bypass of Chillicothe, on which work began in 1966.

On the 1926 Ohio Department of Highways and Public Works map, published before the finalization of the U.S. Numbered Highway System in late 1926, US 23 followed its current routing from Fostoria to Woodville, then continued north along present-day Fostoria Road into Millbury and northwest along present-day SR 51 (Woodville Road) into East Toledo. There, it followed East Broadway Avenue, Starr Avenue, and Main Street to the Cherry Street Bridge (now the Martin Luther King Bridge) across the Maumee River. The route then followed Cherry Street (present-day SR 120) to Detroit Avenue (US 24), before turning west onto Laskey Road and north onto Lewis Avenue. On the 1927 map, the Fostoria–Toledo routing was shifted westerly, taking a northwest–southeast route that was originally designated SR 63 between Fostoria and Perrysburg, then East River Road into Toledo. It crossed the Maumee River via the Fassett Street Bridge, then followed South, Sumner, Logan, Summit, and Huron streets to rejoin its original routing. The Fostoria–Millbury routing was designated SR 199, and the Millbury–Toledo routing became SR 102, which in turn became present-day SR 51 in 1955. By 1940, US 23 was shifted westerly again in Toledo, taking the Anthony Wayne Bridge to Summit Street, then to Jefferson Avenue and Collingwood Boulevard before rejoining the previous routing.

US 23 was realigned c. 1960 to follow Monroe Street northwesterly out of Toledo, joining with the first constructed segment of its current freeway routing in Sylvania. The freeway was extended southerly to US 20 (Central Avenue) by 1964.

By 1969, the entire western freeway bypass of Toledo was complete, carrying the current routings of both US 23 and I-475. In addition, US 23 and SR 199 were swapped north of Fostoria in 1969, as US 23 reverted to its pre-1927 routing between Fostoria and Woodville, then running concurrently with US 20 from there to Perrysburg. The 1927–1969 routing of US 23 between Fostoria and Perrysburg thus became part of SR 199.

A plan was proposed by the Ohio Department of Transportation (ODOT) in July 2020 to improve safety along US 23 in Wyandot County by reconfiguring several intersections and closing others to eliminate cross traffic and turns across opposing traffic for the stretch of US 23 between the interchange at SR 231 in Marion County and the interchange at SR 199 south of Upper Sandusky. After public comments, the proposal was revised to drop one intersection from the plan over concerns about the impact on emergency services. The rest of the plan was rejected by the Wyandot County Commission in May 2021 because of the impacts on the community and the community's preference for an interchange at SR 294.

Weigh stations were once located on US 23 just north of the split with US 35, but they were decommissioned and later converted into truck parking in 2023. Ross County had wanted the space to be utilized into a full interchange with Marietta and Seney Roads as a part of their 2008 Thoroughfare Plan.

== Future ==
North of Upper Sandusky in Salem Township, Wyandot County, there have been a number of serious crashes at the intersection with County Road 44 and Township Road 44 from 2016 to 2021. To improve its safety, beginning April 11, 2022, ODOT will convert the intersection to a pair of right-in/right-outs and close the median crossover. Once this conversion is completed, the stretch of US 23 from SR 199 south of Upper Sandusky, through this junction, will be free of cross traffic and turns across opposing traffic.

An interchange is planned to be constructed at the intersection with State Route 762 in Pickaway County.

In 2021, ODOT reopened a study of the US 23 corridor between the village of Waldo and I-270.

US 23 in Ohio has been planned to be incorporated into Interstate 73, with a renewed push in the 2020s.

== Major intersections ==
County	Location	mi	km	Exit	Destinations	Notes
Ohio River		0.00	0.00		US 23 south (Country Music Highway)	Continuation into Kentucky
Ohio River		0.00	0.00		U.S. Grant Bridge; Kentucky–Ohio state line	
Scioto	Portsmouth	0.45	0.72		SR 73 west / SR 104 north / Ohio River Scenic Byway Alt. east (US 23 Bus. north) / US 23 north	Southern end of southbound SR 73/SR 104/ORB Alt. concurrency; eastern terminus of SR 73; southern terminus of SR 104; southern terminus of US 23 Bus.
Scioto	Portsmouth	0.56	0.90		SR 73 / Ohio River Scenic Byway Alt. west / SR 104 north (2nd Street west)	Northern end of southbound SR 73/SR 104/ORB Alt. concurrency
Scioto	Portsmouth	0.99	1.59		US 23 Bus. south (Chillicothe Street south)	Northern terminus of US 23 Bus.; no access from US 23 north (Gay Street)
Scioto	Portsmouth	1.06	1.71		US 52 / Ohio River Scenic Byway east / US 23 Truck (11th Street)	One-way street; northern terminus of US 23 Truck
Scioto	Portsmouth	1.13	1.82		US 52 / Ohio River Scenic Byway west / US 23 Truck south (12th Street) to SR 73 west / SR 104 north	One-way street
Scioto	Lucasville	11.43	18.39		SR 728 east (Lucasville-Minford Road) / SR 348 west – Otway	Eastern terminus of SR 348; western terminus of SR 728
Scioto	Lucasville	11.92	19.18		SR 823 – Ironton	Interchange
Pike	Scioto Township	20.63	33.20		American Centrifuge Facility	Half-folded diamond interchange; access to Portsmouth Gaseous Diffusion Plant
Pike	Seal Township	23.08	37.14		SR 32 / SR 124 – Jackson, Cincinnati	Diamond interchange
Pike	Waverly				Pride Drive (SR 220 Truck)	Southern end of SR 220 Truck concurrency
Pike	Waverly	28.53	45.91		SR 104 south (Lake White Road)	Southern end of SR 104 concurrency
Pike	Waverly	29.17	46.94		SR 220 (Market Street) / SR 220 Truck ends / SR 335 begins	Southern end of SR 335 concurrency; northern end of SR 220 Truck concurrency; northern terminus of SR 220 Truck; counterclockwise terminus of SR 335
Pike	Waverly	29.52	47.51		SR 335 east (Clough Street)	Northern end of SR 335 concurrency
Ross	Franklin Township	35.63	57.34		SR 372 east (Stoney Creek Road)	
Ross	Scioto Township	41.40	66.63	41	US 23 Bus. / SR 104 north (Bridge Street) / Three Locks Road	Northern end of SR 104 concurrency; southern end of freeway; US 23 Bus, not signed southbound
Ross	Scioto Township	43.22	69.56	43A	US 50 (Eastern Avenue) to US 35 east	
Ross	Scioto Township	43.70	70.33	43B	US 35 / US 50 east – Jackson, Athens	Southern end of US 35 concurrency; southbound left exit and northbound entrance
Ross	Scioto Township	44.98	72.39	44	Main Street to US 50 west – Chillicothe	
Ross	Scioto Township	46.02	74.06	46	US 35 west – Dayton	Northern end of US 35 concurrency; northbound left exit and southbound entrance
Ross	Springfield Township	48.78	78.50	48	US 23 Bus. south / SR 159 (Bridge Street) – Kingston, Chillicothe	Serves Adena Regional Medical Center; US 23 Bus. not signed northbound
Ross	Green Township	50.78	81.72	50	SR 207 north	Northern end of freeway
Pickaway	Pickaway Township	57.24	92.12		SR 361 east	
Pickaway	Circleville	63.92	102.87		US 22 / SR 56 – Circleville, Washington Court House	Five-ramp partial cloverleaf; northbound exit via Mound Street
Pickaway	South Bloomfield	72.14	116.10		SR 316 east (Ashville Road) – Ashville	Southern end of SR 316 concurrency
Pickaway	South Bloomfield	72.42	116.55		SR 316 west (North Street)	Northern end of SR 316 concurrency
Pickaway	South Bloomfield	72.75	117.08		SR 752 east	
Pickaway	Harrison Township	76.24	122.70		SR 762 – Commercial Point	
Franklin	Hamilton Township	80.37	129.34		SR 665 west / SR 317 east – Groveport, Rickenbacker Airport	
Franklin	Hamilton Township	83.36– 83.39	134.15– 134.20	83	I-270 (Columbus Bypass) to I-71	Interchange; signed as exits 83A (east) and 83B (west) southbound; I-270 exit 52
Franklin	Columbus	86.28	138.85		SR 104 north to US 33 SR 104 south to I-71	Interchange; SR 104 exit 91
Franklin	Columbus	89.04– 89.13	143.30– 143.44		I-70 / I-71	Interchange; northbound entrance only; I-70 exit 100B; to be replaced by new interchange north of freeway
Franklin	Columbus	89.04– 89.13	143.30– 143.44		US 33 (3rd Street)	Southern end of northbound US 33 east concurrency; one-way street, inbound access only from US 33
Franklin	Columbus	89.04– 89.13	143.30– 143.44		US 33 east (Livingston Avenue east)	Northern end of northbound US 33 east concurrency; southern end of US 33 west concurrency
Franklin	Columbus	89.13	143.44		I-71 south / I-70 west	I-70 exit 100B
Franklin	Columbus	89.13	143.44		I-70 east – Wheeling	Future off-ramp to replace old ramp south of freeway
Franklin	Columbus	89.13	143.44		I-70 / I-71	Future on-ramp to replace old ramp south of freeway; access from I-70 east/I-71 north only
Franklin	Columbus	89.32	143.75		US 62 / SR 3 north (Main Street) to I-71 north	Southern end of US 62/SR 3 concurrency; one-way street
Franklin	Columbus	89.41	143.89		US 62 / SR 3 south (Rich Street) to SR 315	One-way street, outbound access only to US 62/SR 3
Franklin	Columbus	89.75	144.44		US 62 north / US 40 / SR 16 (Broad Street)	Northern end of US 62 concurrency
Franklin	Columbus	89.95	144.76		US 33 (Long Street) / SR 3 north (Long Street east)	One-way street, inbound access only from US 33
Franklin	Columbus	90.04	144.91		US 33 west / SR 3 south (Spring Street)	Northern end of US 33 west/SR 3 concurrency; one-way street
Franklin	Columbus				Convention Center Parking	Southbound exit and entrance only; interchange
Franklin	Columbus	90.66	145.90		I-670 to I-71 – Dayton, Airport	I-670 exit 4
Franklin	Worthington	99.66	160.39		SR 161 (Dublin Granville Road)	
Franklin	Worthington	101.23	162.91	101A	I-270 east to I-71	Interchange; I-270 exit 23; SR 315 exit 12A; no exit number southbound; consolidated into one single exit southbound
Franklin	Worthington	101.23	162.91	101B	I-270 west / SR 315	Interchange; I-270 exit 23; SR 315 exit 12A; no exit number southbound; consolidated into one single exit southbound
Franklin	Flint	101.69– 101.97	163.65– 164.10		Campus View Boulevard / Flint Road	Interchange northbound via local lanes; at-grade intersections southbound
Delaware	Orange Township	104.36	167.95		SR 750 – Powell, Columbus Zoo	
Delaware	Delaware	111.74	179.83		SR 315 south (Olentangy River Road)	
Delaware	Delaware	113.36– 113.60	182.44– 182.82		US 42 south	Southern end of US 42 concurrency; partial interchange via connector road; serves Delaware Municipal Airport; southern end of freeway
Delaware	Delaware	114.86	184.85	114	US 42 north / US 36 (William Street) to SR 37	Northern end of US 42 concurrency; northbound exit and southbound entrance
Delaware	Delaware	115.09	185.22	115	SR 37 (Central Avenue) to US 42 north / US 36	Southbound exit and northbound entrance
Delaware	Delaware	115.96	186.62		N. Sandusky Street	Partial interchange via northbound entrance ramp and at-grade intersection; former incomplete full interchange with southbound exit; northern end of freeway
Delaware	Marlboro Township	124.39	200.19		SR 229 – Norton, Ashley	
Marion	Waldo	126.35	203.34	126	SR 98 – Waldo, Bucyrus	Interchange; access to SR 47 and SR 423
Marion	Richland–Pleasant township line				Newmans-Cardington Road	At-grade intersection; southern end of freeway
Marion	Marion Township	134.56	216.55	134	SR 95 – Marion, Mount Gilead	
Marion	Marion Township	135.57	218.18	135	SR 309 – Marion, Galion	
Marion	Marion Township	137.14	220.71	137	Marion-Williamsport Road	
Marion	Grand Prairie Township				Linn Hipsher Road (CR 195)	At-grade intersection; northern end of freeway
Marion	Grand Prairie Township	140.64	226.34	140	SR 4 – Bucyrus	Interchange
Marion	Grand Prairie Township	143.52	230.97	143	SR 231 – Morral, Nevada	Interchange
Wyandot	Pitt Township	148.00	238.18		SR 294 – Harpster	
Wyandot	Pitt Township	151.68	244.11	—	SR 199	Southern end of freeway; southern terminus of SR 199
Wyandot	Crane Township	153.81– 153.86	247.53– 247.61	—	US 30 east – Bucyrus, Mansfield	Southern end of US 30 concurrency
Wyandot	Upper Sandusky	155.48	250.22	—	CR 330 (E. Wyandot Avenue) – Upper Sandusky	Northern end of freeway; Lincoln Highway
Wyandot	Upper Sandusky	158.17	254.55	—	SR 53 / SR 67 – Upper Sandusky, Tiffin	Southern end of freeway
Wyandot	Upper Sandusky	159.42	256.56	—	SR 199 – Upper Sandusky	
Wyandot	Salem Township	159.82– 160.54	257.21– 258.36	—	US 30 west – Van Wert	Northern end of US 30 concurrency; left exit and entrance northbound
Wyandot	Salem Township	161.599	260.068		CR 44	At-grade intersection; northern end of freeway; scheduled to become a pair of RIROs April 2022
Wyandot	Crawford Township	167.353– 167.62	269.329– 269.76		SR 15 west to I-75 – Findlay, Toledo SR 103 west	Interchange; eastern terminus of SR 15; southern end of SR 103 concurrency
Wyandot	Carey	168.82	271.69		SR 103 east / SR 199 south (E. Findlay Street) / SR 568 west (W. Findlay Street)	Northern end of SR 103 concurrency; southern end of SR 199 concurrency
Seneca	Loudon Township	178.20	286.79		US 224 – Findlay, Tiffin	
Seneca	Fostoria	182.99– 183.00	294.49– 294.51		SR 18 east	Southern end of SR 18 concurrency
Seneca	Fostoria	183.51	295.33		SR 12 west	Southern end of SR 12 concurrency
Seneca	Fostoria	183.81	295.81		SR 12 east	Northern end of SR 12 concurrency
Seneca–Hancock county line	Fostoria	184.33	296.65		SR 18 (North Street) / SR 613 west	Northern end of SR 18 concurrency; eastern terminus of SR 613
Seneca–Wood county line	Fostoria	185.26	298.15		SR 199 north	Northern end of SR 199 concurrency
Wood–Sandusky county line	Montgomery–Freedom– Madison–Scott township quadripoint	196.95	316.96		US 6 – Bowling Green, Fremont	
Wood–Sandusky county line	Freedom–Madison township line	199.95	321.79		SR 600 east – Gibsonburg	Western terminus of SR 600
Wood–Sandusky county line	Freedom–Madison township line	202.81	326.39		SR 105 – Woodville, Pemberville	Roundabout
Wood–Sandusky county line	Troy–Woodville township line	204.40	328.95		SR 582 east	Southern end of SR 582 concurrency
Wood–Sandusky county line	Troy–Woodville township line	204.44	329.01		SR 582 west	Northern end of SR 582 concurrency
Wood–Sandusky county line	Troy–Woodville township line	205.95	331.44		US 20 east – Woodville, Fremont	Southern end of US 20 concurrency
Wood	Troy Township	208.25– 208.82	335.15– 336.06	81	Pemberville Road / SR 420 north to I-280 – Toledo	Exit number follows US 20; to Ohio Turnpike (I-80/I-90); signed as exits 81A (SR 420) and 81B (Pemberville Road); Southern terminus of SR 420
Wood	Lemoyne				Lemoyne Road	Interchange via connector roads
Wood	Stony Ridge	211.10	339.73		SR 163 east	Western terminus of SR 163
Wood	Perrysburg	217.18	349.52		I-75 north / US 20 west – Toledo, Perrysburg	Northern end of US 20 concurrency; eastern end of I-75 concurrency; southern end of freeway section; I-75 exit 193
Wood	Perrysburg	219.03– 219.40	352.49– 353.09	1A	I-75 south / I-475 begins – Dayton	Western end of I-75 concurrency; southern end of I-475 concurrency; exit numbers follow I-475; I-75 exit 192
Wood	Perrysburg	219.03– 219.40	352.49– 353.09	2	SR 25 – Bowling Green, Perrysburg	
Lucas	Maumee	222.74	358.47	4	US 24 (Anthony Wayne Trail) – Napoleon, Maumee	
Lucas	Maumee	224.37	361.09	5	US 20A (Illinois Avenue / Dana Drive)	New diverging diamond interchange opened on August 4, 2025
Lucas	Monclova Township	224.72	361.65	6	To I-80 / I-90 / Ohio Turnpike / Salisbury Road / Dussel Drive	Salisbury Road runs west, Dussel Drive runs east; opened 1989
Lucas	Springfield Township	226.89	365.14	8	SR 2 (Airport Highway) – Toledo Express Airport, Swanton, Toledo	Signed as exits 8A (east) and 8B (west) southbound
Lucas	Springfield Township	229.95	370.07	11	SR 246 east (Dorr Street)	Western terminus of SR 246; added 2021
Lucas	Sylvania Township	231.81	373.06	13	US 20 / SR 120 (Central Avenue)	
Lucas	Sylvania Township	231.98	373.34	232	I-475 east – Toledo	Northern end of I-475 concurrency; exit numbers follow US 23; left exit southbound; I-475 exit 14
Lucas	Sylvania	234.18	376.88	234	US 223 north / SR 51 – Sylvania	Southern end of US 223 concurrency; northern terminus of SR 51; to SR 184
Lucas	Sylvania	234.83	377.92		US 23 north / US 223 north – Ann Arbor	Continuation into Michigan
1.000 mi = 1.609 km; 1.000 km = 0.621 mi: Concurrency terminus; Incomplete access; Unopened

U.S. Route 23
Previous state: Kentucky	Ohio	Next state: Michigan
