= Ohio State Route 25 =

North-south state highway in Ohio, US

State Route 25

Route information
- Maintained by ODOT
- Length: 34.98 mi (56.29 km)
- Existed: 1973–present

Major junctions
- South end: I-75 near Cygnet
- US 6 near Bowling Green; I-75 / I-475 / US 23 in Perrysburg; US 20 in Maumee; US 24 in Toledo; I-75 in Toledo
- North end: I-280 in Toledo

Location
- Country: United States
- State: Ohio
- Counties: Wood, Lucas

Highway system
- Ohio State Highway System; Interstate; US; State; Scenic
← US 25	→ SR 26

State Route 25 (SR 25) is an Ohio state route that runs between Cygnet and Toledo in the US state of Ohio. The highway has a total length of 34.98 miles (56.29 km). Some of the highway is listed on the National Highway System and various sections are rural four-lane highways and urbanized four-lane divided highways. SR 25 passes through farmland, commercial and residential properties.

Between Cygnet and Perrysburg, it is the relic of an old U.S. Route 25 (US 25) that passes through Bowling Green as largely a divided surface highway. From Perrysburg it crosses the Fort Meigs Memorial (Maumee–Perrysburg) Bridge running concurrently with US 20 and then follows the Anthony Wayne Trail from Maumee into downtown Toledo. The Maumee portion runs concurrently with US 24, while US 24 in greater Toledo takes, as far south as Perrysburg, the path of what used to be US 25, more distant from the newer Interstate 75 (I-75), having had its route switched with that of old US 25. North of this former terminus, SR 25 runs through downtown Toledo on Erie Street (northbound) and Michigan Street (southbound) before becoming the Greenbelt Parkway, which is cut off at I-280, terminating the route.

== Route description ==
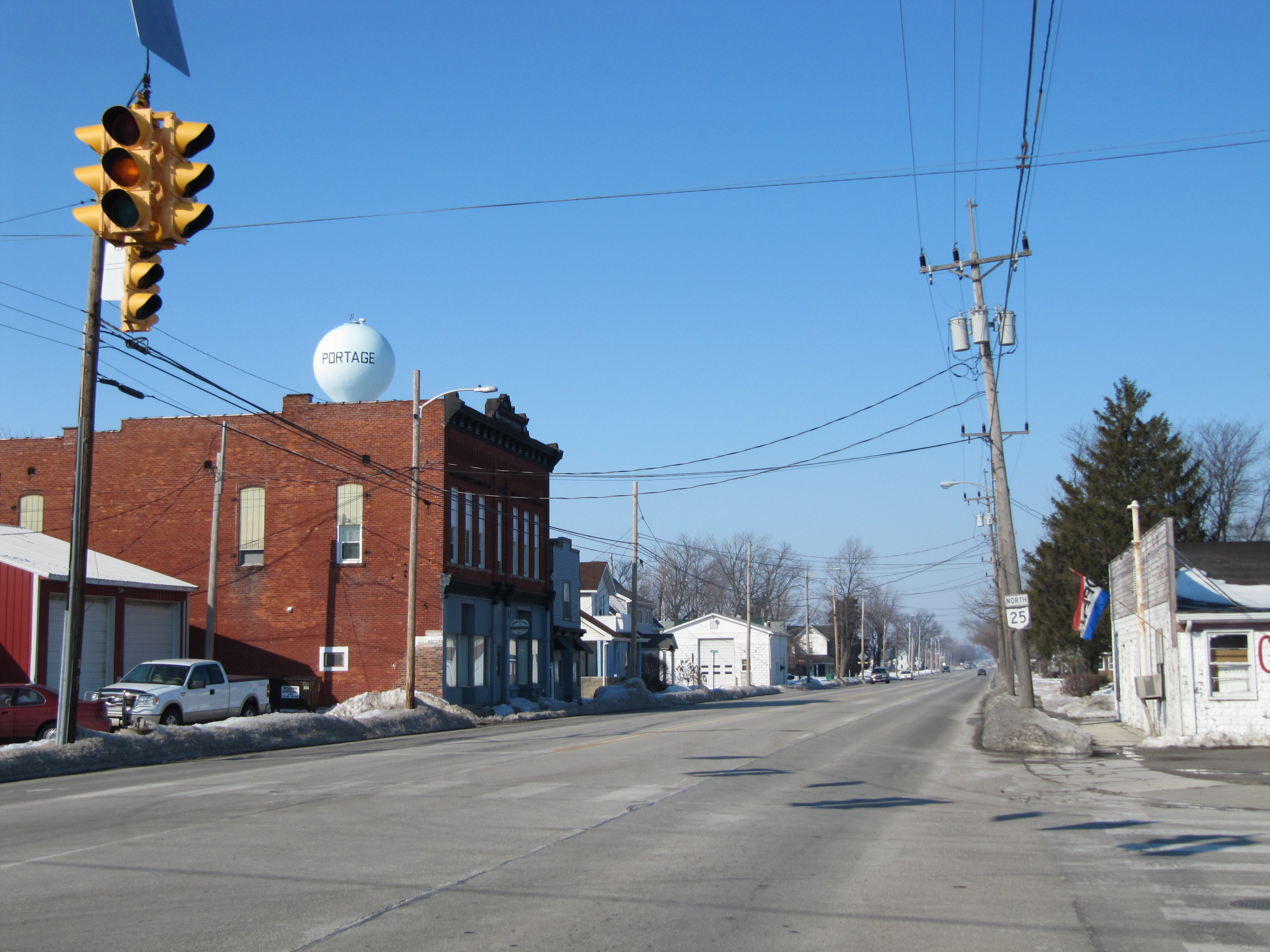
Ohio State Route 25 in Portage

SR 25 heads westerly from its southern terminus at an interchange with I–75 in rural Wood County. The highway heads westward, before turning north at an intersection with Cygnet Road (Township Highway 3). The highway heads northeast passing through farmland as a two-lane highway closely paralleling I–75. The route turns due north and becomes a four-lane divided highway, still closely paralleling I–75, before I–75 heads northeasterly. The road has an intersection with SR 281 and then begins to enter residential properties. The highway enters Bowling Green at an interchange with US 6 and passes through commercial properties.

At a traffic signal with Gypsy Lane Road, the highway becomes a four-lane highway with a center left-turn lane until a traffic signal at Napoleon Road when the roadway loses the left turn lane. North of Napoleon Road the highway passes through residential properties, until the road enters downtown Bowling Green as Main Street. The highway passes through the downtown business district of Bowling Green and an intersection with SR 64 (Wooster Street). The road leaves downtown Bowling Green and returns to passing through residential properties. At Poe Road, SR 25 passes through commercial properties before leaving Bowling Green and becoming Dixie Highway. North of Bowling Green, the route passes through rural farmland as a rural four-lane undivided highway. The highway has a traffic signal at SR 582 (Middleton Pike) and becomes a four-lane divided highway heading northeast passing through farmland with some houses.

SR 25 enters Perrysburg passing through commercial properties and has an interchange with Interstate 475 (I–475) and US 23. At Findlay Street, the highway curves northeasterly and becomes a four-lane undivided highway (West Boundary Street), passing through commercial and residential properties. The road crosses over a set of railroad tracks, before an intersection with SR 65 (West River Road). SR 65 heads northwest concurrently with SR 25, and the concurrency has an intersection with US 20 (West Front Street). At the intersection with US 20, SR 65 turns east onto US 20 and SR 25 turns northwest onto US 20 (Maumee–Western Reserve Road). The concurrency heads northwestward as a four-lane undivided highway passing through woodland and crossing over the Maumee River. SR 25/SR 65 enters Maumee as Conant Street and has an intersection with US 24 (Anthony Wayne Trail). At this intersection, SR 25 turns northeasterly, concurrent with US 24.

US 24/SR 25 heads northeasterly as a four-lane divided highway passing through mostly residential properties. The highway has a bridge over the Ohio Turnpike. On that bridge is an intersection with Detroit Avenue. US 24 leaves SR 25 and heads north-northeast on Detroit. North of the turnpike, the highway enters Toledo and passes through woodland, with some houses and Toledo Country Club, before returning to residential properties. At Harvard Boulevard and Woodsdale Avenue, the route passes through the Toledo Zoo and under a set of railroad tracks. Northeast of the tracks, the road enters a wooded area with some commercial properties. SR 25 has an incomplete interchange with Collingwood Boulevard—the interchange is a northbound exit and southbound entrance on SR 25. This interchange allows northbound SR 25 to have access to southbound I–75 and northbound I–75 access to southbound SR 25. The highway has an interchange with I–75—this interchange is also incomplete allowing only southbound to southbound or northbound to northbound movements.

SR 25 enters downtown Toledo and the highway follows one-way streets: northbound on Erie Street and southbound on Michigan Street. The two streets are two blocks apart and the Lucas County Court House is between them. At the northeastern corner of the Court House, northbound SR 25 turns northwest on Cherry Street and joins SR 120. After a couple blocks, Cherry Street meets southbound SR 25 at Spielbusch Avenue. After a turn to the northeast, the route becomes a four-lane divided highway known as Greenbelt Parkway. Northeast of SR 120 the highway passes through woodland and industrial properties. The northern terminus of SR 25 is at an interchange with I–280, as the roadway continues northeast. The parkway ends northeast of the interchange at Galena Street in a wooded area near the Toledo Correctional Institute.

The portion of SR 25 running from the I-475/US 23 diamond interchange in Perrysburg to the I-75 interchange near downtown Toledo is included within the National Highway System. A 2009 traffic report from the Ohio Department of Transportation (ODOT) showed that the lowest traffic levels were the 5,287 vehicles used the highway daily on the section near its southern terminus, between I–75 and SR 281 in Wood County, while peak traffic volumes were 61,648 vehicles along a section of SR 25 between SR 120 and I–280.

== History ==
Most of the route was at one time the Dixie Highway.

In 1923, the route that later became SR 25 was signed as SR 6. The SR 6 designation was changed to US 25 on November 11, 1926. Between 1946 and 1948, the roadway was widened to a four-lane divided highway, between Bowling Green and Maumee; the section south of Bowling Green was widened to a four-lane divided highway between 1951 and 1953. US 25 was decommissioned in 1973, and SR 25 was signed along its northern section. In 1986, SR 25 and US 24 switched routes north of the intersection at Detroit Avenue. Between 1997 and 1999, the road from the second interchange with I–75 and I–280 was widened into a four-lane divided highway.

In 2004, a 5-mile (8.0 km) stretch of SR 25 in Wood County won a Perpetual Pavement Award from the Asphalt Pavement Association. The section was originally constructed in between 1937 and 1940 as one of the first "deep-strength" asphalt pavements built in Ohio.

== Major intersections ==
County	Location	mi	km	Destinations	Notes
Wood	Henry Township	0.00– 0.70	0.00– 1.13	I-75 / Cygnet Road – Toledo, Dayton, Cygnet	Southern terminus at exit 171 on I-75
Wood	Liberty–Portage township line	3.77	6.07	SR 281 – Defiance, Wayne	
Wood	Bowling Green	8.27– 8.38	13.31– 13.49	US 6 – Fremont, Napoleon	Exit 65 on US 6
Wood	Bowling Green	10.12	16.29	SR 64 (Wooster Street)	
Wood	Middleton Township	15.89	25.57	SR 582 (Middleton Pike) – Haskins, Luckey	
Wood	Perrysburg	20.97– 21.15	33.75– 34.04	I-475 / US 23 to I-75 – Toledo, Dayton, Ann Arbor	Exit 1C on I-475/US 23; diverging diamond interchange
Wood	Perrysburg	22.52	36.24	SR 65 south (Indiana Avenue)	Southern end of SR 65 concurrency
Wood	Perrysburg	22.78	36.66	US 20 east (Front Street) / SR 65 north	Northern end of SR 65 concurrency; southern end of US 20 concurrency
Lucas	Maumee	23.84	38.37	US 20 west / US 24 west (Anthony Wayne Trail / Conant Street)	Northern end of US 20 concurrency; southwestern end of US 24 concurrency
Lucas	Maumee	26.21	42.18	US 24 east (Detroit Avenue)	Northeastern end of US 24 concurrency
Lucas	Toledo	30.80	49.57	SR 2 (Western Avenue)	
Lucas	Toledo	31.43	50.58	Collingwood Avenue to I-75 south	Interchange; northbound exit and southbound entrance only
Lucas	Toledo	31.67– 31.94	50.97– 51.40	I-75 – Detroit, Dayton	Exit 201 on I-75; northbound-to-northbound and southbound-to-southbound movements from both routes only
Lucas	Toledo	32.28	51.95	Washington Street	Unsigned SR 51D
Lucas	Toledo	32.39	52.13	SR 51 (Monroe Street)	
Lucas	Toledo	33.04– 33.25	53.17– 53.51	SR 120 (Cherry Street)	Northbound SR 25 follows SR 120 for 0.21 miles (0.34 km)
Lucas	Toledo	34.54– 34.98	55.59– 56.29	I-280 / LECT / Greenbelt Parkway – Cleveland, Detroit	Northern terminus at exit 11 on I-280
1.000 mi = 1.609 km; 1.000 km = 0.621 mi: Concurrency terminus
