= Otsego High School =

Location
- 18505 Tontogany Creek Road; Tontogany, Ohio 43565
- Coordinates: 41°25′20″N 83°44′42″W

Information
- School type: Public, secondary school
- School district: Otsego Local School District
- Principal: Kevin O'Shea
- Grades: 9–12
- Enrollment: 493 (2023–2024)
- Language: English
- Campus: Rural
- Colors: Orange, black and white
- Mascot: Knights
- Communities served: Grand Rapids, Haskins, Tontogany, Weston
- Distinctions: Ohio Dept. of Education Excellent rating- 2003, 2004, 2005, 2006, 2007
- Athletic conference: Northern Buckeye Conference
- Website: www.otsegoknights.org

Otsego High School is a high school in the village of Tontogany, Ohio, United States. Students are from the general region of Weston, Grand Rapids, Middleton and Washington Townships and the Villages of Weston, Grand Rapids, Tontogany and Haskins. Though the student body is quite small, there are many open enrollment students.

== Facilities ==
In 2004 the Otsego Local School District entered into a partnership with the Ohio School Facilities Commission. This partnership, as well as a bond issue passed by voters, allowed the district to construct a state-of-the-art high school. Construction of this building was completed on January 3, 2007. As part of the partnership, the district will also be constructing two new elementary schools to replace buildings in Haskins and Weston, Ohio, as well as remodeling the existing elementary building in Grand Rapids, Ohio. Demolition of the former junior high school building, which recently moved to the campus in Tontogany, commenced in early July 2008. In 2009 the State of Ohio notified the Otsego Board of Education that the district did not have sufficient numbers of elementary students to justify building two schools. Consequently, the Board opted to build a single school in Tontogany in December 2009. Ground breaking for the new school was held in August 2010.

== Notable alumni ==
- Edward C. Byers, Jr., Navy SEAL, Medal of Honor recipient

== Athletics ==
Otsego High School is a member of the Northern Buckeye Conference after being charter members of the Suburban Lakes League from 1972–2011.

=== Suburban Lakes League Championships ===
- Boys Track & Field – 2000
- Boys Football – 1981, 1985, 1988, 1990, 1992, 1993, 2000, 2005
- Boys Basketball – 2000, 2001
- Boys Baseball – 2006, 2012, 2013
- Girls Volleyball – 2008, 2009

=== Northern Buckeye Conference Championships ===
- Boys Football – 2020
- Boys Cross Country - 2013, 2014, 2015, 2016, 2017, 2019
- Boys Basketball - 2013
- Boys Baseball - 2013
- Girls Cross Country - 2016
- Girls Basketball - 2015, 2017
- Girls Volleyball - 2013, 2014, 2015 (shared with Eastwood)
- Girls Golf - 2012, 2014, 2017, 2018, 2019
- Girls Softball - 2021

=== Ohio High School Athletic Association State Championships ===
- Girls Volleyball – 1992
- Boys Basketball – 1951*

*Title won by Grand Rapids High School prior to consolidation into Otsego H.S.
