= Otsego Local School District =

School district in Ohio, United States

Address
- 18505 Tontogany Creek Road Suite 1 Bowling Green, Ohio, 43402; United States
- Coordinates: 41°25′11″N 83°44′24″W

District information
- Type: Public
- Motto: "Educational Excellence for the Twenty-First Century"
- Grades: PK–12
- Schools: 3
- NCES District ID: 3905072

Students and staff
- Students: 1,637 (2024–2025)
- Teachers: 84.74 (on an FTE basis) (2024–2025)
- Staff: 165.28 (on an FTE basis) (2024–2025)
- Student–teacher ratio: 19.32 (2024–2025)

Other information
- Website: www.otsegoknights.org

Otsego Local School District is a school district in Northwest Ohio. The school district serves students who live in the Wood County villages of Tontogany, Haskins, Grand Rapids, and Weston, Ohio; all or parts of the townships of Grand Rapids, Middleton, Milton, Washington, and Weston; and a small portion of Lucas County in Providence Township. The superintendent is Adam Koch.

== Schools ==
=== Grades 9-12 ===
- Otsego High School

=== Grades 6-8 ===
- Otsego Junior High School

=== Grades Pre-K-5 ===
- Otsego Elementary School
