= New Rochester, Ohio =

New Rochester, Ohio may refer to:

- New Rochester, Paulding County, Ohio, an unincorporated community in Paulding County
- New Rochester, Wood County, Ohio, an unincorporated community in Wood County
