= Bloom Center, Ohio =

Bloom Center may refer to:

- Bloom Center, Logan County, Ohio
- Bloom Center, Wood County, Ohio
