= Mungen (disambiguation) =

Mungen, Ohio is an unincorporated community in Ohio (USA).

Mungen may also refer to:

- William Mungen (1821–1887), nineteenth-century American politician, lawyer, teacher, editor and publisher from Ohio
- Mungen River, near Bloody Point, South Carolina
