= Denver, Ohio =

Denver, Ohio may refer to:

- Denver, Ross County, Ohio, an unincorporated community
- Denver, Wood County, Ohio, an unincorporated community
