= Tontogany (YTB-821) =

Tugboat of the United States Navy

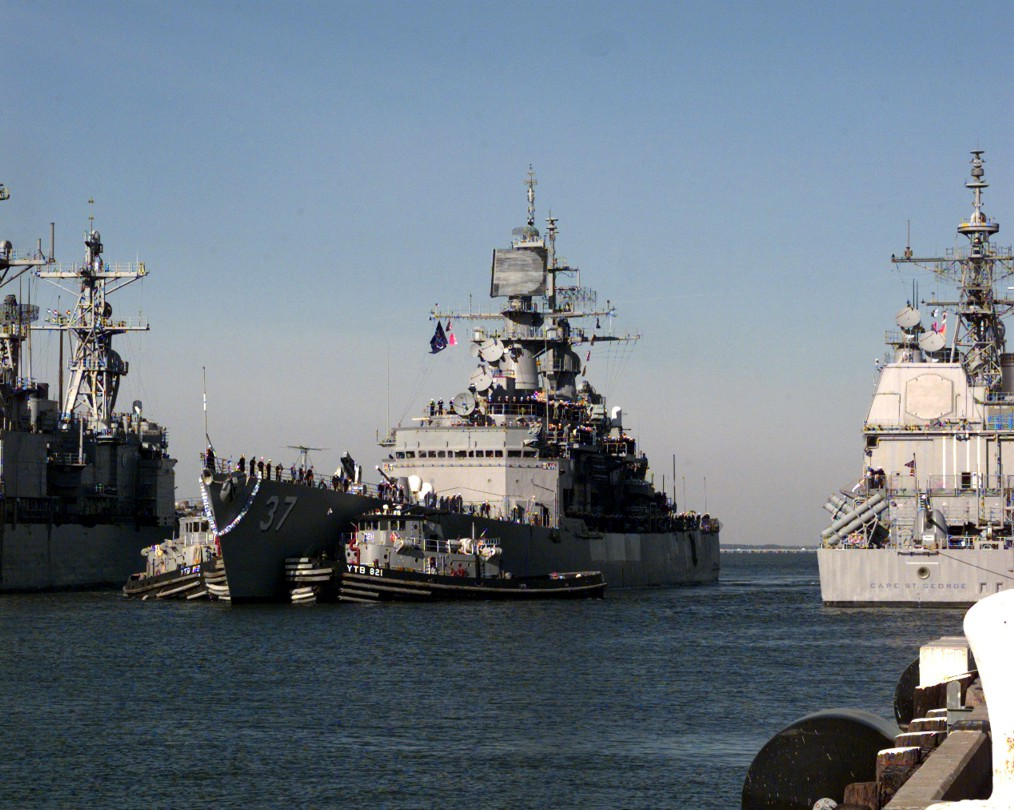
- Tontogany (YTB-821) with USS South Carolina (CGN-37)

History

United States
- Awarded: 9 August 1971
- Builder: Marinette Marine, Marinette, Wisconsin
- Laid down: 4 December 1972
- Launched: 16 May 1973
- Acquired: 28 July 1973
- In service: July 1973
- Stricken: 13 March 2001
- Identification: IMO number: 8980933; MMSI number: 367128950; Callsign: WDD3325
- Fate: Sold into commercial service, 20 November 2001

General characteristics
- Class & type: Natick-class large harbor tug
- Displacement: 286 long tons (291 t) (light); 346 long tons (352 t) (full)
- Length: 108 ft (33 m)
- Beam: 31 ft (9.4 m)
- Draft: 14 ft (4.3 m)
- Speed: 12 knots (14 mph; 22 km/h)
- Complement: 12
- Armament: None

Tontogany (YTB-821) was a United States Navy Natick-class large harbor tug named for Tontogany, Ohio.

== Construction ==
The contract for Tontogany was awarded 9 August 1971. She was laid down on 4 December 1972 at Marinette, Wisconsin, by Marinette Marine and launched 16 May 1973.

== Operational history ==
Delivered to the Navy on 28 July 1973, Tontogany was attached to the 5th Naval District and operated at Norfolk, Va., where she provided tug and towing services, waterfront fire protection, and pilot assistance. Late in 1977, she was shifted to the 6th Naval District, Charleston, SC, where she served into October 1979.

Stricken from the Navy List 13 March 2001, ex-Tontogany was sold by Defense Reutilization and Marketing Service (DRMS) 20 November 2001. Acquired by McAllister Towing and Transportation, she was renamed Dorothy McAllister.
