= Hirzel Canning Company & Farms =

Food products company founded in 1923 by Carl R. Hirzel in Ohio, US

- Industry: Food Processing
- Founded: 1923; 103 years
- Founder: Carl R. Hirzel
- Headquarters: 411 Lemoyne Rd, Northwood, OH 43619
- Area served: United States
- Key people: Steve Hirzel, CEO
- Products: Canned Tomatoes, Tomato Juice, Tomato & Pasta Sauces, Salsa, and Sauerkraut
- Brands: Dei Fratelli Brand Tomatoes - Silver Fleece Brand Sauerkraut - Star Cross

Hirzel Canning Company & Farms is an American food products company that owns Dei Fratelli Brand Tomatoes and Silver Fleece Brand Sauerkraut. It is headquartered in Northwood, Ohio.

Hirzel Company was founded in 1923 by Carl R. Hirzel. The Hirzel family runs the company with the 4th generation currently in leadership roles.

== History ==
Carl R. Hirzel was a Swiss emigrant who came to New York with his wife Lena to become brewers. They later moved near Toledo, Ohio to be closer to his brothers.

With the start of American Prohibition in 1920. Hirzel could not longer produce beer. He instead purchased what would be called Hirzel Farms and began growing and selling cabbage. A plentiful cabbage harvest in 1923 convinced Hirtzel to begin producing Sauerkraut, a process very similar to beer making. He started selling his sauerkraut under the name Star Cross. In 1912, Hirzel's sauerkraut customers started requesting that he grow Tomatoes. In 1924, Hirzel Farms harvested their first tomato crop.

In 1947, the Hirzel Canning Company was incorporated with Karl A. Hirzel, the son of Carl R. Hirzel, as president and his wife Rosalie as secretary. In 1954, the Hirzel Company purchased a plant in Pemberville, Ohio. In 1982 the company expanded to a third plant in Ottawa, Ohio.

Today, Hirzel Canning Company focuses on their Dei Fratelli Brand founded in 1980 and their Silver Fleece Sauerkraut products. Most of the tomatoes Dei Fratelli uses in their products, are grown in Northwest Ohio and Southeast Michigan.

== Hirzel Canning Company Facilities ==
Packaging Capabilities Hirzel Canning Company caters to multiple customers including industrial, institutional, food service, and retail. This variety of customers requires Hirzel Canning Company to package their products in a variety of ways. Today Hirzel Canning Company packages their products in retail cans, foodservice cans, and industrial drums and totes. For many of their larger customers Hirzel Canning Company utilizes reusable transport packaging to reduce costs for customers as well as improve sustainability in industrial packaging.

Stephen A. Hirzel, son of Karl A. Hirzel Jr., is currently President of Hirzel Canning.

== Hirzel Farms ==
Lou Kozma Jr. is general manager of Hirzel Farms which follows a sustainability model that is based on environmental and social responsibilities.
