= Six Points =

Six Points may refer to:

== Canada ==
- Islington-Six Points, an area of the former city of Etobicoke, Ontario, now part of Toronto, Canada

== United States ==
- Six Points, Hendricks County, Indiana
- Six Points, Ohio
- Six Points Texas, an outdoor Western set on the backlot of Universal Studios Hollywood

== See also ==
- Six point movement, political movement in East Pakistan
- Six-Point Formula of 1973 (Telangana), Indian government policy for Telangana
- Six-pointed star
