= Trombley =

Trombley is a surname. Notable people with the surname include:

- Laura Skandera Trombley (21st century), fifth president of Pitzer College
- Mike Trombley (born 1967), American baseball player
- Rosalie Trombley (1939–2021), Canadian music director
- Stephen Trombley (born 1954), American author, musician, and filmmaker

== See also ==
- Trombley, Ohio
