= Hull Prairie, Ohio =

Unincorporated community in Ohio, US

Coordinates: 41°28′25″N 83°41′49″W

Hull Prairie is an unincorporated community in Wood County, in the U.S. state of Ohio.

== History ==
Hull Prairie was platted in 1861, and named for David Hull, the original owner of the town site. A post office called Hull Prairie was established in 1862, and remained in operation until 1905.
