= Hatton, Ohio =

Unincorporated community in Ohio, U.S.

Coordinates: 41°15′03″N 83°28′07″W

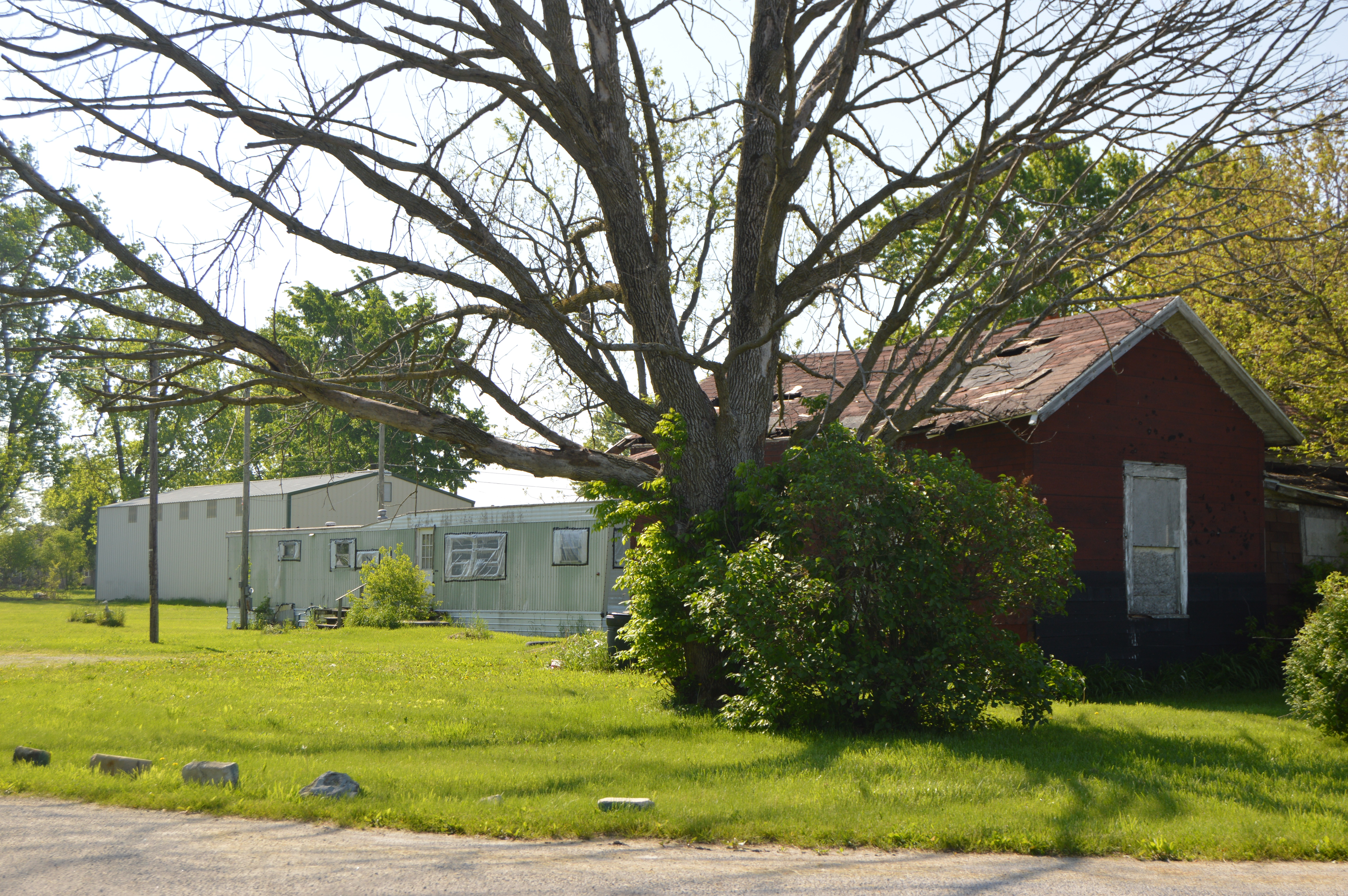
Scene off Second Street

Hatton is an unincorporated community in Wood County, in the U.S. state of Ohio.

== History ==
Hatton was originally called East Millgrove Station, and under the latter name was platted in 1880. A post office called Hatton was established in 1882, and remained in operation until 1922.
