= Mermill, Ohio =

Unincorporated community in Ohio, U.S.

Coordinates: 41°17′51″N 83°38′45″W

Mermill is an unincorporated community in Wood County, in the U.S. state of Ohio.

== History ==
A post office called Mermill was established in 1884, and remained in operation until 1954. Besides the post office, Mermill had a stave factory.
