= Bays, Ohio =

Unincorporated community in Ohio, U.S.

- Unincorporated community
- Location within the state of Ohio Bays (the United States)
- Coordinates: 41°16′8″N 83°40′11″W
- Country: United States
- State: Ohio
- County: Wood
- Elevation: 686 ft (209 m)
- Time zone: UTC-5 (Eastern (EST))
  - Summer (DST): UTC-4 (EDT)
- ZIP codes: 43462
- Area codes: 419, 567
- GNIS feature ID: 1064394

Bays is an unincorporated community in Wood County, in the U.S. state of Ohio.

== History ==
Bays was platted in 1890. A post office was established at Bays in 1890, and remained in operation until 1915.
