= Lime City, Ohio =

- Unincorporated community
- Location within Ohio Location within the United States
- Coordinates: 41°32′06″N 83°34′01″W
- Country: United States
- State: Ohio
- County: Wood
- Elevation: 646 ft (197 m)
- Time zone: UTC-5 (Eastern (EST))
  - Summer (DST): UTC-4 (EDT)
- Postal code: 43551
- Area codes: 419 and 567
- GNIS feature ID: 1064997

Lime City is an unincorporated community in Wood County, Ohio, United States. It is part of Perrysburg Township and located at the intersection of Lime City Road and U.S. Route 20 (Fremont Pike). Lacking a post office, Lime City's zip code falls within Perrysburg's 43551.

== History ==
Lime City was platted in 1887, and named for the local lime industry. A post office was in operation at Lime City between 1874 and 1953.

== Education ==
Lime City is part of the Rossford Exempted Village School District and used to have Lime City Elementary as part of the district. Lime City Elementary was a "sister" school to Glenwood Elementary, which is where students from the area currently attend grades Pre-K through 2nd grade.

The last Post Master (mistress) was Marion Veronica Harrison (maiden name Rectenwald) she was relived in 1953.

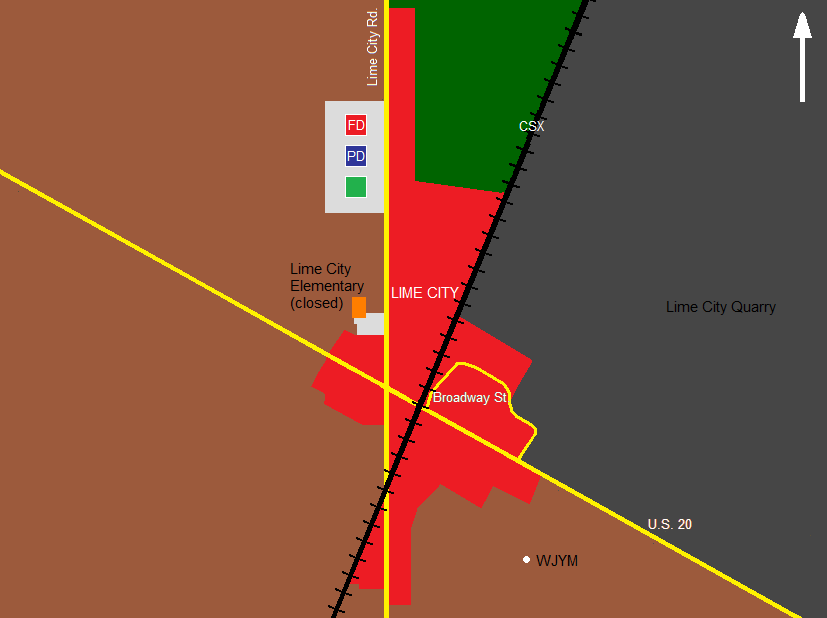
General vicinity of Lime City, Ohio
