= Stony Ridge, Ohio =

- CDP
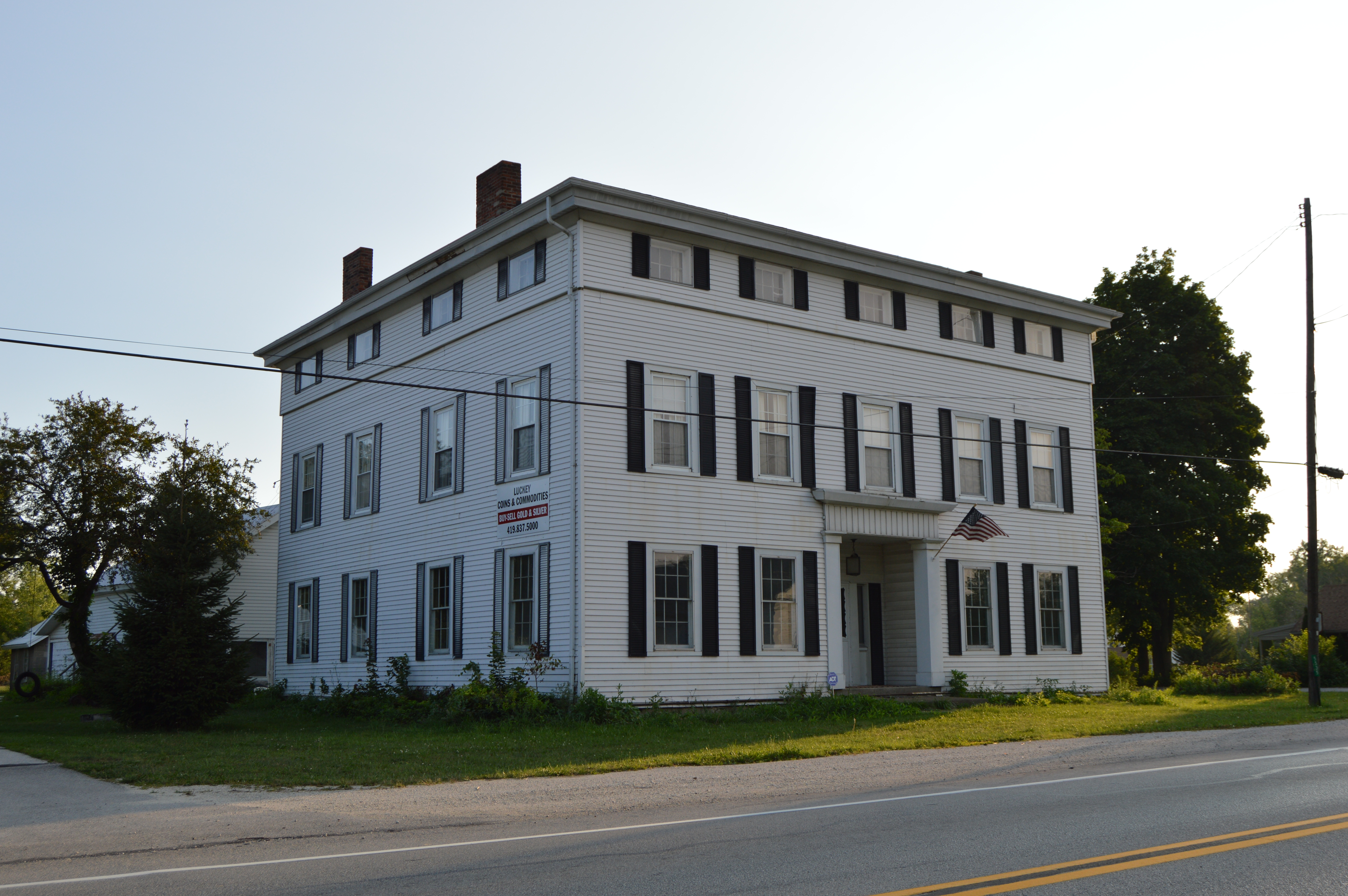
- The Empire House

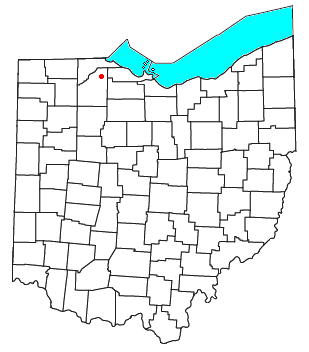
- Location of Stony Ridge, Ohio
- Coordinates: 41°30′15″N 83°30′20″W
- Country: United States
- State: Ohio
- County: Wood

Area
  - Total: 1.70 sq mi (4.41 km^{2})
  - Land: 1.70 sq mi (4.41 km^{2})
  - Water: 0 sq mi (0.00 km^{2})
- Elevation: 646 ft (197 m)

Population (2020)
  - Total: 434
  - Density: 254.7/sq mi (98.35/km^{2})
- Time zone: UTC-5 (Eastern (EST))
  - Summer (DST): UTC-4 (EDT)
- ZIP code: 43463
- Area code: 419
- FIPS code: 39-74846
- GNIS feature ID: 2628974

Stony Ridge is a census-designated place (CDP) in northwestern Troy Township, Wood County, Ohio, United States. As of the 2020 census, it had a population of 434. It has a post office with the ZIP code 43463.

== History ==
Stony Ridge was platted in 1872, and named for the stony terrain of the original town site. A post office called Stony Ridge has been in operation since 1837.

== Geography ==
It is located along the concurrent U.S. Routes 20 and 23, at Stony Ridge Road and East Broadway. It contains a branch of the Pemberville Public Library, a community park, Stony Ridge United Methodist Church, and St. John's Lutheran Church.

According to the U.S. Census Bureau, the CDP has an area of 1.7 square miles (4.4 km^{2}), all land.

== Demographics ==
Historical population
Census	Pop.	Note	%±
2020	434		—
U.S. Decennial Census
