= Wood County, Ohio =

County in Ohio, United States

- County
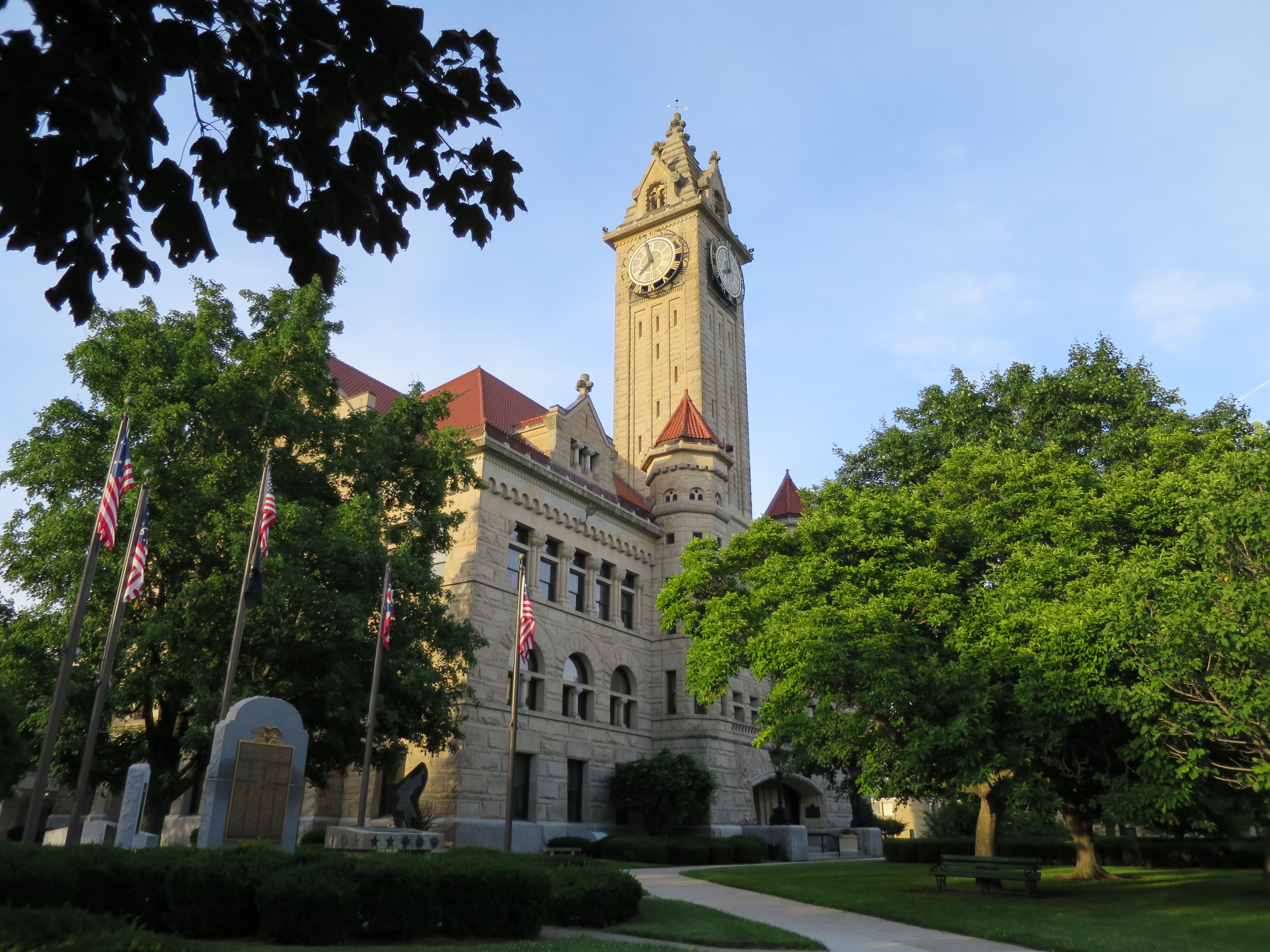
- Wood County Courthouse and Jail in Bowling Green, Ohio

- Flag Seal

- Location within the U.S. state of Ohio
- Coordinates: 41°22′N 83°37′W
- Country: United States
- State: Ohio
- Founded: April 1, 1820
- Named for: Captain Eleazer D. Wood
- Seat: Bowling Green
- Largest city: Bowling Green

Area
  - Total: 620 sq mi (1,600 km^{2})
  - Land: 617 sq mi (1,600 km^{2})
  - Water: 3.3 sq mi (8.5 km^{2}) 0.5%

Population (2020)
  - Estimate (2025): 134,176 ▲
  - Density: 210/sq mi (81/km^{2})
- Time zone: UTC−5 (Eastern)
  - Summer (DST): UTC−4 (EDT)
- Congressional districts: 5th, 9th

Wood County is a county located in the U.S. state of Ohio. As of the 2020 census, the population was 132,248. Its county seat is Bowling Green. The county was named for Captain Eleazer D. Wood, the engineer for General William Henry Harrison's army, who built Fort Meigs during the War of 1812. Wood County is part of the Toledo, OH Metropolitan Statistical Area. Its diagonal northwest border is formed by the Maumee River, which has its mouth at Maumee Bay on Lake Erie.

== History ==
Wood County was established on February 12, 1820, following a treaty and land purchase from local Indian tribes. Perrysburg was the first county seat, and remained the county seat until 1870, when it was moved to Bowling Green.

Wood County established its first health department in 1920.

== Geography ==
According to the U.S. Census Bureau, the county has a total area of 620 square miles (1,600 km^{2}), of which 617 square miles (1,600 km^{2}) is land and 3.3 square miles (8.5 km^{2}) (0.5%) is water.

=== Adjacent counties ===
- Lucas County (north)
- Ottawa County (northeast)
- Sandusky County (east)
- Seneca County (southeast)
- Hancock County (south)
- Putnam County (southwest)
- Henry County (west)

== Demographics ==
Historical population
Census	Pop.	Note	%±
1820	733		—
1830	1,102		50.3%
1840	5,357		386.1%
1850	9,157		70.9%
1860	17,886		95.3%
1870	24,596		37.5%
1880	34,022		38.3%
1890	44,392		30.5%
1900	51,555		16.1%
1910	46,330		−10.1%
1920	44,892		−3.1%
1930	50,320		12.1%
1940	51,796		2.9%
1950	59,605		15.1%
1960	72,596		21.8%
1970	89,722		23.6%
1980	107,372		19.7%
1990	113,269		5.5%
2000	121,065		6.9%
2010	125,488		3.7%
2020	132,248		5.4%
2025 (est.)	134,176	▲	1.5%
U.S. Decennial Census; 1790–1960 1900–1990; 1990–2000 2020

=== 2020 census ===
As of the 2020 census, the county had a population of 132,248. The median age was 36.8 years. 20.6% of residents were under the age of 18 and 16.7% of residents were 65 years of age or older. For every 100 females there were 95.9 males, and for every 100 females age 18 and over there were 93.7 males age 18 and over.

The racial makeup of the county was 87.2% White, 2.4% Black or African American, 0.2% American Indian and Alaska Native, 2.1% Asian, <0.1% Native Hawaiian and Pacific Islander, 1.7% from some other race, and 6.4% from two or more races. Hispanic or Latino residents of any race comprised 6.3% of the population.

69.9% of residents lived in urban areas, while 30.1% lived in rural areas.

There were 53,202 households in the county, of which 26.9% had children under the age of 18 living in them. Of all households, 47.3% were married-couple households, 19.6% were households with a male householder and no spouse or partner present, and 25.6% were households with a female householder and no spouse or partner present. About 30.3% of all households were made up of individuals and 11.5% had someone living alone who was 65 years of age or older.

There were 56,863 housing units, of which 6.4% were vacant. Among occupied housing units, 65.9% were owner-occupied and 34.1% were renter-occupied. The homeowner vacancy rate was 1.3% and the rental vacancy rate was 7.3%.

=== Racial and ethnic composition ===
Wood County, Ohio – Racial and ethnic composition Note: the US Census treats Hispanic/Latino as an ethnic category. This table excludes Latinos from the racial categories and assigns them to a separate category. Hispanics/Latinos may be of any race.
Race / ethnicity (NH = Non-Hispanic)	Pop 1980	Pop 1990	Pop 2000	Pop 2010	Pop 2020	% 1980	% 1990	% 2000	% 2010	% 2020
White alone (NH)	102,886	107,989	112,913	113,021	112,493	95.82%	95.34%	93.27%	90.07%	85.06%
Black or African American alone (NH)	1,295	1,149	1,492	2,906	3,089	1.21%	1.01%	1.23%	2.32%	2.34%
Native American or Alaska Native alone (NH)	111	174	233	232	164	0.10%	0.15%	0.19%	0.18%	0.12%
Asian alone (NH)	537	1,014	1,241	1,924	2,750	0.50%	0.90%	1.03%	1.53%	2.08%
Native Hawaiian or Pacific Islander alone (NH)	x	x	18	30	9	x	x	0.01%	0.02%	0.01%
Other race alone (NH)	214	61	93	104	330	0.20%	0.05%	0.08%	0.08%	0.25%
Mixed race or Multiracial (NH)	x	x	1,042	1,608	5,133	x	x	0.86%	1.28%	3.88%
Hispanic or Latino (any race)	2,329	2,882	4,033	5,663	8,280	2.17%	2.54%	3.33%	4.51%	6.26%
Total	107,372	113,269	121,065	125,488	132,248	100.00%	100.00%	100.00%	100.00%	100.00%

=== 2010 census ===
As of the 2010 United States census, there were 125,488 people, 49,043 households, and 30,923 families living in the county. The population density was 203.3 inhabitants per square mile (78.5 inhabitants/km^{2}). There were 53,376 housing units at an average density of 86.5 units per square mile (33.4 units/km^{2}). The racial makeup of the county was 92.8% white, 2.4% black or African American, 1.5% Asian, 0.2% American Indian, 1.3% from other races, and 1.7% from two or more races. Those of Hispanic or Latino origin made up 4.5% of the population. In terms of ancestry, 40.8% were German, 14.4% were Irish, 10.4% were English, 6.7% were Polish, and 5.2% were American.

Of the 49,043 households, 29.5% had children under the age of 18 living with them, 50.1% were married couples living together, 9.0% had a female householder with no husband present, 36.9% were non-families, and 27.5% of all households were made up of individuals. The average household size was 2.43 and the average family size was 2.98. The median age was 35.3 years.

The median income for a household in the county was $53,298 and the median income for a family was $69,768. Males had a median income of $51,038 versus $35,472 for females. The per capita income for the county was $26,671. About 6.4% of families and 12.2% of the population were below the poverty line, including 10.5% of those under age 18 and 6.3% of those age 65 or over.

=== 2000 census ===
As of the census of 2000, there were 121,065 people, 45,172 households, and 29,678 families living in the county. The population density was 196 people per square mile (76 people/km^{2}). There were 47,468 housing units at an average density of 77 units per square mile (30/km^{2}). The racial makeup of the county was 94.83% White, 1.27% Black or African American, 0.23% Native American, 1.03% Asian, 0.01% Pacific Islander, 1.45% from other races, and 1.18% from two or more races. 3.33% of the population were Hispanic or Latino of any race. 36.3% were of German, 9.9% American, 8.2% English, 8.0% Irish and 5.8% Polish ancestry according to Census 2000.

There were 45,172 households, out of which 32.00% had children under the age of 18 living with them, 53.90% were married couples living together, 8.50% had a female householder with no husband present, and 34.30% were non-families. 25.80% of all households were made up of individuals, and 9.10% had someone living alone who was 65 years of age or older. The average household size was 2.51 and the average family size was 3.04.

In the county, the population was spread out, with 23.70% under the age of 18, 17.20% from 18 to 24, 26.80% from 25 to 44, 21.30% from 45 to 64, and 11.00% who were 65 years of age or older. The median age was 33 years. For every 100 females there were 93.80 males. For every 100 females age 18 and over, there were 91.10 males.

The median income for a household in the county was $44,442, and the median income for a family was $56,468. Males had a median income of $40,419 versus $26,640 for females. The per capita income for the county was $21,284. About 4.70% of families and 9.60% of the population were below the poverty line, including 7.40% of those under age 18 and 5.80% of those age 65 or over.

== Economy ==
According to the 2019 Wood County Comprehensive annual report, the largest employers in the county were:

#	Employer	# of employees
1	Bowling Green State University	3,300
2	Magna	2,200
3	First Solar, Inc	1,200
4	Owens Community College	1,000
5	Waltrust/Walgreen Company	1,000
6	Wood County Hospital	875
7	Wood County	842
8	FedEx Ground	800
9	Fiat Chrysler Automobiles	800
10	Home Depot	750

== Politics ==
Wood County formerly was a Republican stronghold county, but since 1964 the county has become a bellwether county. Wood County voted for Bill Clinton twice, George W. Bush twice, and then Obama twice. In 2016, President Trump won the county decisively, and expanded his vote total in 2020 and 2024. In fact, President Trump's win in 2024 was the largest for any presidential candidate of either party since 1988, and the most votes ever received by any candidate in Wood County.

United States presidential election results for Wood County, Ohio
Year	Republican		Democratic		Third party(ies)	
Year	No.	%	No.	%	No.	%
1856	1,319	55.03%	935	39.01%	143	5.97%
1860	2,011	59.85%	1,330	39.58%	19	0.57%
1864	2,614	63.60%	1,496	36.40%	0	0.00%
1868	2,957	60.99%	1,891	39.01%	0	0.00%
1872	2,994	60.95%	1,896	38.60%	22	0.45%
1876	4,079	55.59%	3,245	44.23%	13	0.18%
1880	4,305	54.16%	3,441	43.29%	203	2.55%
1884	4,549	53.06%	3,753	43.78%	271	3.16%
1888	5,199	51.68%	4,431	44.05%	430	4.27%
1892	5,314	49.10%	4,748	43.87%	760	7.02%
1896	7,290	51.54%	6,653	47.04%	201	1.42%
1900	7,153	54.29%	5,752	43.66%	271	2.06%
1904	7,025	61.50%	3,630	31.78%	767	6.72%
1908	5,904	49.57%	5,625	47.23%	381	3.20%
1912	2,020	20.15%	4,356	43.46%	3,648	36.39%
1916	5,034	45.32%	5,796	52.18%	278	2.50%
1920	12,042	69.72%	4,965	28.75%	265	1.53%
1924	10,665	65.33%	3,291	20.16%	2,369	14.51%
1928	15,409	76.56%	4,612	22.92%	105	0.52%
1932	10,566	47.34%	11,332	50.78%	420	1.88%
1936	11,716	47.28%	11,255	45.42%	1,807	7.29%
1940	16,998	63.64%	9,711	36.36%	0	0.00%
1944	16,016	66.62%	8,025	33.38%	0	0.00%
1948	13,197	57.28%	9,725	42.21%	119	0.52%
1952	17,269	65.32%	9,168	34.68%	0	0.00%
1956	16,844	66.32%	8,553	33.68%	0	0.00%
1960	18,952	64.17%	10,581	35.83%	0	0.00%
1964	12,142	42.68%	16,304	57.32%	0	0.00%
1968	16,111	53.81%	10,867	36.30%	2,961	9.89%
1972	21,080	59.17%	13,494	37.88%	1,051	2.95%
1976	19,331	52.06%	16,926	45.58%	874	2.35%
1980	23,315	55.23%	14,139	33.49%	4,759	11.27%
1984	29,750	64.74%	15,907	34.62%	297	0.65%
1988	26,013	57.89%	18,579	41.35%	341	0.76%
1992	20,579	38.68%	20,754	39.01%	11,870	22.31%
1996	20,518	41.58%	23,183	46.98%	5,642	11.43%
2000	27,504	52.70%	22,687	43.47%	2,003	3.84%
2004	33,592	53.03%	29,401	46.41%	353	0.56%
2008	29,648	45.50%	34,285	52.61%	1,231	1.89%
2012	29,704	46.37%	32,802	51.21%	1,553	2.42%
2016	32,498	50.13%	27,318	42.14%	5,010	7.73%
2020	35,757	52.89%	30,617	45.29%	1,226	1.81%
2024	36,877	54.56%	30,016	44.41%	693	1.03%

== Government ==
=== County officials ===
Office	Name	Party
Commissioner	Doris Herringshaw	Republican
Commissioner	Craig LaHote	Republican
Commissioner	Dr. Theodore Bowlus	Republican
Auditor	Matthew Oestreich	Republican
Clerk of Court of Common Pleas	Douglas F. Cubberley	Republican
Coroner	Douglas W. Hess	Republican
Engineer	John Musteric	Republican
Prosecuting Attorney	Paul A. Dobson	Republican
Recorder	Connor Rose	Republican
Sheriff	Mark Wasylyshyn	Republican
Treasurer	Jane Spoerl	Republican
Judge of the Common Pleas Court	Mary L. Mack	Republican
Judge of the Common Pleas Court	Joel M. Kuhlman	Democrat
Judge of the Common Pleas Court	Matthew Reger	Republican
Judge of the Common Pleas Court (Probate)	David W. Woessner	Republican

== Education ==
School districts include:

- Anthony Wayne Local School District
- Bowling Green City School District
- Eastwood Local School District
- Elmwood Local School District
- Fostoria City School District
- Gibsonburg Exempted Village School District
- Lakota Local School District
- Lake Local School District
- McComb Local School District
- North Baltimore Local School District
- Northwood Local School District
- Otsego Local School District
- Patrick Henry Local School District
- Perrysburg Exempted Village School District
- Rossford Exempted Village School District

== Libraries ==
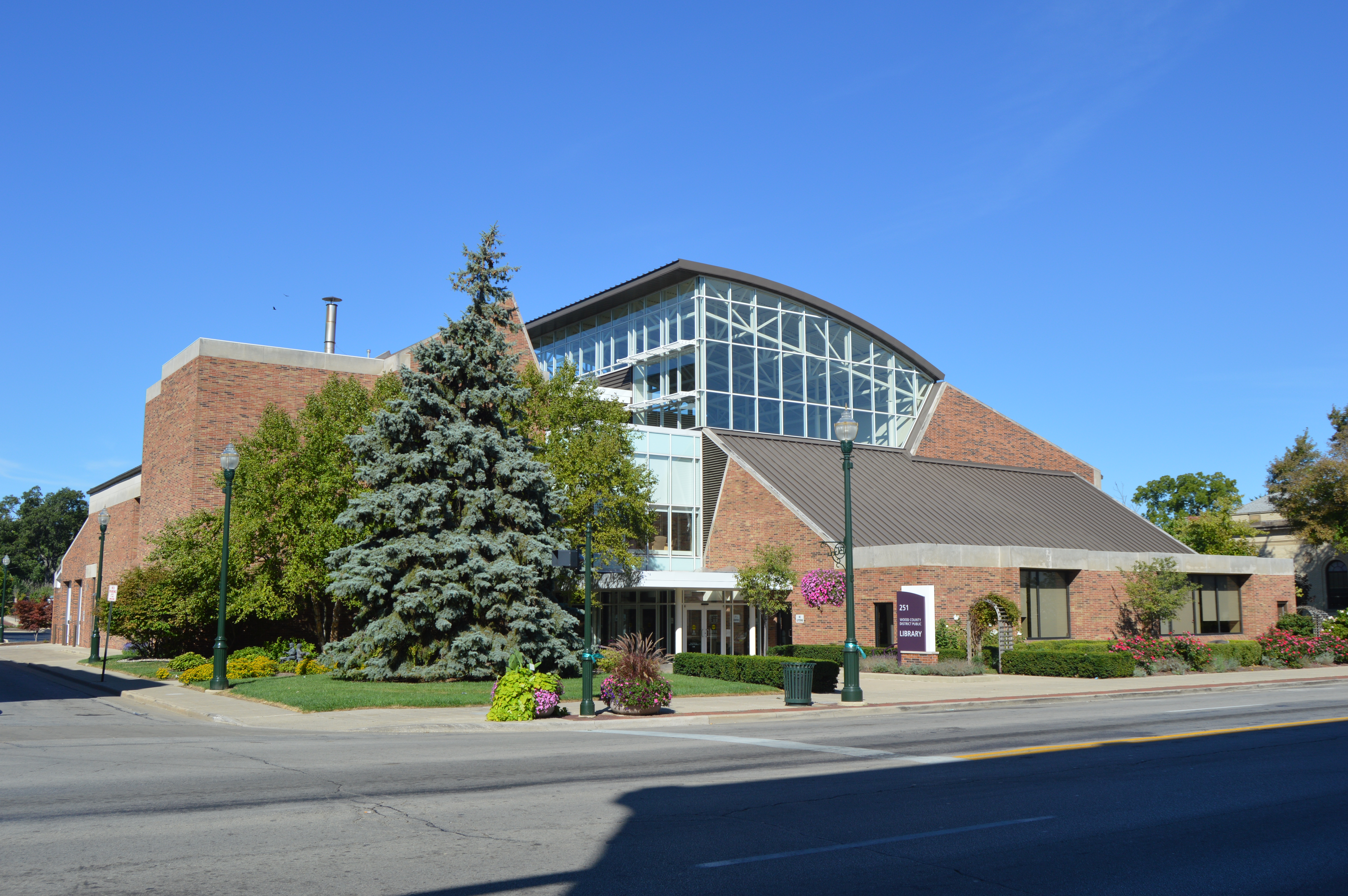
The main branch of the Wood County District Public Library

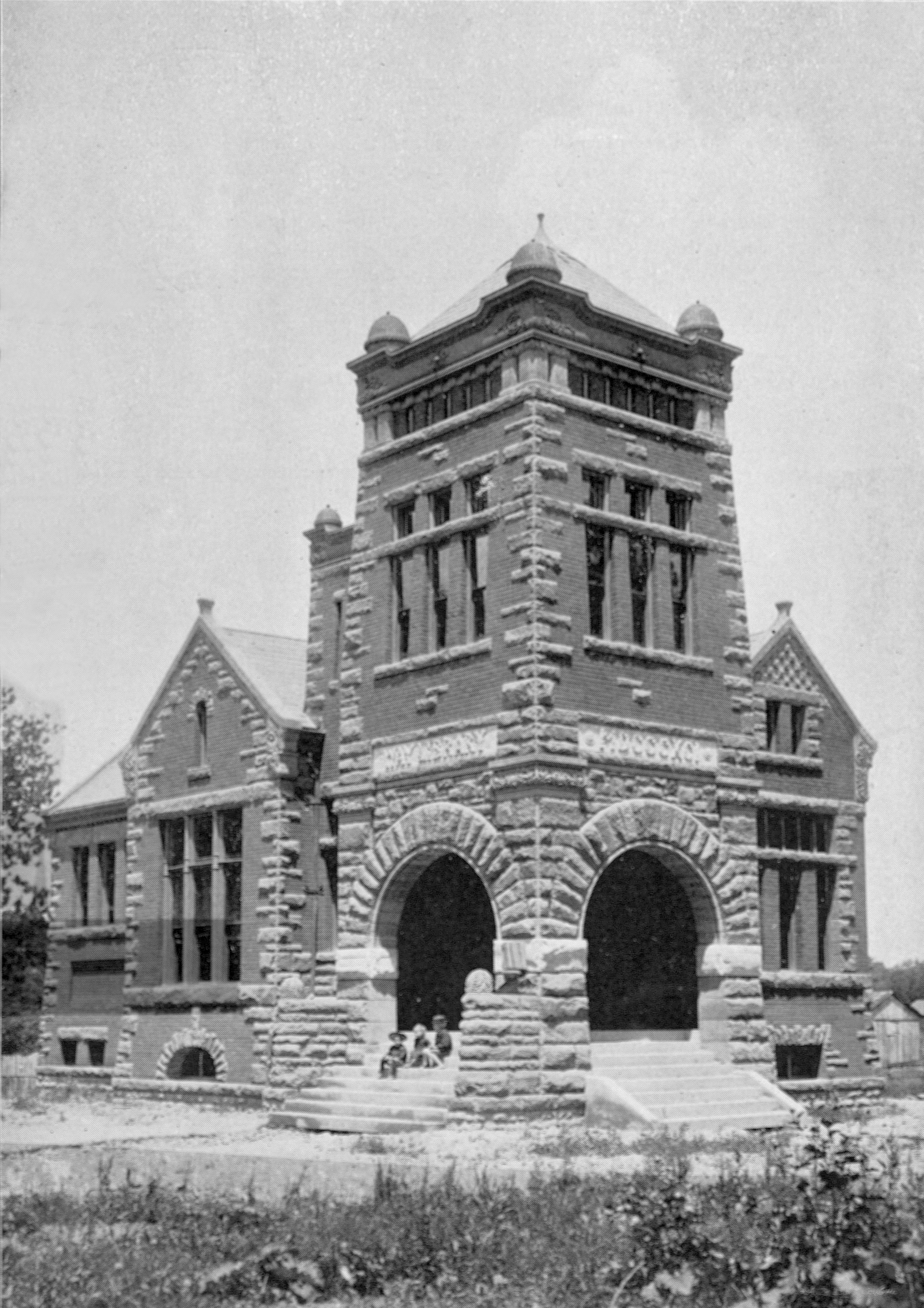
Way Public Library, 1892

While there is no countywide library entity, the Wood County District Public Library serves Bowling Green and other portions of the county, not otherwise served by another library entity, from its main location in Bowling Green and a branch in Walbridge. In 2019, the library had a total circulation of 783,166 items and provided 1,473 programs to its patrons. Total holdings in 2019 were 158,861 print materials, 21,469 video recordings, 12,967 audio recordings, and 171 periodical subscriptions.

Additional libraries include:

- North Baltimore Public Library
- Pemberville Public Library, and branches in Luckey and Stony Ridge
- Rossford Public Library
- Way Public Library in Perrysburg
- Wayne Public Library
- Weston Public Library, and Grand Rapids branch

A small portion of the county located in the Fostoria city limits is served by the Kaubisch Memorial Public Library, located in the Seneca County portion of the city.

All Wood County and Fostoria library locations participate in Woodlink, a joint catalog system.

== Transportation ==
The Wood County Airport is located one nautical mile (1.2 mi; 1.9 km) northeast of Bowling Green's central business district.

== Communities ==
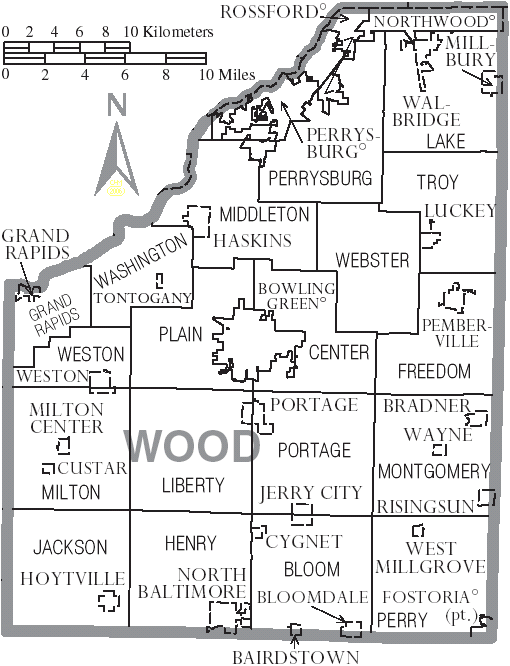
Map of Wood County, Ohio with municipal and township labels

=== Cities ===
- Bowling Green (county seat)
- Fostoria (a small portion)
- Northwood
- Perrysburg
- Rossford

=== Villages ===
- Bairdstown
- Bloomdale
- Bradner
- Custar
- Cygnet
- Grand Rapids
- Haskins
- Hoytville
- Jerry City
- Luckey
- Millbury
- Milton Center
- North Baltimore
- Pemberville
- Portage
- Risingsun
- Tontogany
- Walbridge
- Wayne
- West Millgrove
- Weston

=== Townships ===
- Bloom
- Center
- Freedom
- Grand Rapids
- Henry
- Jackson
- Lake
- Liberty
- Middleton
- Milton
- Montgomery
- Perry
- Perrysburg
- Plain
- Portage
- Troy
- Washington
- Webster
- Weston

=== Census-designated places ===
- Rudolph
- Stony Ridge

=== Unincorporated communities ===
- Bays
- Bloom Center
- Cloverdale
- Denver
- Digby
- Dowling
- Ducat
- Dunbridge
- Eagleville
- Galatea
- Hammansburg
- Hatton
- Hull Prairie
- Lemoyne
- Lime City
- Mermill
- Moline
- Mungen
- New Rochester
- Otsego
- Scotch Ridge
- Six Points
- Sugar Ridge
- Trombley
- Wingston
- Woodside

== Community Resources ==
=== The Cocoon ===
The Cocoon is a protective shelter for sexual and domestic violence victims in Wood County, Ohio. Beyond providing housing for survivors and their families, The Cocoon provides medical counsel, legal counsel, and support in finding permanent employment and residence. Organizing for the shelter began in 2000 with Bowling Green State University's Women's Center and Transformation Project in response to a rise in domestic violence homicides in Wood County. The Cocoon began operation in June 2005, and by 2012 all of its services were being conducted from its undisclosed location. By October 2015, The Cocoon had integrated sexual violence recovery and support as part of its programs.

Like many community organizations, The Cocoon faced sharp budget cuts during the COVID-19 pandemic. When the United States began lock downs in March 2020, The Cocoon witnessed a forty percent increase in calls from survivors and a fifty percent increase in sexual violence reports. In 2019, At the same time, the Victims of Crime Act's fund, which provides The Cocoon with approximately half of its funding (approximately $300,000), was cut by thirty-nine percent in October 2020. Although this did not halt operations, it significantly impacted The Cocoon's ability to provide comprehensive support for survivors.

In 2021, the American Rescue Plan Act granted Woods County $25 million in pandemic relief funds, of which Director Mulls requested $800,000. The Wood County Commissioners approved the request in March 2022. County Administrator Andrew Kalmar noted, "They've had a substantial reduction in revenue in the past few years, primarily because they've lost grant money from the federal government."

== See also ==
- National Register of Historic Places listings in Wood County, Ohio
- Wood County Courthouse and Jail
- Slippery Elm Trail
