= Wingston, Ohio =

Unincorporated community in Ohio, U.S.

Coordinates: 41°16′11″N 83°43′40″W

Wingston is an unincorporated community in Wood County, in the U.S. state of Ohio.

== History ==
A post office called Wingston was established in 1873, and remained in operation until 1905. Besides the post office, Wingston had a United Brethren Church.
