= Ducat, Ohio =

Unincorporated community in Ohio, U.S.

Coordinates: 41°16′59″N 83°40′12″W

Ducat is an unincorporated community in Wood County, in the U.S. state of Ohio.

== History ==
Ducat was platted in 1890, and named for Exea and Thomas J. Ducat, proprietors. A post office called Ducat was established in 1890, and remained in operation until 1909.
