= Lemoyne, Ohio =

Unincorporated community in Ohio, U.S.

Coordinates: 41°29′45″N 83°28′27″W

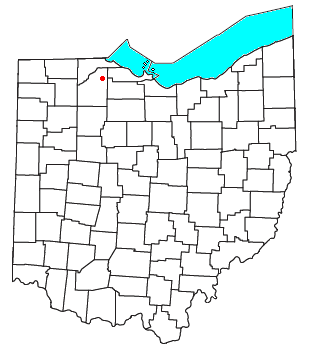
Location of Lemoyne, Ohio

Lemoyne is an unincorporated community in northern Troy Township, Wood County, Ohio, United States.

It has a post office with the ZIP code 43441. It lies along the concurrent U.S. Routes 20 and 23.

== History ==
Lemoyne was platted in 1877 when the railroad was extended to that point. The community most likely bears the French surname of a pioneer settler. A post office called Le Moyne was established in 1877, and the name was changed to Lemoyne in 1893.
