= Hammansburg, Ohio =

Unincorporated community in Ohio, U.S.

Coordinates: 41°13′35″N 83°41′19″W

Hammansburg is an unincorporated community in Wood County, in the U.S. state of Ohio.

== History ==
Hammansburg was platted in 1873, and named for William Hammond, proprietor. A post office called Hammansburgh was established in 1876, the name was changed to Hammansburg in 1893, and the post office closed in 1905.
