= Cloverdale, Wood County, Ohio =

Cloverdale, Ohio
- Unincorporated community
- Location within Ohio Location within the United States
- Coordinates: 41°20′29″N 83°34′26″W
- Country: United States
- State: Ohio
- County: Wood
- Elevation: 669 ft (204 m)
- Time zone: UTC-5 (Eastern (EST))
  - Summer (DST): UTC-4 (EDT)
- Postal code: 43551
- Area codes: 419 and 567
- GNIS feature ID: 1062702

Cloverdale is an unincorporated community in Wood County, Ohio, United States and is part of Portage Township and located at the intersection of Cloverdale and Kramer roads.

== History ==
A post office called Cloverdale was established in 1892, and remained in operation until 1904. Besides the post office, Cloverdale had a church building.
