= Troy Township, Wood County, Ohio =

Township in Ohio, US

- Township
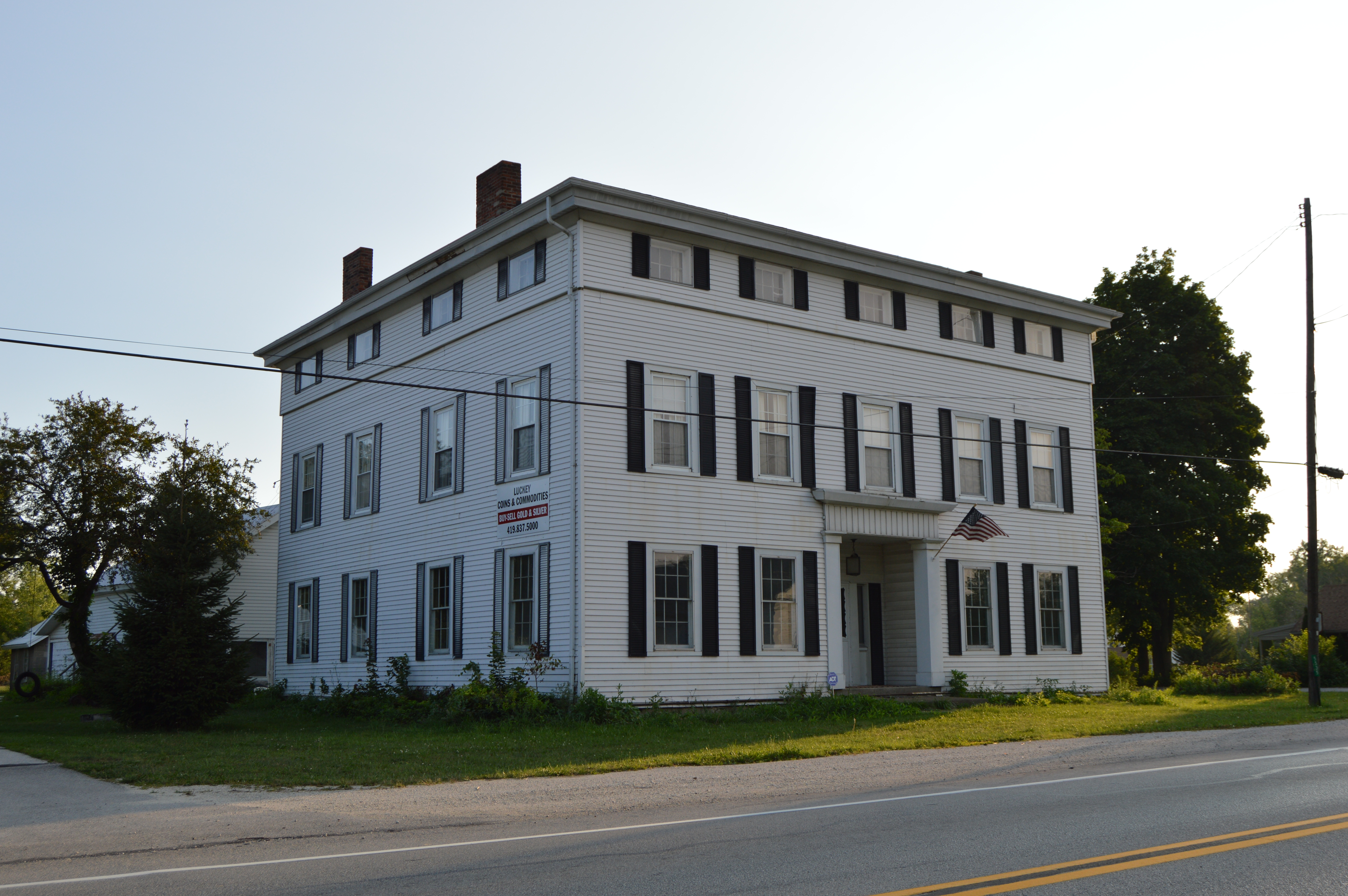
- The Empire House in Stony Ridge

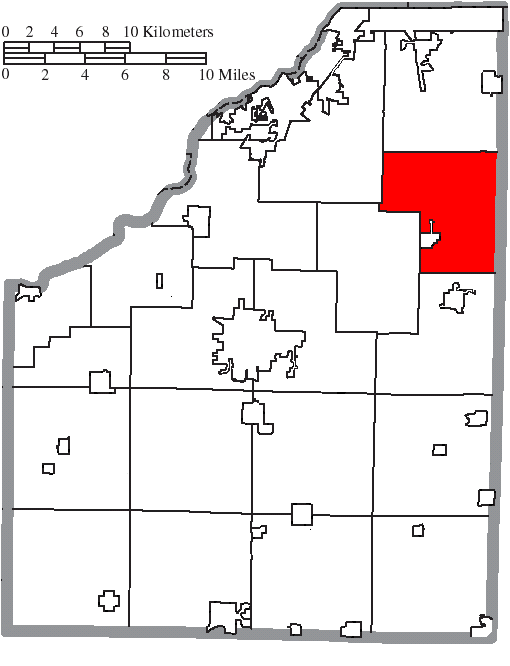
- Location of Troy Township in Wood County
- Coordinates: 41°28′11″N 83°28′13″W
- Country: United States
- State: Ohio
- County: Wood

Area
  - Total: 29.7 sq mi (77.0 km^{2})
  - Land: 29.7 sq mi (76.9 km^{2})
  - Water: 0.039 sq mi (0.1 km^{2})
- Elevation: 643 ft (196 m)

Population (2020)
  - Total: 4,097
  - Density: 138/sq mi (53.3/km^{2})
- Time zone: UTC-5 (Eastern (EST))
  - Summer (DST): UTC-4 (EDT)
- FIPS code: 39-77630
- GNIS feature ID: 1087198
- Website: https://troytownship.org/

Troy Township is one of the nineteen townships of Wood County, Ohio, United States. The 2020 census found 4,097 people in the township.

== Geography ==
Located in the northeastern part of the county, it borders the following townships:

- Lake Township - north
- Clay Township, Ottawa County - northeast
- Woodville Township, Sandusky County - east
- Freedom Township - south
- Webster Township - southwest
- Perrysburg Township - northwest

The village of Luckey is located in southwestern Troy Township, and the unincorporated communities of Lemoyne and Stony Ridge lie in the township's north and northwest respectively.

== Name and history ==
Troy Township was established in 1834. It is one of seven Troy Townships statewide.

== Government ==
The township is governed by a three-member board of trustees, who are elected in November of odd-numbered years to a four-year term beginning on the following January 1. Two are elected in the year after the presidential election and one is elected in the year before it. There is also an elected township fiscal officer, who serves a four-year term beginning on April 1 of the year after the election, which is held in November of the year before the presidential election. Vacancies in the fiscal officership or on the board of trustees are filled by the remaining trustees.
