= Bloom Center, Wood County, Ohio =

Unincorporated community in Ohio, U.S.

Coordinates: 41°12′39″N 83°35′34″W

Bloom Center is an unincorporated community in Wood County, Ohio.

== History ==
A variant name was Bloom. A post office called Bloom was established in 1854, but this post office was moved to Eagleville in about 1861. Besides the post office, Bloom Center had a schoolhouse, church, and cemetery.
