= Woodside, Ohio =

Unincorporated community in Ohio, U.S.

Coordinates: 41°21′08″N 83°27′59″W

Woodside is an unincorporated community in Wood County, in the U.S. state of Ohio.

== History ==
Woodside was platted in 1883. A post office called Woodside was in operation from 1883 until 1934.
