= Galatea, Ohio =

Unincorporated community in Ohio, U.S.

Coordinates: 41°10′40″N 83°38′41″W

Galatea is an unincorporated community in Wood County, in the U.S. state of Ohio.

== History ==
A post office called Galatea was established in 1887, and remained in operation until 1904. Galatea was located on the Toledo and Ohio Central Railroad.
