= Mungen, Ohio =

Unincorporated community in Ohio, U.S.

Coordinates: 41°16′29″N 83°39′00″W

Mungen is an unincorporated community in Wood County, in the U.S. state of Ohio.

== History ==
Mungen had its start when the Coldwater Railroad was extended to that point. A post office called Mungen was established in 1868, and remained in operation until 1909.
