= Otsego, Wood County, Ohio =

Unincorporated community in Ohio, U.S.

Coordinates: 41°26′51″N 83°46′45″W

Otsego is an unincorporated community in Wood County, in the U.S. state of Ohio.

== History ==
Otsego had its start before 1834 when a sawmill was built there.
