= Grand Rapids, Ohio =

Village in Ohio, USA

- Village
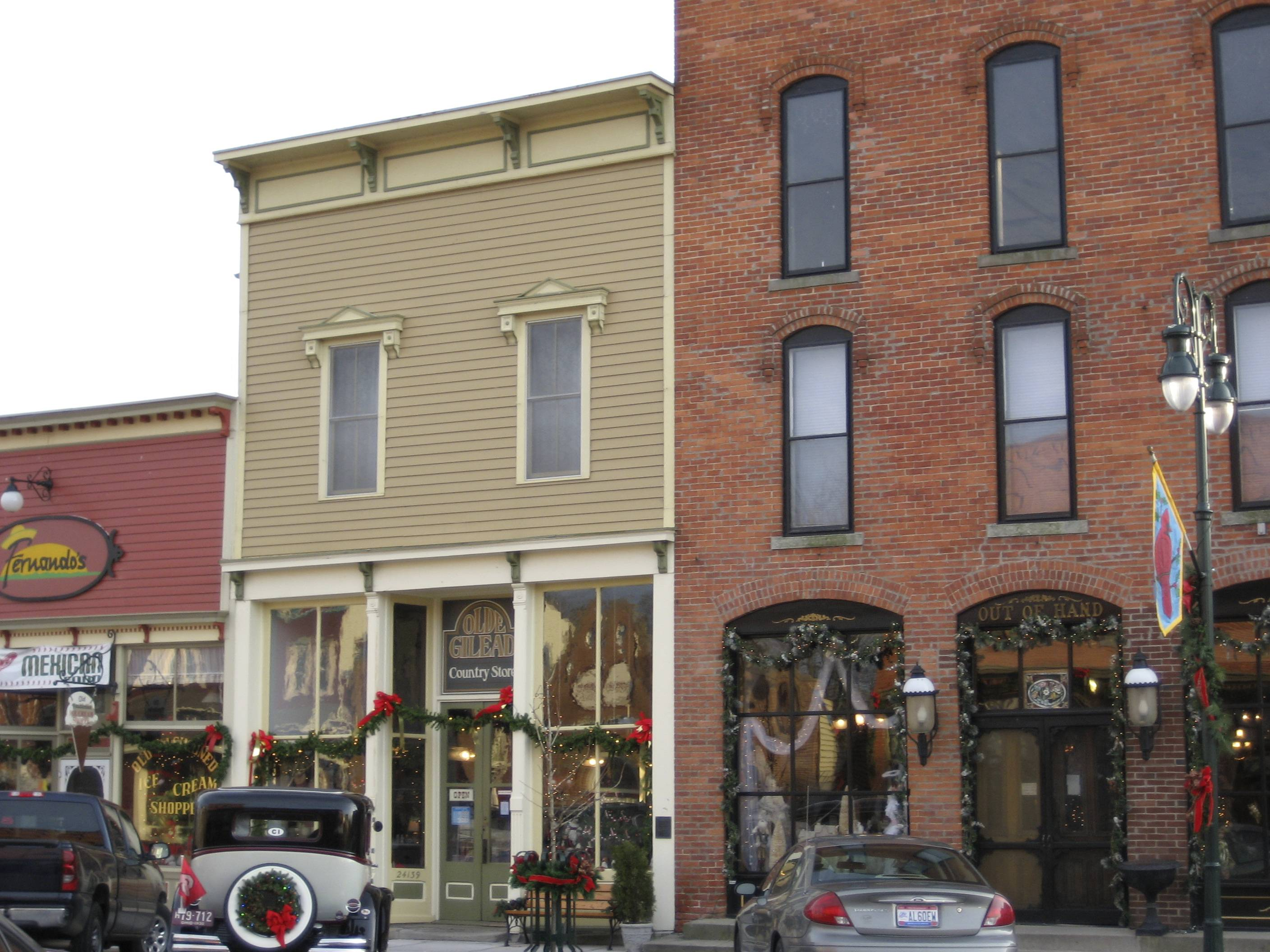
- Businesses in downtown Grand Rapids.

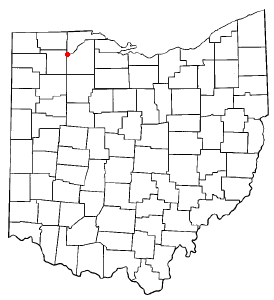
- Location of Grand Rapids, Ohio

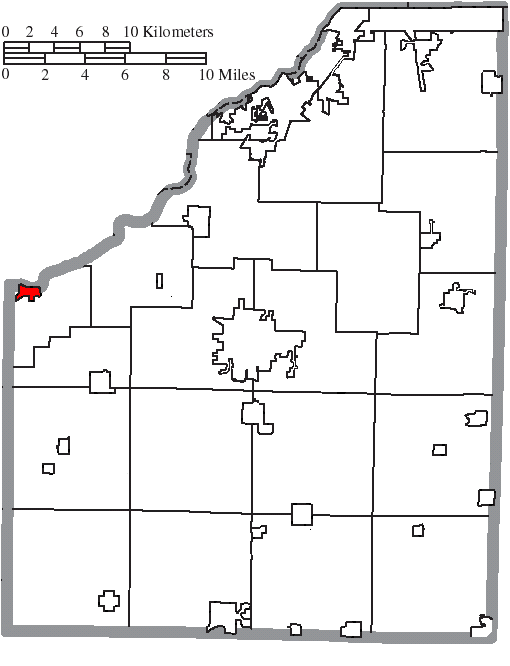
- Location of Grand Rapids in Wood County
- Coordinates: 41°24′25″N 83°52′25″W
- Country: United States
- State: Ohio
- County: Wood
- Township: Grand Rapids

Area
  - Total: 0.97 sq mi (2.51 km^{2})
  - Land: 0.88 sq mi (2.28 km^{2})
  - Water: 0.089 sq mi (0.23 km^{2})
- Elevation: 663 ft (202 m)

Population (2020)
  - Total: 925
  - Estimate (2023): 928
  - Density: 1,048.6/sq mi (404.88/km^{2})
- Time zone: UTC-5 (Eastern (EST))
  - Summer (DST): UTC-4 (EDT)
- ZIP code: 43522
- Area code: 419
- FIPS code: 39-31206
- GNIS feature ID: 2398187
- Website: grandrapidsohio.com

Grand Rapids is a village in Grand Rapids Township, Wood County, Ohio, United States, along the Maumee River. The population was 925 at the 2020 census. Grand Rapids is served by a branch of the Weston Public Library.

== History ==
Grand Rapids was originally called Gilead, and under the latter name was platted in 1833. To meet the challenges of keeping enough water in its canals in the 1840s, the state of Ohio built a large dam across the Maumee River at Gilead in 1845. Because the dam replaced a smaller dam that had been built to provide power to a mill and thereby restricted the water power provided to the mill, the outraged citizens of Gilead destroyed the dam. Following the destruction of the dam, a side cut canal was built that connected Gilead with the main canal. This caused an economic boom in Gilead and the village was incorporated as Grand Rapids in 1855.

A post office called Gilead was established in 1837, and the name was changed to Grand Rapids in 1868. The village was incorporated in 1885.

An ice jam led to a major flood in February 1959, resulting in extensive damage and displacing 130 residents.

== Geography ==
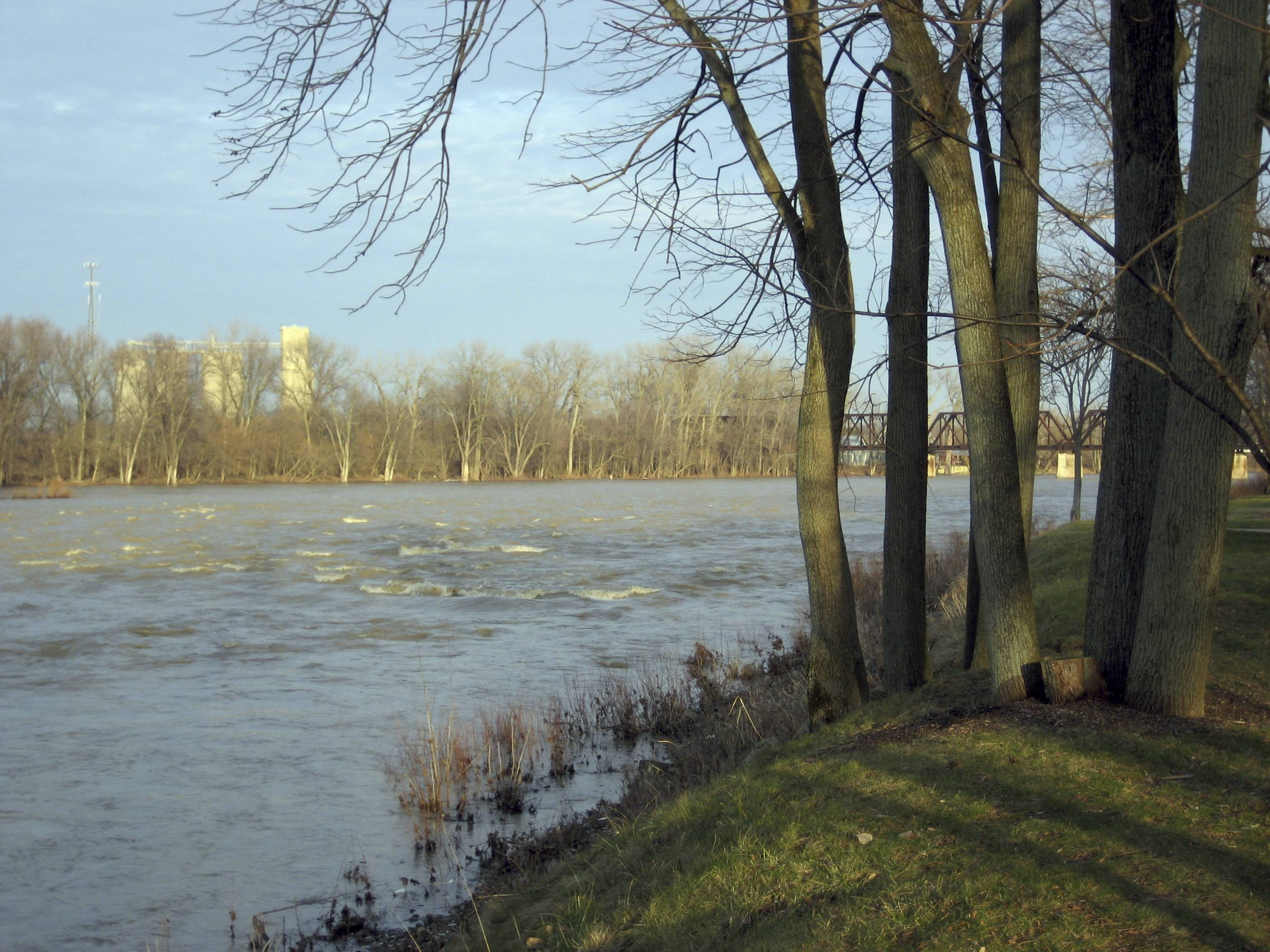
The Maumee River as seen from Grand Rapids

LaRoe's Restaurant, one of the oldest businesses in Grand Rapids

According to the United States Census Bureau, the village has a total area of 0.97 square miles (2.51 km^{2}), of which 0.88 square miles (2.28 km^{2}) is land and 0.09 square miles (0.23 km^{2}) is water.

== Demographics ==
Historical population
Census	Pop.	Note	%±
1880	332		—
1890	572		72.3%
1900	549		−4.0%
1910	574		4.6%
1920	517		−9.9%
1930	589		13.9%
1940	614		4.2%
1950	657		7.0%
1960	670		2.0%
1970	976		45.7%
1980	962		−1.4%
1990	955		−0.7%
2000	1,002		4.9%
2010	965		−3.7%
2020	925		−4.1%
2023 (est.)	928	▲	0.3%
U.S. Decennial Census

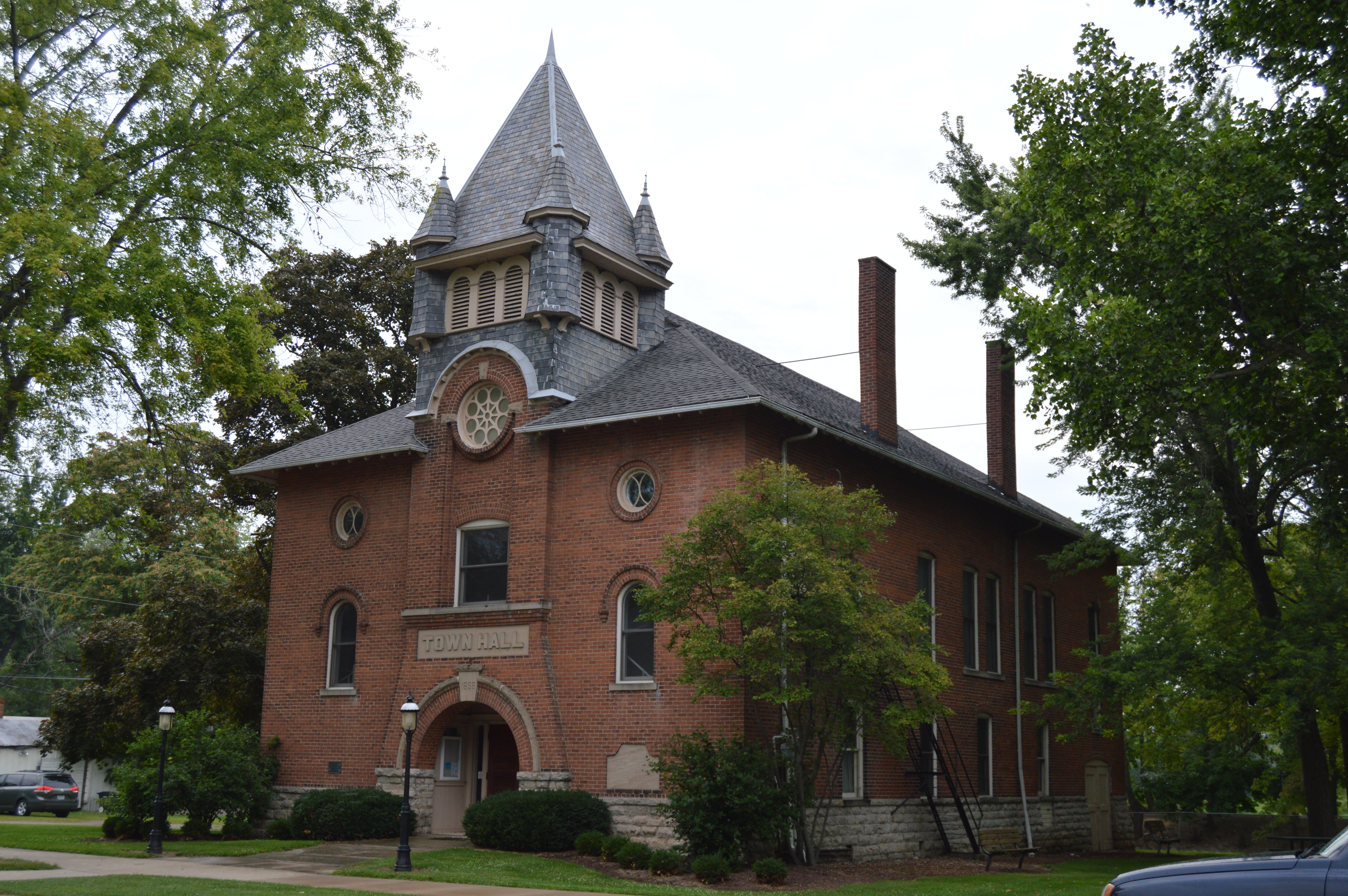
Grand Rapids Town Hall

=== 2010 census ===
As of the census of 2010, there were 965 people living in the village. The population density was 1,096.6 inhabitants per square mile (423.4/km^{2}). There were 429 housing units at an average density of 487.5 per square mile (188.2/km^{2}). The racial makeup of the village was 96.5% White, 0.5% African American, 0.2% Native American, 0.1% Asian, 0.8% from other races, and 1.9% from two or more races. Hispanic or Latino of any race were 3.9% of the population.

There were 385 households, of which 33.5% had children under the age of 18 living with them, 47.0% were married couples living together, 12.2% had a female householder with no husband present, 4.7% had a male householder with no wife present, and 36.1% were non-families. 29.1% of all households were made up of individuals, and 12.2% had someone living alone who was 65 years of age or older. The average household size was 2.42 and the average family size was 3.00.

The median age in the village was 38.9 years. 25.3% of residents were under the age of 18; 6.9% were between the ages of 18 and 24; 26.2% were from 25 to 44; 25.8% were from 45 to 64; and 15.6% were 65 years of age or older. The gender makeup of the village was 47.9% male and 52.1% female.

=== 2000 census ===
As of the census of 2000, the population density was 1,990.7 inhabitants per square mile (768.6/km^{2}). There were 423 housing units at an average density of 840.4 per square mile (324.5/km^{2}). The racial makeup of the village was 97.21% White, 0.20% African American, 0.20% Native American, 0.40% Asian, 1.60% from other races, and 0.40% from two or more races. Hispanic or Latino of any race were 2.89% of the population.

There were 402 households, out of which 32.8% had children under the age of 18 living with them, 53.2% were married couples living together, 9.0% had a female householder with no husband present, and 33.6% were non-families. 28.4% of all households were made up of individuals, and 11.2% had someone living alone who was 65 years of age or older. The average household size was 2.42 and the average family size was 2.98.

In the village, the population was spread out, with 24.9% under the age of 18, 7.8% from 18 to 24, 31.8% from 25 to 44, 21.7% from 45 to 64, and 13.9% who were 65 years of age or older. The median age was 35 years. For every 100 females there were 90.5 males. For every 100 females age 18 and over, there were 88.7 males.

The median income for a household in the village was $42,014, and the median income for a family was $50,982. Males had a median income of $35,357 versus $25,000 for females. The per capita income for the village was $19,796. About 2.6% of families and 5.7% of the population were below the poverty line, including 5.6% of those under age 18 and 10.4% of those age 65 or over.

== Notable people ==
- Edward Byers, Medal of Honor recipient
- Dominick Labino, glass researcher and artist
