= Luckey, Ohio =

- Village
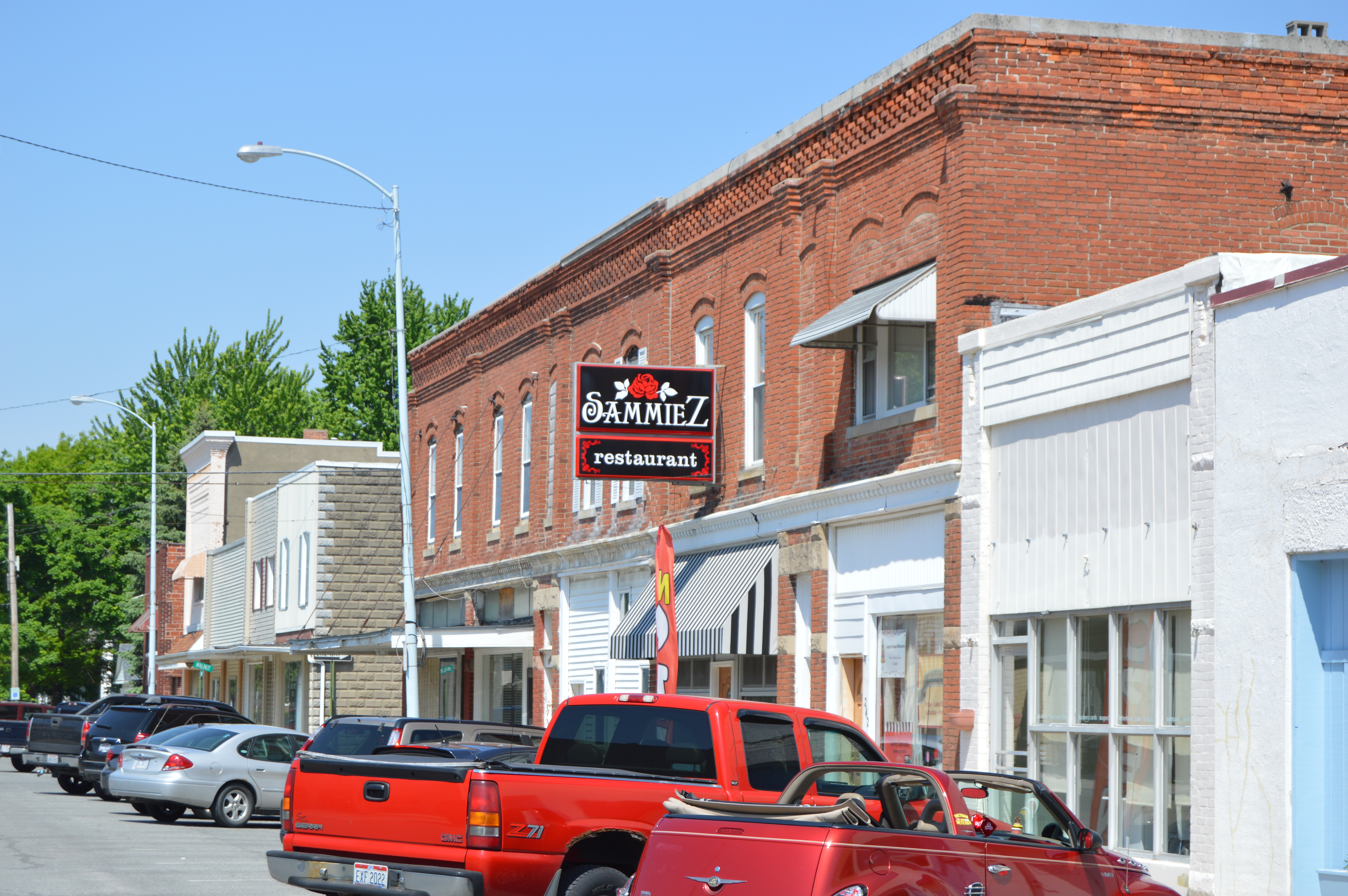
- Main Street downtown

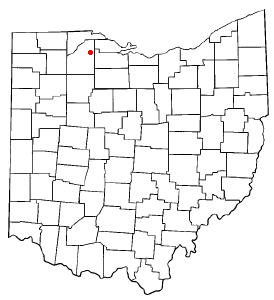
- Location of Luckey, Ohio

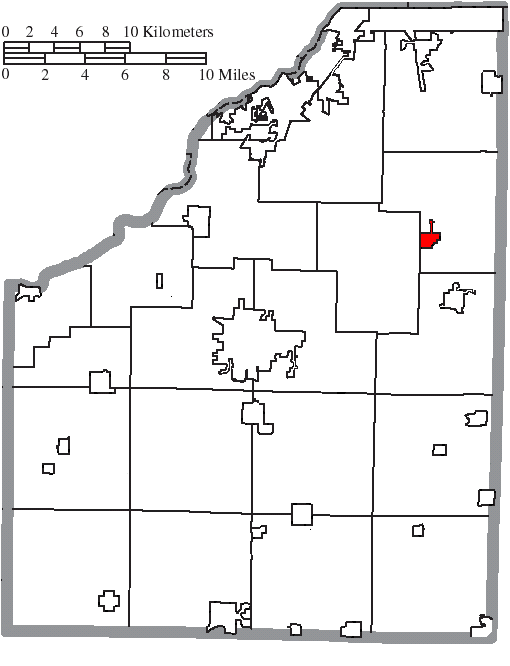
- Location of Luckey in Wood County
- Coordinates: 41°27′09″N 83°29′02″W
- Country: United States
- State: Ohio
- County: Wood
- Township: Troy

Area
  - Total: 0.69 sq mi (1.79 km^{2})
  - Land: 0.69 sq mi (1.79 km^{2})
  - Water: 0 sq mi (0.00 km^{2})
- Elevation: 666 ft (203 m)

Population (2020)
  - Total: 1,009
  - Density: 1,462.6/sq mi (564.73/km^{2})
- Time zone: UTC−5 (Eastern (EST))
  - Summer (DST): UTC−4 (EDT)
- ZIP code: 43443
- Area code: 419
- FIPS code: 39-45332
- GNIS feature ID: 2399199
- Website: http://luckeyohio.org/

Luckey is a village in Wood County, Ohio, United States. The population was 1,009 at the 2020 census.

== History ==
Luckey was named for Captain James B. Luckey, who served in the US Army from 1861 to 1864. In 1879 he bought 180 acres of land and built a saw mill on the site of the village. In 1881 Isaac Krotzer surveyed the town, and several businesses were established including a post office, stave factory, and hotel. A post office called Luckey has been in operation since 1881. The village was incorporated in 1940. From 1949 to 1958 there was a production site near the village that produced Beryllium under contract for the United States Atomic Energy Commission. In 2025, the Toledo Blade investigated concerns of radioactive materials leeching into the groundwater due to this facility as well as the burial of test reactor and found radioactivity levels significantly higher than background from various water sources in the surrounding areas. Government officials said that there are no problems with the former production site but say they will investigate further.

In 2019 NSG began construction of a float glass plant just outside Luckey for First Solar in Toledo, the first new glass plant in the US since 1980.

== Geography ==
According to the United States Census Bureau, the village has a total area of 0.69 square miles (1.79 km^{2}), all land.

== Demographics ==
Historical population
Census	Pop.	Note	%±
1950	764		—
1960	946		23.8%
1970	996		5.3%
1980	895		−10.1%
1990	848		−5.3%
2000	998		17.7%
2010	1,012		1.4%
2020	1,009		−0.3%
U.S. Decennial Census

=== 2010 census ===
Largest ancestries (2010)	Percent
German	63.0%
Irish	10.1%
English	8.0%
Polish	6.1%
Norwegian	3.9%
Welsh	3.7%

As of the census of 2010, there were 1,012 people, 383 households, and 283 families living in the village. The population density was 1,466.7 inhabitants per square mile (566.3/km^{2}). There were 405 housing units at an average density of 587.0 per square mile (226.6/km^{2}). The racial makeup of the village was 97.6% White, 0.2% African American, 0.8% Asian, 0.1% from other races, and 1.3% from two or more races. Hispanic or Latino of any race were 3.4% of the population.

There were 383 households, of which 38.1% had children under the age of 18 living with them, 57.4% were married couples living together, 12.3% had a female householder with no husband present, 4.2% had a male householder with no wife present, and 26.1% were non-families. 22.5% of all households were made up of individuals, and 8.3% had someone living alone who was 65 years of age or older. The average household size was 2.64 and the average family size was 3.08.

The median age in the village was 36.7 years. 26.1% of residents were under the age of 18; 9.7% were between the ages of 18 and 24; 26.4% were from 25 to 44; 24.5% were from 45 to 64; and 13.1% were 65 years of age or older. The gender makeup of the village was 49.3% male and 50.7% female.

=== 2000 census ===
Largest ancestries (2000)	Percent
German	45.8%
Irish	11.6%
English	8.5%
American	8.4%
Polish	5.7%
French	4.0%

As of the census of 2000, there were 998 people, 357 households, and 279 families living in the village. The population density was 1,475.0 inhabitants per square mile (569.5/km^{2}). There were 376 housing units at an average density of 555.7 per square mile (214.6/km^{2}). The racial makeup of the village was 96.59% White, 0.20% African American, 2.00% from other races, and 1.20% from two or more races. Hispanic or Latino of any race were 3.21% of the population.

There were 357 households, out of which 43.7% had children under the age of 18 living with them, 65.5% were married couples living together, 9.2% had a female householder with no husband present, and 21.6% were non-families. 19.3% of all households were made up of individuals, and 10.4% had someone living alone who was 65 years of age or older. The average household size was 2.80 and the average family size was 3.20.

In the village, the population was spread out, with 32.5% under the age of 18, 5.5% from 18 to 24, 30.3% from 25 to 44, 18.0% from 45 to 64, and 13.7% who were 65 years of age or older. The median age was 34 years. For every 100 females there were 93.0 males. For every 100 females age 18 and over, there were 94.2 males.

The median income for a household in the village was $47,917, and the median income for a family was $51,382. Males had a median income of $40,278 versus $24,338 for females. The per capita income for the village was $17,678. About 2.6% of families and 5.4% of the population were below the poverty line, including 7.6% of those under age 18 and 1.4% of those age 65 or over.
