= Denver, Wood County, Ohio =

Unincorporated community in Ohio, U.S.

Coordinates: 41°10′59″N 83°42′27″W

Denver is an unincorporated community in Wood County, in the U.S. state of Ohio.

== History ==
Denver was platted in 1875 on the Baltimore and Ohio Railroad line.
