= New Rochester, Paulding County, Ohio =

New Rochester, Ohio
- Unincorporated community
- Location within Ohio Location within the United States
- Coordinates: 41°13′47″N 84°36′08″W
- Country: United States
- State: Ohio
- County: Paulding
- Elevation: 719 ft (219 m)
- Time zone: UTC-5 (Eastern (EST))
  - Summer (DST): UTC-4 (EDT)
- Area codes: 419 & 567
- GNIS feature ID: 1061816

New Rochester is an unincorporated community in Paulding County, Ohio, United States. New Rochester is located along the northern border of Cecil.

New Rochester was the first county seat of Paulding County from 1839 for a little more than a year.

In 1839-40 there were about 30 to 40 families and three general stores. There was daily stagecoach service to Toledo and Fort Wayne. Three hotels and two blacksmiths serviced the stage and residents. There is no trace left of New Rochester but a monument ("1835 - 1935") and two cemeteries.
