= New Rochester, Wood County, Ohio =

New Rochester, Ohio
- Unincorporated community
- Location within Ohio Location within the United States
- Coordinates: 41°21′45″N 83°30′27″W
- Country: United States
- State: Ohio
- County: Wood
- Elevation: 666 ft (203 m)
- Time zone: UTC-5 (Eastern (EST))
  - Summer (DST): UTC-4 (EDT)
- Area codes: 419 & 567
- GNIS feature ID: 1065135

New Rochester is an unincorporated community in Wood County, Ohio, United States. New Rochester is located along U.S. Route 6 and Ohio State Route 199, 7.5 miles (12.1 km) east of Bowling Green.

== History ==
New Rochester was originally called Freedom, and under the latter name was platted in 1835. A post office called New Rochester was established in 1837, and remained in operation until 1903. The present name may be derived from East Rochester, Ohio, the former home of an early settler.
