= Trombley, Ohio =

Unincorporated community in Wood County, Ohio

- Unincorporated community
- Interactive map of Trombley, Ohio
- Coordinates: 41°15′14″N 83°38′43″W
- Country: United States
- State: Ohio
- County: Wood

Trombley is an unincorporated community in Wood County, in the U.S. state of Ohio.

== History ==
Trombley was originally called Blake, and under the latter name was platted in 1885. The present name honors one Mr. Trombley, the owner of a sawmill built on the site in 1885. A post office called Trombley was established in 1888, and remained in operation until 1908.
