= Six Points, Ohio =

Community in Ohio, United States

Coordinates: 41°16′57″N 83°33′17″W

Six Points is an unincorporated community in Wood County, in the U.S. state of Ohio. It is located about 17 miles (27.4 km) north of Findlay, Ohio and about 8 miles (12.9 km) southeast of Bowling Green, Ohio

== History ==
A post office called Six Points was established in 1879, the name was changed to Sixpoints in 1893, and the post office closed in 1901. Besides the post office, Six Points had a country store.
