= Washington Township, Wood County, Ohio =

Township in Ohio, US

- Township
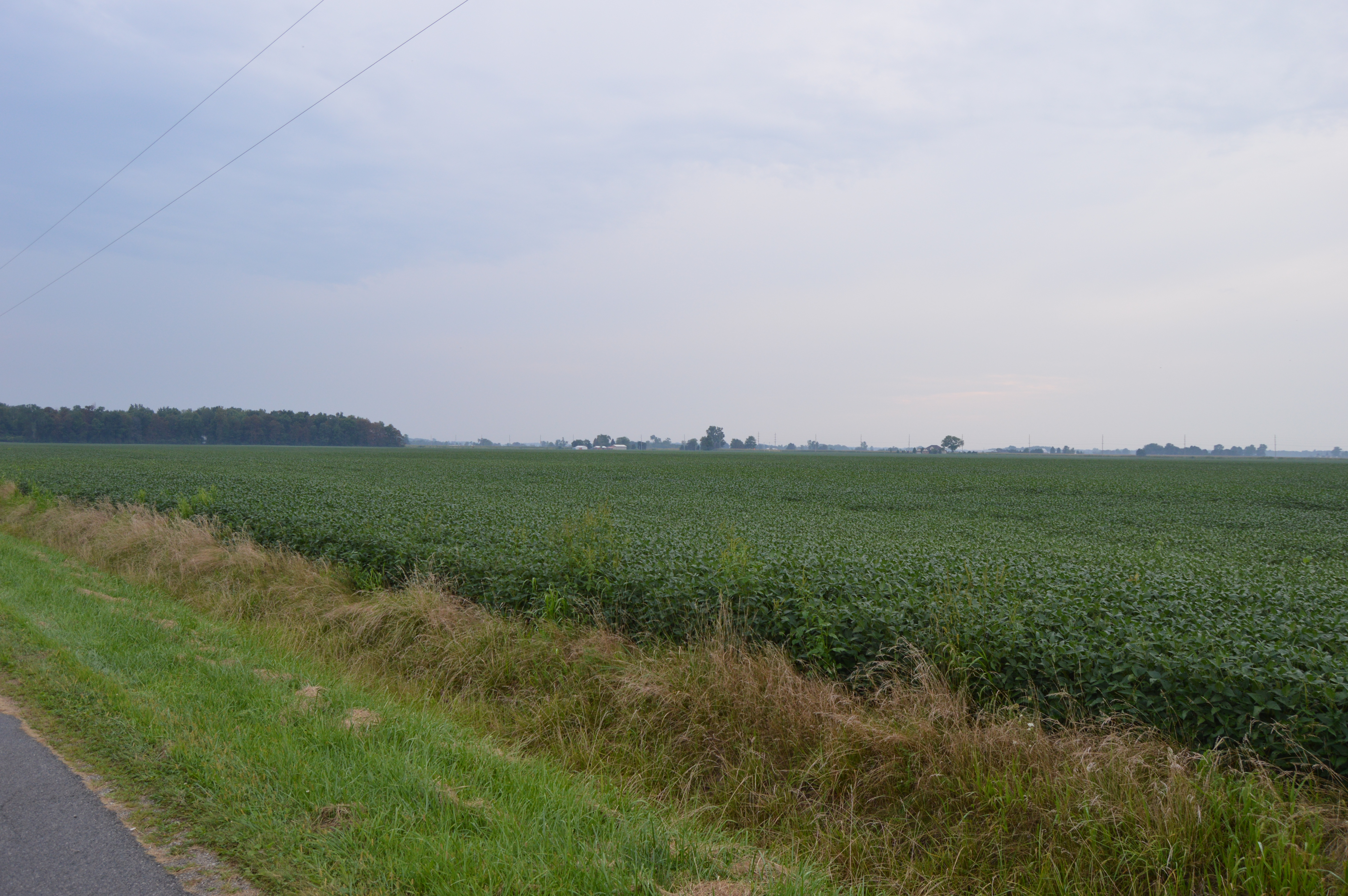
- Fields north of Weston

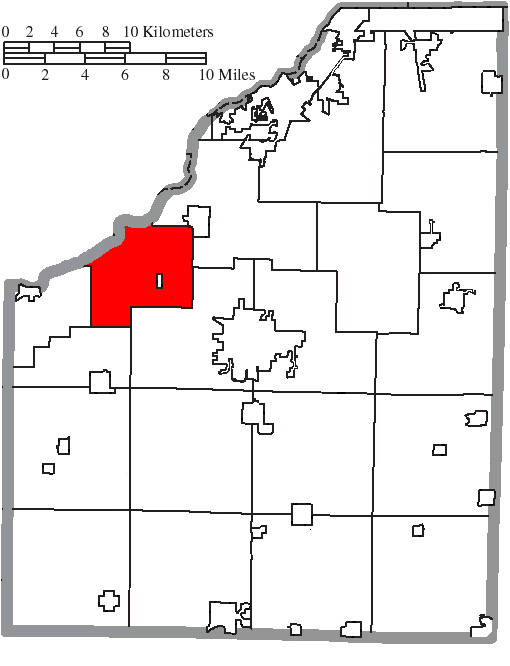
- Location of Washington Township in Wood County
- Coordinates: 41°25′23″N 83°45′35″W
- Country: United States
- State: Ohio
- County: Wood

Area
  - Total: 21.5 sq mi (55.6 km^{2})
  - Land: 20.9 sq mi (54.2 km^{2})
  - Water: 0.58 sq mi (1.5 km^{2})
- Elevation: 666 ft (203 m)

Population (2020)
  - Total: 1,864
  - Density: 89/sq mi (34.4/km^{2})
- Time zone: UTC-5 (Eastern (EST))
  - Summer (DST): UTC-4 (EDT)
- FIPS code: 39-81704
- GNIS feature ID: 1087199

Washington Township is one of the nineteen townships of Wood County, Ohio, United States. The 2020 census found 1,864 people in the township.

== Geography ==
Located in the northwestern part of the county along the Maumee River, it borders the following townships:

- Waterville Township, Lucas County - north
- Middleton Township - northeast
- Plain Township - southeast
- Weston Township - southwest
- Grand Rapids Township - west
- Providence Township, Lucas County - northwest

The village of Tontogany is located in south central Washington Township, and the unincorporated community of Otsego lies in the township's northeast.

== Name and history ==
Washington Township was established in 1837. It is one of forty-three Washington Townships in Ohio.

== Government ==
The township is governed by a three-member board of trustees, who are elected in November of odd-numbered years to a four-year term beginning on the following January 1. Two are elected in the year after the presidential election and one is elected in the year before it. There is also an elected township fiscal officer, who serves a four-year term beginning on April 1 of the year after the election, which is held in November of the year before the presidential election. Vacancies in the fiscal officership or on the board of trustees are filled by the remaining trustees.
