= Eagleville, Wood County, Ohio =

Unincorporated community in Ohio, U.S.

Coordinates: 41°11′50″N 83°33′19″W

Eagleville is an unincorporated community in Wood County, in the U.S. state of Ohio.

== History ==
Eagleville was platted in 1852. Variant names were Bloom and Ted. A post office called Ted was established in 1885, and remained in operation until 1904.
