= Weston, Ohio =

- Village
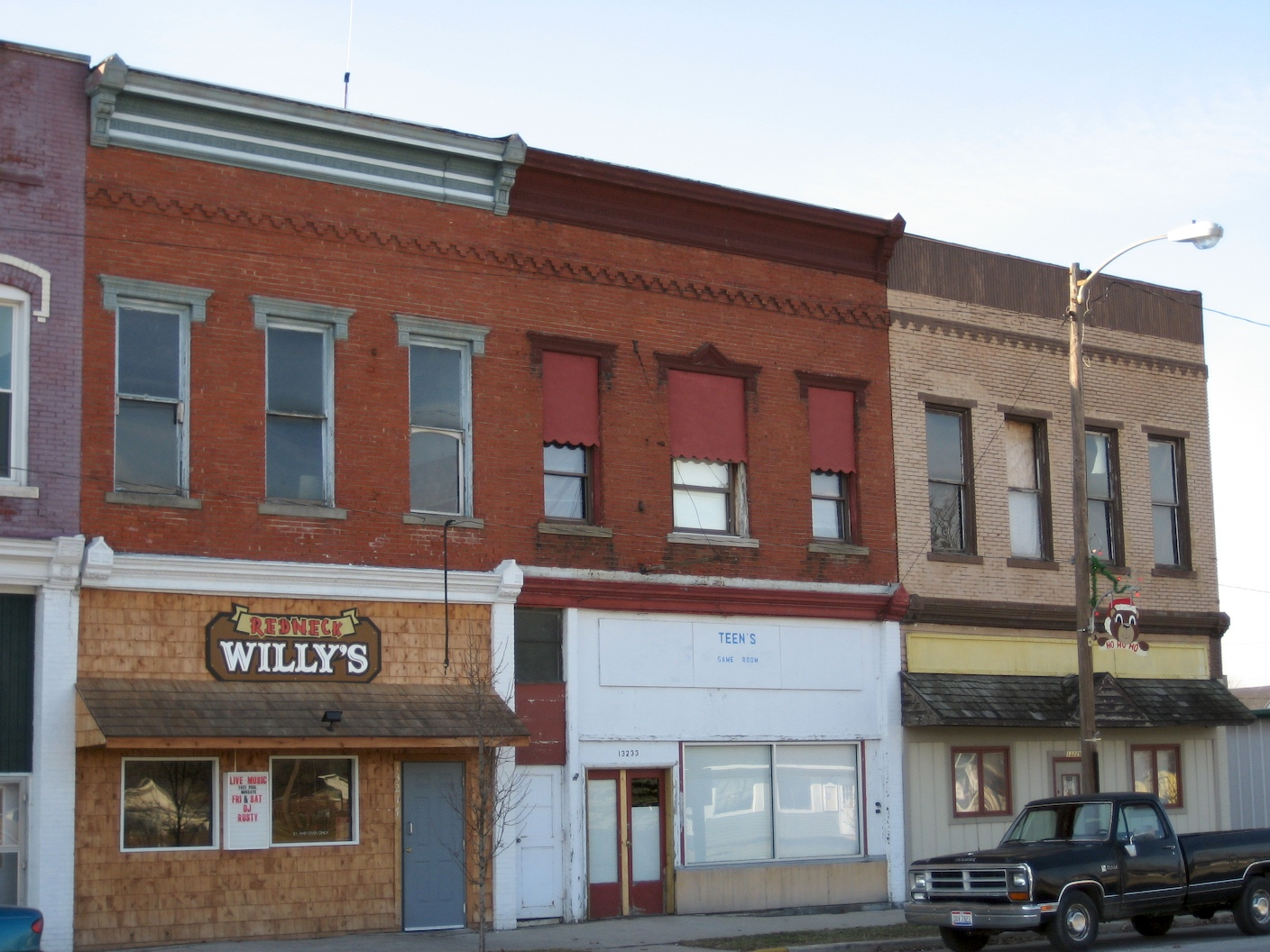
- Local businesses in downtown Weston

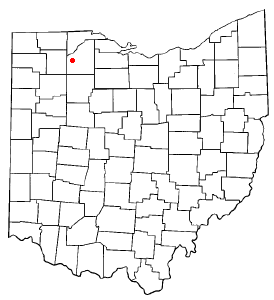
- Location of Weston, Ohio

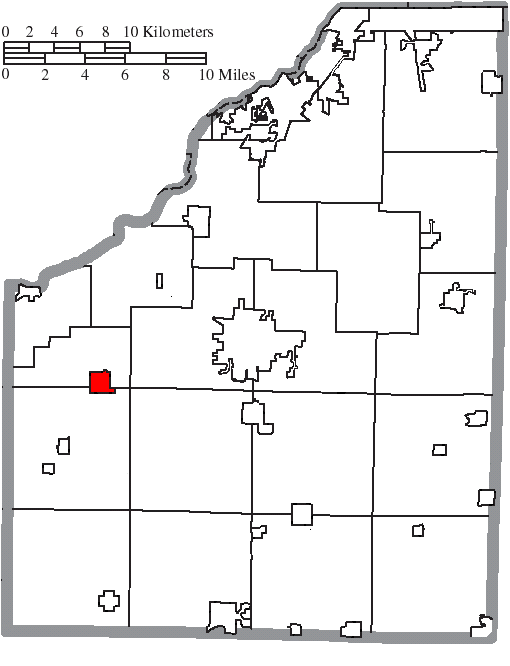
- Location of Weston in Wood County
- Coordinates: 41°20′47″N 83°47′41″W
- Country: United States
- State: Ohio
- County: Wood

Area
  - Total: 1.14 sq mi (2.96 km^{2})
  - Land: 1.14 sq mi (2.95 km^{2})
  - Water: 0.0039 sq mi (0.01 km^{2})
- Elevation: 679 ft (207 m)

Population (2020)
  - Total: 1,455
  - Density: 1,276.7/sq mi (492.93/km^{2})
- Time zone: UTC-5 (Eastern (EST))
  - Summer (DST): UTC-4 (EDT)
- ZIP code: 43569
- Area code: 419
- FIPS code: 39-83972
- GNIS feature ID: 2400154
- Website: http://www.westonohio.org/

Weston is a village in Wood County, Ohio, United States. The population was 1,455 at the 2020 census. Weston is located just 10 miles west of Bowling Green, Ohio, a university town.

== History ==
Weston United Methodist Church

Weston was originally called Taylortown, and under the latter name was platted in 1853 by Thomas Taylor, and named for him. Another early variant name was New Westfield. The present name is from Weston Township. A post office called New Westfield was established in 1856, and the name was changed to Weston in 1863. The village was incorporated in 1873.

== Geography ==
According to the United States Census Bureau, the village has a total area of 1.13 square miles (2.93 km^{2}), all land.

== Demographics ==
Historical population
| Census | Pop. | Note | %± |
|---|---|---|---|
| 1880 | 698 | | — |
| 1890 | 845 | | 21.1% |
| 1900 | 953 | | 12.8% |
| 1910 | 913 | | −4.2% |
| 1920 | 844 | | −7.6% |
| 1930 | 794 | | −5.9% |
| 1940 | 859 | | 8.2% |
| 1950 | 973 | | 13.3% |
| 1960 | 1,075 | | 10.5% |
| 1970 | 1,269 | | 18.0% |
| 1980 | 1,708 | | 34.6% |
| 1990 | 1,716 | | 0.5% |
| 2000 | 1,659 | | −3.3% |
| 2010 | 1,590 | | −4.2% |
| 2020 | 1,455 | | −8.5% |
U.S. Decennial Census

=== 2010 census ===
As of the census of 2010, there were 1,590 people, 609 households, and 424 families living in the village. The population density was 1,407.1 inhabitants per square mile (543.3/km^{2}). There were 700 housing units at an average density of 619.5 per square mile (239.2/km^{2}). The racial makeup of the village was 91.6% White, 0.1% African American, 1.0% Native American, 0.1% Asian, 4.8% from other races, and 2.4% from two or more races. Hispanic or Latino of any race were 11.8% of the population.

There were 609 households, of which 37.1% had children under the age of 18 living with them, 49.4% were married couples living together, 15.6% had a female householder with no husband present, 4.6% had a male householder with no wife present, and 30.4% were non-families. 25.1% of all households were made up of individuals, and 8.3% had someone living alone who was 65 years of age or older. The average household size was 2.60 and the average family size was 3.07.

The median age in the village was 35.8 years. 29.2% of residents were under the age of 18; 6.7% were between the ages of 18 and 24; 26.8% were from 25 to 44; 26.4% were from 45 to 64; and 10.9% were 65 years of age or older. The gender makeup of the village was 49.4% male and 50.6% female.

=== 2000 census ===
As of the census of 2000, there were 1,659 people, 638 households, and 454 families living in the village. The population density was 1,476.2 inhabitants per square mile (570.0/km^{2}). There were 662 housing units at an average density of 589.1 per square mile (227.5/km^{2}). The racial makeup of the village was 93.31% White, 0.18% African American, 0.12% Native American, 0.12% Asian, 3.74% from other races, and 2.53% from two or more races. Hispanic or Latino of any race were 9.10% of the population

== Library ==
The Weston Public Library serves the communities in southwestern Wood County from its administrative offices in Weston and a branch in Grand Rapids. In 2006, the library loaned 96,919 items and provided 186 programs to its 3,399 cardholders. Total holdings in 2006 were over 35,000 volumes with over 130 periodical subscriptions.
