= Weston Township, Wood County, Ohio =

Township in Ohio, US

- Township
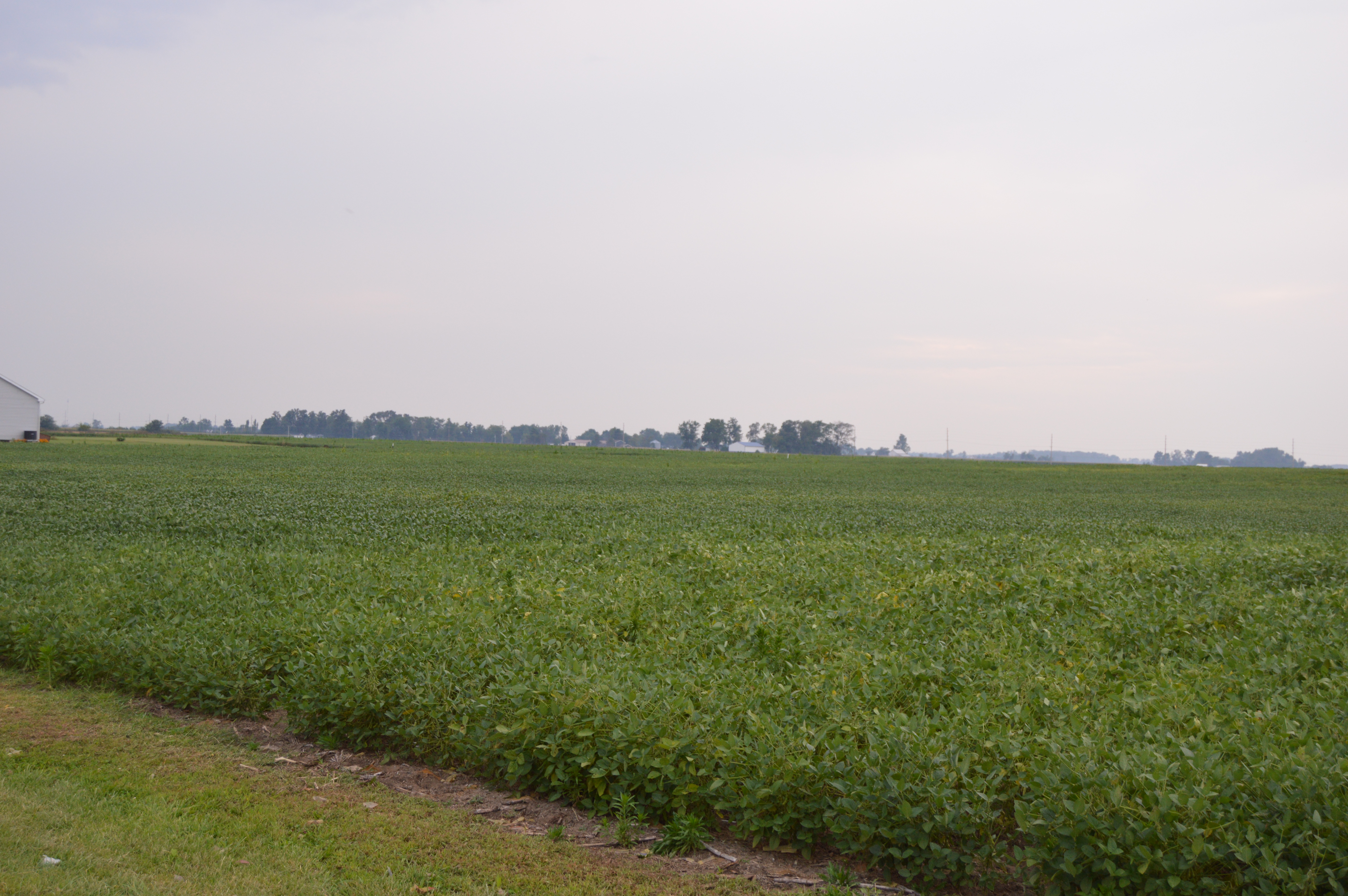
- Fields on Van Tassel Road north of Weston

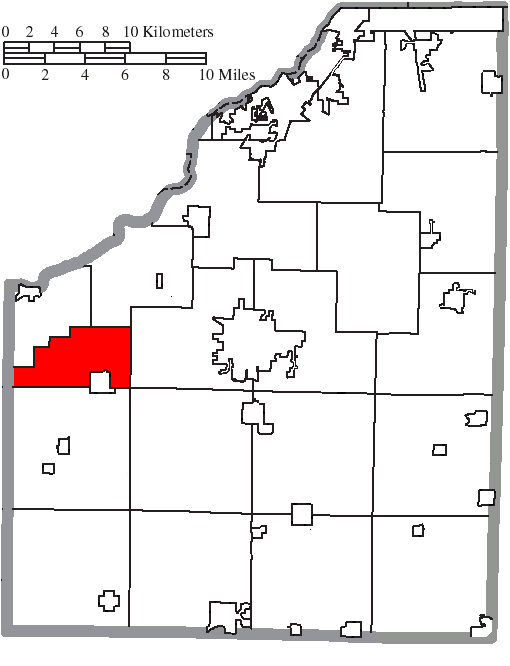
- Location of Weston Township in Wood County
- Coordinates: 41°21′9″N 83°48′0″W
- Country: United States
- State: Ohio
- County: Wood

Area
  - Total: 14.4 sq mi (37.3 km^{2})
  - Land: 14.4 sq mi (37.3 km^{2})
  - Water: 0 sq mi (0.0 km^{2})
- Elevation: 676 ft (206 m)

Population (2020)
  - Total: 2,124
  - Density: 147/sq mi (56.9/km^{2})
- Time zone: UTC-5 (Eastern (EST))
  - Summer (DST): UTC-4 (EDT)
- ZIP code: 43569
- Area code: 419
- FIPS code: 39-83986
- GNIS feature ID: 1087201

Weston Township is one of the nineteen townships of Wood County, Ohio, United States. The 2020 census found 2,124 people in the township.

== Geography ==
Located in the western part of the county, it borders the following townships:

- Washington Township - North
- Plain Township - East
- Liberty Township - South-Eastern corner
- Milton Township - South
- Richfield Township, Henry County - South-Western corner
- Damascus Township, Henry County - West
- Grand Rapids Township - Northwest

Part of the village of Weston is located in southeastern Weston Township.

== Name and history ==
Weston Township was established in 1830. It is the only Weston Township statewide.

== Government ==
The township is governed by a three-member board of trustees, who are elected in November of odd-numbered years to a four-year term beginning on the following January 1. Two are elected in the year after the presidential election and one is elected in the year before it. There is also an elected township fiscal officer, who serves a four-year term beginning on April 1 of the year after the election, which is held in November of the year before the presidential election. Vacancies in the fiscal officership or on the board of trustees are filled by the remaining trustees.

The Weston Township Hall is located at the intersection of Euler and Van Tassel roads, just north of Weston.
