= Tontogany, Ohio =

Village Of Tontogany, Ohio
- Village
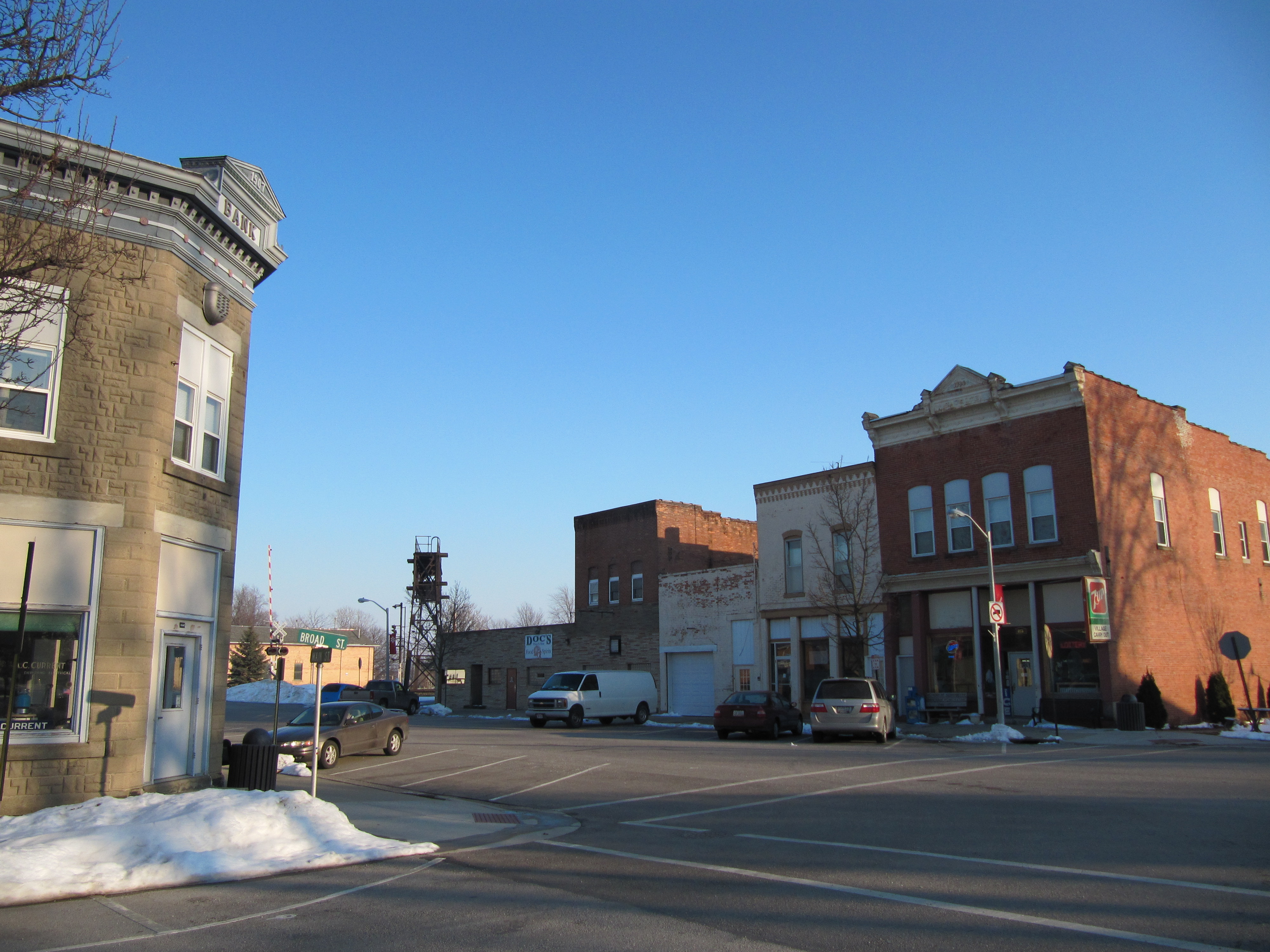
- Looking East in downtown Tontogany, Ohio from Main and Broad streets toward the railroad intersection.

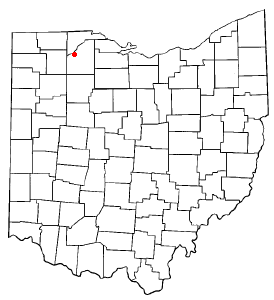
- Location of Tontogany, Ohio

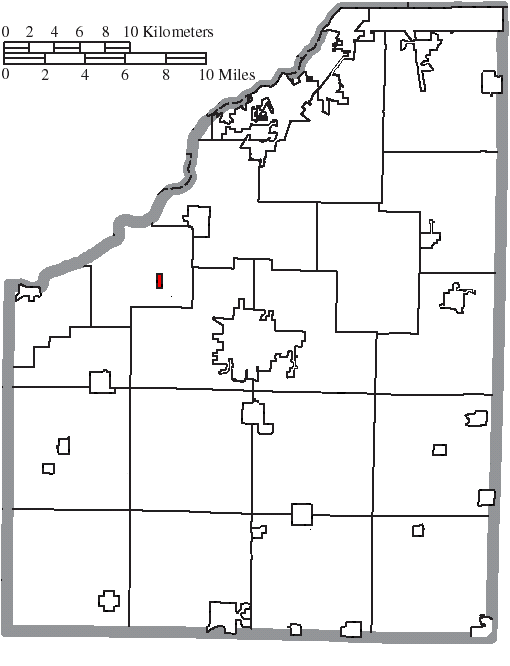
- Location of Tontogany in Wood County
- Coordinates: 41°25′16″N 83°44′28″W
- Country: United States
- State: Ohio
- County: Wood
- Township: Washington

Area
  - Total: 0.31 sq mi (0.79 km^{2})
  - Land: 0.31 sq mi (0.79 km^{2})
  - Water: 0 sq mi (0.00 km^{2})
- Elevation: 666 ft (203 m)

Population (2020)
  - Total: 387
  - Density: 1,269.5/sq mi (490.17/km^{2})
- Time zone: UTC-5 (Eastern (EST))
  - Summer (DST): UTC-4 (EDT)
- ZIP code: 43565
- Area code: 419
- FIPS code: 39-77070
- GNIS feature ID: 2399994
- Website: https://tontoganyohio.gov/

Tontogany is a village in Wood County, Ohio, United States. The population was 387 at the 2020 census. Every Fall the village holds a festival called "ToganyFest" and gathers many people in the county.

== History ==
Tontogany was platted in 1855, and named for Tontogany, a Native American chief. A post office called Tontogany has been in operation since 1857. The village was incorporated in 1874. In 2016, six cars from a CSX train derailed in downtown Tontogany, causing significant damage to the area.

== Geography ==
According to the United States Census Bureau, the village has a total area of 0.31 square miles (0.80 km^{2}), all land.

== Demographics ==
Historical population
Census	Pop.	Note	%±
1880	343		—
1890	283		−17.5%
1900	352		24.4%
1910	314		−10.8%
1920	303		−3.5%
1930	367		21.1%
1940	369		0.5%
1950	368		−0.3%
1960	380		3.3%
1970	395		3.9%
1980	367		−7.1%
1990	364		−0.8%
2000	364		0.0%
2010	367		0.8%
2020	387		5.4%
U.S. Decennial Census

=== 2010 census ===
As of the census of 2010, there were 367 people, 146 households, and 103 families living in the village. The population density was 1,183.9 inhabitants per square mile (457.1/km^{2}). There were 162 housing units at an average density of 522.6 per square mile (201.8/km^{2}). The racial makeup of the village was 97.8% White, 0.3% Native American, 1.1% from other races, and 0.8% from two or more races. Hispanic or Latino of any race were 8.7% of the population.

There were 146 households, of which 34.9% had children under the age of 18 living with them, 50.0% were married couples living together, 13.7% had a female householder with no husband present, 6.8% had a male householder with no wife present, and 29.5% were non-families. 23.3% of all households were made up of individuals, and 10.2% had someone living alone who was 65 years of age or older. The average household size was 2.51 and the average family size was 2.95.

The median age in the village was 37.5 years. 28.1% of residents were under the age of 18; 7.3% were between the ages of 18 and 24; 25.1% were from 25 to 44; 26.2% were from 45 to 64; and 13.4% were 65 years of age or older. The gender makeup of the village was 51.2% male and 48.8% female.

=== 2000 census ===
As of the census of 2000, there were 364 people, 136 households, and 102 families living in the village. The population density was 1,996.1 inhabitants per square mile (770.7/km^{2}). There were 138 housing units at an average density of 756.8 per square mile (292.2/km^{2}). The racial makeup of the village was 98.90% White, 0.55% from other races, and 0.55% from two or more races. Hispanic or Latino of any race were 4.12% of the population.

There were 136 households, out of which 45.6% had children under the age of 18 living with them, 62.5% were married couples living together, 8.8% had a female householder with no husband present, and 24.3% were non-families. 21.3% of all households were made up of individuals, and 11.8% had someone living alone who was 65 years of age or older. The average household size was 2.68 and the average family size was 3.12.

In the village, the population was spread out, with 31.3% under the age of 18, 6.3% from 18 to 24, 30.5% from 25 to 44, 18.1% from 45 to 64, and 13.7% who were 65 years of age or older. The median age was 35 years. For every 100 females there were 103.4 males. For every 100 females age 18 and over, there were 100.0 males.

The median income for a household in the village was $41,875, and the median income for a family was $55,500. Males had a median income of $30,417 versus $27,188 for females. The per capita income for the village was $17,578. About 1.9% of families and 5.1% of the population were below the poverty line, including 7.0% of those under age 18 and none of those age 65 or over.
