= Grand Rapids Township, Wood County, Ohio =

Township in Ohio, US

- Township
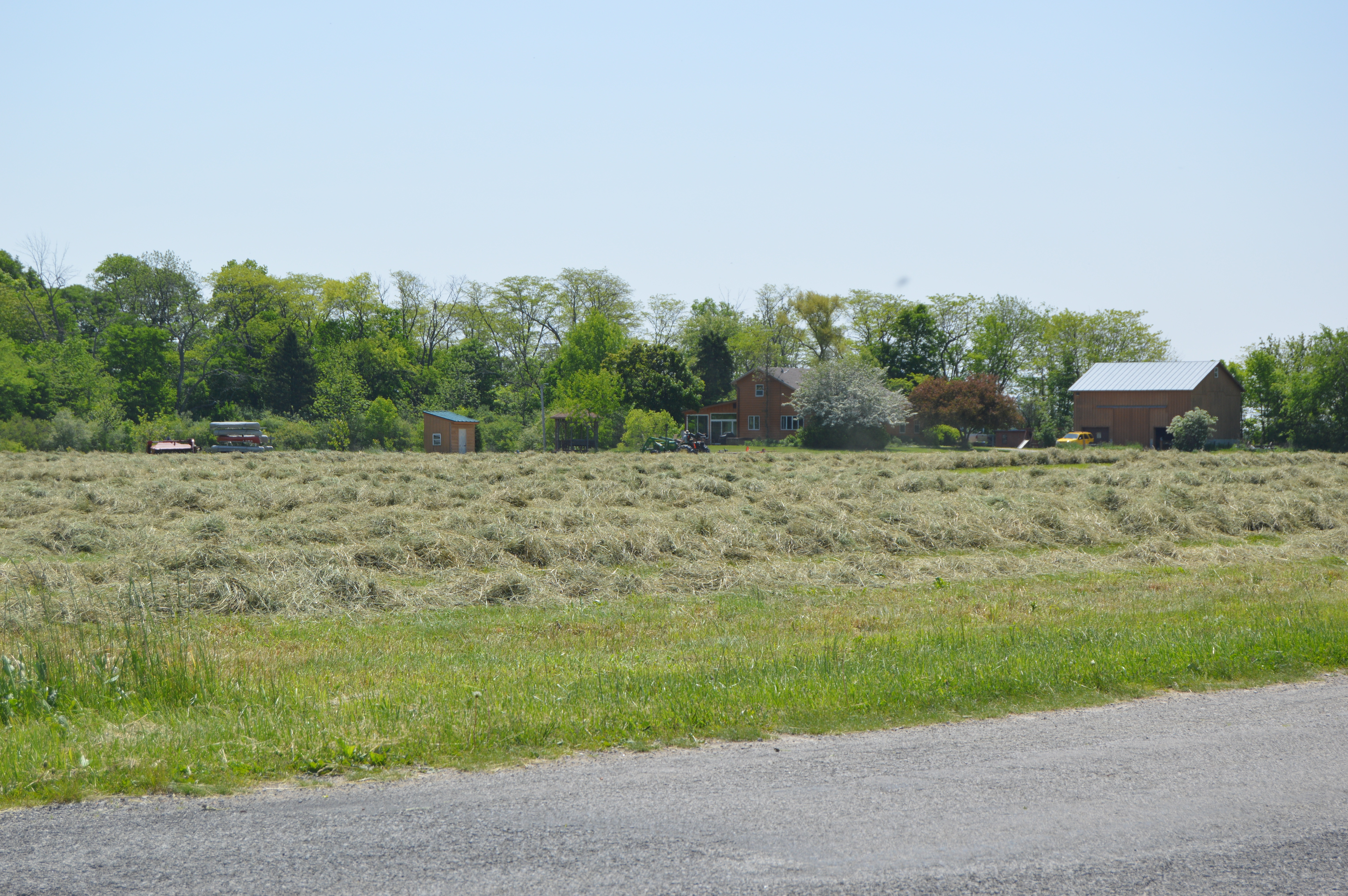
- Hay field on Benschoter Road

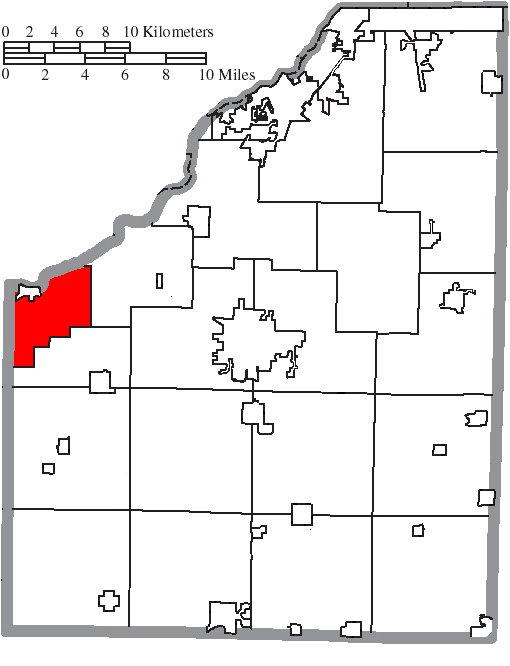
- Location of Grand Rapids Township in Wood County
- Coordinates: 41°24′33″N 83°51′27″W
- Country: United States
- State: Ohio
- County: Wood

Area
  - Total: 13.9 sq mi (36.1 km^{2})
  - Land: 13.5 sq mi (34.9 km^{2})
  - Water: 0.42 sq mi (1.1 km^{2})
- Elevation: 659 ft (201 m)

Population (2020)
  - Total: 1,586
  - Density: 118/sq mi (45.4/km^{2})
- Time zone: UTC-5 (Eastern (EST))
  - Summer (DST): UTC-4 (EDT)
- ZIP code: 43522
- Area code: 419
- FIPS code: 39-31220
- GNIS feature ID: 1087183

Grand Rapids Township is one of the nineteen townships of Wood County, Ohio, United States. The 2020 census found 1,586 people in the township.

== Geography ==
Located in the northwestern part of the county, it borders the following townships:

- Providence Township, Lucas County - north
- Washington Township - east
- Weston Township - southeast
- Damascus Township, Henry County - west
- Washington Township, Henry County - northwest corner

== Name and history ==
Grand Rapids Township was established in 1888. It is the only Grand Rapids Township statewide.

== Government ==
The township is governed by a three-member board of trustees, who are elected in November of odd-numbered years to a four-year term beginning on the following January 1. Two are elected in the year after the presidential election and one is elected in the year before it. There is also an elected township fiscal officer, who serves a four-year term beginning on April 1 of the year after the election, which is held in November of the year before the presidential election. Vacancies in the fiscal officership or on the board of trustees are filled by the remaining trustees.

The Grand Rapids Township Hall is located at the Grand Rapids Township Fire Department in Grand Rapids on Wapokeneta Road and Third Street.
