= National Register of Historic Places listings in Wood County, Ohio =

Location of Wood County in Ohio

This is a list of the National Register of Historic Places listings in Wood County, Ohio.

This is intended to be a complete list of the properties and districts on the National Register of Historic Places in Wood County, Ohio, United States. The locations of National Register properties and districts for which the latitude and longitude coordinates are included below, may be seen in an online map.

There are 33 properties and districts listed on the National Register in the county, including 1 National Historic Landmark.

This National Park Service list is complete through NPS recent listings posted April 17, 2026.

== Current listings ==
	Name on the Register	Image	Date listed	Location	City or town	Description
1	Boom Town Historic District	Boom Town Historic District	May 8, 1987 (#87000693)	Roughly bounded by W. Wooster, S. Church, N. Grove, N. Maple, and Buttonwood; 41°22′24″N 83°39′20″W	Bowling Green	
2	Dodge Site	Dodge Site	March 29, 1978 (#78002214)	17090 W. River Rd., north of Bowling Green; 41°29′00″N 83°43′46″W	Middleton Township	
3	Eagle Point Colony Historic District	Eagle Point Colony Historic District	September 22, 1983 (#83002068)	Colony Rd., Riverside, Eagle Point, Park, and Forest Drs. 41°36′35″N 83°34′09″W	Rossford	
4	East River Road Historic District I	East River Road Historic District I	November 21, 1976 (#76001551)	29455-30465 E. River Rd. (northern side only), southwest of Rossford; 41°35′11″N 83°35′27″W	Perrysburg Township	
5	East River Road Historic District II	East River Road Historic District II	November 21, 1976 (#76001550)	577 E. Front St. to 28589 E. River Rd. 41°34′00″N 83°37′05″W	Perrysburg and Perrysburg Township	
6	Empire House	Empire House	November 28, 1978 (#78002216)	5535 U.S. Route 20, east of Stony Ridge; 41°30′29″N 83°30′11″W	Troy Township	
7	Floral Hall	Floral Hall	July 27, 1982 (#82003666)	City Park on Conneaut Ave. 41°22′49″N 83°39′32″W	Bowling Green	
8	Edward Ford Plate Glass Company Employee Relations Building	Edward Ford Plate Glass Company Employee Relations Building	August 15, 2016 (#16000600)	140 Dixie Highway; 41°36′52″N 83°33′13″W	Rossford	
9	Fort Meigs	Fort Meigs	August 4, 1969 (#69000151)	1.3 mi (2.1 km) southwest of Perrysburg; 41°33′10″N 83°39′06″W	Perrysburg	
10	Fort Meigs Aboriginal-33WO08-33WO445	Fort Meigs Aboriginal-33WO08-33WO445	February 12, 1998 (#98000042)	1.3 mi (2.1 km) southwest of Perrysburg; 41°33′10″N 83°39′04″W	Perrysburg	
11	William Graham House	William Graham House	March 1, 1984 (#84003812)	7056 Jerry City Rd., southwest of Wayne; 41°15′17″N 83°32′18″W	Portage Township	
12	Heeter-Russo House	Heeter-Russo House	May 29, 1975 (#75001554)	24570 2nd St. 41°24′38″N 83°52′25″W	Grand Rapids	
13	Hood-Simmons House	Hood-Simmons House	December 30, 1974 (#74001652)	202 W. 5th St. 41°33′17″N 83°37′46″W	Perrysburg	
14	R.A. Housley House	R.A. Housley House	August 22, 1996 (#96000932)	24155 Front St. 41°24′45″N 83°51′56″W	Grand Rapids	
15	Indian Hills Site	Indian Hills Site	September 20, 1979 (#79001983)	Atop a promontory above the final bend of Grassy Creek, east of its confluence with the Maumee River; 41°36′24″N 83°33′12″W	Rossford	
16	Interurban Bridge	Interurban Bridge	June 19, 1972 (#72001036)	1 mi (1.6 km) south of Waterville over the Maumee River; 41°29′11″N 83°43′42″W	Middleton Township	Extends into Lucas County
17	Benjamin F. Kerr House	Benjamin F. Kerr House	December 21, 1979 (#79001982)	17605 Beaver St. 41°24′38″N 83°52′06″W	Grand Rapids	
18	MacNichol Site	MacNichol Site	November 24, 1978 (#78002215)	Southwest of Perrysburg along the Maumee River; 41°32′53″N 83°40′02″W	Perrysburg Township	
19	Main Street Historic District	Main Street Historic District	November 28, 1980 (#80003247)	Main and Wooster Sts. 41°22′30″N 83°39′02″W	Bowling Green	
20	North Baltimore Town Hall	North Baltimore Town Hall	October 29, 1981 (#81000453)	207 North Main St. 41°10′59″N 83°40′43″W	North Baltimore	Destroyed in 1985
21	Old Wood County Jail	Old Wood County Jail	December 17, 1969 (#69000152)	240 W. Indiana Ave. 41°33′20″N 83°37′54″W	Perrysburg	
22	Perrysburg Historic District	Perrysburg Historic District	April 14, 1975 (#75001557)	Front St. between E. Boundary St. and W. Boundary Ln., 2nd St. between Pine and Hickory Sts., and 3rd St. at Louisiana Ave.; also roughly the Maumee River frontage from Pine to E. Boundary and the southern side of E. 2nd St. from Locust to Hickory; 41°33′36″N 83°37′48″W	Perrysburg	Second set of addresses represents a boundary increase of June 21, 1990
23	Perrysburg Water Maintenance Building	Perrysburg Water Maintenance Building	May 10, 1990 (#90000754)	130 W. Indiana Ave. 41°33′21″N 83°37′44″W	Perrysburg	
24	Risingsun Town Hall and Opera House	Risingsun Town Hall and Opera House	February 18, 2021 (#100006150)	420 Main St. 41°16′07″N 83°25′30″W	Risingsun	
25	Schaller Memorial Building	Schaller Memorial Building	May 10, 1990 (#90000753)	130 W. Indiana Ave. 41°33′20″N 83°37′44″W	Perrysburg	
26	Edwin H. Simmons House	Edwin H. Simmons House	February 7, 1991 (#90002211)	10302 Fremont Pike, southeast of Perrysburg; 41°32′45″N 83°35′31″W	Perrysburg Township	
27	Spafford House	Spafford House	July 15, 1974 (#74001653)	27338 W. River Rd. 41°32′57″N 83°39′25″W	Perrysburg	
28	Thurston Building	Thurston Building	May 29, 1975 (#75001555)	Front St. 41°24′52″N 83°52′04″W	Grand Rapids	
29	Town Hall	Town Hall	May 27, 1975 (#75001556)	Front St. 41°24′44″N 83°52′10″W	Grand Rapids	
30	U.S. Post Office	U.S. Post Office	March 28, 1979 (#79001980)	305 N. Main St. 41°22′38″N 83°39′06″W	Bowling Green	
31	Wood County Courthouse and Jail	Wood County Courthouse and Jail	June 25, 1974 (#74001651)	200 E. Court St. 41°22′35″N 83°38′54″W	Bowling Green	
32	Wood County Home and Infirmary	Wood County Home and Infirmary	April 16, 1979 (#79001981)	Southeast of Bowling Green at 13660 County Home Rd. 41°21′02″N 83°37′01″W	Portage Township	
33	John J. Yeager House	John J. Yeager House	March 19, 1985 (#85000619)	343 W. Indiana Ave. 41°33′19″N 83°38′02″W	Perrysburg	

== See also ==
- List of National Historic Landmarks in Ohio
- Listings in neighboring counties: Hancock, Henry, Lucas, Ottawa, Putnam, Sandusky, Seneca
- National Register of Historic Places listings in Ohio
