= Cass Township, Ohio =

Cass Township, Ohio, may refer to:

- Cass Township, Hancock County, Ohio
- Cass Township, Muskingum County, Ohio
- Cass Township, Richland County, Ohio
