= Pat Lahey =

American football player (1919–2009)

Profile
- Position: End

Personal information
- Born: October 21, 1919; Dunbridge, Ohio
- Died: October 18, 2009 (aged 89); Northbrook, Illinois
- Listed height: 6 ft 2 in (1.88 m)
- Listed weight: 218 lb (99 kg)

Career information
- College: John Carroll

Career history
- Chicago Rockets (1946-1947)
- Stats at Pro Football Reference

Thomas Patrick Lahey (October 21, 1919 – October 18, 2009) was an American football end.

Lahey was born in Dunbridge, Ohio, and attended Bowling Green High School in Bowling Green, Ohio. He played college football for John Carroll. He also served in the Marine Corps during World War II and played on the 1945 El Toro Flying Marines football team.

He played professional football in the All-America Football Conference for the Chicago Rockets from 1946 to 1947. He appeared in 26 games, 14 as a starter, and caught 30 passes for 351 yards.

Lahey died in Northbrook, Illinois, in 2009.
