= Perry Township, Wood County, Ohio =

Township in Ohio, US

- Township
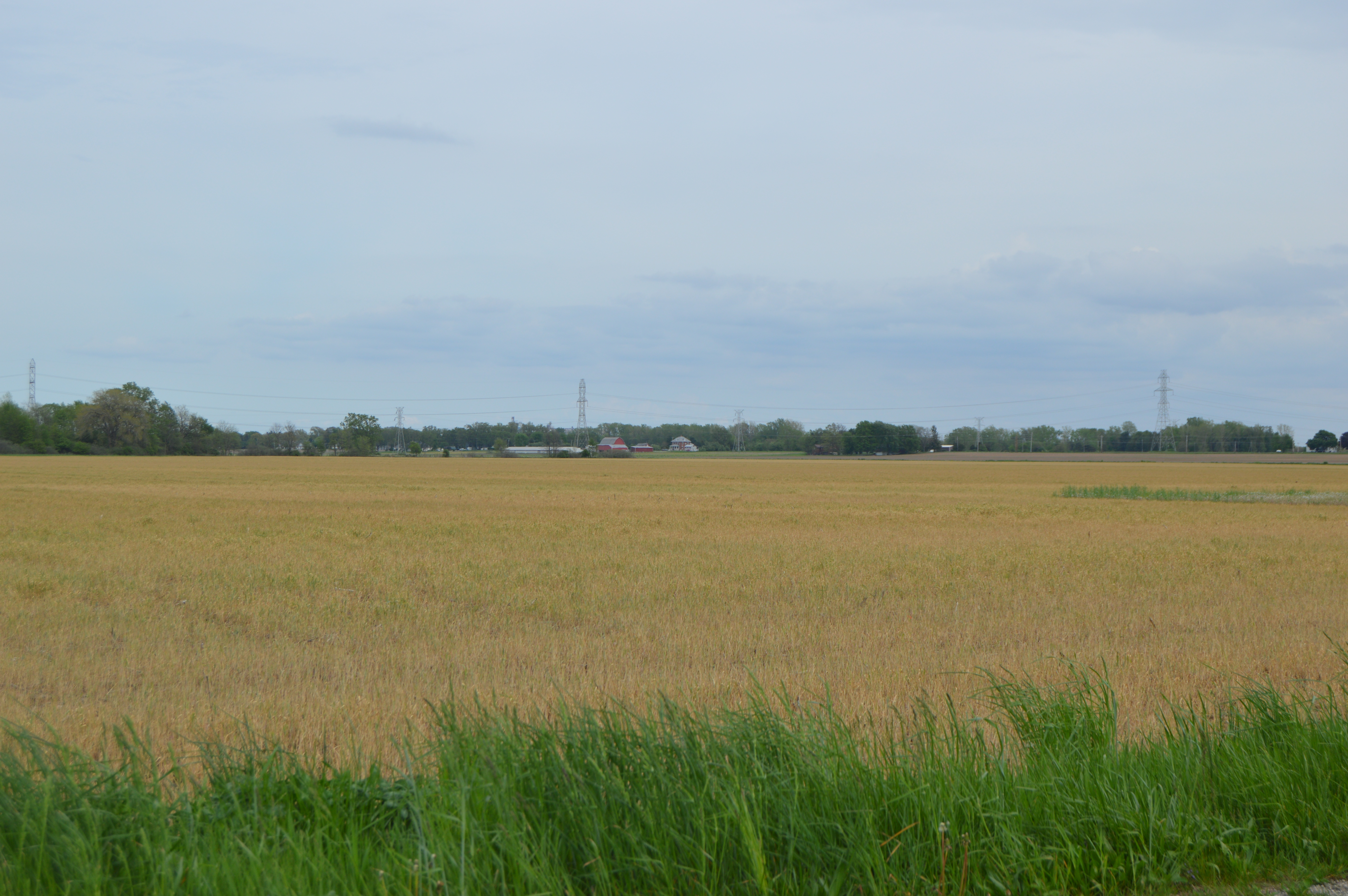
- Fields along England Road, northwest of Fostoria

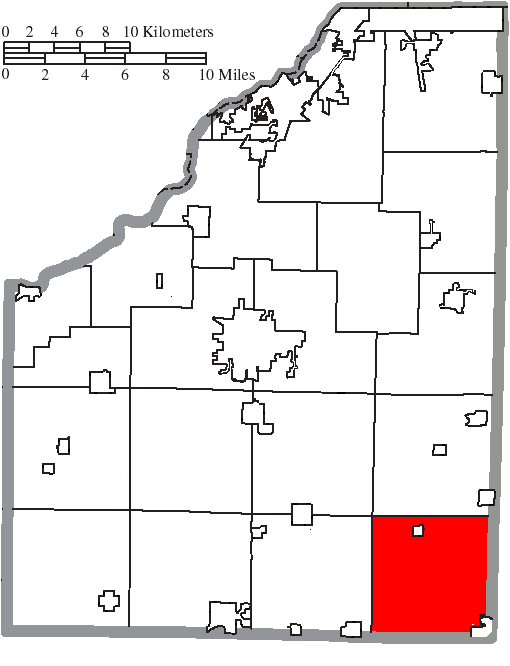
- Location of Perry Township in Wood County
- Coordinates: 41°13′1″N 83°28′14″W
- Country: United States
- State: Ohio
- County: Wood

Area
  - Total: 35.2 sq mi (91.1 km^{2})
  - Land: 35.2 sq mi (91.1 km^{2})
  - Water: 0 sq mi (0.0 km^{2})
- Elevation: 728 ft (222 m)

Population (2020)
  - Total: 1,568
  - Density: 44.6/sq mi (17.2/km^{2})
- Time zone: UTC-5 (Eastern (EST))
  - Summer (DST): UTC-4 (EDT)
- FIPS code: 39-62106
- GNIS feature ID: 1087192

Perry Township is one of the nineteen townships of Wood County, Ohio, United States. The 2020 census found 1,568 people in the township.

== Geography ==
Located in the southeastern corner of the county, it borders the following townships:

- Montgomery Township - north
- Scott Township, Sandusky County - northeast corner
- Jackson Township, Seneca County - east
- Loudon Township, Seneca County - southeast corner
- Washington Township, Hancock County - south
- Cass Township, Hancock County - southwest corner
- Bloom Township - west
- Portage Township - northwest corner

Part of the city of Fostoria is located in southeastern Perry Township, and the village of West Millgrove lies in the township's north.

== Name and history ==
Perry Township was established in 1833. It is one of twenty-six Perry Townships statewide.

== Government ==
The township is governed by a three-member board of trustees, who are elected in November of odd-numbered years to a four-year term beginning on the following January 1. Two are elected in the year after the presidential election and one is elected in the year before it. There is also an elected township fiscal officer, who serves a four-year term beginning on April 1 of the year after the election, which is held in November of the year before the presidential election. Vacancies in the fiscal officership or on the board of trustees are filled by the remaining trustees.
