= Marion Township, Hancock County, Ohio =

Township in Ohio, US

- Township
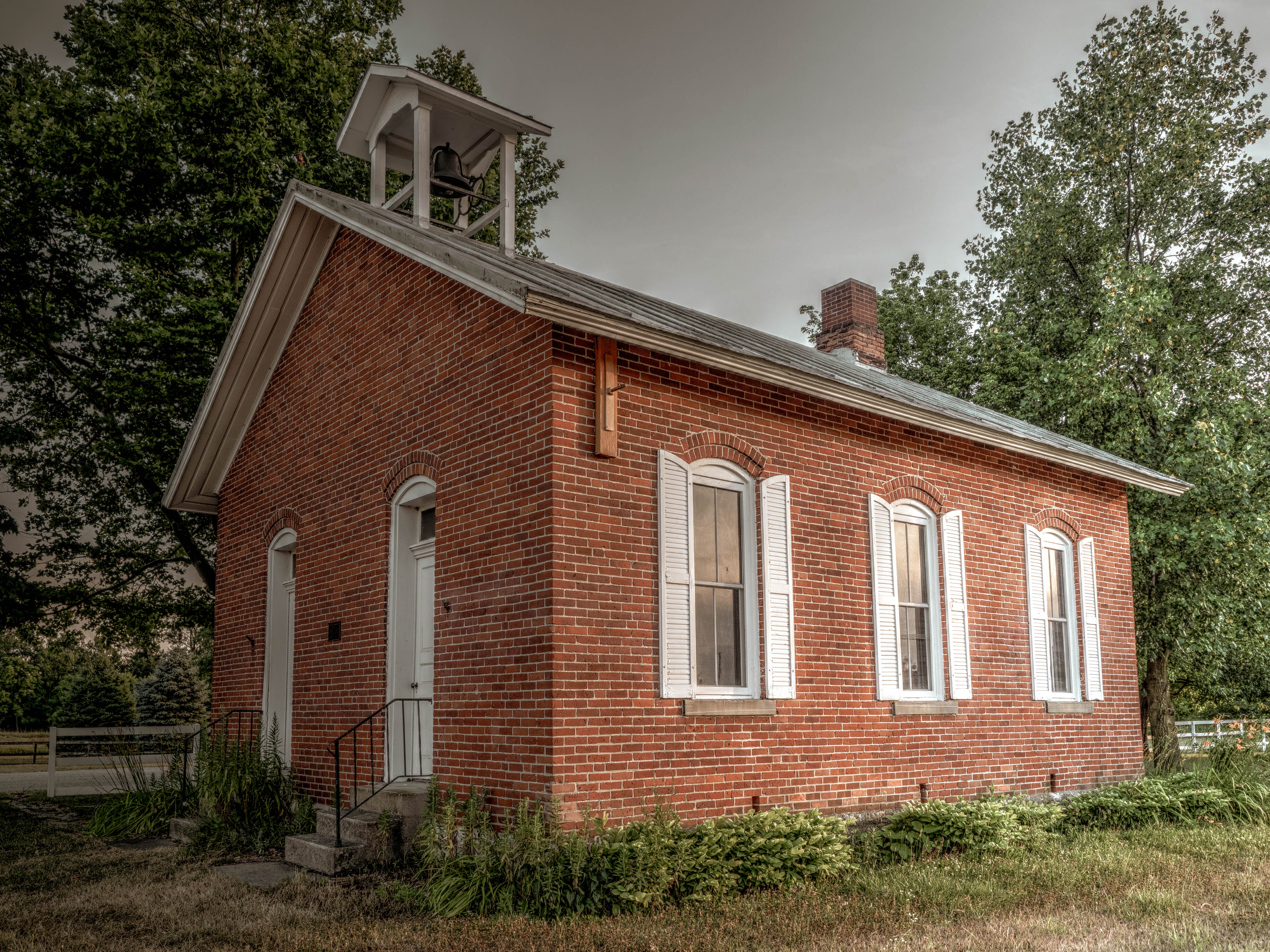
- Former Schoolhouse No. 3

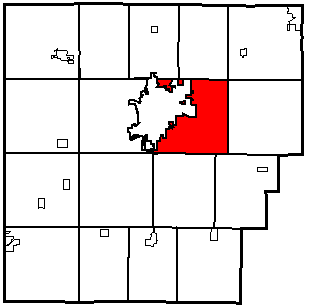
- Location of Marion Township in Hancock County
- Coordinates: 41°2′10″N 83°35′22″W
- Country: United States
- State: Ohio
- County: Hancock

Area
  - Total: 24.5 sq mi (63.4 km^{2})
  - Land: 23.2 sq mi (60.1 km^{2})
  - Water: 1.3 sq mi (3.3 km^{2})
- Elevation: 794 ft (242 m)

Population (2020)
  - Total: 3,097
  - Density: 133/sq mi (51.5/km^{2})
- Time zone: UTC-5 (Eastern (EST))
  - Summer (DST): UTC-4 (EDT)
- FIPS code: 39-47698
- GNIS feature ID: 1086249
- Website: https://mariontwphancock.com/

Marion Township is one of the seventeen townships of Hancock County, Ohio, United States. As of the 2020 census, the population was 3,097.

== Geography ==
Located in the central part of the county, it borders the following municipalities:

- Cass Township - north
- Washington Township - northeast corner
- Biglick Township - east
- Amanda Township - southeast
- Jackson Township - south
- Eagle Township - southwest corner
- City of Findlay - west (the county seat)
- Allen Township - northwest

== Name and history ==
It is one of twelve Marion Townships statewide.

Marion Township was organized in 1833. The township was probably named for Francis Marion, a general in the American Revolutionary War who was also known as the Swamp Fox.

== Government ==
The township is governed by a three-member board of trustees, who are elected in November of odd-numbered years to a four-year term beginning on the following January 1. Two are elected in the year after the presidential election and one is elected in the year before it. There is also an elected township fiscal officer, who serves a four-year term beginning on April 1 of the year after the election, which is held in November of the year before the presidential election. Vacancies in the fiscal officership or on the board of trustees are filled by the remaining trustees.
