= Liberty Township, Wood County, Ohio =

Township in Ohio, US

- Township
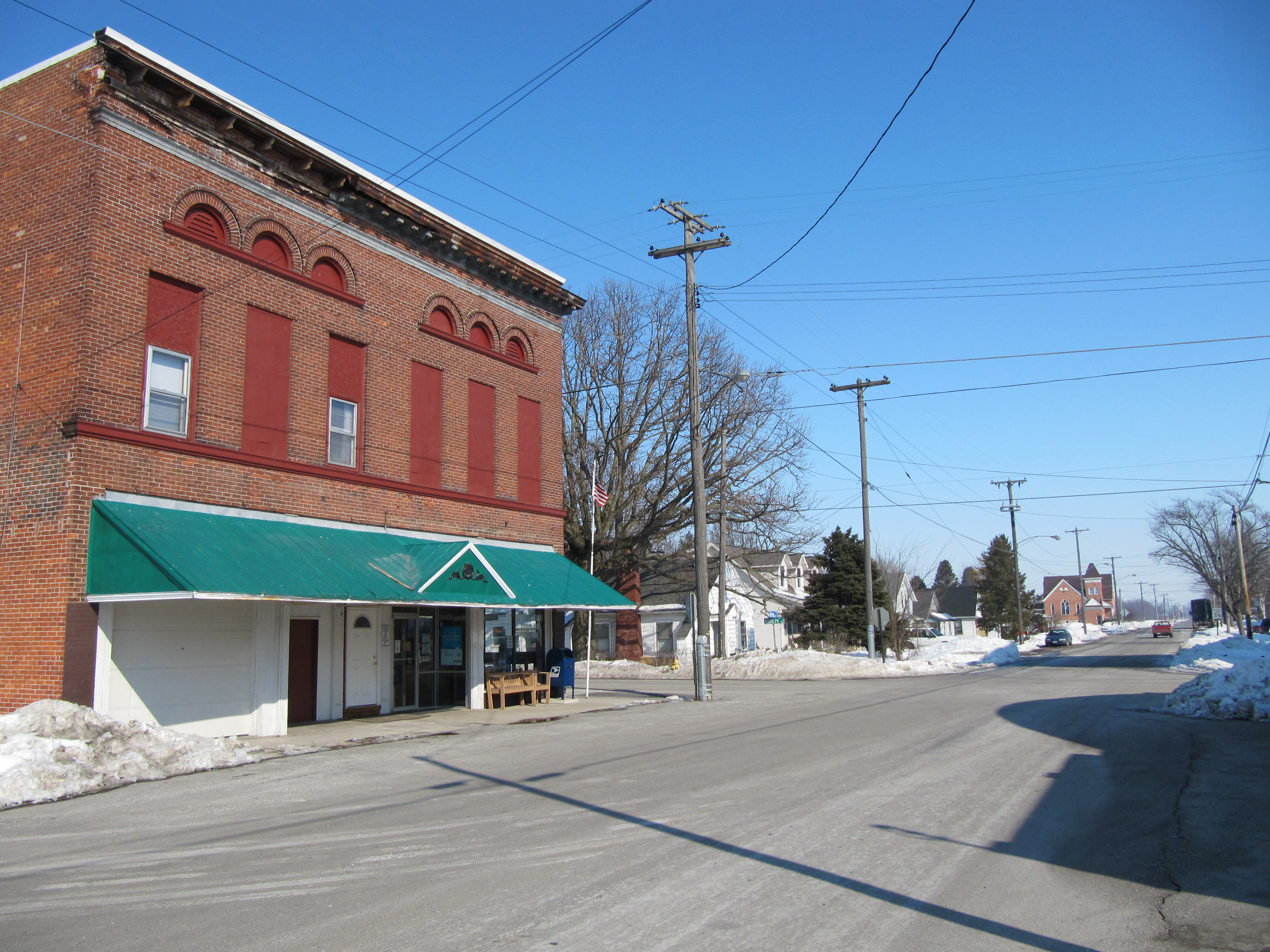
- Main Street in Rudolph

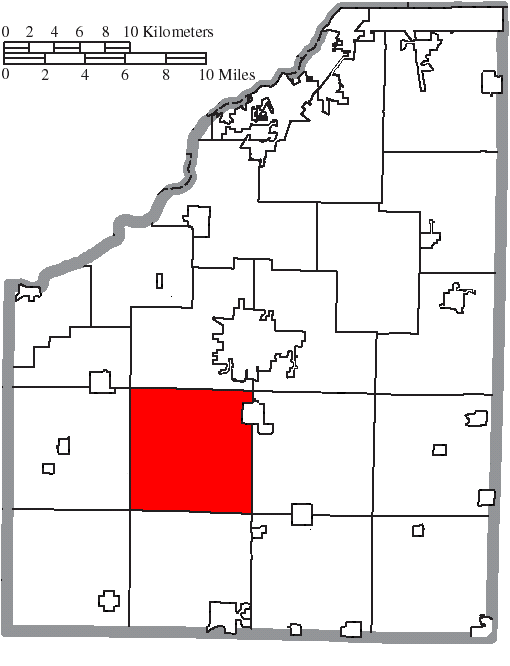
- Location of Liberty Township in Wood County
- Coordinates: 41°17′48″N 83°41′3″W
- Country: United States
- State: Ohio
- County: Wood

Area
  - Total: 36.8 sq mi (95.4 km^{2})
  - Land: 36.8 sq mi (95.2 km^{2})
  - Water: 0.039 sq mi (0.1 km^{2})
- Elevation: 679 ft (207 m)

Population (2020)
  - Total: 1,690
  - Density: 46/sq mi (17.8/km^{2})
- Time zone: UTC-5 (Eastern (EST))
  - Summer (DST): UTC-4 (EDT)
- FIPS code: 39-43400
- GNIS feature ID: 1087187

Liberty Township is one of the nineteen townships of Wood County, Ohio, United States. The 2020 census found 1,690 people in the township.

== Geography ==
Located in the southern part of the county, it borders the following townships:

- Plain Township - north
- Center Township - northeast corner
- Portage Township - east
- Bloom Township - southeast corner
- Henry Township - south
- Jackson Township - southwest corner
- Milton Township - west
- Weston Township - northwest corner

Part of the village of Portage is located in northeastern Liberty Township, and the unincorporated community of Rudolph lies in the township's east.

== Name and history ==
Liberty Township was established in 1835. It is one of twenty-five Liberty Townships statewide.

== Government ==
The township is governed by a three-member board of trustees, who are elected in November of odd-numbered years to a four-year term beginning on the following January 1. Two are elected in the year after the presidential election and one is elected in the year before it. There is also an elected township fiscal officer, who serves a four-year term beginning on April 1 of the year after the election, which is held in November of the year before the presidential election. Vacancies in the fiscal officership or on the board of trustees are filled by the remaining trustees.
