= Center Township, Wood County, Ohio =

Township in Ohio, US

- Township
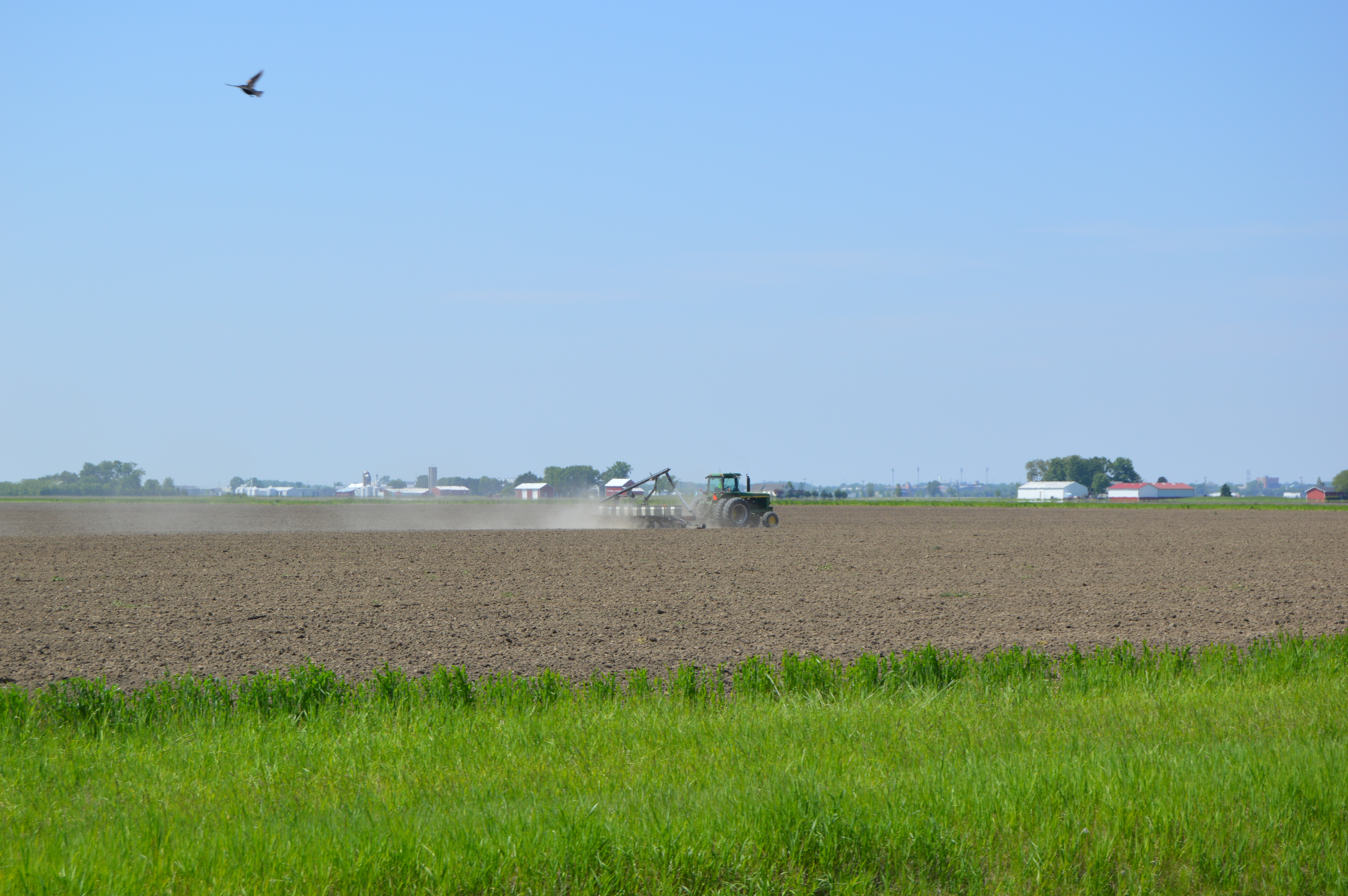
- Agricultural scene on Nelson Road

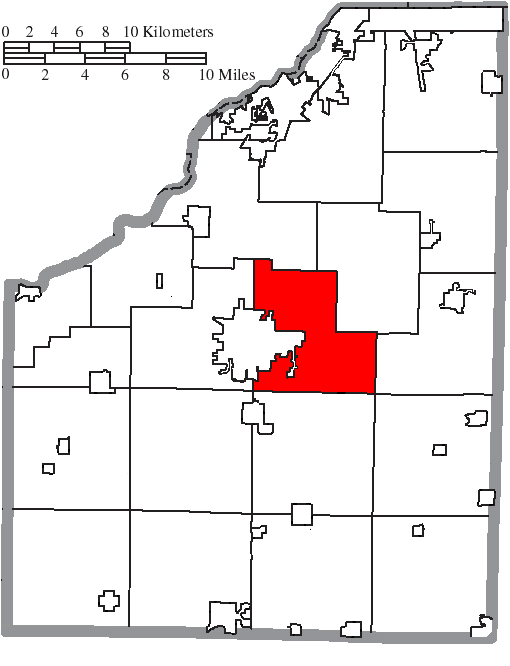
- Location of Center Township in Wood County
- Coordinates: 41°22′40″N 83°35′51″W
- Country: United States
- State: Ohio
- County: Wood

Area
  - Total: 26.4 sq mi (68.3 km^{2})
  - Land: 26.3 sq mi (68.1 km^{2})
  - Water: 0.077 sq mi (0.2 km^{2})
- Elevation: 666 ft (203 m)

Population (2020)
  - Total: 1,140
  - Density: 43/sq mi (16.7/km^{2})
- Time zone: UTC-5 (Eastern (EST))
  - Summer (DST): UTC-4 (EDT)
- FIPS code: 39-13015
- GNIS feature ID: 1087180

Center Township is one of the nineteen townships of Wood County, Ohio, United States. The 2020 census found 1,140 people in the township.

== Geography ==
Located in the center of the county, it borders the following townships:

- Middleton Township - north
- Webster Township - northeast
- Freedom Township - east
- Montgomery Township - southeast corner
- Portage Township - south
- Liberty Township - southwest corner
- Plain Township - west

Much of the city of Bowling Green, the county seat of Wood County, is located in western Center Township.

Center Township is also the location of the Wood County Airport, and of the intersection of I-75 and U.S. Route 6.

== Name and history ==
Center Township was established in 1835. It is one of nine Center Townships statewide.

== Government ==
The township is governed by a three-member board of trustees, who are elected in November of odd-numbered years to a four-year term beginning on the following January 1. Two are elected in the year after the presidential election and one is elected in the year before it. There is also an elected township fiscal officer, who serves a four-year term beginning on April 1 of the year after the election, which is held in November of the year before the presidential election. Vacancies in the fiscal officership or on the board of trustees are filled by the remaining trustees.
