= Biglick Township, Ohio =

Township in Ohio, US

- Township
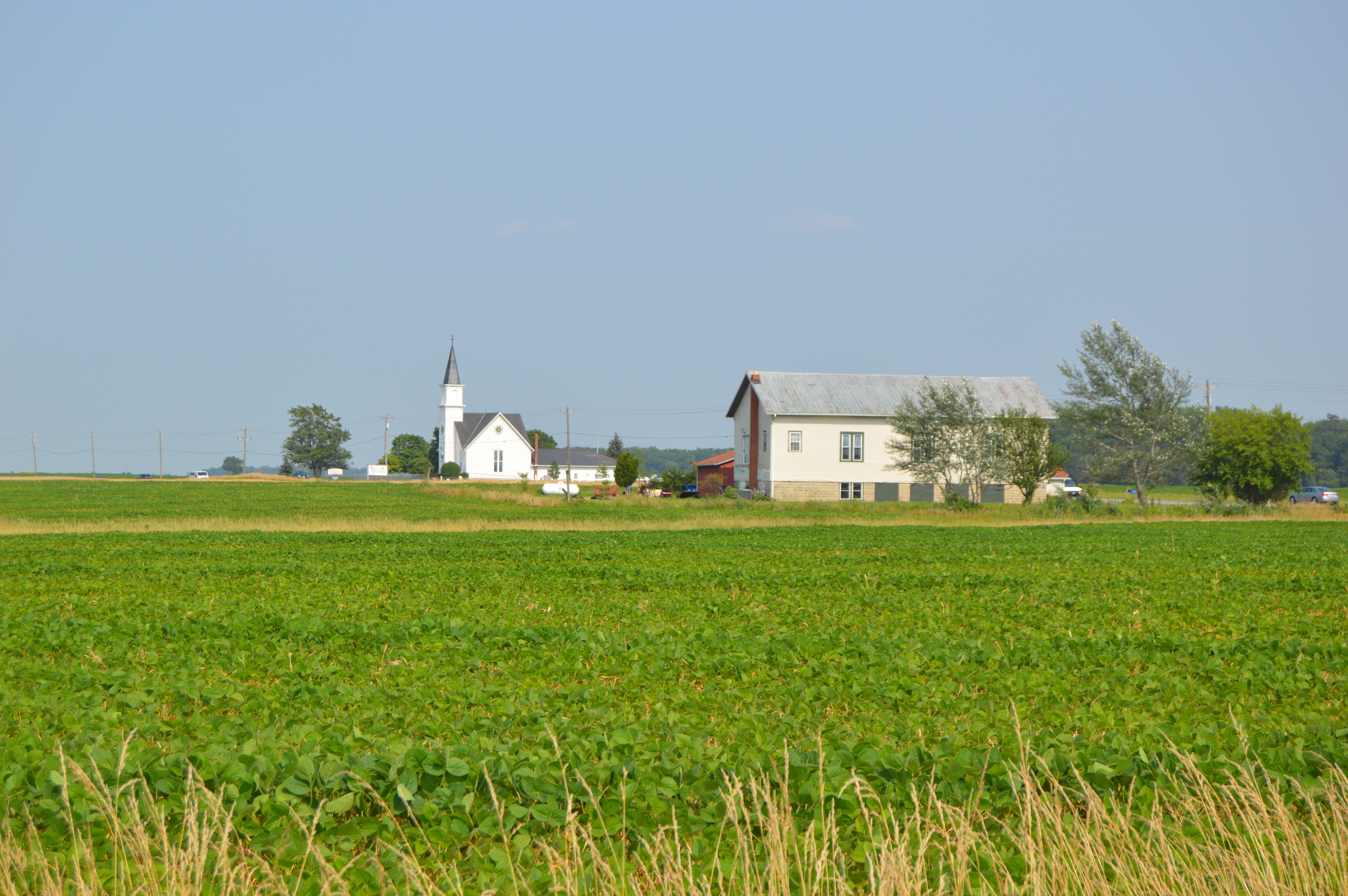
- Scene along U.S. Route 224

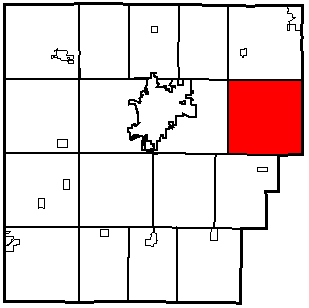
- Location of Biglick Township in Hancock County
- Coordinates: 41°2′21″N 83°29′12″W
- Country: United States
- State: Ohio
- County: Hancock

Area
  - Total: 36.1 sq mi (93.4 km^{2})
  - Land: 36.1 sq mi (93.4 km^{2})
  - Water: 0 sq mi (0.0 km^{2})
- Elevation: 807 ft (246 m)

Population (2020)
  - Total: 1,184
  - Density: 32.8/sq mi (12.7/km^{2})
- Time zone: UTC-5 (Eastern (EST))
  - Summer (DST): UTC-4 (EDT)
- FIPS code: 39-06362
- GNIS feature ID: 1086240

Biglick Township is one of the seventeen townships of Hancock County, Ohio, United States. As of the 2020 census the population was 1,184.

== Geography ==
Located in the eastern part of the county, it borders the following townships:

- Washington Township - north
- Loudon Township, Seneca County - northeast corner
- Big Spring Township, Seneca County - east
- Crawford Township, Wyandot County - southeast corner
- Ridge Township, Wyandot County - south
- Amanda Township - southwest
- Marion Township - west
- Cass Township - northwest corner

No municipalities are located in Biglick Township.

== Name and history ==
The township was named after numerous salt licks that had been present near the center of the township. It is the only Biglick Township statewide.

== Government ==
The township is governed by a three-member board of trustees, who are elected in November of odd-numbered years to a four-year term beginning on the following January 1. Two are elected in the year after the presidential election and one is elected in the year before it. There is also an elected township fiscal officer, who serves a four-year term beginning on April 1 of the year after the election, which is held in November of the year before the presidential election. Vacancies in the fiscal officership or on the board of trustees are filled by the remaining trustees.
