= United States Post Office (Bowling Green, Ohio) =

- U.S. Post Office
- U.S. National Register of Historic Places
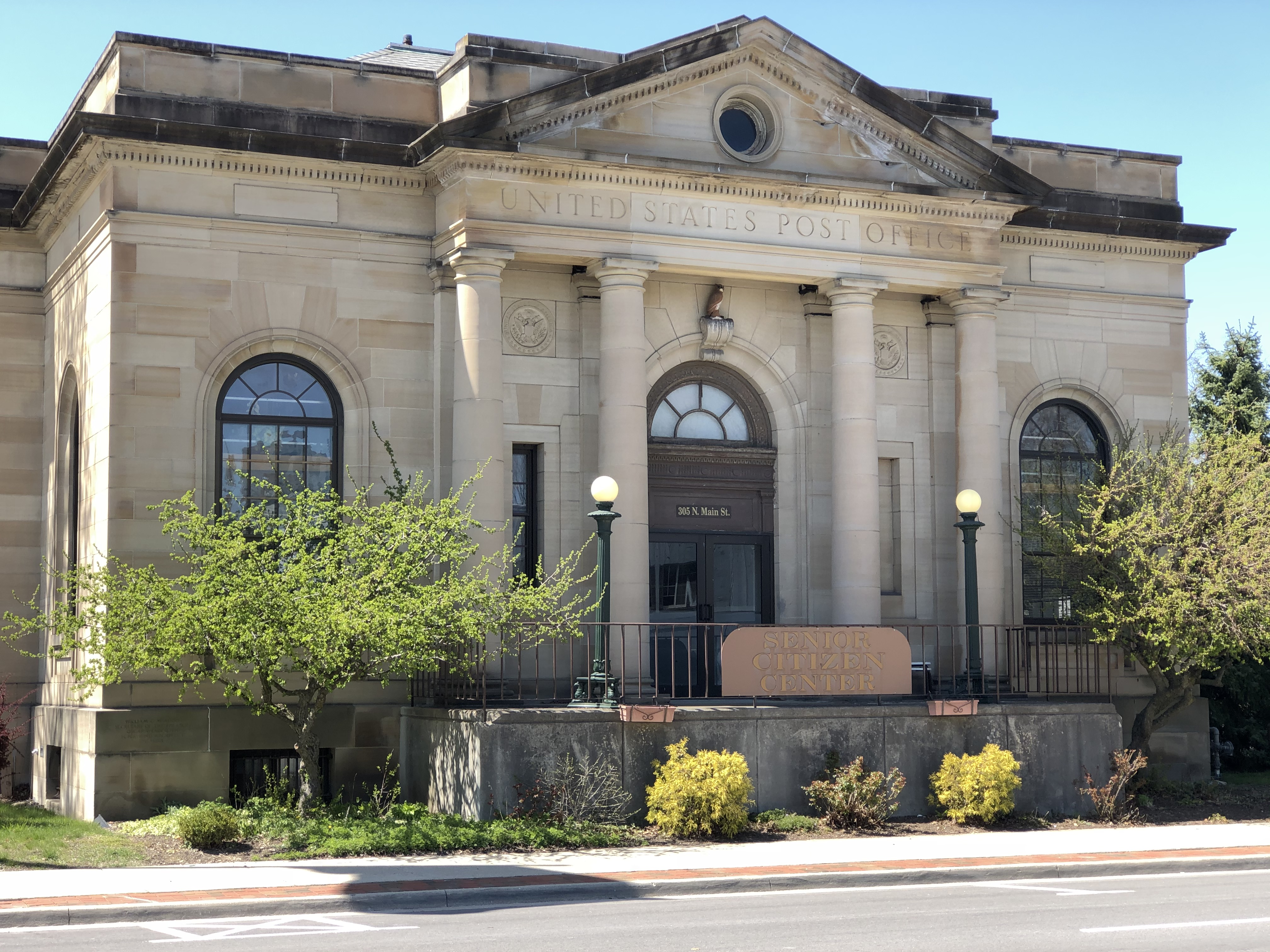
- Front of the post office

- Location within Ohio Location within the United States
- Interactive map showing the location for U.S. Post Office Bowling Green
- Location: 305 N. Main St., Bowling Green, Ohio
- Coordinates: 41°22′38″N 83°39′6″W
- Area: Less than 1 acre (0.40 ha)
- Built: 1913
- Architect: O. Wenderoth; James Devault & Son
- Architectural style: Late 19th And 20th Century Revivals, Classical Revival, Second Renaissance Revival
- NRHP reference No.: 79001980
- Added to NRHP: March 28, 1979

The former Bowling Green Post Office is a historic governmental facility in downtown Bowling Green, Ohio, United States. Constructed in the early twentieth century, this post office features an unusual combination of distinctive architectural styles, and it has been named a historic site.

== Architecture ==
Built in 1913 of brick with an asphalt roof, the post office features substantial amounts of sandstone. Its design, produced under the direction of Oscar Wenderoth, combines prominent elements of two common architectural styles of the early twentieth century. The arched windows display the influence of the Neo-Renaissance style, as do the side quoins and certain details of the portico. Meanwhile, the overall appearance of the facade is clearly Neoclassical, due to details in the portico, the architect's choice of smooth stone for the exterior walls, and the generally symmetrical appearance. One large window sits on either side of the main entrance, which is covered by a four-column portico; the pediment at the top of the portico features a central oculus. The main entrance features a fanlight, an iron frame, and elements in the Corinthian order.

== History ==
Located in downtown Bowling Green, the post office lies at the northern end of the city's main commercial district. As Wood County's leading post office and only substantial federal building, the post office was for many years among the most prominent buildings in the city. The building is no longer used for postal purposes, as the Postal Service moved to another facility in the late 1970s. Since that time, it had served as the Wood County Senior Citizens Center, but even in this new use, it retained its place as a landmark for residents countywide: the Wood County Committee on Aging, which operates numerous centers countywide, used the building as its headquarters.

In 1979, it was listed on the National Register of Historic Places, qualifying because of its distinctive historic architecture. It is one of five National Register-listed sites in the city, along with the Main Street Historic District a short distance to the south, the county courthouse downtown, Floral Hall in a city park, and the Boom Town Historic District on the west side.

In 2020 it was announced that the building would receive a significant change. Preparation for demolition of the building except for the facade began in December 2021.
