= Plain Township, Wood County, Ohio =

Township in Ohio, US

- Township
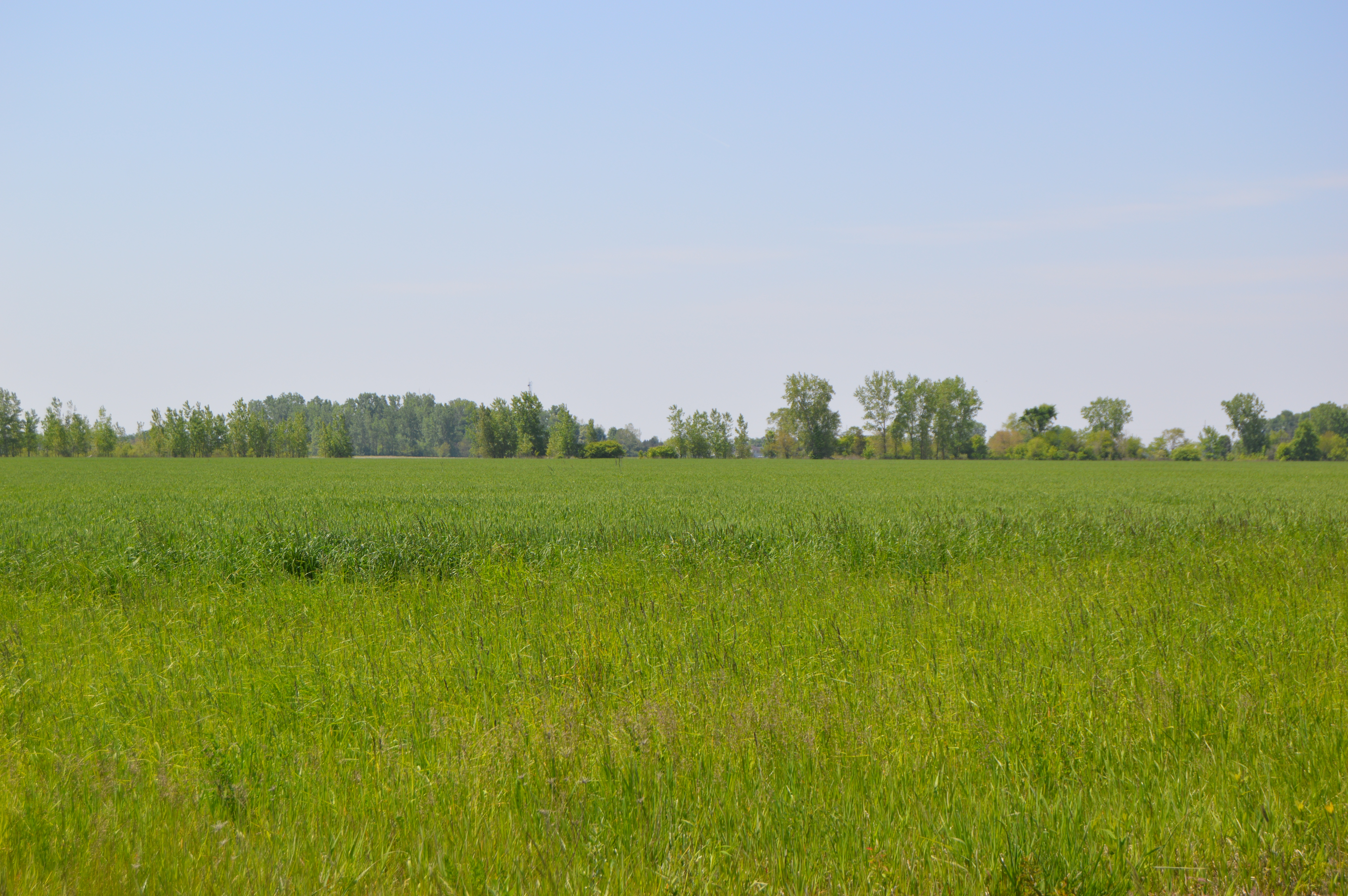
- Wheat fields on Union Hill Road

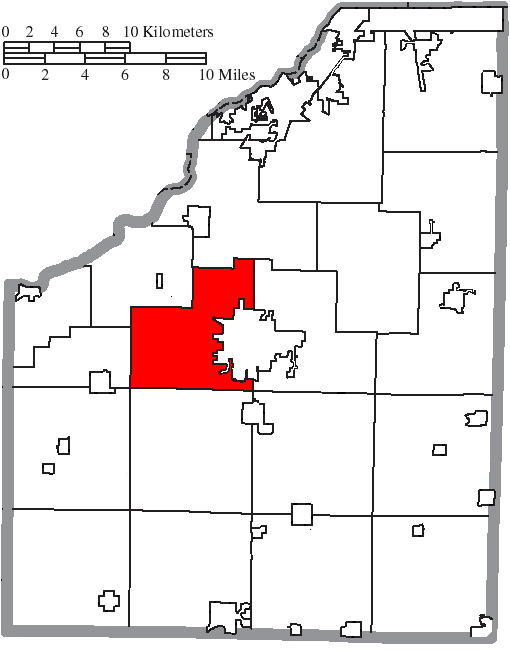
- Location of Plain Township in Wood County
- Coordinates: 41°22′17″N 83°42′37″W
- Country: United States
- State: Ohio
- County: Wood

Area
  - Total: 25.4 sq mi (65.9 km^{2})
  - Land: 25.4 sq mi (65.8 km^{2})
  - Water: 0.039 sq mi (0.1 km^{2})
- Elevation: 676 ft (206 m)

Population (2020)
  - Total: 1,625
  - Density: 64.0/sq mi (24.7/km^{2})
- Time zone: UTC-5 (Eastern (EST))
  - Summer (DST): UTC-4 (EDT)
- FIPS code: 39-63002
- GNIS feature ID: 1087195

Plain Township is one of the nineteen townships of Wood County, Ohio, United States. The 2020 census found 1,625 people in the township.

== Geography ==
Located in the center of the county, it borders the following townships:

- Middleton Township - north
- Center Township - east
- Portage Township - southeast corner
- Liberty Township - south
- Milton Township - southwest corner
- Weston Township - west
- Washington Township - northwest

Part of the city of Bowling Green, the county seat of Wood County, is located in eastern Plain Township.

== Name and history ==
Plain Township was established in 1835. The township was named for the level plains within its borders. Statewide, other Plain Townships are located in Franklin, Stark, and Wayne counties.

== Government ==
The township is governed by a three-member board of trustees, who are elected in November of odd-numbered years to a four-year term beginning on the following January 1. Two are elected in the year after the presidential election and one is elected in the year before it. There is also an elected township fiscal officer, who serves a four-year term beginning on April 1 of the year after the election, which is held in November of the year before the presidential election. Vacancies in the fiscal officership or on the board of trustees are filled by the remaining trustees.
