= Webster Township, Wood County, Ohio =

Township in Ohio, US

Webster Township, Ohio
- Township
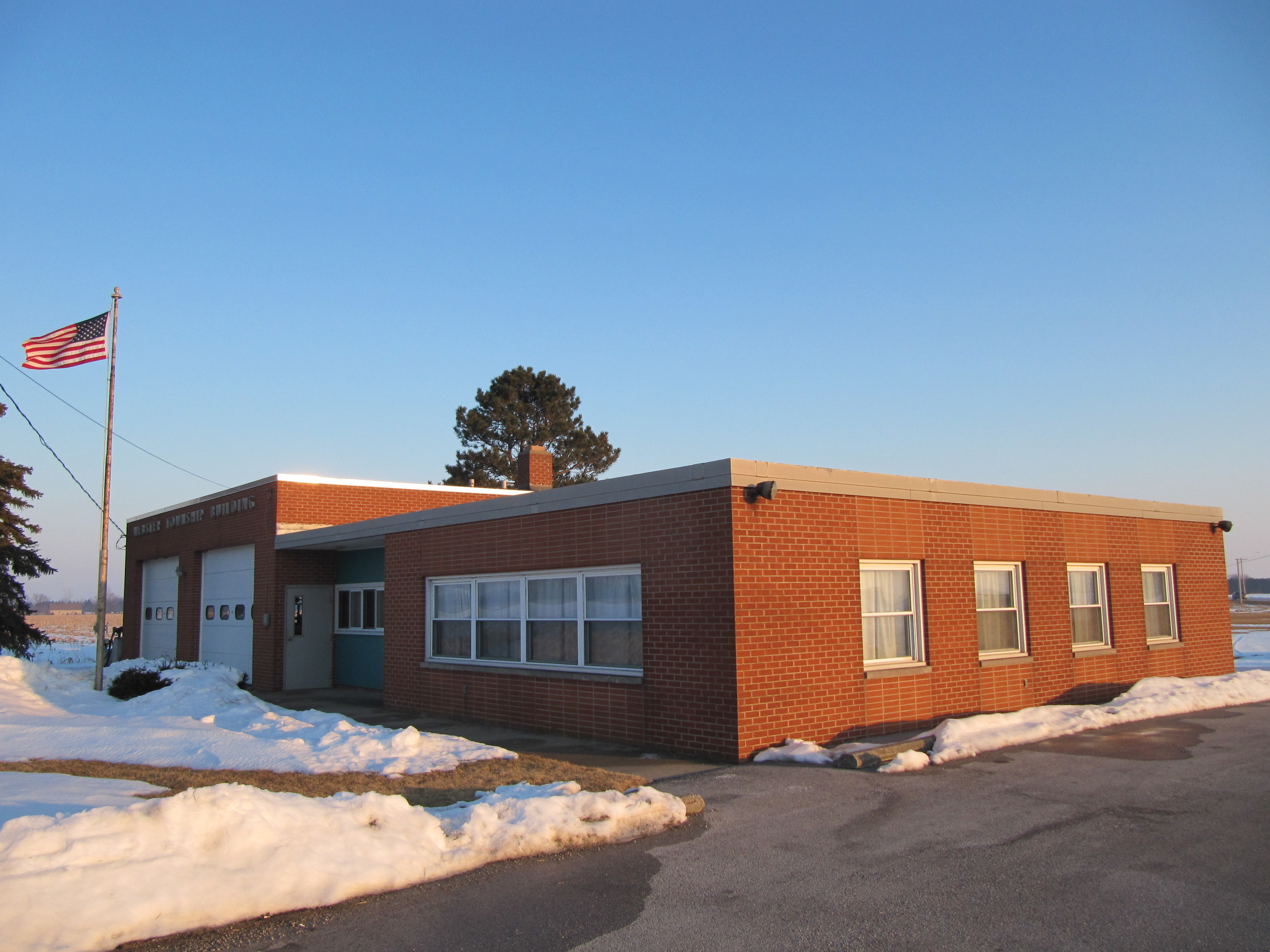
- The Webster Township township building on Sugar Ridge Road at Ohio State Route 199

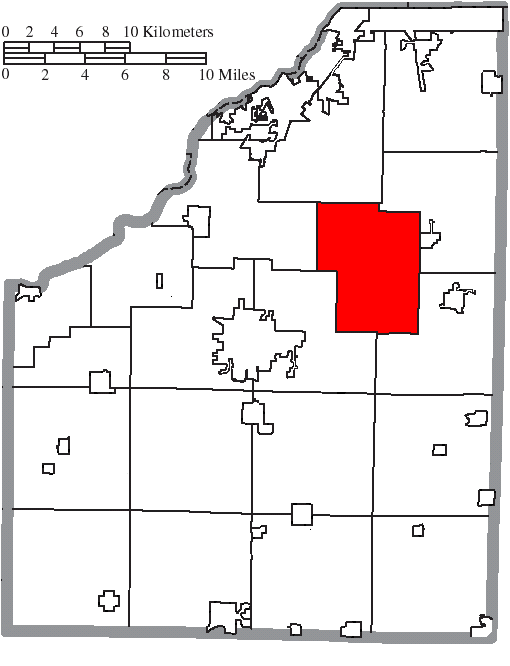
- Location of Webster Township in Wood County
- Coordinates: 41°25′37″N 83°32′7″W
- Country: United States
- State: Ohio
- County: Wood

Area
  - Total: 28.8 sq mi (74.5 km^{2})
  - Land: 28.8 sq mi (74.5 km^{2})
  - Water: 0 sq mi (0.0 km^{2})
- Elevation: 659 ft (201 m)

Population (2020)
  - Total: 1,230
  - Density: 42.8/sq mi (16.5/km^{2})
- Time zone: UTC-5 (Eastern (EST))
  - Summer (DST): UTC-4 (EDT)
- FIPS code: 39-82544
- GNIS feature ID: 1087200

Webster Township is one of the nineteen townships of Wood County, Ohio, United States. The 2020 census found 1,230 people in the township.

== Geography ==
Located in the eastern central part of the county, it borders the following townships:

- Perrysburg Township - north
- Troy Township - northeast
- Freedom Township - southeast
- Center Township - southwest
- Middleton Township - west

No municipalities are located in Webster Township.

== Name and history ==
Webster Township was established in 1846. It is the only Webster Township statewide.

== Government ==
The township is governed by a three-member board of trustees, who are elected in November of odd-numbered years to a four-year term beginning on the following January 1. Two are elected in the year after the presidential election and one is elected in the year before it. There is also an elected township fiscal officer, who serves a four-year term beginning on April 1 of the year after the election, which is held in November of the year before the presidential election. Vacancies in the fiscal officership or on the board of trustees are filled by the remaining trustees.
