= Washington Township, Hancock County, Ohio =

Township in Ohio, US

- Township
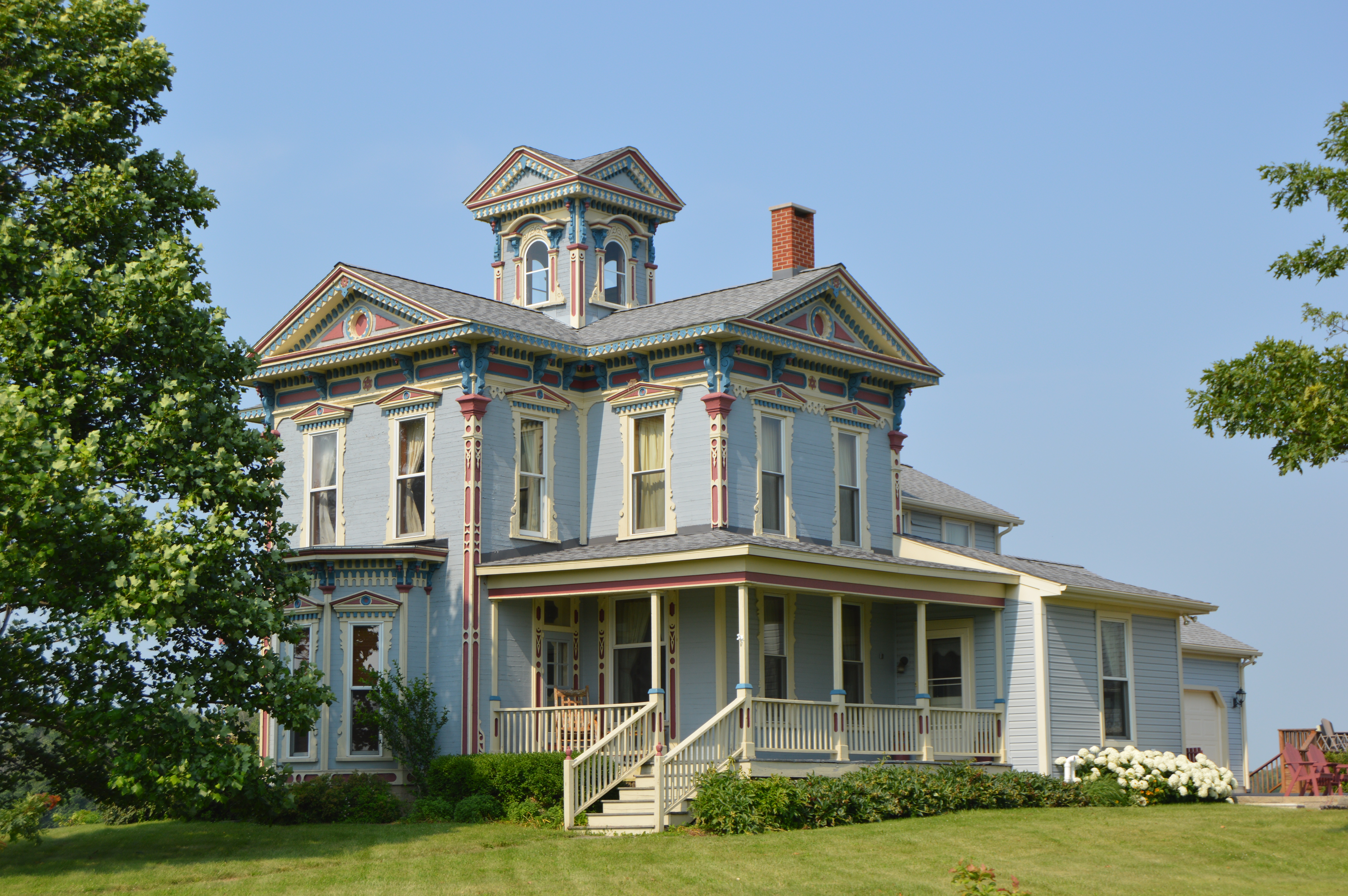
- Farmhouse south of Arcadia

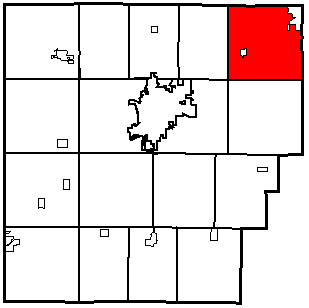
- Location of Washington Township in Hancock County
- Coordinates: 41°8′27″N 83°27′47″W
- Country: United States
- State: Ohio
- County: Hancock

Area
  - Total: 35.80 sq mi (92.71 km^{2})
  - Land: 35.39 sq mi (91.65 km^{2})
  - Water: 0.41 sq mi (1.06 km^{2})
- Elevation: 784 ft (239 m)

Population (2020)
  - Total: 4,353
  - Density: 123.0/sq mi (47.50/km^{2})
- Time zone: UTC-5 (Eastern (EST))
  - Summer (DST): UTC-4 (EDT)
- FIPS code: 39-81284
- GNIS feature ID: 1086255

Washington Township is one of the seventeen townships of Hancock County, Ohio, United States. As of the 2020 census, the population was 4,353.

== Geography ==
Located in the northeastern corner of the county, it borders the following townships:

- Perry Township, Wood County - north
- Jackson Township, Seneca County - northeast corner
- Loudon Township, Seneca County - east
- Big Spring Township, Seneca County - southeast corner
- Biglick Township - south
- Marion Township - southwest corner
- Cass Township - west
- Bloom Township, Wood County - northwest corner

Two municipalities are located in Washington Township: part of the city of Fostoria in the northeast, and the village of Arcadia in the southwest.

== Name and history ==
It is one of forty-three Washington Townships statewide.

Washington Township was organized in 1832. It was named for George Washington, first President of the United States.

== Government ==
The township is governed by a three-member board of trustees, who are elected in November of odd-numbered years to a four-year term beginning on the following January 1. Two are elected in the year after the presidential election and one is elected in the year before it. There is also an elected township fiscal officer, who serves a four-year term beginning on April 1 of the year after the election, which is held in November of the year before the presidential election. Vacancies in the fiscal officership or on the board of trustees are filled by the remaining trustees.
