= Rollersville, Ohio =

Unincorporated community in Ohio, US

- Unincorporated community
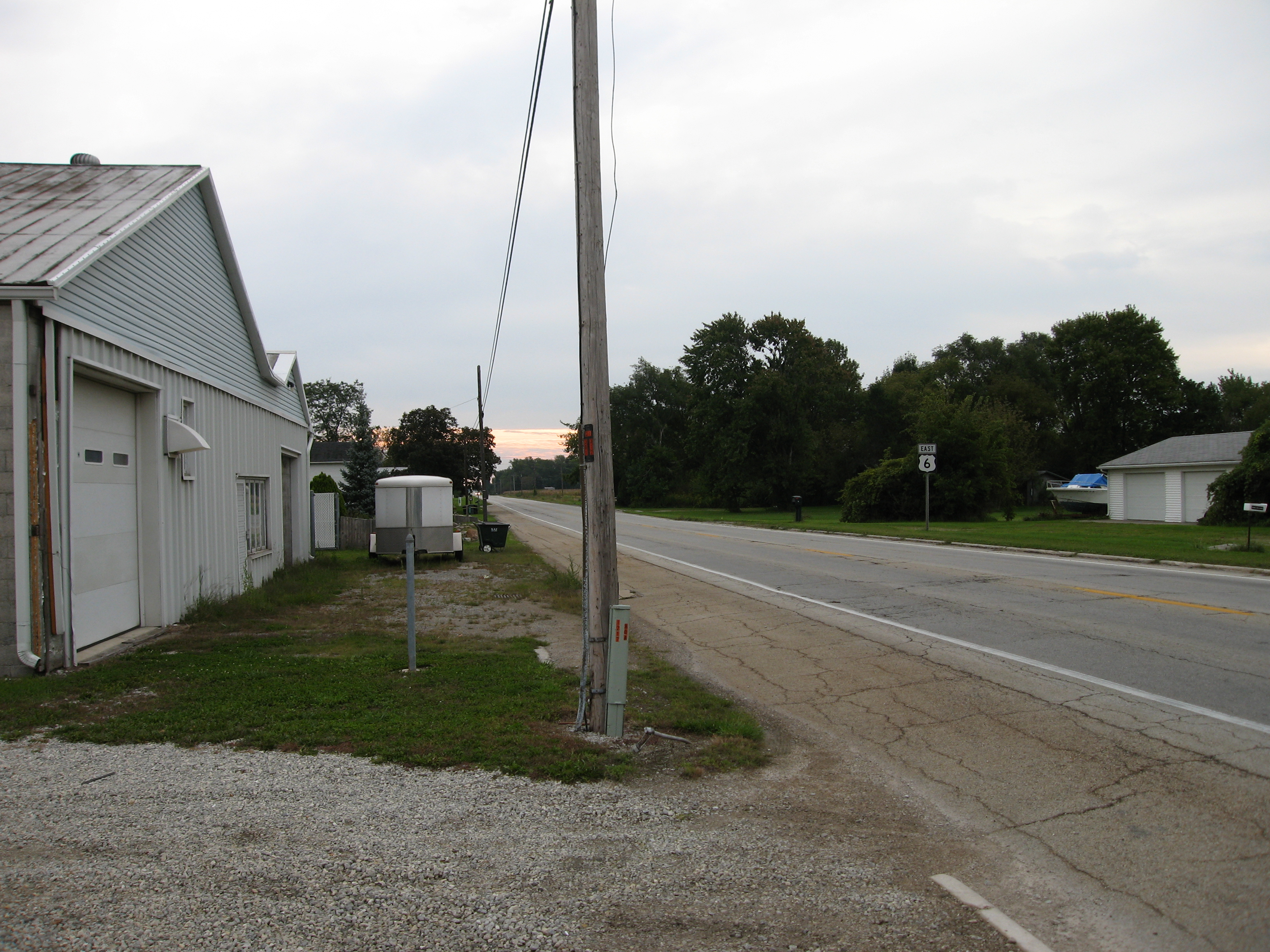
- Rollersville, Ohio is bisected by the Grand Army of the Republic Highway.

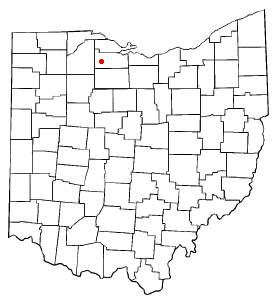
- Location of Rollersville, Ohio
- Coordinates: 41°20′27″N 83°22′42″W
- Country: United States
- State: Ohio
- County: Sandusky
- Elevation: 689 ft (210 m)
- Time zone: UTC-5 (Eastern (EST))
  - Summer (DST): UTC-4 (EDT)
- Area code: 419
- GNIS feature ID: 1065244

Rollersville is an unincorporated community on the border between Madison and Scott townships in Sandusky County, Ohio, United States. It is located on the Grand Army of the Republic Highway (U.S. Route 6), approximately 4.5 miles (7.2 km) west of Helena, Ohio. Rollersville had a post office from 1839 to 1908.

== History ==
A post office called Rollersville was established in 1839, and remained in operation until 1908. The community was named for Henry Roller, a War of 1812 veteran and pioneer settler.
