= Freedom Township, Wood County, Ohio =

Township in Ohio, US

- Township
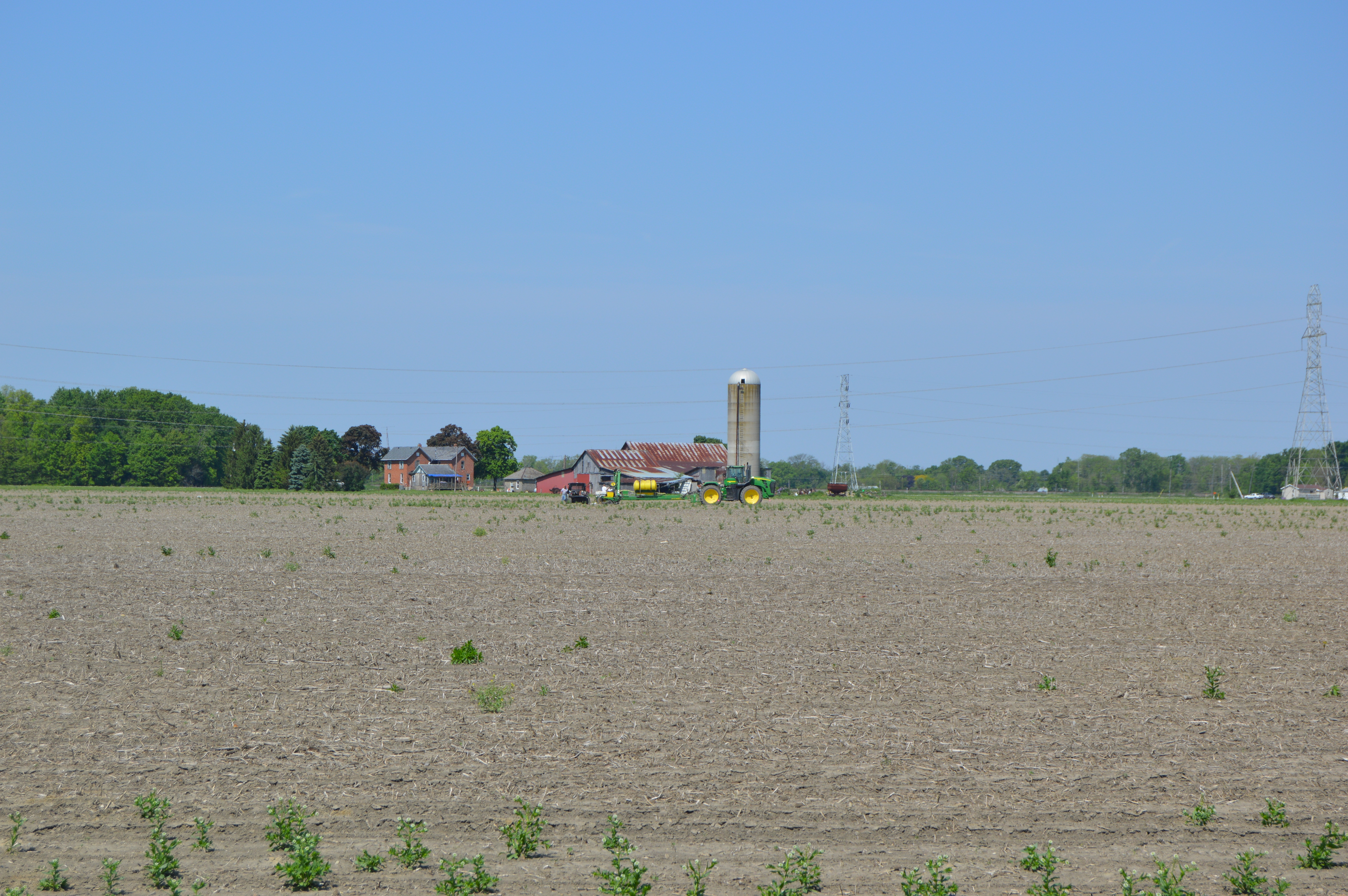
- Fields southeast of Pemberville

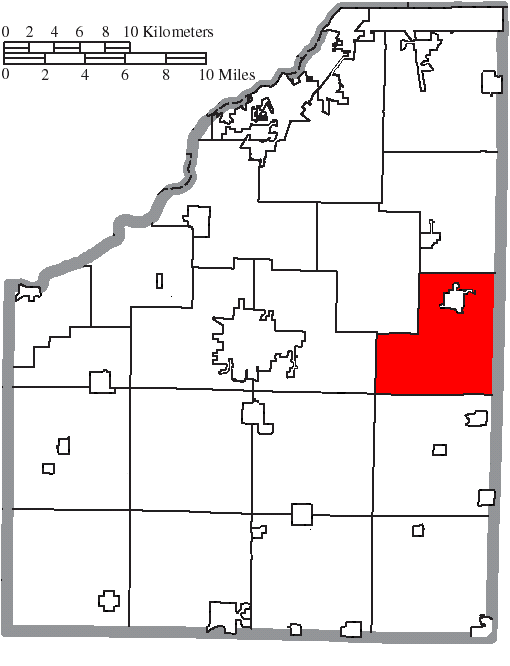
- Location of Freedom Township in Wood County
- Coordinates: 41°23′34″N 83°27′37″W
- Country: United States
- State: Ohio
- County: Wood

Area
  - Total: 30.3 sq mi (78.4 km^{2})
  - Land: 30.3 sq mi (78.4 km^{2})
  - Water: 0 sq mi (0.0 km^{2})
- Elevation: 653 ft (199 m)

Population (2020)
  - Total: 2,644
  - Density: 87.3/sq mi (33.7/km^{2})
- Time zone: UTC-5 (Eastern (EST))
  - Summer (DST): UTC-4 (EDT)
- FIPS code: 39-28756
- GNIS feature ID: 1087182
- Website: https://www.freedomtownship.net/

Freedom Township is one of the nineteen townships of Wood County, Ohio, United States. The 2020 census found 2,644 people in the township.

== Geography ==
Located in the eastern part of the county, it borders the following townships:

- Troy Township - north
- Woodville Township, Sandusky County - northeast
- Madison Township, Sandusky County - east
- Scott Township, Sandusky County - southeast corner
- Montgomery Township - south
- Portage Township - southwest corner
- Center Township - west
- Webster Township - northwest

The village of Pemberville is located in northern Freedom Township.

== Name and history ==
Freedom Township was established in 1831. The township was named for the American ideal of liberty. Statewide, other Freedom Townships are located in Henry and Portage counties.

== Government ==
The township is governed by a three-member board of trustees, who are elected in November of odd-numbered years to a four-year term beginning on the following January 1. Two are elected in the year after the presidential election and one is elected in the year before it. There is also an elected township fiscal officer, who serves a four-year term beginning on April 1 of the year after the election, which is held in November of the year before the presidential election. Vacancies in the fiscal officership or on the board of trustees are filled by the remaining trustees.

The Freedom Township House is located in Pemberville at the intersection of State Route 105 and Water Street.
