= Madison Township, Sandusky County, Ohio =

Township in Ohio, US

- Township
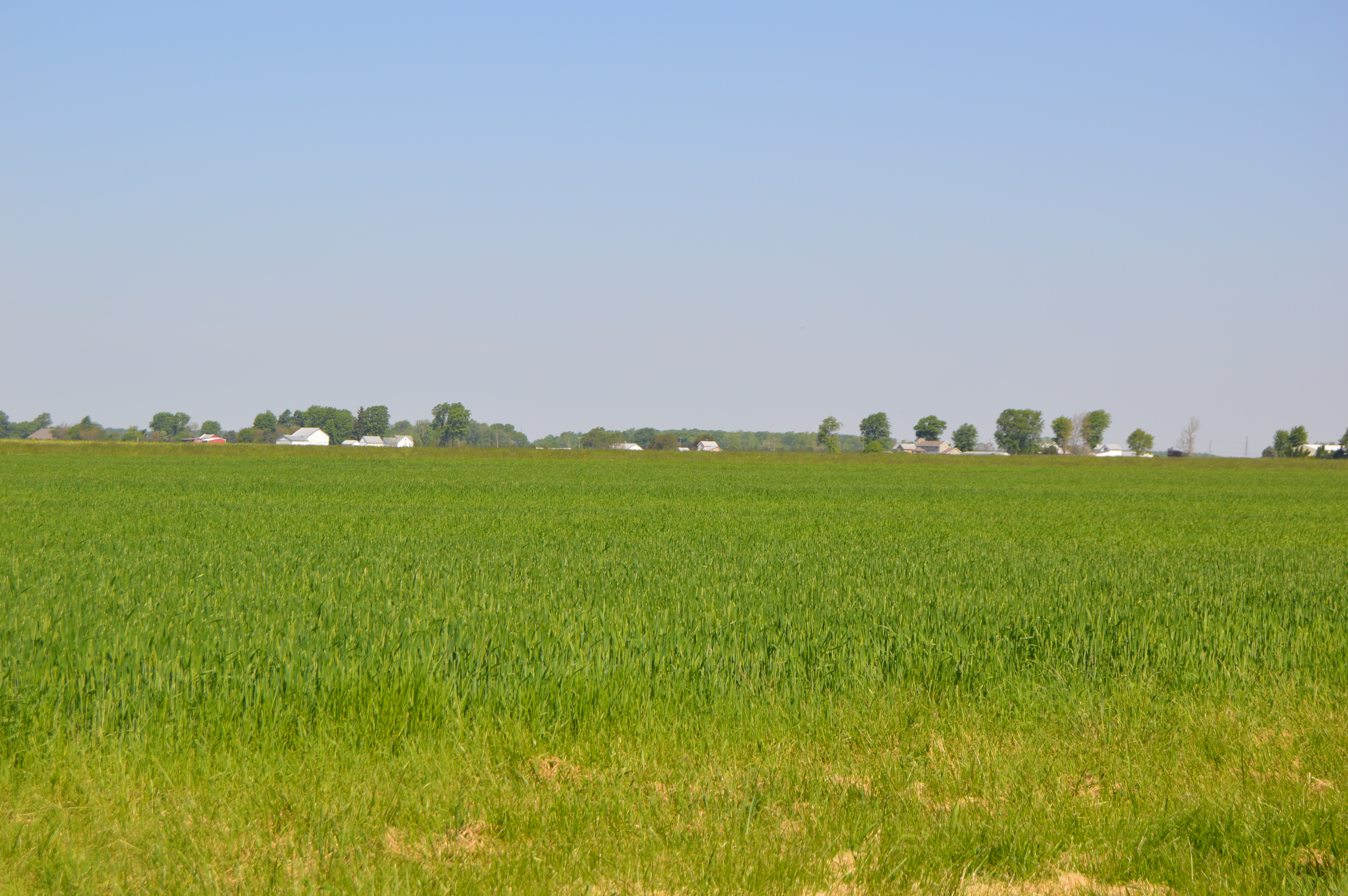
- Fields east of Rollersville

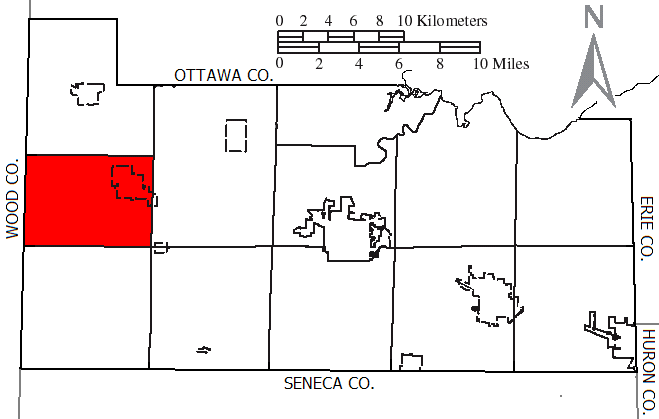
- Location of Madison Township, Sandusky County, Ohio.
- Coordinates: 41°23′3″N 83°20′15″W
- Country: United States
- State: Ohio
- County: Sandusky

Area
  - Total: 27.3 sq mi (70.6 km^{2})
  - Land: 27.2 sq mi (70.5 km^{2})
  - Water: 0.077 sq mi (0.2 km^{2})
- Elevation: 679 ft (207 m)

Population (2020)
  - Total: 3,587
  - Density: 132/sq mi (50.9/km^{2})
- Time zone: UTC-5 (Eastern (EST))
  - Summer (DST): UTC-4 (EDT)
- FIPS code: 39-46592
- GNIS feature ID: 1086913

Madison Township is one of the twelve townships of Sandusky County, Ohio, United States. As of the 2020 census, 3,587 people lived in the township.

== Geography ==
Located in the western part of the county, it borders the following townships:

- Woodville Township - north
- Washington Township - east
- Jackson Township - southeast corner
- Scott Township - south
- Montgomery Township, Wood County - southwest corner
- Freedom Township, Wood County - west

Most of the village of Gibsonburg is located in eastern Madison Township, with the unincorporated community of Rollersville straddling the southern border with Scott Township.

== Name and history ==
Madison Township was named for President James Madison.

It is one of twenty Madison Townships statewide.

== Government ==
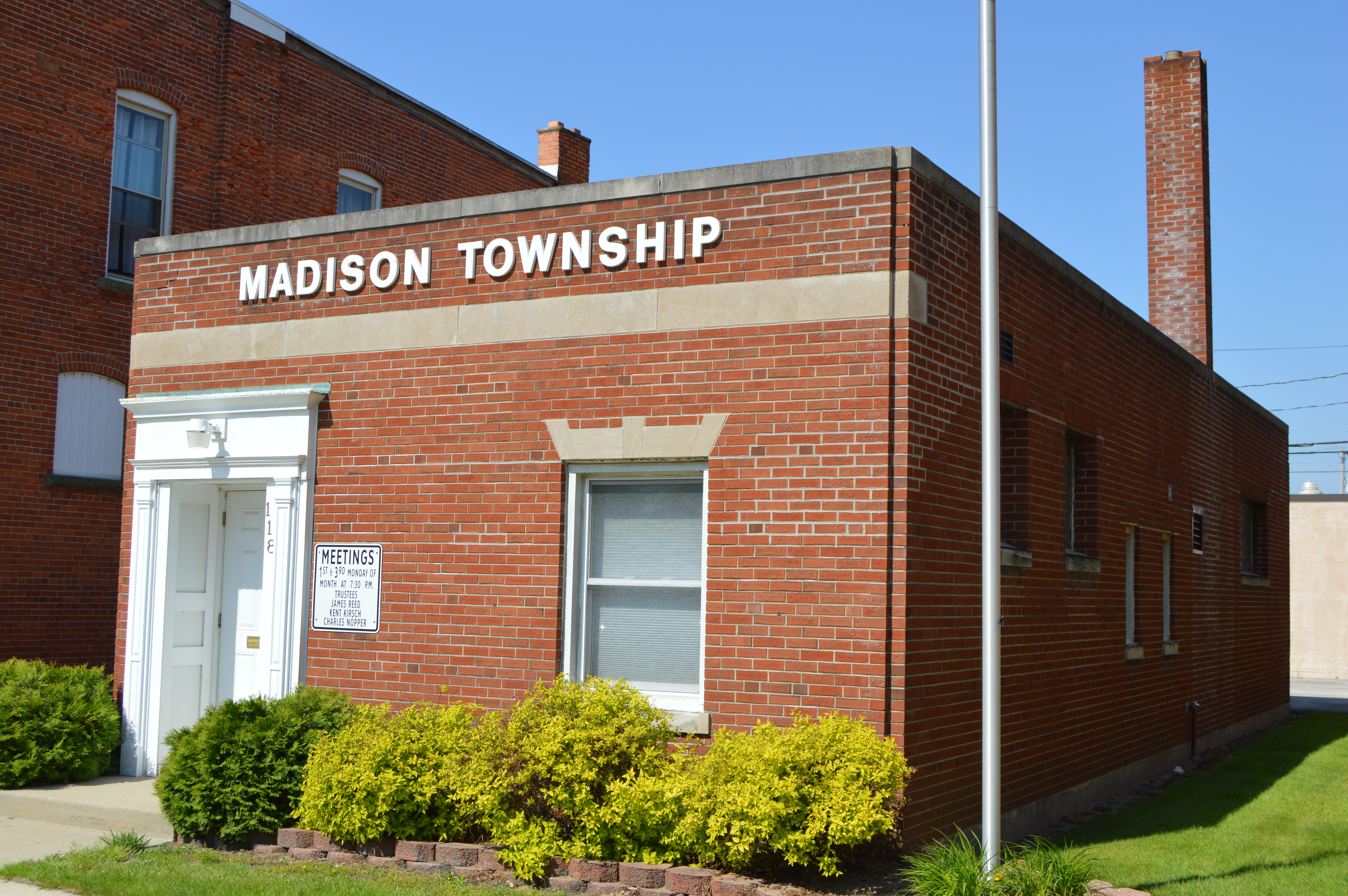
Madison Township hall in Gibsonburg

The township is governed by a three-member board of trustees, who are elected in November of odd-numbered years to a four-year term beginning on the following January 1. Two are elected in the year after the presidential election and one is elected in the year before it. There is also an elected township fiscal officer, who serves a four-year term beginning on April 1 of the year after the election, which is held in November of the year before the presidential election. Vacancies in the fiscal officership or on the board of trustees are filled by the remaining trustees.
