= Scott Township, Sandusky County, Ohio =

Township in Ohio, US

- Township
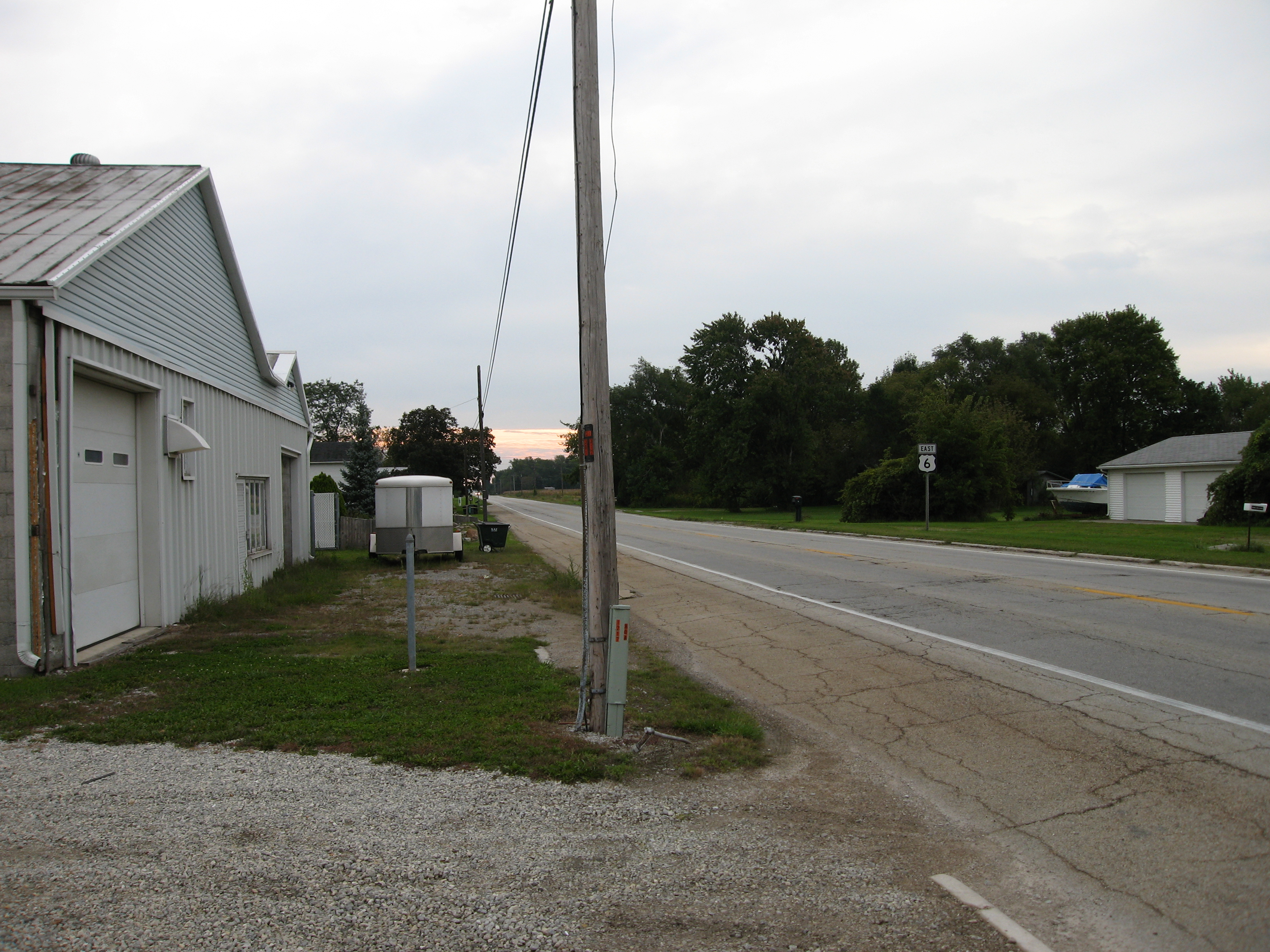
- Township border scene in Rollersville

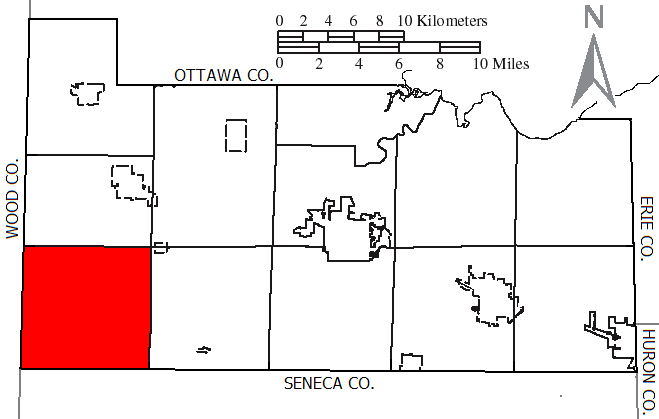
- Location of Scott Township, Sandusky County, Ohio.
- Coordinates: 41°17′41″N 83°22′8″W
- Country: United States
- State: Ohio
- County: Sandusky

Area
  - Total: 36.4 sq mi (94.2 km^{2})
  - Land: 36.4 sq mi (94.2 km^{2})
  - Water: 0 sq mi (0.0 km^{2})
- Elevation: 705 ft (215 m)

Population (2020)
  - Total: 1,333
  - Density: 36.7/sq mi (14.2/km^{2})
- Time zone: UTC-5 (Eastern (EST))
  - Summer (DST): UTC-4 (EDT)
- FIPS code: 39-71087
- GNIS feature ID: 1086917

Scott Township is one of the twelve townships of Sandusky County, Ohio, United States. As of the 2020 census, 1,333 people lived in the township.

== Geography ==
Located in the southeastern corner of the county, it borders the following townships:

- Madison Township - north
- Washington Township - northeast corner
- Jackson Township - east
- Liberty Township, Seneca County - southeast corner
- Jackson Township, Seneca County - south
- Perry Township, Wood County - southwest corner
- Montgomery Township, Wood County - west
- Freedom Township, Wood County - northwest corner

No municipalities are located in Scott Township, however, the unincorporated community of Rollersville straddles the northern border with Madison Township.

== Name and history ==
Scott Township was established in 1833. It was named for Merritt Scott, a pioneer settler.

Statewide, other Scott Townships are located in Adams, Brown, and Marion Counties.

== Government ==
The township is governed by a three-member board of trustees, who are elected in November of odd-numbered years to a four-year term beginning on the following January 1. Two are elected in the year after the presidential election and one is elected in the year before it. There is also an elected township fiscal officer, who serves a four-year term beginning on April 1 of the year after the election, which is held in November of the year before the presidential election. Vacancies in the fiscal officership or on the board of trustees are filled by the remaining trustees.
