= Montgomery Township, Wood County, Ohio =

Township in Ohio, US

- Township
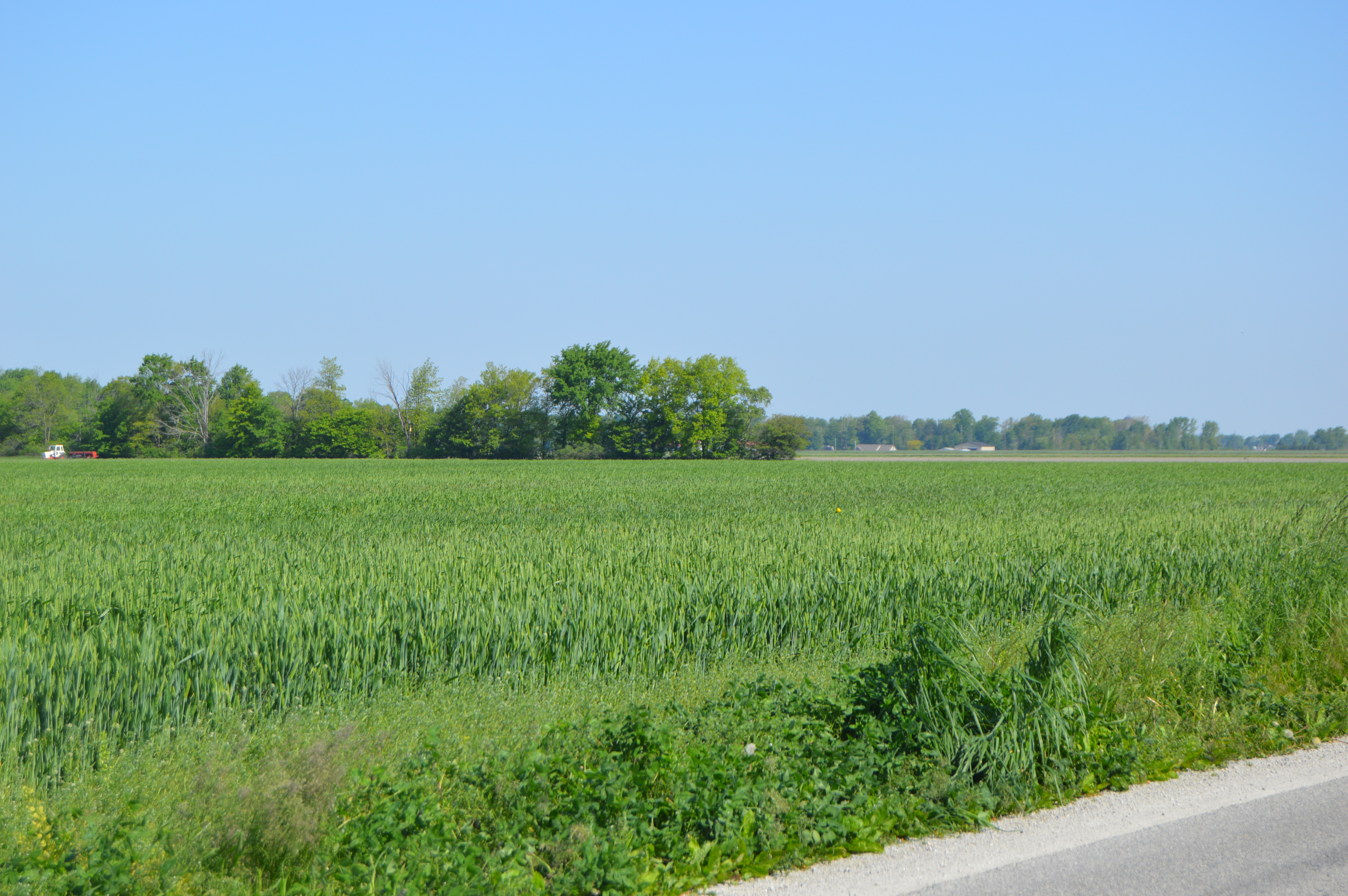
- Fields west of Risingsun

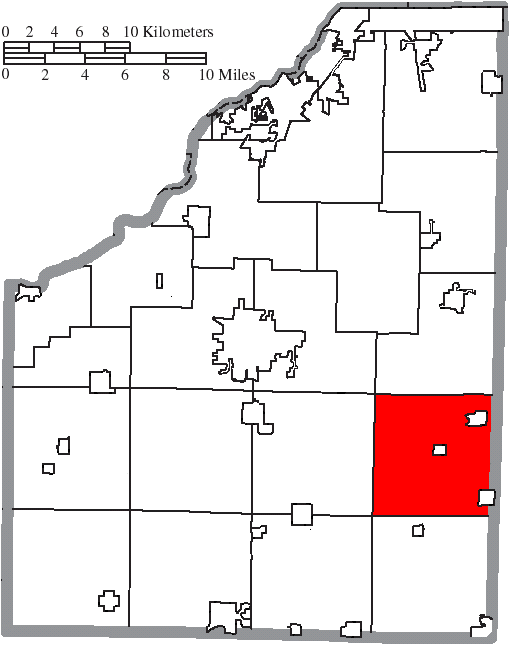
- Location of Montgomery Township in Wood County
- Coordinates: 41°17′48″N 83°27′36″W
- Country: United States
- State: Ohio
- County: Wood

Area
  - Total: 36.4 sq mi (94.2 km^{2})
  - Land: 36.4 sq mi (94.2 km^{2})
  - Water: 0 sq mi (0.0 km^{2})
- Elevation: 692 ft (211 m)

Population (2020)
  - Total: 4,157
  - Density: 114/sq mi (44.1/km^{2})
- Time zone: UTC-5 (Eastern (EST))
  - Summer (DST): UTC-4 (EDT)
- FIPS code: 39-51744
- GNIS feature ID: 1087190

Montgomery Township is one of the nineteen townships of Wood County, Ohio, United States. The 2020 census found 4,157 people in the township.

== Geography ==
Located in the eastern part of the county, it borders the following townships:

- Freedom Township - north
- Madison Township, Sandusky County - northeast corner
- Scott Township, Sandusky County - east
- Jackson Township, Seneca County - southeast corner
- Perry Township - south
- Bloom Township - southwest corner
- Portage Township - west
- Center Township - northwest corner

Three villages are located in Montgomery Township:

- Bradner in the northeast.
- Risingsun in the southeast.
- Wayne in the center.

== Name and history ==
Montgomery Township was established in 1834. Statewide, other Montgomery Townships are located in Ashland and Marion counties.

== Government ==
The township is governed by a three-member board of trustees, who are elected in November of odd-numbered years to a four-year term beginning on the following January 1. Two are elected in the year after the presidential election and one is elected in the year before it. There is also an elected township fiscal officer, who serves a four-year term beginning on April 1 of the year after the election, which is held in November of the year before the presidential election. Vacancies in the fiscal officership or on the board of trustees are filled by the remaining trustees.

The Montgomery Township Hall is located on the corner of Mermill Road at Bradner Road.
