= Bloom Township, Wood County, Ohio =

Township in Ohio, US

- Township
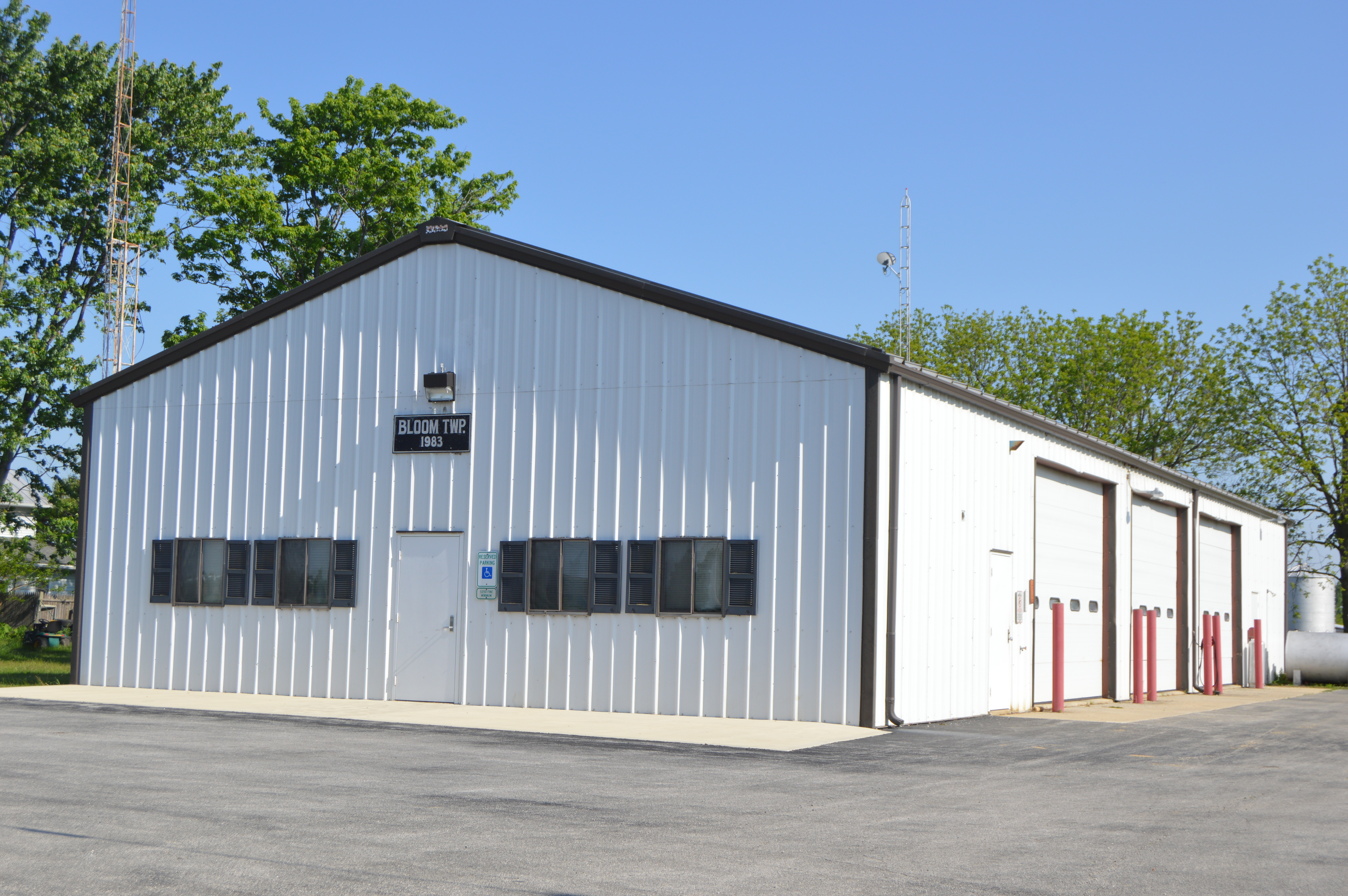
- Township hall at Bloom Center

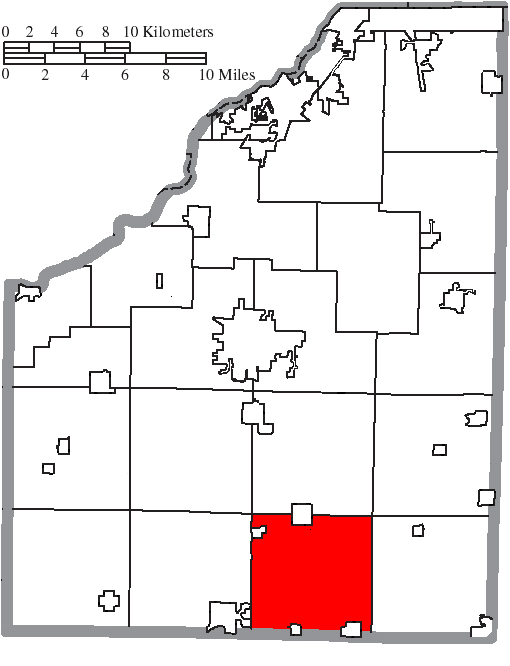
- Location of Bloom Township in Wood County
- Coordinates: 41°12′23″N 83°36′6″W
- Country: United States
- State: Ohio
- County: Wood

Area
  - Total: 35.6 sq mi (92.3 km^{2})
  - Land: 35.6 sq mi (92.2 km^{2})
  - Water: 0.039 sq mi (0.1 km^{2})
- Elevation: 715 ft (218 m)

Population (2020)
  - Total: 2,513
  - Density: 71/sq mi (27.3/km^{2})
- Time zone: UTC-5 (Eastern (EST))
  - Summer (DST): UTC-4 (EDT)
- FIPS code: 39-07020
- GNIS feature ID: 1087178

Bloom Township is one of the nineteen townships of Wood County, Ohio, United States. The 2020 census found 2,513 people living in the township.

== Geography ==
Located in the southern part of the county, it borders the following townships:

- Portage Township - north
- Montgomery Township - northeast corner
- Perry Township - east
- Washington Township, Hancock County - southeast corner
- Cass Township, Hancock County - south
- Allen Township, Hancock County - southwest
- Henry Township - west
- Liberty Township - northwest corner

Several villages are located in Bloom Township:

- Bairdstown, in the south
- Bloomdale, in the southeast
- Cygnet, in the northwest
- Part of Jerry City, in the north

== Name and history ==
Bloom Township was established in 1835. Statewide, other Bloom Townships are located in Fairfield, Morgan, Scioto, and Seneca counties.

== Government ==
The township is governed by a three-member board of trustees, who are elected in November of odd-numbered years to a four-year term beginning on the following January 1. Two are elected in the year after the presidential election and one is elected in the year before it. There is also an elected township fiscal officer, who serves a four-year term beginning on April 1 of the year after the election, which is held in November of the year before the presidential election. Vacancies in the fiscal officership or on the board of trustees are filled by the remaining trustees.

=== Township Officials ===
| Office | Name |
|---|---|
| Trustee | Michael Barnhisel |
| Trustee | Terry Hummel |
| Trustee | James Carter |
| Fiscal Officer | Robyn Mercer |
