= Dunbridge, Ohio =

- Unincorporated community
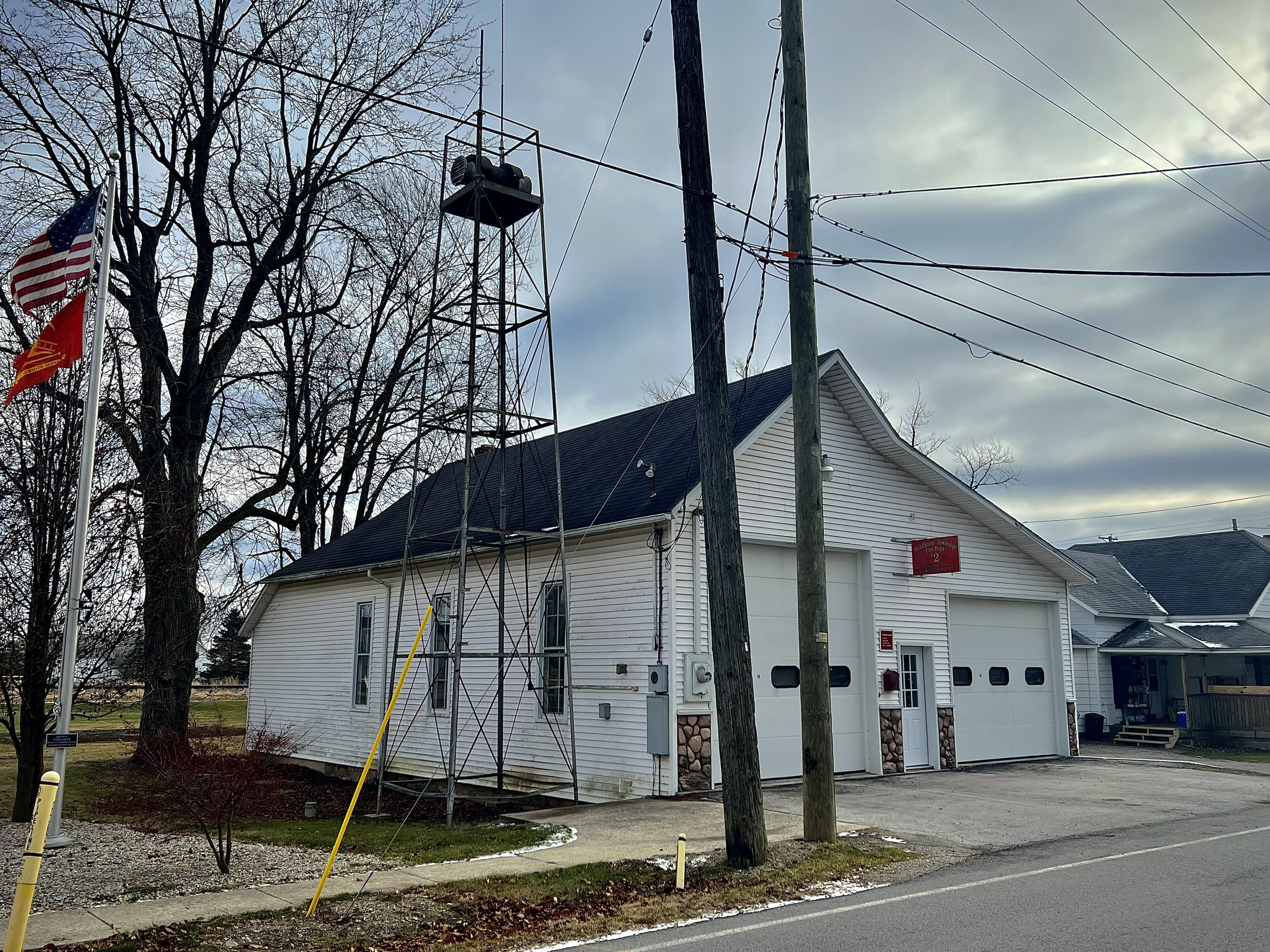
- Middleton Township Fire Dept. #2 in Dunbridge

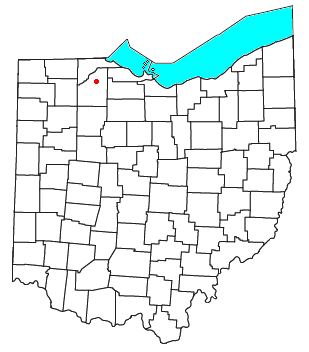
- Location of Dunbridge, Ohio
- Coordinates: 41°27′29″N 83°36′37″W
- Country: United States
- State: Ohio
- County: Wood
- Township: Middleton
- Elevation: 659 ft (201 m)
- Time zone: UTC-5 (Eastern (EST))
  - Summer (DST): UTC-4 (EDT)
- ZIP code: 43414
- Area code: 419
- GNIS feature ID: 1064563

Dunbridge is an unincorporated community in eastern Middleton Township, Wood County, Ohio, United States. It has a post office with the ZIP code 43414.

Dunbridge was laid out in 1882 by Robert Dunn, and named by combining the names of two early settlers: Dunn and Trowbridge.
