= Floral Hall (Bowling Green, Ohio) =

- U.S. National Register of Historic Places
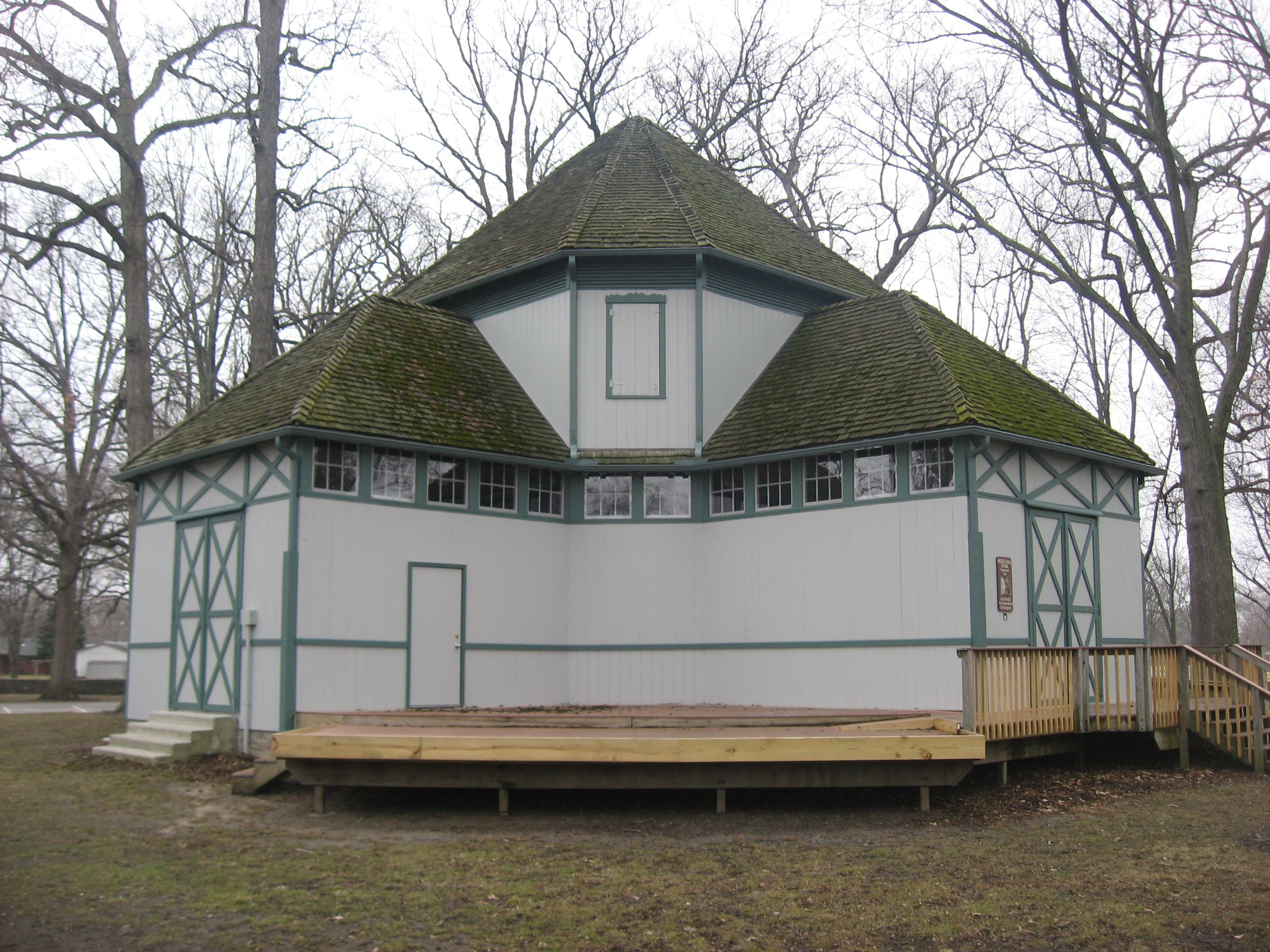
- Eastern front of the hall

- Location within Ohio Location within the United States
- Interactive map showing the location for Floral Hall
- Location: City Park on Conneaut Ave., Bowling Green, Ohio
- Coordinates: 41°22′48.5″N 83°39′32″W
- Area: Less than 1 acre (0.40 ha)
- Built: 1884
- NRHP reference No.: 82003666
- Added to NRHP: July 27, 1982

The Floral Hall is a historic community building in the city of Bowling Green, Ohio, United States. Constructed in the 1880s for one of two competing county fairs, it is typical of exhibition buildings from the period. Although no longer used for the county fair, it has been named a historic site.

== History ==
=== Background ===
The first Wood County fair was held in 1851 in Bowling Green, although the next five years saw it held also at Perrysburg and Portageville, due partially to dissension among the sponsoring Agricultural Society members and partially to the presence of diseases such as cholera and ague in the different grounds. The board purchased land at Tontogany for permanent fair grounds after the end of the Civil War, but Bowling Green still retained the memory of holding the county fair. This state of affairs ultimately induced the formation of a separate Wood County Fair Company in Bowling Green, which obtained land in Bowling Green and began holding fairs in 1881, becoming successful enough that the Agricultural Society began merger talks in 1885. From 1884 until 1894, their receipts grew from $3,889.30 to $7,945.99.

=== Usage ===
The Floral Hall was constructed in 1884 at the fairgrounds in Bowling Green; it originally held horticultural exhibits, although in the 20th century it was renamed "Needle Hall" after it began hosting needlework exhibitions. In later years, the fair moved to another location, the original grounds were converted into a city park, and all other buildings from the fairgrounds were eventually destroyed. However, the city retained the floral/needle hall, changing it into a picnic shelter and carefully attending to the building's upkeep.

== Architecture ==
Built of wood, the building sits on a brick foundation and is covered with a shingled roof. Stone elements are also present, and the water table is built of wood. One story tall, the hall is an octagonal structure, typical of Ohio floral halls from the period; its plan is essentially a modified Greek cross. The doors and other parts of the facade bear Stick-style detailing.

In 1982, the former floral/needle hall was listed on the National Register of Historic Places, qualifying both because of its architecture and because of its place in local history. It is one of five National Register-listed locations in Bowling Green, and one of thirty-one in Wood County. Another Register-listed octagonal floral hall is located on the Morrow County fairgrounds in Mount Gilead.
