= Risingsun, Ohio =

- Village
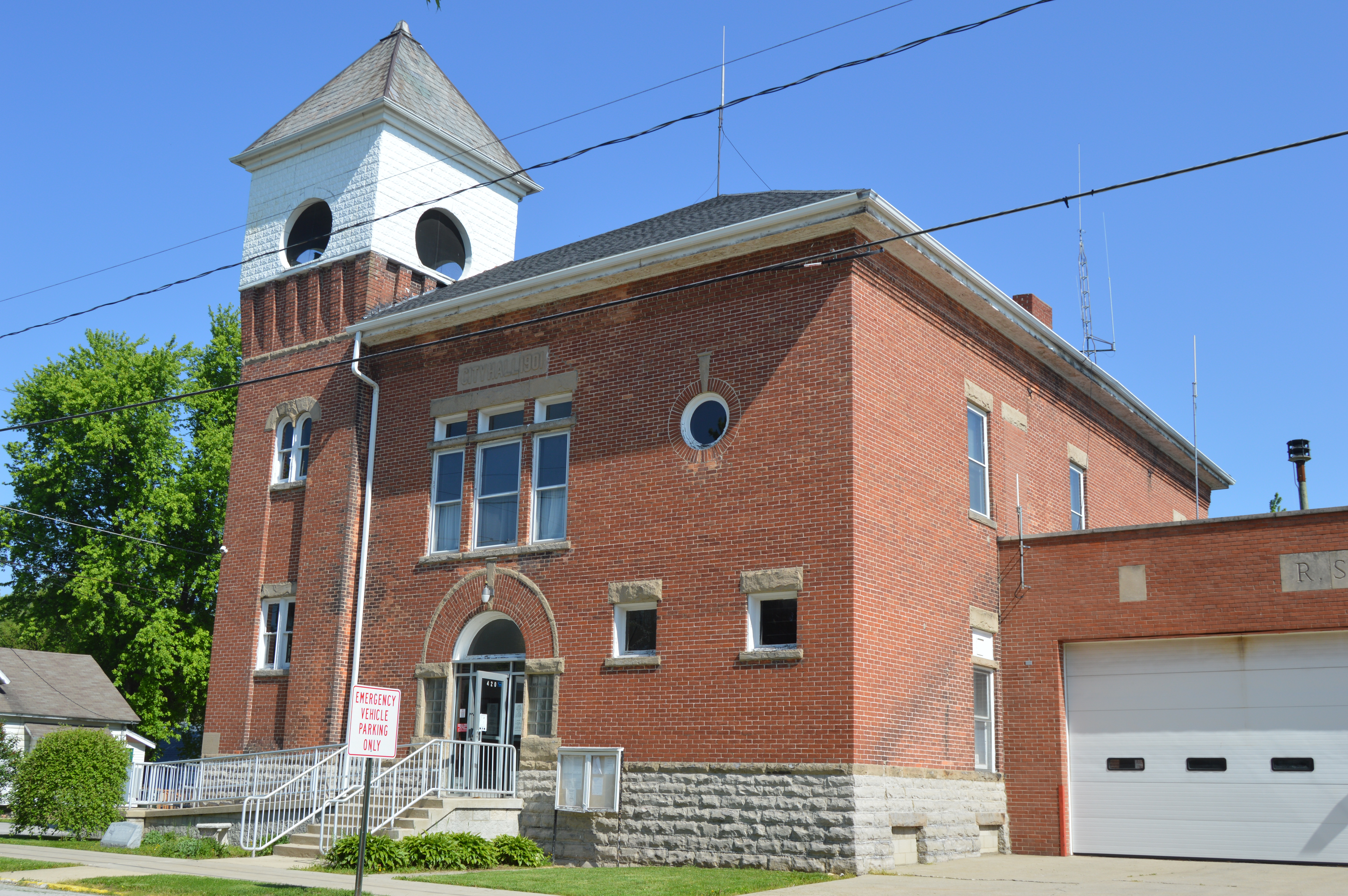
- Village Hall

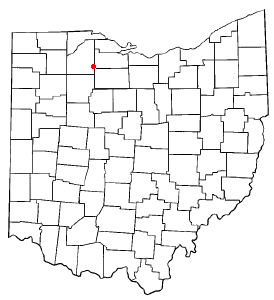
- Location of Risingsun, Ohio

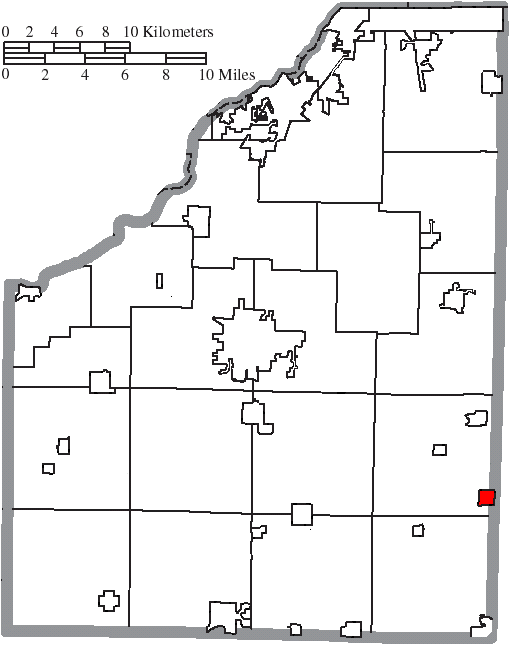
- Location of Risingsun in Wood County
- Coordinates: 41°16′01″N 83°25′37″W
- Country: United States
- State: Ohio
- County: Wood
- Township: Montgomery

Area
  - Total: 0.57 sq mi (1.48 km^{2})
  - Land: 0.57 sq mi (1.48 km^{2})
  - Water: 0 sq mi (0.00 km^{2})
- Elevation: 715 ft (218 m)

Population (2020)
  - Total: 541
  - Density: 949.8/sq mi (366.71/km^{2})
- Time zone: UTC-5 (Eastern (EST))
  - Summer (DST): UTC-4 (EDT)
- ZIP code: 43457
- Area code: 419
- FIPS code: 39-67314
- GNIS feature ID: 2399082
- Website: https://villageofrisingsun.org/

Risingsun is a village in Wood County, Ohio, United States. The population was 541 at the 2020 census.

== History ==
The first settlement at what is now Risingsun was made in the 1830s. Risingsun was platted in 1876. A post office called Rising Sun was established in 1873, and the spelling was changed to Risingsun in 1894. The village was incorporated in 1879.

== Geography ==
According to the United States Census Bureau, the village has a total area of 0.57 square miles (1.48 km^{2}), all land.

== Demographics ==
Historical population
Census	Pop.	Note	%±
1880	344		—
1890	485		41.0%
1900	600		23.7%
1910	599		−0.2%
1920	479		−20.0%
1930	628		31.1%
1940	645		2.7%
1950	744		15.3%
1960	815		9.5%
1970	730		−10.4%
1980	698		−4.4%
1990	659		−5.6%
2000	620		−5.9%
2010	606		−2.3%
2020	541		−10.7%
U.S. Decennial Census

=== 2010 census ===
As of the census of 2010, there were 606 people, 222 households, and 162 families living in the village. The population density was 1,063.2 inhabitants per square mile (410.5/km^{2}). There were 247 housing units at an average density of 433.3 per square mile (167.3/km^{2}). The racial makeup of the village was 96.0% White, 0.7% Native American, 0.2% Asian, 0.3% from other races, and 2.8% from two or more races. Hispanic or Latino of any race were 4.5% of the population.

There were 222 households, of which 35.6% had children under the age of 18 living with them, 49.1% were married couples living together, 13.5% had a female householder with no husband present, 10.4% had a male householder with no wife present, and 27.0% were non-families. 22.5% of all households were made up of individuals, and 12.2% had someone living alone who was 65 years of age or older. The average household size was 2.73 and the average family size was 3.09.

The median age in the village was 36 years. 27.9% of residents were under the age of 18; 10.2% were between the ages of 18 and 24; 25.8% were from 25 to 44; 23.8% were from 45 to 64; and 12.4% were 65 years of age or older. The gender makeup of the village was 52.8% male and 47.2% female.

=== 2000 census ===
As of the census of 2000, there were 620 people, 232 households, and 171 families living in the village. The population density was 1,073.8 inhabitants per square mile (414.6/km^{2}). There were 246 housing units at an average density of 426.1 per square mile (164.5/km^{2}). The racial makeup of the village was 97.42% White, 0.48% Native American, 0.16% Asian, 1.13% from other races, and 0.81% from two or more races. Hispanic or Latino of any race were 2.26% of the population.

There were 232 households, out of which 39.2% had children under the age of 18 living with them, 56.0% were married couples living together, 10.8% had a female householder with no husband present, and 25.9% were non-families. 24.1% of all households were made up of individuals, and 10.3% had someone living alone who was 65 years of age or older. The average household size was 2.67 and the average family size was 3.10.

In the village, the population was spread out, with 30.8% under the age of 18, 7.4% from 18 to 24, 32.3% from 25 to 44, 19.0% from 45 to 64, and 10.5% who were 65 years of age or older. The median age was 34 years. For every 100 females there were 85.1 males. For every 100 females age 18 and over, there were 95.9 males.

The median income for a household in the village was $37,656, and the median income for a family was $40,417. Males had a median income of $31,000 versus $24,821 for females. The per capita income for the village was $15,983. About 5.8% of families and 7.2% of the population were below the poverty line, including 5.8% of those under age 18 and none of those age 65 or over.

== Education ==
Almost all of its area is in the Lakota Local School District.
