= Cass Township, Hancock County, Ohio =

Township in Ohio, US

- Township
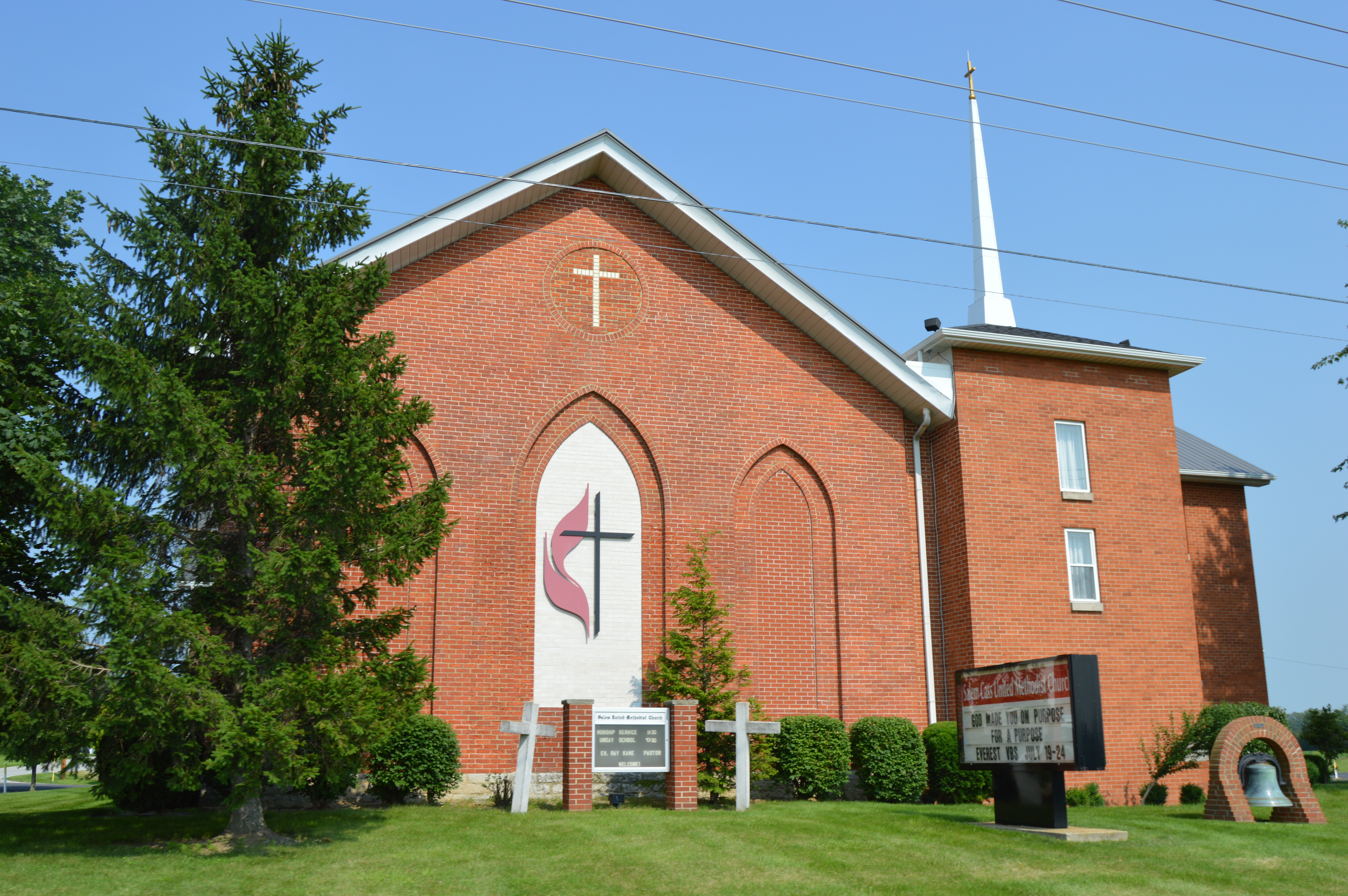
- Salem Cass United Methodist Church

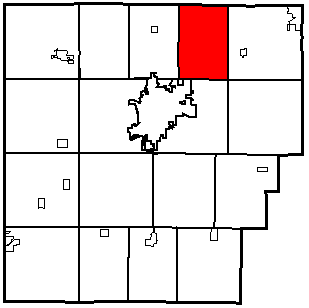
- Location of Cass Township in Hancock County
- Coordinates: 41°7′28″N 83°33′52″W
- Country: United States
- State: Ohio
- County: Hancock

Area
  - Total: 24.0 sq mi (62.2 km^{2})
  - Land: 24.0 sq mi (62.2 km^{2})
  - Water: 0 sq mi (0.0 km^{2})
- Elevation: 794 ft (242 m)

Population (2020)
  - Total: 1,008
  - Density: 42.0/sq mi (16.2/km^{2})
- Time zone: UTC-5 (Eastern (EST))
  - Summer (DST): UTC-4 (EDT)
- FIPS code: 39-12392
- GNIS feature ID: 1086242

Cass Township is one of the seventeen townships of Hancock County, Ohio, United States. As of the 2020 census the population was 1,008.

== Geography ==
Located in the northern part of the county, it borders the following townships:

- Bloom Township, Wood County - north
- Perry Township, Wood County - northeast corner
- Washington Township - east
- Biglick Township - southeast corner
- Marion Township - south
- Allen Township - west

No municipalities are located in Cass Township.

== Name and history ==
Statewide, other Cass Townships are located in Muskingum and Richland counties.

Cass Township was organized in 1833. It was named for Lewis Cass, who had then recently served as Territorial Governor of Michigan.

== Government ==
The township is governed by a three-member board of trustees, who are elected in November of odd-numbered years to a four-year term beginning on the following January 1. Two are elected in the year after the presidential election and one is elected in the year before it. There is also an elected township fiscal officer, who serves a four-year term beginning on April 1 of the year after the election, which is held in November of the year before the presidential election. Vacancies in the fiscal officership or on the board of trustees are filled by the remaining trustees.
