= Middleton Township, Wood County, Ohio =

Township in Ohio, US

- Township
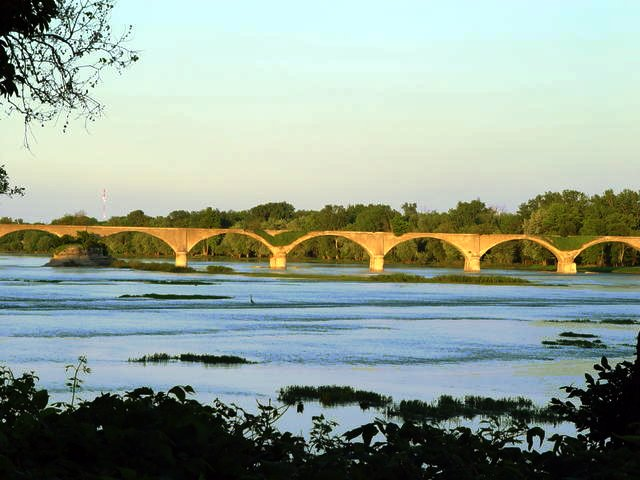
- Interurban Bridge

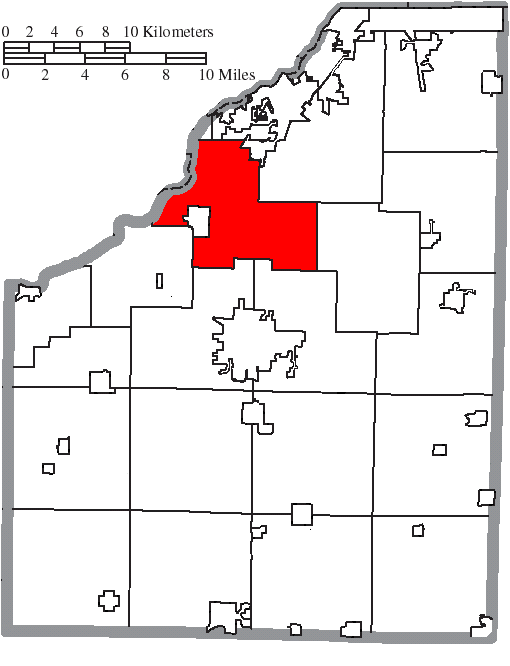
- Location of Middleton Township in Wood County
- Coordinates: 41°27′59″N 83°40′4″W
- Country: United States
- State: Ohio
- County: Wood

Area
  - Total: 32.5 sq mi (84.1 km^{2})
  - Land: 32.2 sq mi (83.3 km^{2})
  - Water: 0.31 sq mi (0.8 km^{2})
- Elevation: 663 ft (202 m)

Population (2020)
  - Total: 5,611
  - Density: 175/sq mi (67.4/km^{2})
- Time zone: UTC-5 (Eastern (EST))
  - Summer (DST): UTC-4 (EDT)
- FIPS code: 39-49812
- GNIS feature ID: 1087188
- Website: https://www.middletontownship.com/

Middleton Township is one of the nineteen townships of Wood County, Ohio, United States. The 2020 census found 5,611 people in the township.

== Geography ==
Located in the northern part of the county, it borders the following townships and city:

- Perrysburg - north
- Perrysburg Township - northeast
- Webster Township - east
- Center Township - southeast
- Plain Township - south
- Washington Township - southwest
- Waterville Township, Lucas County - northwest

The village of Haskins is located in western Middleton Township, and the unincorporated community of Dunbridge lies in the township's east.

== Name and history ==
Middleton Township was established in 1832. Statewide, the only other Middleton Township is located in Columbiana County.

== Government ==
The township is governed by a three-member board of trustees, who are elected in November of odd-numbered years to a four-year term beginning on the following January 1. Two are elected in the year after the presidential election and one is elected in the year before it. There is also an elected township fiscal officer, who serves a four-year term beginning on April 1 of the year after the election, which is held in November of the year before the presidential election. Vacancies in the fiscal officership or on the board of trustees are filled by the remaining trustees.

The Middleton Township Building is located on Ohio State Route 25 (Dixie Highway), north of State Route 582.
