= Portage Township, Wood County, Ohio =

Township in Ohio, US

- Township
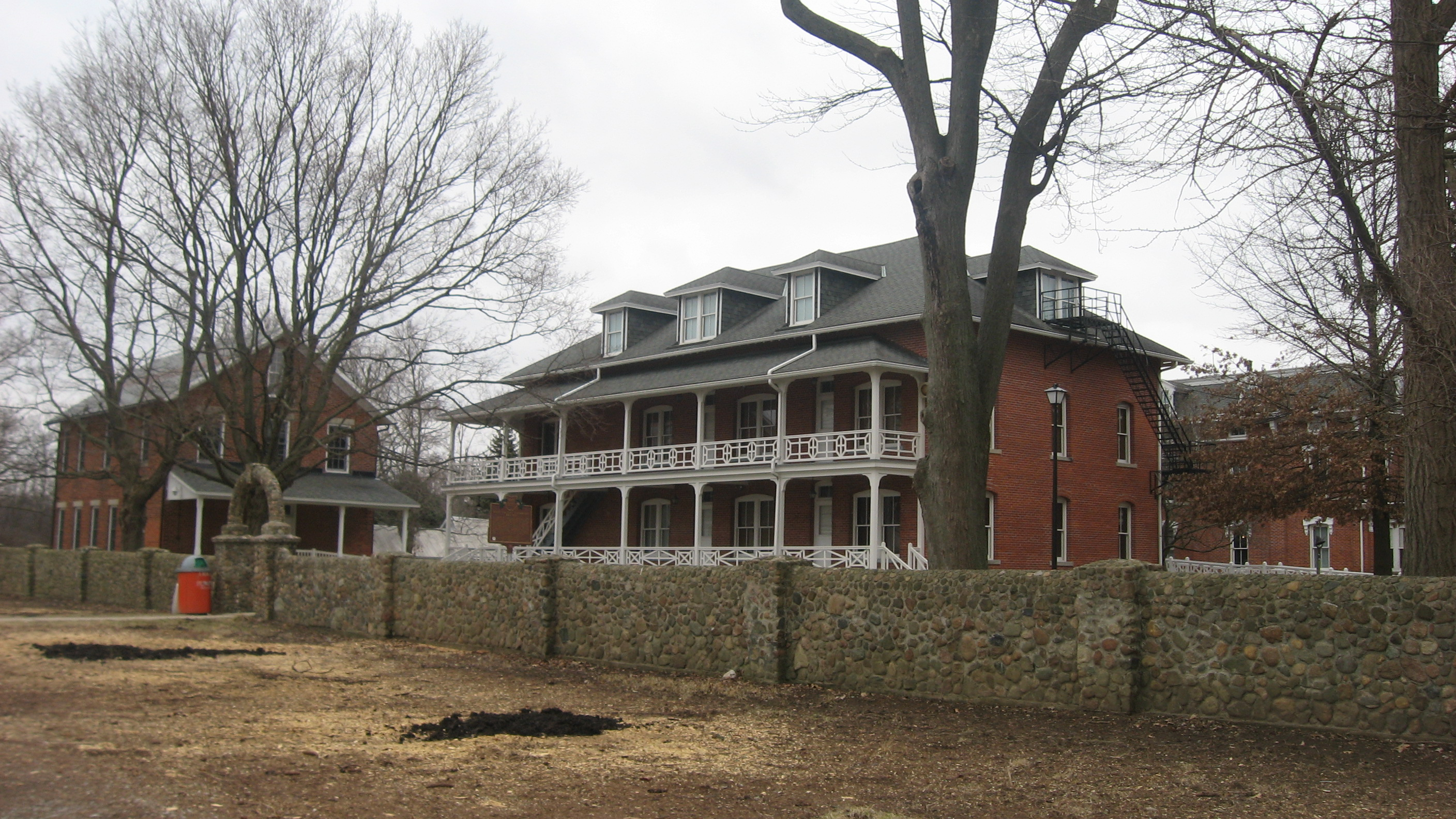
- The Wood County Home and Infirmary, southeast of Bowling Green

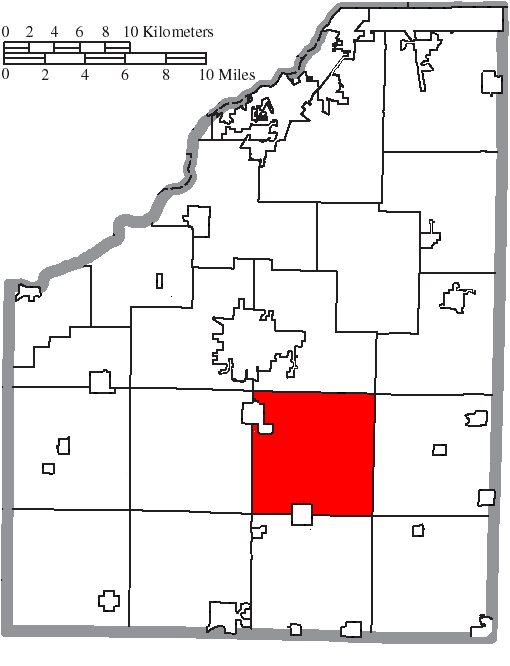
- Location of Portage Township in Wood County
- Coordinates: 41°17′56″N 83°36′23″W
- Country: United States
- State: Ohio
- County: Wood

Area
  - Total: 36.6 sq mi (94.7 km^{2})
  - Land: 36.5 sq mi (94.5 km^{2})
  - Water: 0.077 sq mi (0.2 km^{2})
- Elevation: 676 ft (206 m)

Population (2020)
  - Total: 1,558
  - Density: 43/sq mi (16.5/km^{2})
- Time zone: UTC-5 (Eastern (EST))
  - Summer (DST): UTC-4 (EDT)
- ZIP code: 43451
- Area code: 419
- FIPS code: 39-64122
- GNIS feature ID: 1087196

Portage Township is one of the nineteen townships of Wood County, Ohio, United States. The 2020 census found 1,558 people in the township.

== Geography ==
Located in the center of the county, it borders the following townships:

- Center Township - north
- Freedom Township - northeast corner
- Montgomery Township - east
- Perry Township - southeast corner
- Bloom Township - south
- Henry Township - southwest corner
- Liberty Township - west
- Plain Township - northwest corner

Two villages are located in Portage Township: part of Jerry City in the south, and part of Portage in the northwest.

== Name and history ==
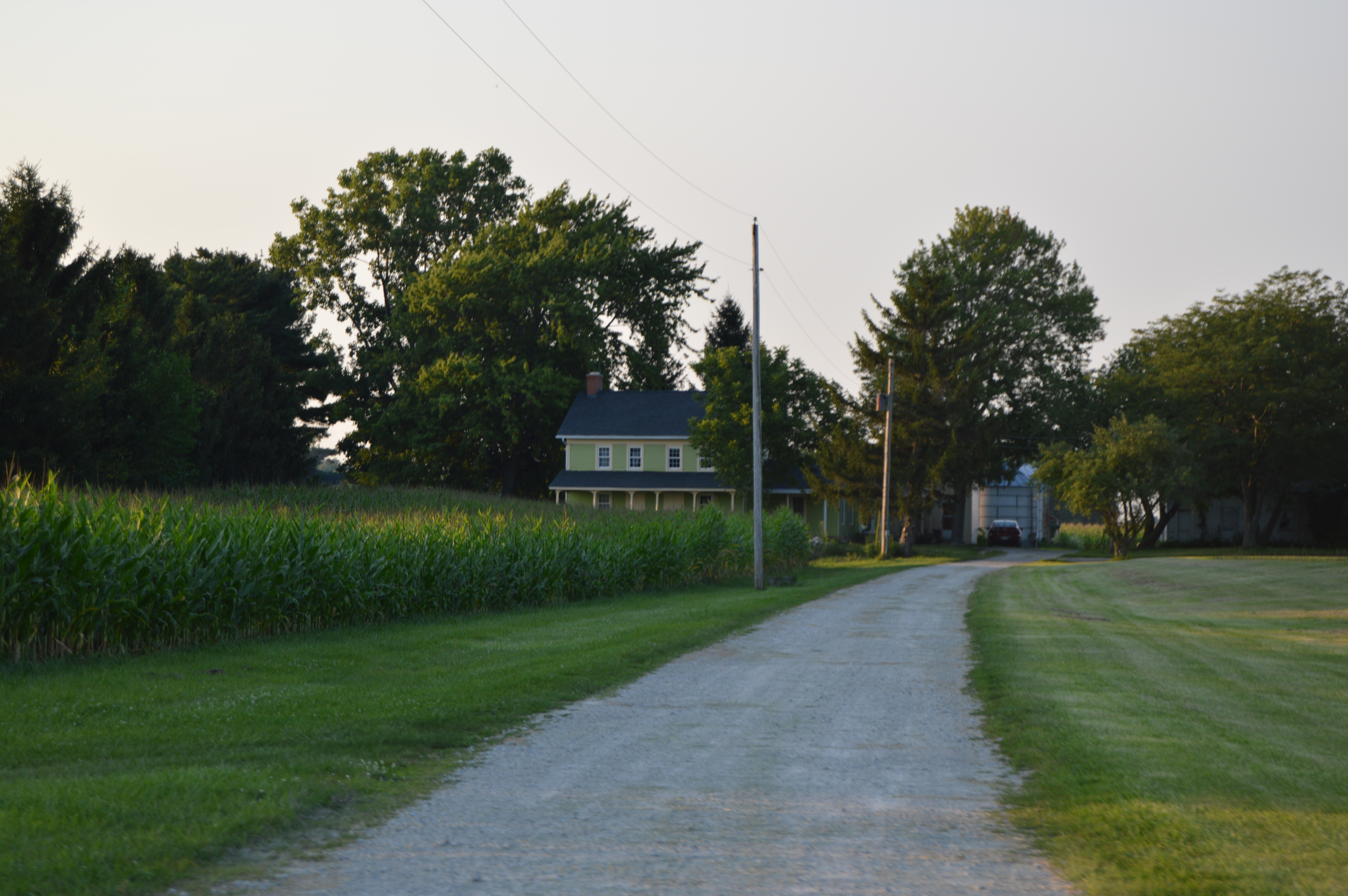
The historic William Graham Farmhouse in Portage Township

Portage Township was established in 1832. Statewide, other Portage Townships are located in Hancock and Ottawa counties.

== Government ==
The township is governed by a three-member board of trustees, who are elected in November of odd-numbered years to a four-year term beginning on the following January 1. Two are elected in the year after the presidential election and one is elected in the year before it. There is also an elected township fiscal officer, who serves a four-year term beginning on April 1 of the year after the election, which is held in November of the year before the presidential election. Vacancies in the fiscal officership or on the board of trustees are filled by the remaining trustees.

The Portage Township House is located at the intersection of Huffman and Mermill roads.
