= Suburban Lakes League =

Defunct athletic league in Ohio, United States

The Suburban Lakes League (SLL) was an OHSAA athletic league with 7 member schools located in northwest Ohio. The league was formed in 1972 by former members of the Northern Lakes League, Sandusky Bay Conference, and the Lakeshore Conference.

== Members at the time of dissolution ==
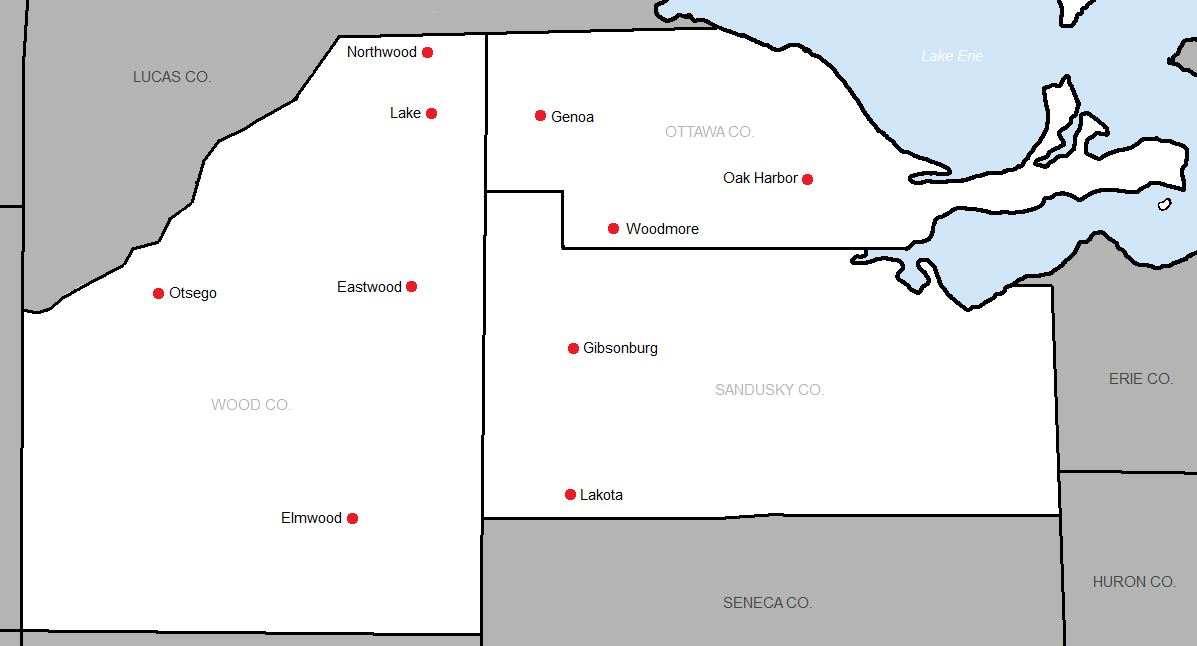
The all-time members of the SLL over 1972-2011.

School	Nickname	Location	Colors	Tenure
Eastwood	Eagles	Pemberville	Red, White, Columbia	1972-2011
Elmwood	Royals	Bloomdale	Royal Blue, White	1972-2011
Genoa	Comets	Genoa	Maroon, Gray	1972-2011
Gibsonburg	Golden Bears	Gibsonburg	Orange, Black	1972-2011
Lake	Flyers	Millbury	Navy, White, Columbia	1996-2011
Otsego	Knights	Tontogany	Black, Orange, White	1972-2011
Woodmore	Wildcats	Elmore	Navy, Gold	1972-2011

== Former members ==
School	Nickname	Location	Colors	Tenure
Lakota	Raiders	Kansas	Navy, White	1972–2009
Northwood	Rangers	Northwood	Blue, Yellow	1986–2000
Oak Harbor	Rockets	Oak Harbor	Red, Green, White	1972–1986

== League history ==
=== 1970s ===
- For the 1972-73 school year, Eastwood, Elmwood, and Genoa leave the Northern Lakes League to form the SLL with Gibsonburg, Lakota, and Oak Harbor from the Sandusky Bay Conference, and Otsego and Woodmore from the Lakeshore Conference. Geographic location and comparable athletic competition were acknowledged as sound reasons for establishing the league.

=== 1980s ===
- At the end of the 1985-86 school year, Oak Harbor leaves to rejoin the Sandusky Bay Conference, leaving the SLL with seven members.
- Northwood joined the league as the eighth member for the 1986-87 school year after the Lakeshore Conference had folded in the winter of 1985.

=== 1990s ===
- Lake becomes the ninth league member in 1996, leaving the NLL in similar fashion to its SLL predecessors.
- In 1999, the SLL extended an invitation to Rossford to be its tenth member. Rossford declined, which caused the SLL and TAAC to consider realigning their members with other area schools based on enrollment.

=== 2000s ===
- In 2000, Northwood leaves the league for the TAAC after Rossford declines to join the SLL as its tenth member.
- In 2008, realignment issues are stirred up again when Lakota decides to leave for the Midland Athletic League in 2009, opening the door for another potential member. Rossford was considered as the prime choice for replacement, but a 4-3 vote amongst member schools (4 in favor, 3 against) turned them down. 6 schools would have had to approve Rossford's admission due to the 75% vote clause.
- In 2009, both Rossford and Fostoria High Schools were turned down as potential members with the current members not gathering the necessary 6-1 vote. However, the 7 SLL school principals later considered expanding the league to 12 members by the 2011-12 school year, with 2 divisions (Big Schools and Small Schools). The 5 other schools were not specifically named, but it was noted that both Rossford and Fostoria fit the profile of the larger school division, which would have included Eastwood, Genoa, Lake, and Otsego. The smaller division would have consisted of Elmwood, Gibsonburg, Woodmore, and 3 other area schools close to their enrollment sizes. Geography and size pointed at Northwood, Ottawa Hills, Cardinal Stritch, and Toledo Christian. Eastwood and Genoa's superintendents decided that the 12 team league would not work because they did not want Fostoria in their league.
- In May 2009, Eastwood, Genoa, Lake, Otsego, and Woodmore agreed to withdraw from the Suburban Lakes League and form a new league with Rossford. This was an attempt to circumvent the bylaws of the league after Rossford was voted down by a 5-2 vote (Rossford needed 75% (6 out of 7) of the vote to be added into the SLL). It was decided that league play for the new Northern Buckeye Conference would begin in the fall of 2011. This move left Elmwood and Gibsonburg as the lone members of the SLL for that time.
- Elmwood was invited to join the Northern Buckeye Conference on August 12 along with Fostoria.
- On September 9, 2009, Elmwood officially joined the NBC after being turned away from the MAL the day before. Gibsonburg was also denied MAL membership, but they applied to join the Toledo Area Athletic Conference on September 16.
- Gibsonburg was invited to join the TAAC on October 7, 2009. They became a voting member of the league on January 1, 2010 and joined the TAAC when the Suburban Lakes League dissolved in 2011.

=== 2010s ===
- Athletic competition for the league ended with the conclusion of the spring sports seasons in 2011.

=== State Champions ===
BOYS

- Woodmore- Golf (Class A) - 1979, 1981
- Gibsonburg - Baseball (Div. IV) - 2005
- Eastwood- Track & Field (Div. II) - 2009, 2010

GIRLS

- Lakota - Track & Field (Class AA) - 1987
- Otsego - Volleyball (Div. III) - 1992
- Eastwood - Volleyball (Div. II) - 1993
- Woodmore - Cross Country (Div. II) - 1992, 1993
- Woodmore - Cross Country (Div. III) - 1994
- Woodmore - Track & Field (Div. III) - 1993
- Gibsonburg - Softball (Div. IV) - 2001, 2002, 2003

=== Football champions ===
Year	Champions
1972	Genoa
1973	Gibsonburg
1974	Eastwood, Oak Harbor
1975	Genoa
1976	Genoa, Gibsonburg
1977	Eastwood
1978	Genoa
1979	Gibsonburg, Lakota
1980	Gibsonburg
1981	Oak Harbor, Otsego
1982	Oak Harbor
1983	Woodmore
1984	Oak Harbor
1985	Otsego
1986	Eastwood, Woodmore
1987	Otsego
1988	Eastwood
1989	Genoa
1990	Genoa, Otsego
1991	Elmwood, Northwood
1992	Genoa, Otsego
1993	Otsego
1994	Genoa
1995	Woodmore
1996	Woodmore
1997	Elmwood, Woodmore
1998	Elmwood, Gibsonburg
1999	Gibsonburg
2000	Gibsonburg, Otsego
2001	Lake
2002	Eastwood
2003	Eastwood, Elmwood
2004	Eastwood
2005	Eastwood, Elmwood, Otsego
2006	Eastwood, Elmwood
2007	Genoa
2008	Genoa
2009	Genoa
2010	Genoa

== See also ==
- Ohio High School Athletic Conferences
