= Northern Buckeye Conference =

Coordinates: 41°20′N 83°25′W

- Association: Ohio High School Athletic Association
- Founded: 2011
- First season: Fall 2011
- Sports fielded: Baseball • Basketball • Bowling • Cross-country • Football • Golf • Soccer • Softball • Tennis • Track and field • Volleyball • Wrestling
- No. of teams: 8
- Region: Lucas, Ottawa and Wood County, Ohio
- Website: nbc-ohio.org

Locations
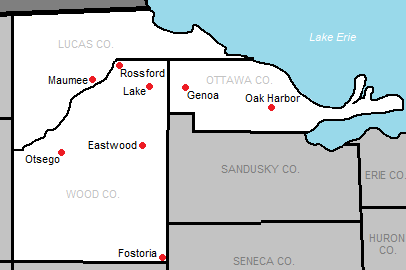
- The member schools of the Northern Buckeye Conference.

The Northern Buckeye Conference (NBC) is an OHSAA high school athletic conference that began athletic competition in 2011 with 8 high schools from Northwest Ohio's Ottawa and Wood counties as members.

== Members ==
School	Nickname	Location	Enrollment (CB/FB 2024)	State FB Region (2024)	Colors	Type	Middle school(s)	Joined League
Eastwood	Eagles	Pemberville	187	5:18	Red, White, Columbia Blue	Public	Eastwood MS	2011
Fostoria	Redmen	Fostoria	197	5:18	Red, Black	Public	Fostoria JHS	2011
Genoa	Comets	Genoa	177	5:18	Maroon, Gray	Public	John C. Roberts MS	2011
Lake	Flyers	Millbury	198	5:18	Navy Blue, White, Columbia Blue	Public	Lake MS	2011
Maumee	Panthers	Maumee	282	3:10	Purple, Gold	Public	Gateway MS	2023
Oak Harbor	Rockets	Oak Harbor	195	5:18	Red, Green, White	Public	Oak Harbor Intermediate	2023
Otsego	Knights	Tontogany	205	4:14	Black, Orange, White	Public	Otsego JHS	2011
Rossford	Bulldogs	Rossford	231	4:14	Maroon, Gray	Public	Rossford JHS	2011

=== Former members ===
School	Nickname	Location	Colors	Tenure	Current Conference
Elmwood	Royals	Bloomdale	Royal Blue, White	2011-2023	Blanchard Valley Conference
Woodmore	Wildcats	Elmore	Navy, Gold	2011-2023	Sandusky Bay Conference

== History ==
=== 2010s ===
The NBC officially formed on July 1, 2011, and began its inaugural season in fall 2011. The idea for the league was born in spring 2009 when the Suburban Lakes League was unable to gather enough votes among member schools to make former Northern Lakes League member Rossford its eighth member as a replacement for Lakota. The SLL principals created a plan for a 12-team, two-division league upon the request of Eastwood's superintendent, and voted 6–0–1 to begin contacting schools to invite them into this league. Shortly after, the idea for expansion was dropped when the seven members could not agree on which schools to approve extending membership to. Speculation on proposed members was pointed at Rossford, Fostoria, Maumee, Northwood, Ottawa Hills, Cardinal Stritch, and Danbury.

Ultimately, the five SLL schools that "voted" for Rossford's inclusion held a superintendent's meeting without Gibsonburg and Elmwood to discuss creating a new league. In this meeting, Eastwood, Genoa, Lake, Otsego and Woodmore decide to withdraw from the Suburban Lakes League in order to create a new league with Rossford called the Northern Buckeye Conference. Former NLL commissioner and Northview High School athletic director Larry Jones was named league commissioner, which became effective on August 1, 2009. Plans to add two more schools to the league became a priority shortly after. Elmwood, Fostoria, and Maumee confirmed receiving verbal invitations to apply for NBC membership, and on August 5, 2009, Commissioner Jones announced that only Elmwood and Fostoria had formally applied prior to the July 31 deadline. Maumee's school board voted on August 3, 2009, to remain in the NLL. The NBC voted to invite both Elmwood and Fostoria on August 12, to which Fostoria quickly accepted on August 17 and Elmwood on September 9, after they were denied admission into the Midland Athletic League.

Since the league has Northern Lakes League commissioner Larry Morrison as a consultant, and five of the schools had prior membership with the NLL, the NBC set up their league bylaws and constitution similar to the NLL's. This also includes a "majority rules" clause for votes, which is different from the SLL's that called for a 75% vote.

Commissioner Jones stepped down at the end of May 2013 and handed the reins over to Dave Bringman.

=== 2020s ===
In August 2020, Elmwood announced they had received a formal invitation from the Blanchard Valley Conference and were seriously looking at the opportunity. However, no immediate plans were announced to leave the Northern Buckeye Conference. Ultimately, on February 8, 2021, the Elmwood Local Schools board unanimously approved that the Elmwood Royals would leave the NBC and join the Blanchard Valley Conference in the 2023-2024 school year.

On March 22, 2021, the school board at Maumee voted unanimously to leave the NLL and join the Northern Buckeye Conference no later than the 2023-24 school year as a replacement for Elmwood, following their departure to Blanchard Valley Conference.

On May 20, 2021, Woodmore's school board announced they were going to accept the Sandusky Bay Conference's invitation to join their league for the 2023-24 school year. Woodmore joined the SBC's River Division with schools of similar enrollment size.

On May 26, 2021, the school board at Oak Harbor announced they would be leaving the SBC and accepting the NBC's invitation to replace Woodmore.

== League championships ==
=== Boys championships ===
School Year	Football	Soccer	Cross Country	Golf	Basketball	Wrestling	Baseball	Track & Field
2011-12	Eastwood	Woodmore	Elmwood	Woodmore	Eastwood, Lake	Elmwood	Lake	Eastwood
2012-13	Genoa	Woodmore	Otsego	Woodmore	Otsego	Genoa	Otsego	Eastwood
2013-14	Genoa	Rossford	Otsego	Lake	Lake	Genoa	Lake	Eastwood
2014-15	Eastwood	Rossford	Otsego	Rossford	Lake, Rossford	Genoa	Genoa	Eastwood
2015-16	Lake	Eastwood	Otsego	Rossford	Elmwood, Rossford	Genoa	Eastwood, Elmwood, Lake	Eastwood
2016-17	Eastwood	Lake	Otsego	Rossford	Eastwood, Genoa	Genoa	Rossford	Eastwood
2017-18	Eastwood	Lake, Woodmore	Eastwood	Genoa	Genoa	Genoa	Eastwood	Eastwood
2018-19	Genoa	Woodmore	Genoa	Genoa	Genoa	Genoa	Lake	Eastwood
2019-20	Eastwood	Rossford	Otsego	Genoa	Rossford	Eastwood	Season Canceled	Season Canceled
2020-21	Otsego	Genoa	Genoa	Genoa, Woodmore	Rossford	Elmwood	Lake	Genoa
2021-22	Otsego	Genoa	Otsego	Lake	Eastwood	Lake	Eastwood	Eastwood
2022-23	Eastwood	Genoa, Lake	Otsego	Genoa	Rossford	Genoa	Eastwood	Eastwood
2023-24	Oak Harbor	Maumee	Otsego	Genoa	Fostoria, Genoa	Genoa	Lake	Oak Harbor
2024-25	Oak Harbor	Maumee	Otsego	Genoa	Otsego	Genoa	Lake	Oak Harbor

=== Girls championships ===
School Year	Volleyball	Soccer	Cross Country	Golf	Basketball	Softball	Track & Field
2011-12	Eastwood	Lake	Eastwood	Elmwood	Lake	Eastwood	Eastwood
2012-13	Eastwood	Lake	Eastwood	Otsego	Elmwood	Elmwood	Eastwood
2013-14	Otsego	Woodmore	Eastwood	Elmwood	Elmwood	Eastwood	Eastwood
2014-15	Otsego	Lake	Eastwood	Otsego	Otsego	Elmwood	Eastwood
2015-16	Eastwood, Otsego	Woodmore	Woodmore	Elmwood	Genoa	Eastwood	Eastwood
2016-17	Eastwood	Woodmore	Otsego	Rossford	Otsego	Eastwood	Eastwood
2017-18	Eastwood	Lake	Eastwood	Otsego	Eastwood, Elmwood	Eastwood	Eastwood
2018-19	Fostoria	Lake	Woodmore	Otsego	Eastwood, Elmwood, Lake	Eastwood	Eastwood
2019-20	Otsego	Eastwood	Genoa	Otsego	Otsego	Season Canceled	Season Canceled
2020-21	Eastwood, Lake	Eastwood	Woodmore	Rossford	Elmwood, Woodmore	Otsego	Eastwood
2021-22	Lake	Eastwood	Eastwood	Otsego	Elmwood, Lake	Otsego	Eastwood
2022-23	Lake	Eastwood	Eastwood	Otsego	Fostoria, Woodmore	Eastwood	Woodmore

== Individual State Champions ==
- Erik Fertig, Eastwood, Discus, 2019
- Katelyn Meyer, Eastwood, High Jump, 2018
- Erik Fertig, Eastwood, Discus, 2018
- Regan Clay, Rossford, 400m, 2016
- Regan Clay, Rossford, 400m, 2015
- Cole Gorski, Otsego, Pole Vault, 2014
- Jay Nino, Genoa, Wrestling (220 lb.), 2014

=== See also ===
Ohio High School Athletic Conferences
