= Penta Career Center =

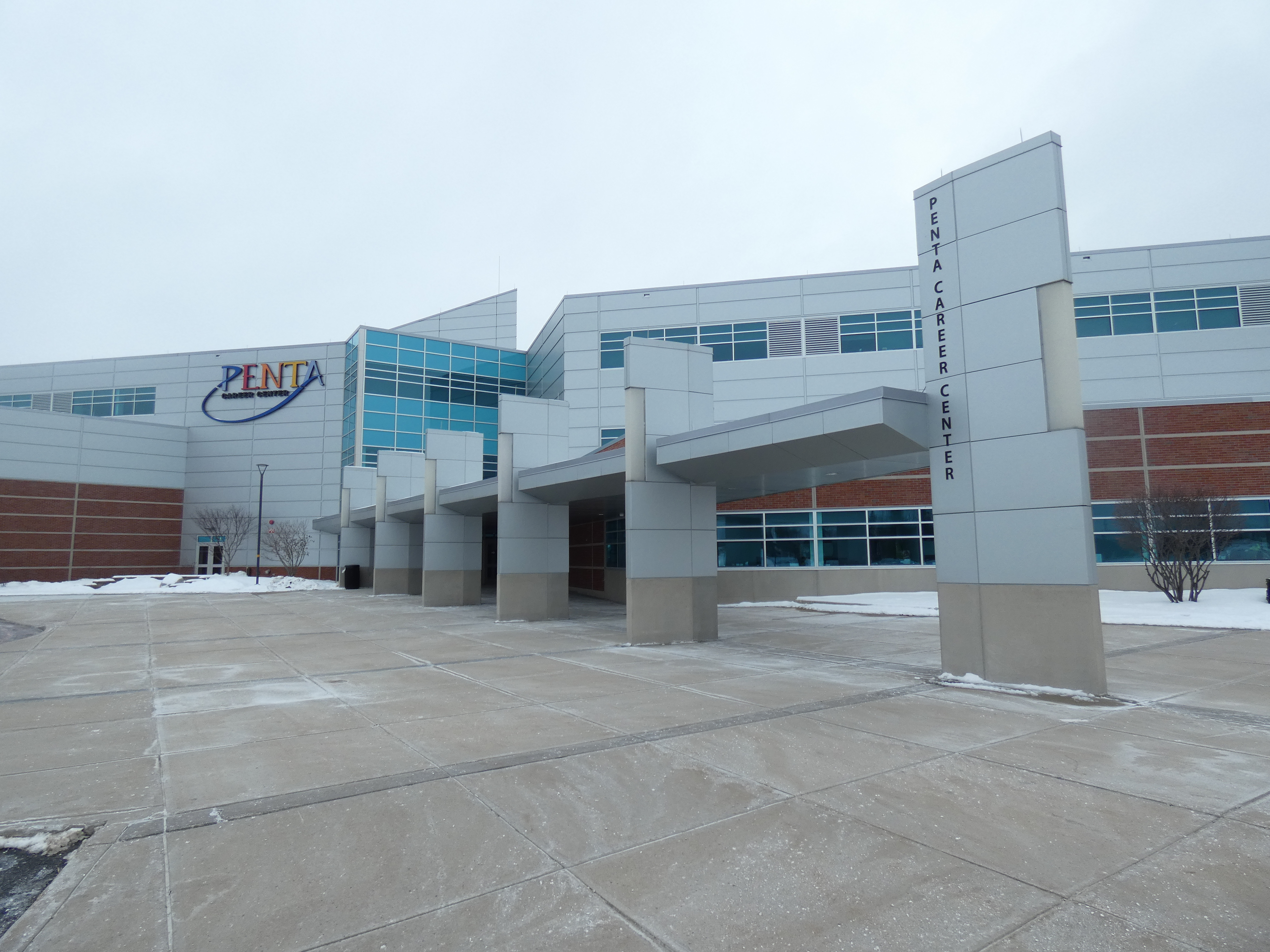
- School's main entrance

Location
- 9301 Buck Road; Perrysburg, Ohio, 43551; Wood County; United States
- Coordinates: 41°35′2.14″N 83°34′17.04″W

Information
- Type: Public Vocational HS
- Grades: 10-12
- Website: Penta Career Center

Penta Career Center is a public vocational high school (grades 10-12) and adult education center in Perrysburg Township, Wood County, Ohio. It opened in 1965. It serves 16 school districts from the five counties of Fulton, Lucas, Ottawa, Sandusky, and Wood, hence the name "Penta".

== School districts served ==
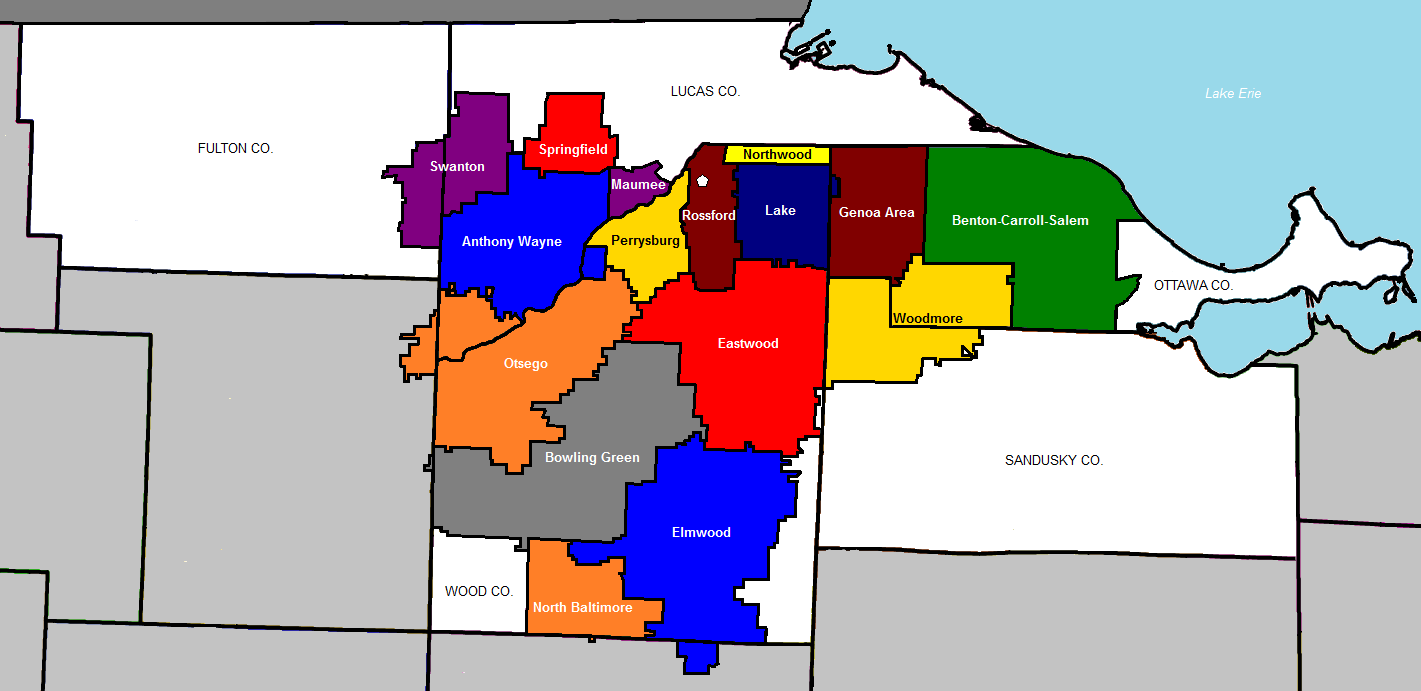
School districts served by Penta. Penta's location is marked with a white pentagon in Rossford's school district.

- Anthony Wayne Local School District
- Benton-Carroll-Salem Local School District
- Bowling Green City School District
- Eastwood Local School District
- Elmwood Local School District
- Genoa Area Local School District
- Lake Local School District
- Maumee City School District
- North Baltimore Local School District
- Northwood Local School District
- Otsego Local School District
- Perrysburg Exempted Village School District
- Rossford Exempted Village School District
- Springfield Local School District
- Swanton Local School District
- Woodmore Local School District

== Programs offered ==
=== High school ===
Agricultural & Environmental Systems

- Floral Design/Greenhouse Production
- Gas & Diesel Engine Systems
- Horticulture - Floral & Greenhouse Services
- Horticulture - Landscaping & Outdoor Services
- Small Animal Care

Arts & Communication

- Digital Video Production
- Digital Arts and Design

Business & Administrative Services

- Inventory & Warehouse Operations
- Medical & Legal Office Management

Construction Technologies

- Construction & Building Maintenance
- Construction Carpentry
- Construction Concepts
- Construction Electricity
- Construction Masonry
- Construction Remodeling
- Heating & Air Conditioning Technology
- Plumbing/HVAC

Education & Training

- Early Childhood Education
- Teaching Professions

Engineering & Science Technologies

- Engineering Technlogies
- Industrial Maintenance
- Modern Power Technology

Health Science

- Dental Assistant
- Exercise Science & Sports Medicine
- Medical Technology Academy
- Medical Technologies
- Phlebotomy

Hospitality & Tourism

- Culinary Arts
- Culinary & Hospitality Services

Human Services

- Cosmetology

Information Technology

- Information Technologies Academy

Law & Public Safety

- Criminal Justice
- Firefighter

Manufacturing Technologies

- Robotics & Automated Systems
- Welding

Marketing

- Marketing Education

Transportation Systems

- Automotive Collision Repair
- Automotive Technology
- Powersports & Engine Systems

Special Education

- Job Training
- TIES. Program

Sophomore Exploratory Program

- Business & Information Technology
- Construction
- Engineering & Manufacturing
- Health Services
- Human Services
- Transportation

=== Adult education ===
Full Time

- Auto Body Collision
- Automotive Technologies
- Builder, Contractor, & Remodeler
- General Office & Clerical Services
- Heating, Ventilation, Air Conditioning/Refrigeration
- Machine Trades
- Welding & Fabrication

Part Time

- Building & Maintenance
- CNC Programmer Training
- Computer Technology
- Customized/Industry Training
- Forklift Training
- HVAC EPA Test
- Lathe & Vertical Mill Operation
- Low Pressure Boiler Systems
- Marine Skills Mechanic
- OHSA 10-hour
- Plumbing Licensure
- Welding
- Transportation

Medical

- CPR
- Dietary Management Training (DMT)
- Pharmacy Technician
- Servsafe Certification
- State Certified Nurse's Aide (STNA)
- EKG Technician
- Phlebotomy Technician (partnered with Herzig University)

Online

- ed2go
- Electronic Health Records Specialist (partnered with Boston Reed)
- Medical Billing & Coding Specialist (partnered with Boston Reed)
