= Moline, Ohio =

Unincorporated community in Ohio, U.S.

Coordinates: 41°33′31″N 83°30′41″W

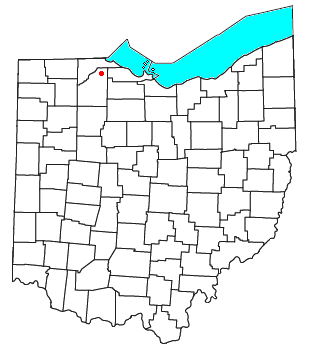
Location of Moline, Ohio

Moline is an unincorporated community in western Lake Township, Wood County, Ohio, United States.

Moline does not have a post office. It shares its ZIP code with neighboring Walbridge (43465).

== Geography ==
Moline is located at the intersection of Moline-Martin Road and East Broadway, approximately six miles south of Toledo. Moline is situated just south of State Route 795, which is the primary east-west artery of Lake Township, connecting Interstate 280 to Interstate 75 and the Ohio Turnpike. Its altitude is 623 feet (190 m).

== In pop culture ==
On the television medical drama show Grey's Anatomy, surgeon April Kepner is from Moline, Ohio, and her family owns a farm there. this was referenced in two episodes. Season 9, Episode 3 “Remember the Time” and in Season 6, Episode 24 "Death and All His Friends".

== 2010 Tornado ==
On the night of June 5th, 2010, a tornado touched down west of Moline near the intersection of Oregon Road and the Ohio Turnpike. The tornado traveled north east towards Moline and entered town near Arapaho Drive with a strength of EF1. The tornado strengthened to EF2 as it damaged homes on Cherokee, Shawnee, and Neill avenues and destroyed a section of Mainstreet Church.

The tornado went on to take seven lives, destroy the Lake Township Administration Building and Lake High School. It strengthened to EF4 strength as it destroyed many homes on Main Street in the town of Millbury.
