= Ohio State Route 795 =

State highway in southwestern Ohio, US

State Route 795

Route information
- Maintained by ODOT
- Length: 12.20 mi (19.63 km)
- Existed: 1937–present

Major junctions
- West end: US 20 / SR 199 in Perrysburg
- I-75 near Perrysburg; I-280 near Millbury
- East end: SR 51 / CR 66 near Millbury

Location
- Country: United States
- State: Ohio
- Counties: Wood, Ottawa

Highway system
- Ohio State Highway System; Interstate; US; State; Scenic
← SR 794	→ SR 796

State Route 795 (SR 795) is an east–west state highway in northwestern Ohio, a U.S. state. The western terminus of SR 795 is at US 20 in Perrysburg, at the signalized intersection that doubles as the northern terminus of SR 199. Its eastern terminus is at a signalized intersection with SR 51 about 0.5 miles (0.80 km) southeast of Millbury.

SR 795, which was created in the late 1930s, serves a number of small towns in northern Wood County. From just west of its interchange with I-75 near Perrysburg to just west of its interchange with I-280 near Walbridge, the route is a four-lane divided highway. This four-lane section is used as an alternative to the Ohio Turnpike. In 2005 and 2006, SR 795 was one of the main detour routes for I-280 during the construction of the Maumee River Crossing. Along its path, SR 795 passes close to Toledo Executive Airport, a small airport near Walbridge.

== Route description ==
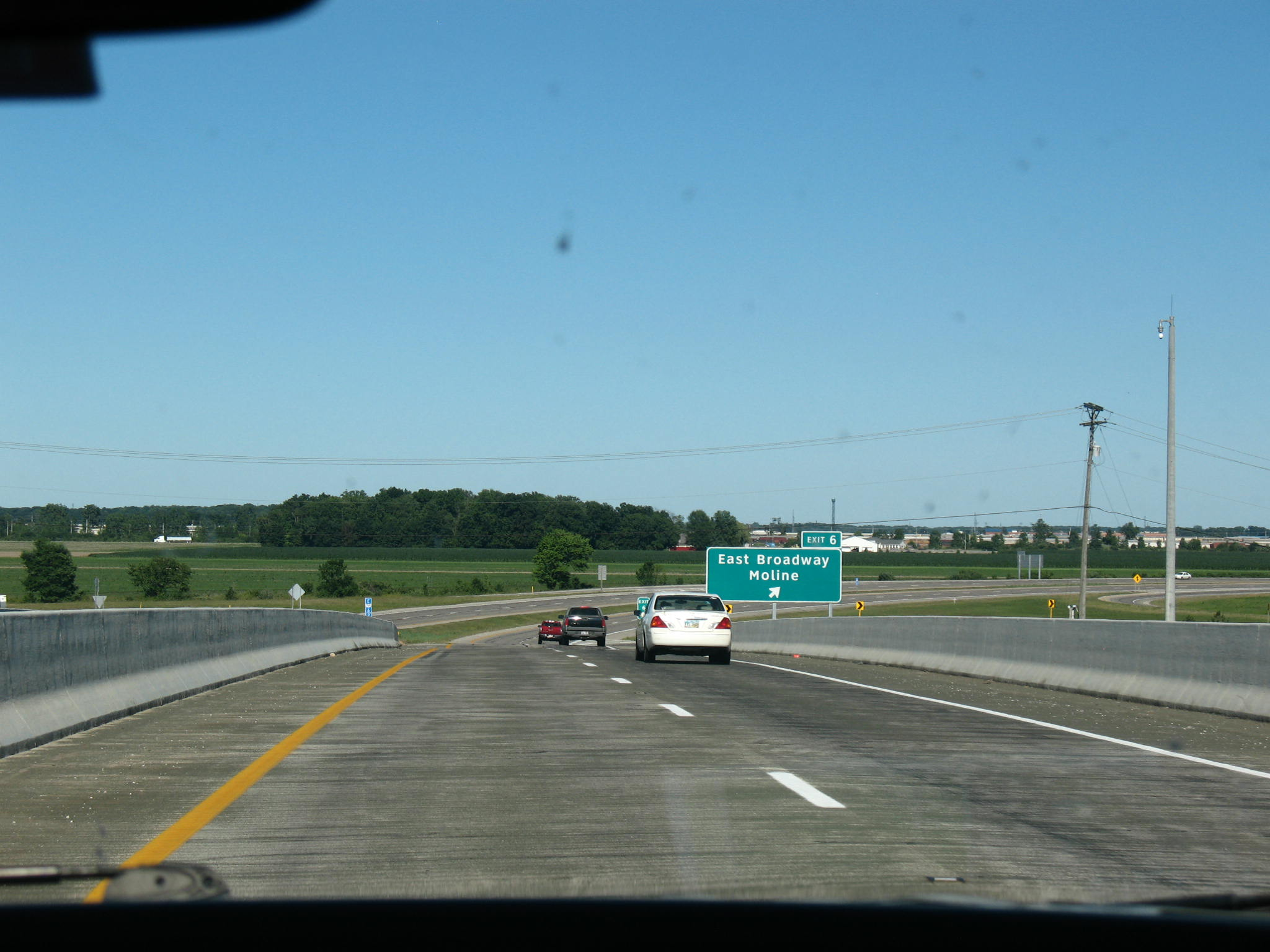
The interchange of Ohio State Route 795 and East Broadway in Moline

SR 795 runs through the northeastern corner of Wood County and a small portion of western Ottawa County. The segment of SR 795 that runs between I-75 and I-280 is included within the National Highway System, a system of highways that are determined to be the most important for the economy, mobility and defense of the country.

== History ==
SR 795 was designated in 1937. It was routed approximately along its current alignment between US 20 in Perrysburg and the former SR 102 (current SR 51) near Millbury. By 1971, the stretch of SR 795 from just west of I-75 to just west of the I-280 interchange was upgraded from two lanes to a four-lane divided expressway. This upgrade included the construction of viaducts over a pair of parallel railyards, as well as a parclo interchange at East Broadway Street (which previously conveyed the route between Indiana Avenue and Moline-Martin Road) in Moline.

== Major intersections ==
County	Location	mi	km	Exit	Destinations	Notes
Wood	Perrysburg	0.00	0.00		US 20 west / SR 199 south (Louisiana Avenue) / West Indiana Avenue	Western end of US 20 concurrency
Wood	Perrysburg	0.22	0.35		US 20 east (Sandusky Street) / Locust Avenue	Eastern end of US 20 concurrency
Wood	Rossford	2.27	3.65		I-75 to Wyandot Place / I-80 / I-90 / Ohio Turnpike – Dayton, Toledo	Exit 195 (I-75)
Wood	Lake Township	6.16	9.91	6	CR 10 (East Broadway Road)	Interchange
Wood	Lake Township	7.38	11.88		Luckey Road	Grade separation
Wood	Lake Township	9.06	14.58		I-280 – Cleveland, Toledo	Exit 2 (I-280)
Ottawa	Clay–Allen township line	12.20	19.63		SR 51 / CR 66 (Moline Martin Road) – Clay Center, Genoa, Elmore	
1.000 mi = 1.609 km; 1.000 km = 0.621 mi: Concurrency terminus
