= Rossford High School =

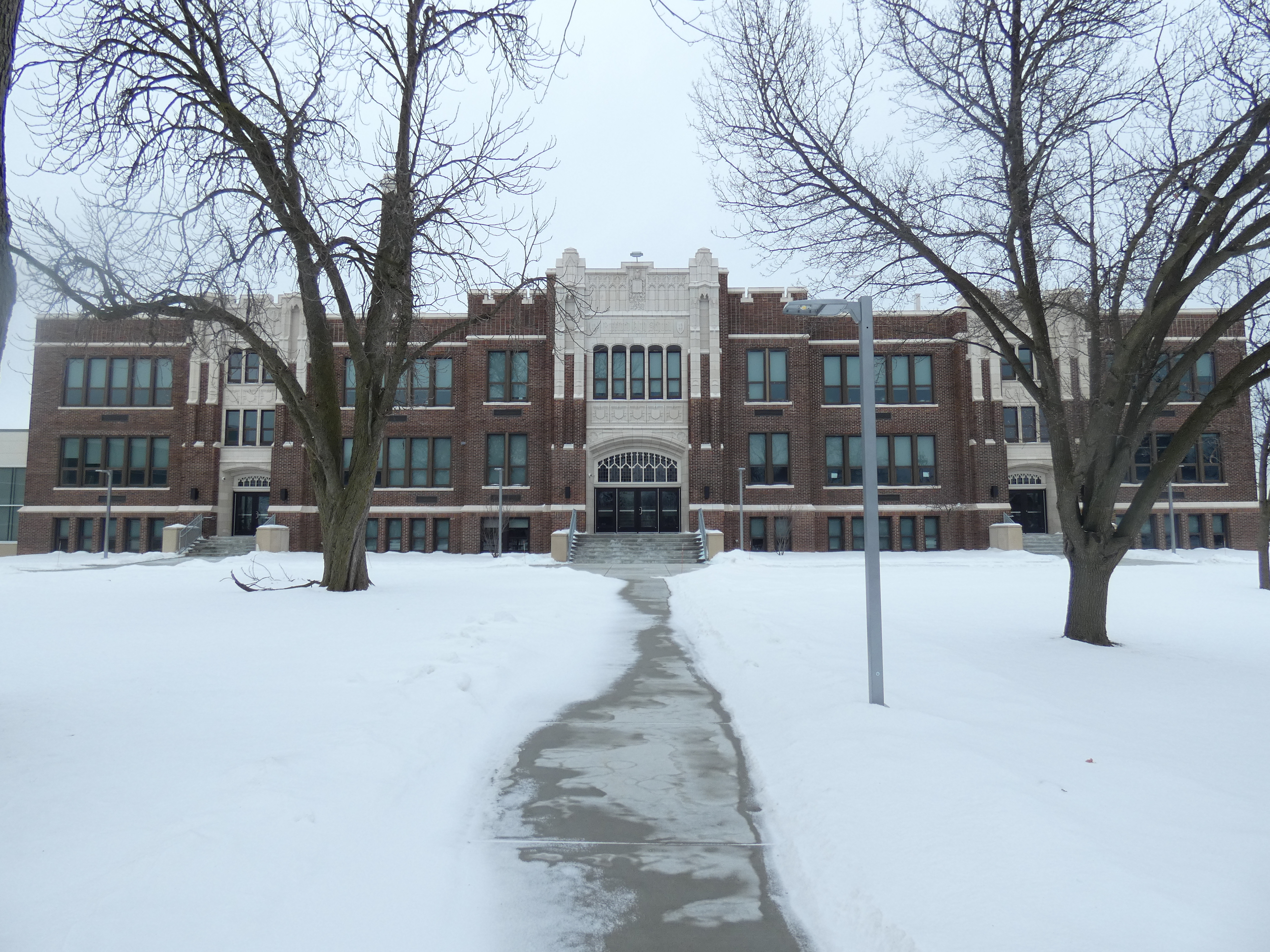
- School's main entrance

Location
- 701 Superior Street; Rossford, Ohio 43460; United States; 41°36′32″N 83°33′31″W

Information
- School district: Rossford Exempted Village School District
- Principal: Nick Neiderhouse
- Teaching staff: 26.00 (FTE)
- Grades: 9–12
- Student to teacher ratio: 15.85
- Colors: Maroon and gray
- Athletics conference: Northern Buckeye Conference
- Team name: Bulldogs
- Newspaper: Maroon Messenger
- Website: https://www.rossfordschools.org/JuniorSeniorHigh.aspx

Rossford High School is a public high school in Rossford, Ohio, United States. It is the only high school in the Rossford Exempted Village School District. The district mainly serves the city of Rossford and also includes parts of the city of Northwood, Perrysburg Township, and Lake Township within Wood County.

== History ==
The current high school was built in 1922 with its first class graduating in 1924. The George G. Wolfe Field House opened in 1950 to be used for indoor athletic events. In 1957 and 1958 respectively, Rossford absorbed the students that attended the Glenwood Elementary and Lime City Elementary school districts as a means of eliminating such jurisdictions across Ohio. The final addition to the high school was built in 1981.

Starting with the 2018–19 school year, Rossford students were temporarily housed at Owens Community College while the high school and middle school complex was upgraded, which was completed in early 2020. The refurbished building included technological improvements, areas for grades 6–8 and 9–12, and new gymnasiums for both high school and middle school use. It also retains the original structure from 1922.

Rossford High School in Ohio built a 2,000-square-foot indoor golf practice area with a synthetic putting green for year-round training.

== Athletics ==
State runners-up
Sport	Year(s)
Boys basketball	1966, 1970

Rossford sports teams are known as the Bulldogs with school colors of maroon and gray. Rossford was one of the founding members of the Northern Lakes League in 1956, but joined the Northern Buckeye Conference in 2011.

At the high school campus, basketball, volleyball, football, and the occasional soccer game are played. Baseball, softball, track & field, and soccer are played at the Rossford Elementary complex, almost 4 miles (6.4 km) south of the main campus.

Rossford's greatest athletic run to date came during the 1960s and 1970s when the Bulldogs secured numerous NLL titles in football, boys basketball, and baseball. Three trips were made to the final four for basketball, which included runner-up finishes in 1966 and 1970 and a semi-final appearance in 1975. Two trips were also made to the Final Four in Baseball in 1957 and 1965 bowing out in the semi-finals 1-0 to Doylestown and 11-2 to Shaker Heights respectively.

The Rossford football team has made nine appearances in the state playoffs, earning their first win with a come-from-behind victory in the first round of the 2015 Division V playoffs over Norwayne High School.

== Notable alumni ==
- Jonathan Bennett, actor
- Madalyn Murray O'Hair, founder of American Atheists
- Jim Penix, basketball player
- Dennis Richmond, former news anchor at KTVU
- Maurice A. Thompson, constitutional lawyer
