= Dominick Evans =

Polish-American filmmaker and activist

Dom Evans
- Born: M. Ławniczak; Toledo, Ohio
- Education: Wright State University, University of Michigan
- Occupations: Filmmaker, public speaker
- Known for: Filmmaking, disability rights and LGBT activism
- Website: www.domevansofficial.com

Dom Ławniczak Evans is a Polish-Irish-American filmmaker, streamer, public speaker, and social activist who focuses on LGBT rights and disability rights.

== Early life ==
Evans was born in Toledo, Ohio to a Polish-American father, David Ławniczak (d. 2001), who was deaf, and Irish-American mother, Pam Ryan. Dom grew up in Walbridge, Ohio with an older brother. They also have two half brothers from their father's first marriage who did not live with their family.

Evans had a contentious relationship with their parents, particularly their mother, which escalated when they came out at the age of 16. Their father died of heart failure in 2001. Evans was close with their grandparents Willis "Willie" and Melba "Noonie" Ryan, who helped raise Dom and their older brother. Their grandmother, Noonie, was a singer on the radio in Toledo and taught them to sing.

Dom was a child actor and singer, as well as a poster child for the Muscular Dystrophy Association, although they no longer supports the organization, claiming it does harm to the disabled community.

They attended Lake High School in Millbury, Ohio, where they graduated with honors in 1999. They had trouble finding the right college, where they were initially studying theater and acting. Dom originally attended Bowling Green State University while still in high school. They left BGSU in 2000 to attend Wright State University, but had to leave due to an injury. They returned to WSU in 2010, where they completed their BFA in Motion Pictures Production. They also spent a year studying theatre at a satellite school for the University of Michigan from 2009 to 2010.

Evans had a difficult childhood where they were bullied incessantly at school. In 2018, Dominick was featured in the book American Hate: Survivors Speak Out by community activist and professor Arjun Singh Sethi. His chapter explores an experience in high school where he was tortured by classmates as a part of a senior prank when he was a sophomore along with his fear of being outed publicly in his neighborhood.

== Career ==
=== Film/Directing ===
Evans completed their first film, trip, in 2013. It won a 2015 Indie Fest Award of Recognition. They have worked on other films including the short film, Nance + Sydney. As of 2026, they are currently developing television. Dom's work tends to be about marginalized individuals, and they work with diverse film crews that are predominantly made up of minority filmmakers.

As of 2019, they have been working in Hollywood with film, gaming and television studios, such as PBS Kids, Ubisoft, Lionsgate and Netflix, as an independent consultant.

They currently stream video games and web shows on Twitch.

In 2021, Dom directed the music video for the song "Spaces" by James Ian. Evans directed the video from home, where they were in bed, due to chronic pain. Evans believes that they have proven that disabled directors are capable of directing from any location. Their next goal is to develop a television show they can direct from home in Michigan.

=== Activism ===
Evans has been advocating for the disability community since youth. They have been heavily involved in the movement for better portrayals of transgender people and disability in film and other media, as well as the marriage equality movement for both LGBTQ and disabled people. They were invited to attend the White House's first forum on disability and LGBTQ issues in June 2014.

While in college, Evans studied disability in film, television, and other media. They were disturbed by what they felt was a huge lack of inclusion for disabled actors and filmmakers in the industry. They have made it a tenet of activism, speaking on the topic regularly, including at Lights, Camera, Access! 2.0 at New York University and John Jay College in July 2015 and mentoring disabled media, film, and communication students at the White House in November 2016 via the video robot ALF. Dominick is one of the few people to have the privilege of controlling a robot at the White House from across the country.

Dominick previously worked at the Center for Disability Rights in New York as a media and entertainment advocate.

In 2016, Dominick was involved in protests against the film Me Before You, a film in which a disabled man travels to Switzerland for assisted suicide.

Evans is a leading voice in the movement for marriage equality for people with disabilities. They worked with LGBTQ marriage equality activists in Ohio, to discuss the issue and its relations to the topic of LGBTQ marriage.

=== FilmDis ===
In 2014, Evans started the Twitter discussion #FilmDis, a then-monthly discussion that explored the problems with inclusion of those with disabilities, as well as portrayals of disability in film, television, and other media. Discussions have been attended by notable filmmakers, comic book writers, and actors. They also hosted the panel "Crip Culture and the Media – Perceptions of Disability in Film and Television" at New York Comic Con in 2015. In 2016, they returned to New York Comic Con via Skype for the panel "Where are the Wheelchairs?", which also included author and activist Day Al-Mohamed; model and activist Jillian Mercado; actress, comedian, and advocate Maysoon Zayid; and actor, comedian, and activist Steve Way.

In 2018, Evans and his creative partner, screenwriter, Ashtyn Law, announced that FilmDis was now a media monitoring group, and they would be releasing a study on disability representation in television. In May 2019, FilmDis released the first of three studies into disability representation on television. They also released a paper outlining the results.

In subsequent years, FilmDis has released two additional studies and papers. Both on disability representation in television. The first covers 2019 to 2020, and the second is a study examining shows airing between 2020 and 2022 called "The Pandemic Years Study."

Their work watching television, which had the duo watching as much as 250 shows a year themselves, has led to them working to develop television to try to address the problems their studies outlined. They are currently working to develop content through their production company, Electric Marshmallow Productions.

=== Honors ===
Evans was named one of eight "LGBT influencers you need to know in New York City" in the summer of 2016 by Time Out. Evans was named one of New Mobility's 2016 People of the Year for being part of a protest against assisted suicide.

== Personal life ==
Evans lives in the suburbs of Detroit, Michigan. They have worked primarily with their creative partner, Ashtyn Law, since 2002. Dominick has started consulting on scripts for studios such as Lionsgate and shows airing on networks like Netflix.

Evans was diagnosed with a degenerative neuromuscular disorder spinal muscular atrophy at age 4, and has had to use a wheelchair full-time since 1997. They also have asthma, chronic pain, ADD, OCD, PTSD, and are hard of hearing.

Evans is non-binary, transgender and queer, and uses both they/them and he/him pronouns.
