= Oak Harbor =

Oak Harbor is the name of some towns in the United States:

- Oak Harbor, Ohio
- Oak Harbor, Washington
