= Scotch Ridge, Ohio =

- Unincorporated community
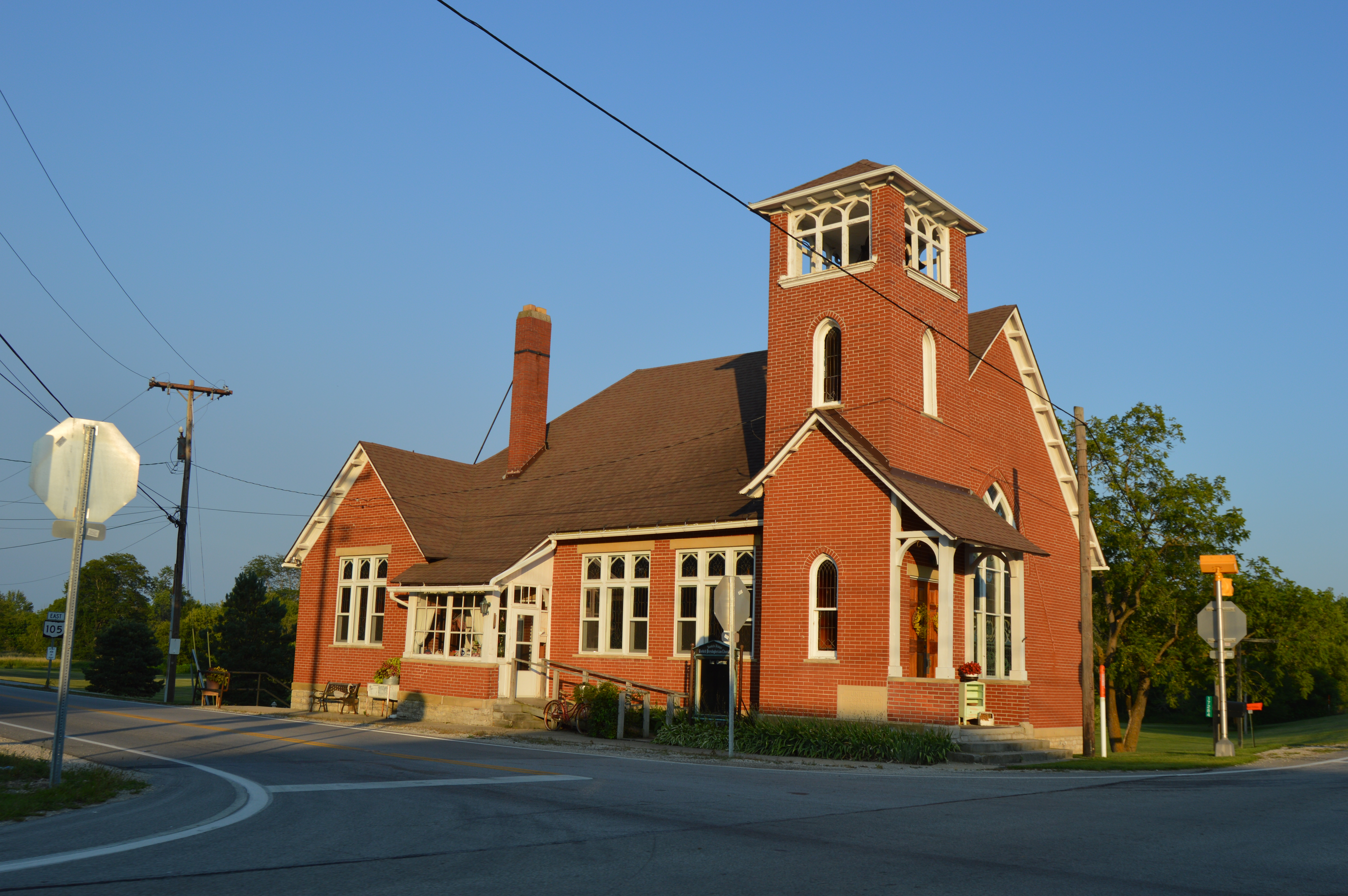
- The former Scotch Ridge United Presbyterian Church

- Location within Ohio Location within the United States
- Coordinates: 41°24′09″N 83°31′23″W
- Country: United States
- State: Ohio
- County: Wood
- Elevation: 659 ft (201 m)
- Time zone: UTC-5 (Eastern (EST))
  - Summer (DST): UTC-4 (EDT)
- Postal code: 43450
- Area codes: 419 & 567
- GNIS feature ID: 1084140

Scotch Ridge is an unincorporated community in Wood County, Ohio, United States. It is part of Webster Township and located at the intersection of OH 199 and OH 105.

Scotch Ridge is part of the Eastwood Local School District.

A post office called Scotch Ridge was established in 1850, and remained in operation until 1926. The community derives its name from Scotland, the ancestral home of a large share of the first settlers.

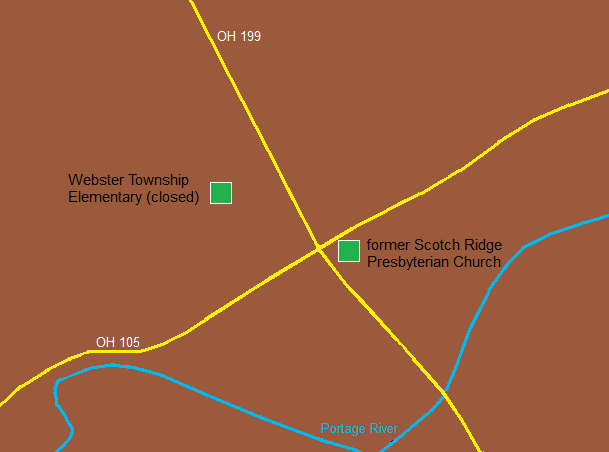
General vicinity of Scotch Ridge, Ohio
