= Oak Harbor High School =

Oak Harbor High School may refer to:

- Oak Harbor High School (Washington) in Oak Harbor, Washington
- Oak Harbor High School (Ohio) in Oak Harbor, Ohio
