= Perrysburg Township, Wood County, Ohio =

Township in Ohio, US

- Township
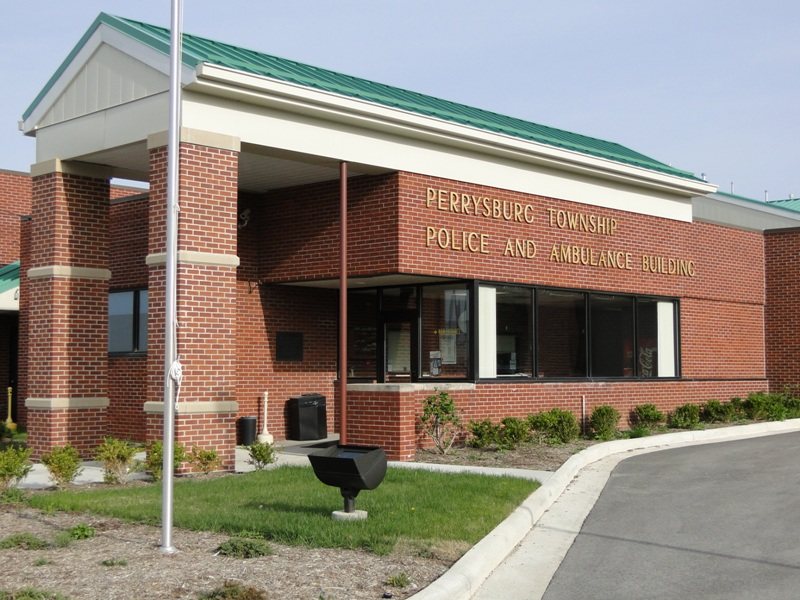
- Perrysburg Township Police/Fire/EMS building

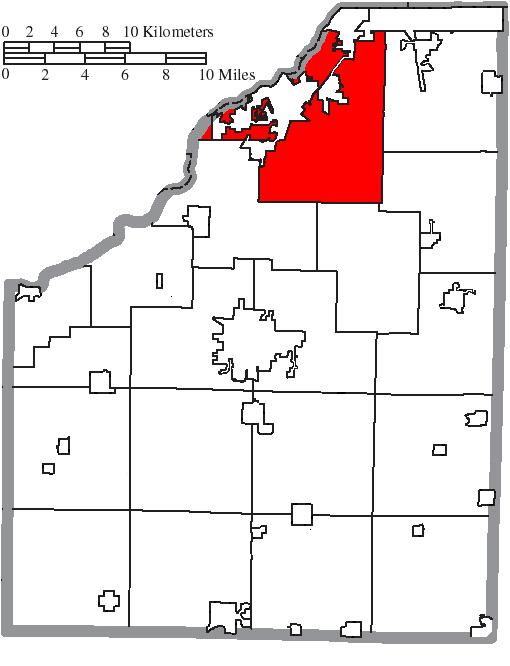
- Location of Perrysburg Township in Wood County
- Coordinates: 41°32′50″N 83°35′21″W
- Country: United States
- State: Ohio
- County: Wood

Area
  - Total: 40.1 sq mi (103.9 km^{2})
  - Land: 39.3 sq mi (101.8 km^{2})
  - Water: 0.81 sq mi (2.1 km^{2})
- Elevation: 633 ft (193 m)

Population (2020)
  - Total: 13,571
  - Density: 345/sq mi (133.3/km^{2})
- Time zone: UTC-5 (Eastern (EST))
  - Summer (DST): UTC-4 (EDT)
- ZIP codes: 43551-43552
- Area code: 419
- FIPS code: 39-62162
- GNIS feature ID: 1087194
- Website: perrysburgtownship.us

Perrysburg Township is one of the nineteen townships of Wood County, Ohio, United States. The 2020 census found 13,571 people in the township.

== Geography ==
Perrysburg Township is located in northern Wood County, surrounding the crossroads of I-75 and the Ohio Turnpike, ten miles south of the City of Toledo, Ohio. At one time Perrysburg Township was Ohio's largest township, geographically, with 49 square miles; due to annexation the square mileage is now approximately 40.

Perrysburg Township borders the following townships and municipalities:

- Rossford - north
- Northwood - northeast
- Lake Township - east
- Troy Township - southeast
- Webster Township - south
- Middleton Township - southwest
- Perrysburg - northwest

== Name and history ==
Established on May 8, 1823, it is the oldest township in Wood County.

It is the only Perrysburg Township statewide. Perrysburg Township was named after the City of Perrysburg (created in 1816), which in turn was named for Commodore Oliver Hazard Perry, who fought in the War of 1812 and won a decisive victory at the Battle of Lake Erie.

== Government ==
The township is governed by a three-member board of trustees, who are elected in November of odd-numbered years to a four-year term beginning on the following January 1. Two are elected in the year after the presidential election and one is elected in the year before it. There is also an elected township fiscal officer, who serves a four-year term beginning on April 1 of the year after the election, which is held in November of the year before the presidential election. Vacancies in the fiscal officership or on the board of trustees are filled by the remaining trustees.

The current elected officials of Perrysburg Township are:

- Gary Britten, Trustee: term ends December 2025
- Robert Mack, Trustee: term ends December 2025
- Joseph Schaller, Trustee: term ends December 2027
- Gretchen Welch, Fiscal Officer

Board of trustees meetings, which are open to the public, are held on the 1st and 3rd Wednesdays at 4:00 p.m. at the Township Building.

Perrysburg Township offices are composed of the following: Administration, Emergency Medical Services, Fire, Police, Recreation, Road Maintenance, and Zoning.

== Demographics ==
=== 2020 census ===
Perrysburg Township racial composition
Race	Number	Percentage
White (NH)	10,627	78.3%
Black or African American (NH)	345	2.54%
Native American (NH)	27	0.20%
Asian (NH)	522	3.85%
Pacific Islander (NH)	0	0%
Other/mixed	1,169	8.61%
Hispanic or Latino	881	6.49%

== Education ==
=== Primary and secondary education ===
There are four school districts whose boundaries include parts of Perrysburg Township:

- Eastwood Local School District
- Lake Local School District
- Perrysburg Exempted Village School District
- Rossford Exempted Village School District

Perrysburg Township is also home to Penta Career Center, a vocational high school, serving five counties and sixteen school districts.

A full-time Islamic school is located on the grounds of the Greater Toledo Islamic Center in Perrysburg Township.

=== Higher education ===
- Owens Community College

== Commerce and industry ==
Perrysburg Township is home to:

- Ampoint Industrial Park
- Cedar Business Park
- FCA US LLC (formerly Chrysler) Toledo Machining Plant
- FedEx Distribution Center
- First Solar Inc.
- Walgreens Distribution Center
