= Rossford Exempted Village School District =

School district in Ohio, United States

Address
- 701 Superior Street Rossford, Ohio, 43460; United States
- Coordinates: 41°35′37″N 83°34′5″W

District information
- Type: Public
- Grades: PK–12
- Superintendent: Dan Creps
- School board: Tiffany Densic - President Teresa McKnight - Vice President Dawn Burks - Member Lori Frymire - Member Emily Klocko - Member
- Schools: 3
- NCES District ID: 3904560

Students and staff
- Students: 1,560 (2024–2025)
- Teachers: 91.45 (on an FTE basis) (2024–2025)
- Staff: 231.24 (on an FTE basis) (2024–2025)
- Student–teacher ratio: 17.06 (2024–2025)
- District mascot: Bulldogs
- Colors: Red, Gray

Other information
- Website: www.rossfordschools.org

Rossford Public Schools is a school district in Northwest Ohio. The school district serves students who live in the communities of Rossford, Northwood, Perrysburg, Perrysburg Township, and Lake Township located in Wood County. The superintendent is Dan Creps.

== Schools ==
=== Grades 9-12 ===
- Rossford High School - 701 Superior St. The current building opened in 2020.

=== Grades 6-8 ===
- Rossford Junior High School - 651 Superior St. Was temporarily housed at Indian Hills Elementary until Spring 2020 until the current building was completed.

=== Grades K-5 ===
- Rossford Elementary - 28500 Lime City Rd. Opened as the K-5th grade building beginning with the 2019–20 school year.

=== Former elementary schools ===
- Alter Elementary - 721 Dixie Hwy. (a Catholic school within Rossford's district, it was consolidated in 1973 by the merger of the parish schools at St. Mary Magdalene (721 Dixie Hwy.) and Sts. Cyril and Methodius (124 Maple St.) Alter became All Saints Catholic School when the church parishes merged in 1991 and was demolished in 1999 after the school had moved to 630 Lime City Rd. in Rossford.)
- Eagle Point Elementary - 203 Eagle Point Rd. (opened in 1929) Was a Pre K-6 building until 2014 when it housed grades 3-5 after the district restructured its elementary school setup for the 2014–15 school year. Closed in 2019.
- Glenwood Elementary - 8950 Avenue Rd. (current building opened in 1929) Annexed by Rossford in 1957, Glenwood was a Pre K-6 building until 2014 when it housed grades Pre K-2 until its closure and demolition in 2019.
- Indian Hills Elementary - 401 Glenwood Rd. (opened in 1970, former Pre K-6 school closed after the 2013–14 school year.)
- Lime City School - 26431 Lime City Rd, Perrysburg 43551 (annexed by Rossford in 1958, the building was temporarily closed in 1982 and never reopened.) Lime City was a "sister" school to Glenwood, usually only having a few grades within the building.
- Walnut Street School - Walnut St. at Beech St. (built in 1914, closed Feb. 1, 1970 when Indian Hills opened.) Became a civic center before it was demolished.

== Career center ==
Rossford's school district is also the location for the Penta Career Center at 9301 Buck Rd. Along with Rossford, it serves 15 other school districts across five counties.
