= North Baltimore Local School District =

School district in Ohio, United States

Address
- 201 S Main St North Baltimore, Ohio, 45872; United States
- Coordinates: 41°10′55″N 83°40′28″W

District information
- Type: Public school district
- Motto: "Inspire, Create, Achieve, A Community of Excellence"
- Grades: K–12
- Established: 1927
- Schools: 3
- NCES District ID: 3905070

Students and staff
- Students: 609 (2023–24)
- Teachers: 54.46 (FTE)
- Student–teacher ratio: 11.18

Other information
- Website: www.nbls.org

North Baltimore Local School District is a school district in Northwest Ohio, United States. The school district serves students who live in the city of North Baltimore in Wood County. The superintendent is Ryan Delaney. The district is affiliated with Penta Career Center.

== Schools ==
There are three schools.

- E A Powell Elementary School (K–6)
- North Baltimore Middle School (7–8)
- North Baltimore High School (9–12)
