= Lake Local School District (Wood County) =

School district in Ohio

Coordinates: 41°33′50″N 83°25′27″W

Location
- Millbury, Ohio; U.S.

District information
- Type: Public
- Motto: "Prepare, Motivate, and Challenge"

Students and staff
- Students: Grades K–12

Other information
- Website: http://www.lakeschools.org/

Lake Local School District is a public school district in Northwest Ohio. The school district primarily serves students who live in Lake Township and the villages of Millbury and Walbridge in Wood County. It also includes small portions of Perrysburg, Troy, and Allen townships and a small portion of the city of Northwood. The superintendent is Jim Witt.

Lake Local was created in 1953 with the merger of the Lake Township and Walbridge school districts.

== Grades 9–12 ==
- Lake High School

== Grades 6–8 ==
- Lake Middle School

== Grades K–5 ==
- Lake Elementary (grades 2–5)
- Walbridge Elementary (grades K–1)
