= Eastwood High School (Ohio) =

Location
- 4900 Sugar Ridge Road; Pemberville, Ohio 43450; United States
- Coordinates: 41°25′0″N 83°29′27″W

Information
- School type: Public
- School district: Eastwood Local School District
- Principal: Jim Kieper
- Teaching staff: 27.33 (FTE)
- Grades: 9-12
- Student to teacher ratio: 14.34
- Hours in school day: 7.5
- Campus type: Rural
- Colors: Red, white, and Columbia blue
- Athletics conference: Northern Buckeye Conference
- Mascot: Eagles
- Accreditation: North Central Association of Colleges and Secondary Schools
- Newspaper: The Eagle's Eye
- Yearbook: The Aquila
- Communities served: Pemberville, Luckey, Stony Ridge, Sugar Ridge, Dowling, and Dunbridge
- Website: ehs.eastwoodschools.org

Eastwood High School is a public high school located in Troy Township, in between the villages of Pemberville and Luckey in the U.S. State of Ohio. It is the only high school in the Eastwood Local School District, which covers parts of eastern Wood County, and holds grades nine through twelve. The school colors are red, white, and Columbia blue and it competes in the Northern Buckeye Conference for athletics. Eastwood is affiliated with the Penta Career Center.

== Library ==
The high school library is available for use of the students before school and in Academic Assist. It may also be used during a class with permission from a teacher. The library also serves as the computer lab in the high school. Beginning in the 2007-2008 school year the school district hired a district computer administrator. With the hiring of this individual came a new school network. Students have usernames and passwords to use the computers. They can save homework, papers, and projects to the school network instead of the hard drive.

== Athletics ==
Eastwood High School has a variety of athletics for its students to participate in. The school's mascot is the American bald eagle. The school was a member of the Suburban Lakes League, but joined the Northern Buckeye Conference in fall 2011 as the SLL dissipated at the end of the spring 2011 season.

- Fall sports: Cheerleading (football), cross country, football, soccer, marching band, volleyball, and golf
- Winter sports: Hockey (club team), basketball, intramurals (basketball), dance team, cheerleading (basketball), swimming, and wrestling
- Spring sports: Track, baseball, and softball

=== State championships ===
- Boys Baseball – 1939
- Girls Volleyball – 1993
- Girls Bowling - 2009
- Boys Track and Field - 2009, 2010

== Clubs and organizations ==
Students at Eastwood high school have an opportunity to participate in many clubs and organizations.

Students who are enrolled in Agricultural Education at Eastwood High School are part of the Eastwood Local FFA Chapter. Member participate in various activities and Career Development Events. Members of the Eastwood FFA Chapter also have an opportunity to become Officers.
