= Perrysburg High School =

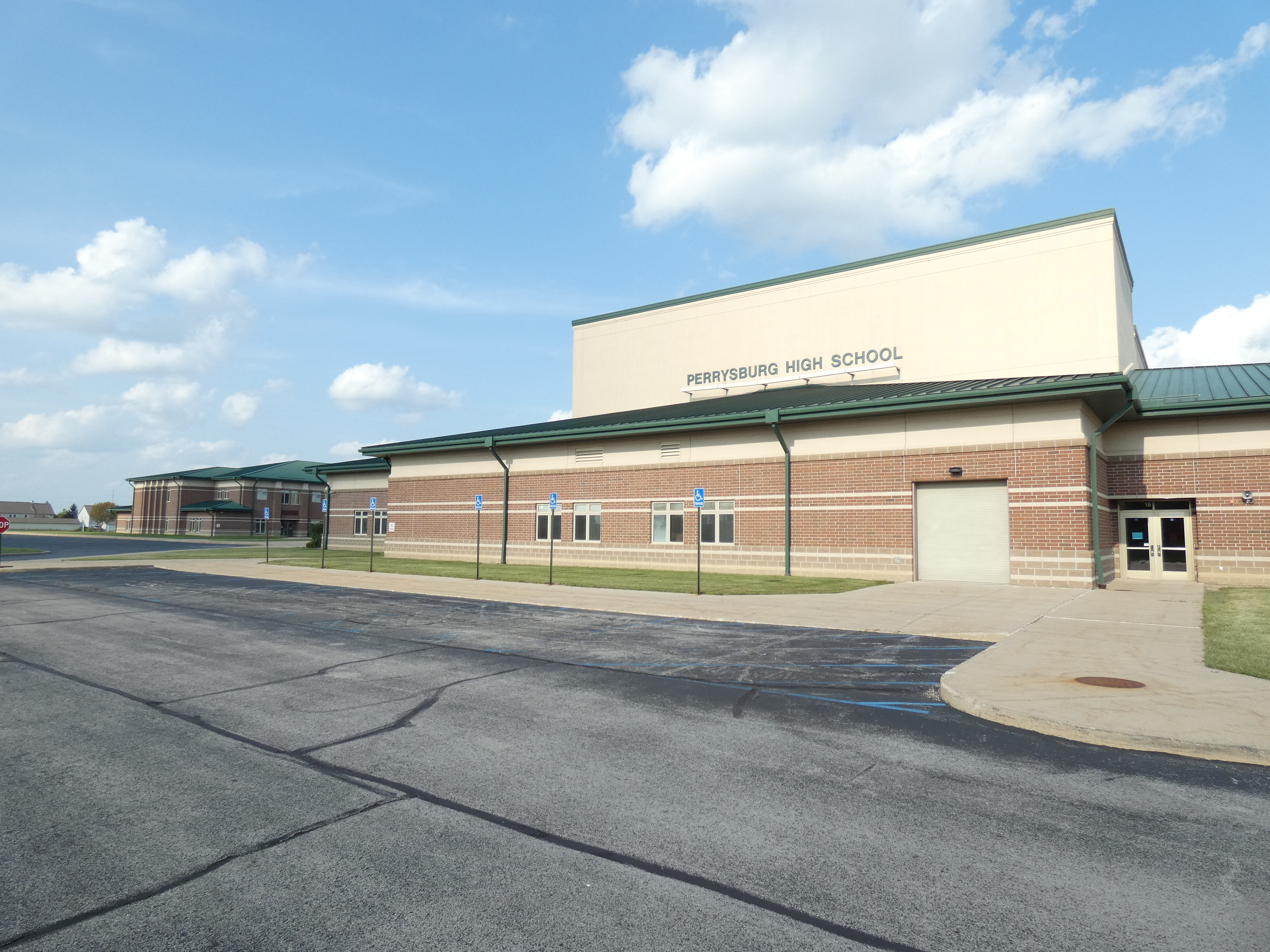
- Front portion of the school

Location
- 13385 Roachton Rd; Perrysburg, Ohio 43551; United States; 41°31′09″N 83°39′11″W

Information
- Type: Public
- Established: 1849
- School district: Perrysburg Exempted Village School District
- Principal: Justin Fults
- Staff: 88.00 (FTE)
- Grades: 9–12
- Enrollment: 1,676
- Student to teacher ratio: 18.76
- Colors: Black and Gold
- Athletics conference: Northern Lakes League
- Team name: Yellow Jackets
- Accreditation: Blue Ribbon 2014
- Website: www.perrysburgschools.net/perrysburghighschool_home.aspx

Perrysburg High School is a public high school in Perrysburg, Ohio, United States.

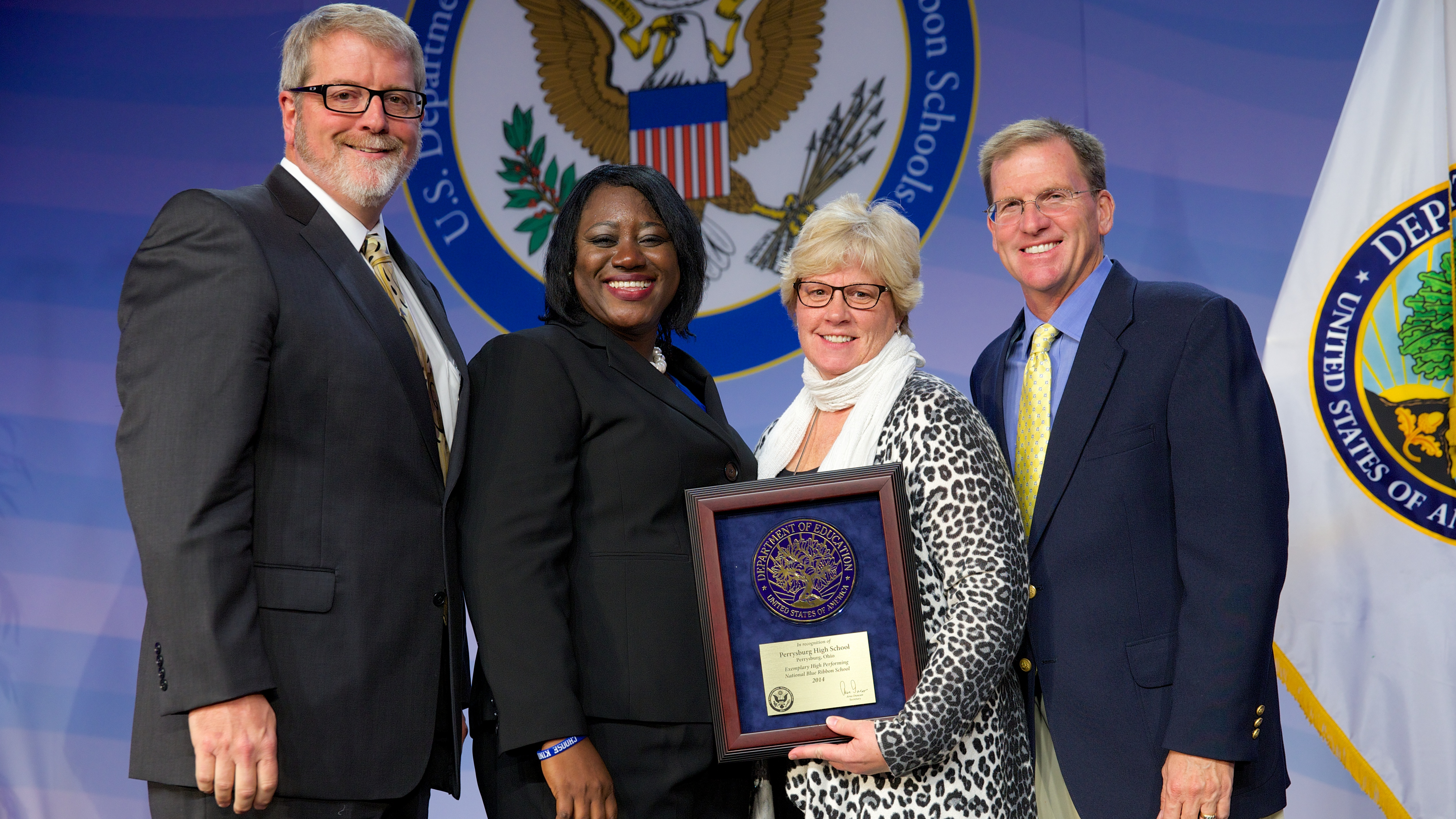
2014 National Blue Ribbon Schools Winner

It is the only high school in Perrysburg Exempted Village School District (Perrysburg Schools).

== History ==
Perrysburg High School was established in 1849. The school had its first graduating class in 1866. It moved into its current building on Roachton Road in the fall of 2001.

== Athletics ==
The school's athletic teams are known as the Yellow Jackets with school colors of black and gold and the school competes as a member of the Northern Lakes League.

== State championships ==
- Boys Wrestling – 2026
- Girls Softball – 1991
- Girls Volleyball – 1979
- Girls Soccer – 2012
- Girls Cross Country – 2021, 2023

== Notable alumni ==
- Burke Badenhop, baseball pitcher
- Joseph E. Baird, politician
- Marcus Blaze, wrestler
- Douglas Brinkley, historian & writer
- Hayden Carroll, professional disc golfer
- T. J. Fatinikun, football player
- Jerry Glanville, football coach
- Rick Hill, actor, author and football player
- Sam Jaeger, actor
- Kate Wetzel Jameson, educator
- Lance K. Landrum, United States Air Force lieutenant general
- Jim Leyland, baseball manager
- Anna Tobias, 2008 Olympic Gold Medalist
