= Woodmore High School =

Location
- 633 Fremont Street; Elmore, Ohio 43416; United States
- 41°28′20″N 83°17′23″W

Information
- Type: Public
- Established: 1968
- School district: Woodmore Local School District
- Superintendent: Dennis Mock
- Principal: Loretta Coil
- Grades: 9–12
- Colors: Navy blue and Gold
- Athletics conference: Sandusky Bay Conference
- Mascot: Woody Wildcat
- Team name: Wildcats
- Website: woodmoreschools.com

Woodmore High School is a public high school in Elmore, Ohio, United States. It is the only high school in the Woodmore Local School District, which also serves Woodville, Ohio. Athletic teams are known as the Wildcats with school colors of navy blue and gold. They were founding members of the Suburban Lakes League in 1971, then joined the Northern Buckeye Conference in 2011, and the Sandusky Bay Conference in 2023. Woodmore was established in 1968 with the consolidation of Woodville High School and Harris-Elmore High School, and the school name is a portmanteau of the two community names.

== State championships ==
- Boys golf – 1979, 1981
- Girls cross country – 1992, 1993, 1994
- Girls track and field – 1993 2023

== Notable alumni ==
- Terence T. Henricks, colonel in the United States Air Force and NASA astronaut with four Space Shuttle missions
