= Maurice A. Thompson =

American lawyer

- Organization: 1851 Center for Constitutional Law (Executive Director)

Maurice A. Thompson is an American lawyer. He serves as the executive director of the 1851 Center for Constitutional Law, a free market-oriented legal advocacy group in Ohio. The 1851 Center for Constitutional Law began as a project of the Buckeye Institute but was ultimately spun off as a separate organization. Thompson wrote Issue 3, the constitutional amendment approved by Ohio voters in November 2011.
