= Oak Harbor High School (Ohio) =

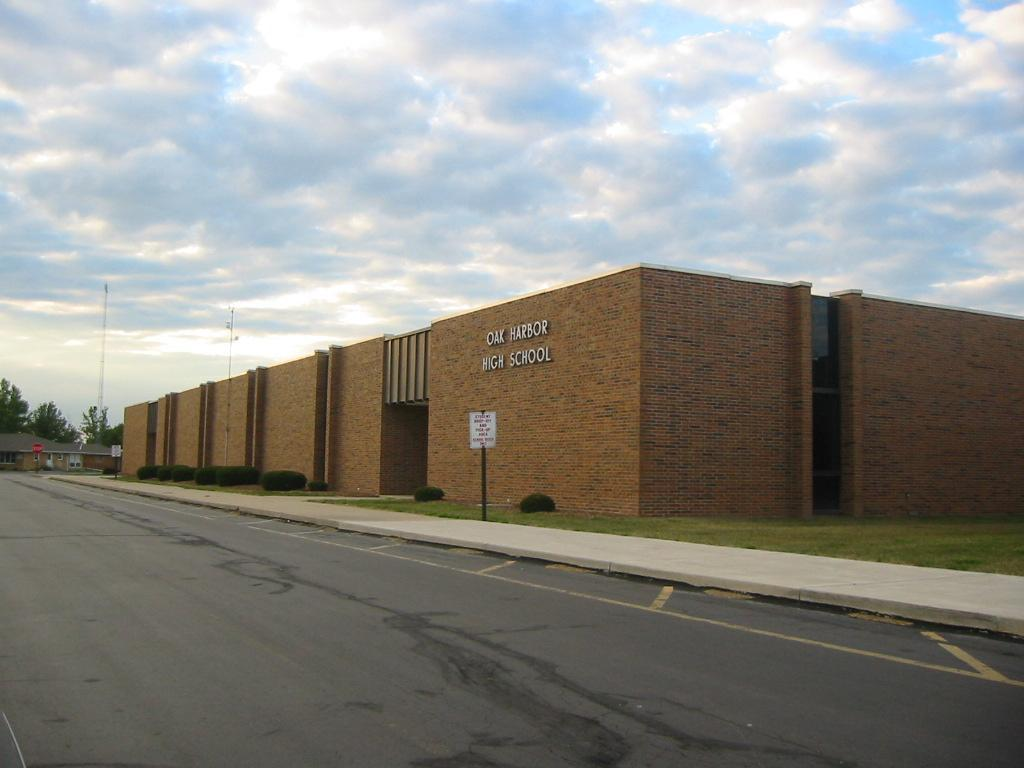

Location
- 11661 West State Route 163; Oak Harbor, Ohio 43449; United States; 41°30′50″N 83°09′24″W

Information
- Type: Public High School
- Established: 1919
- School district: Benton-Carroll-Salem Local School District
- Principal: Lauren Cummings
- Grades: 8–12
- Colors: Red, Green, and White
- Athletics conference: Northern Buckeye Conference
- Team name: Rockets
- Affiliation: Penta Career Center
- Website: Oak Harbor H.S.

Oak Harbor High School is a public high school located in Oak Harbor, Ohio, United States. It is the only high school in the Benton-Carroll-Salem Schools district. Their athletic teams are known as the Rockets, and their school colors are red and green.

The student graduation rate in 2005-06 was 92.4 percent, down from 96.8 percent in 2004–05. In the 2006–2007 school year, the high school received an excellent rating from the Ohio Department of Education.

== Athletics ==
Oak Harbor High School competes in the Northern Buckeye Conference in various sports.

=== Boys ===
- Football
- Golf
- Soccer
- Cross Country
- Basketball
- Wrestling
- Swimming/Diving
- Baseball
- Track/Field
- Tennis

=== Girls ===
- Cross Country
- Volleyball
- Soccer
- Golf
- Basketball
- Swimming/Diving
- Softball
- Track/Field
- Tennis
- Cheerleading
