= Bloomdale, Ohio =

- Village
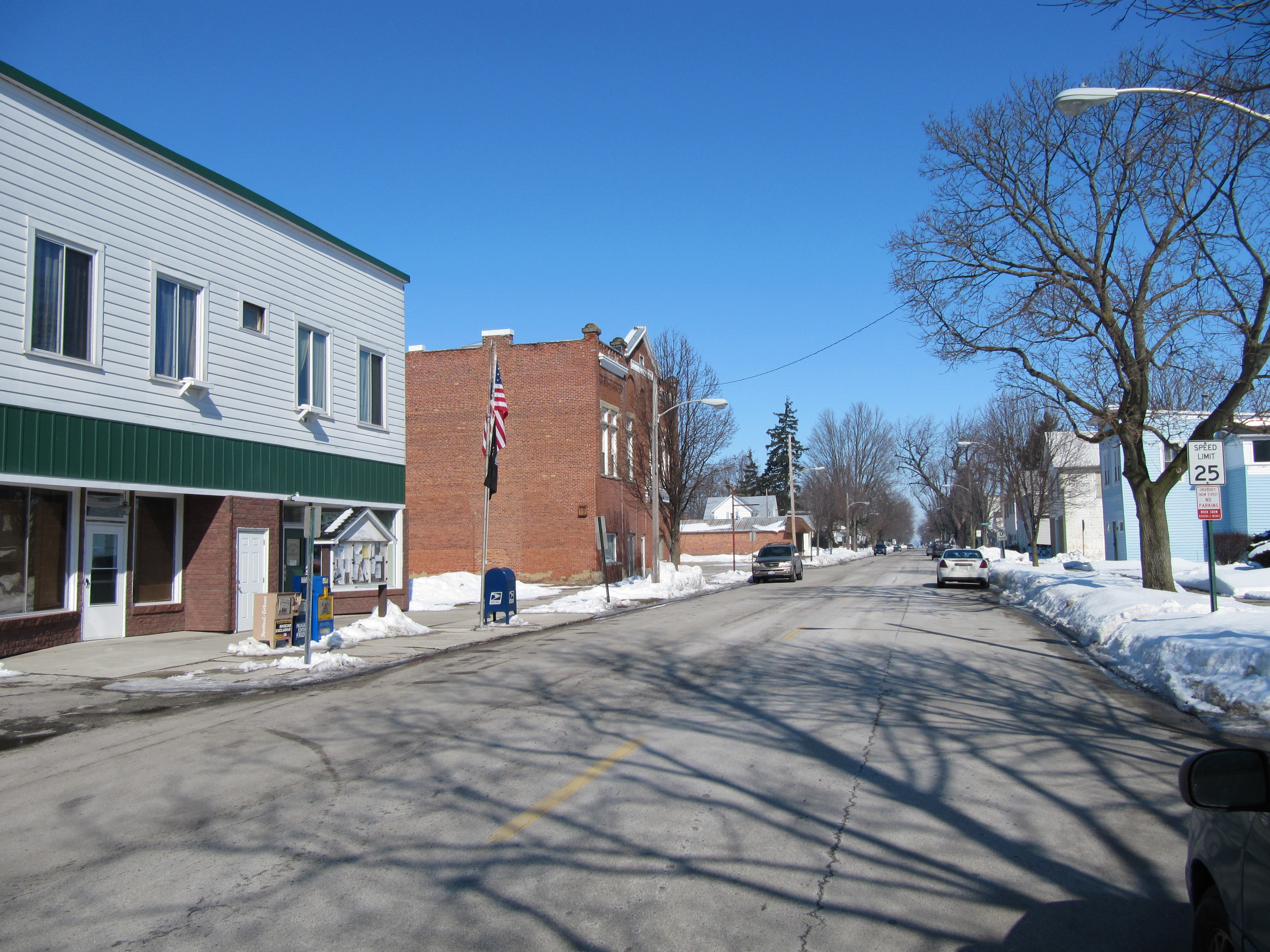
- Main Street in downtown Bloomdale, Ohio, showing the former post office.

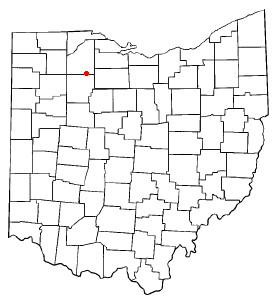
- Location of Bloomdale, Ohio

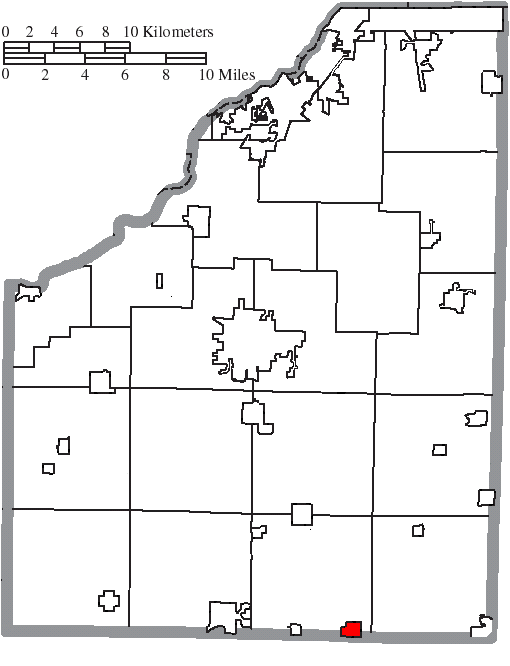
- Location of Bloomdale in Wood County
- Coordinates: 41°10′18″N 83°33′12″W
- Country: United States
- State: Ohio
- County: Wood
- Township: Bloom

Government
  - Mayor: Bethany Vincent

Area
  - Total: 0.67 sq mi (1.73 km^{2})
  - Land: 0.66 sq mi (1.72 km^{2})
  - Water: 0.0039 sq mi (0.01 km^{2})
- Elevation: 745 ft (227 m)

Population (2020)
  - Total: 665
  - Estimate (2023): 655
  - Density: 1,000.1/sq mi (386.15/km^{2})
- Time zone: UTC-5 (Eastern (EST))
  - Summer (DST): UTC-4 (EDT)
- ZIP code: 44817
- Area code: 419
- FIPS code: 39-07062
- GNIS feature ID: 2398135
- Website: https://villageofbloomdale.com/

Bloomdale is a village in Wood County, Ohio, United States. The population was 665 at the 2020 census.

== History ==
Bloomdale had its start when the Baltimore and Ohio Railroad was extended to that point. The village was platted in 1852, and given its commendatory name. A post office in Bloomdale was in operation from 1874 until March 2019. Bloomdale was incorporated in 1887.

== Geography ==
According to the United States Census Bureau, the village has a total area of 0.67 square miles (1.74 km^{2}), all land.

== Demographics ==
Historical population
Census	Pop.	Note	%±
1880	130		—
1890	419		222.3%
1900	740		76.6%
1910	602		−18.6%
1920	509		−15.4%
1930	578		13.6%
1940	575		−0.5%
1950	592		3.0%
1960	669		13.0%
1970	727		8.7%
1980	744		2.3%
1990	632		−15.1%
2000	724		14.6%
2010	678		−6.4%
2020	665		−1.9%
2023 (est.)	655	▼	−1.5%
U.S. Decennial Census

=== 2010 census ===
As of the census of 2010, there were 678 people, 244 households, and 197 families living in the village. The population density was 1,011.9 inhabitants per square mile (390.7/km^{2}). There were 270 housing units at an average density of 403.0 per square mile (155.6/km^{2}). The racial makeup of the village was 98.1% White, 0.3% Asian, 0.3% from other races, and 1.3% from two or more races. Hispanic or Latino of any race were 2.7% of the population.

There were 244 households, of which 43.0% had children under the age of 18 living with them, 66.0% were married couples living together, 9.8% had a female householder with no husband present, 4.9% had a male householder with no wife present, and 19.3% were non-families. 14.8% of all households were made up of individuals, and 3.7% had someone living alone who was 65 years of age or older. The average household size was 2.78 and the average family size was 3.06.

The median age in the village was 36.4 years. 28.2% of residents were under the age of 18; 7.3% were between the ages of 18 and 24; 26.6% were from 25 to 44; 26.3% were from 45 to 64; and 11.7% were 65 years of age or older. The gender makeup of the village was 51.8% male and 48.2% female.

=== 2000 census ===
As of the census of 2000, there were 724 people, 256 households, and 201 families living in the village. The population density was 1,082.6 inhabitants per square mile (418.0/km^{2}). There were 267 housing units at an average density of 399.3 per square mile (154.2/km^{2}). The racial makeup of the village was 97.93% White, 0.28% Native American, 0.41% Asian, 0.55% from other races, and 0.83% from two or more races. Hispanic or Latino of any race were 1.66% of the population.

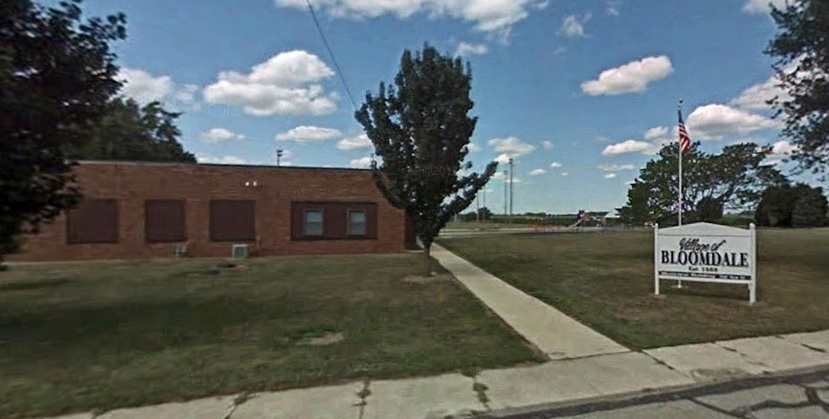
Bloomdale Village Hall

There were 256 households, out of which 41.4% had children under the age of 18 living with them, 64.1% were married couples living together, 11.3% had a female householder with no husband present, and 21.1% were non-families. 18.0% of all households were made up of individuals, and 9.0% had someone living alone who was 65 years of age or older. The average household size was 2.83 and the average family size was 3.23.

In the village, the population was spread out, with 30.7% under the age of 18, 9.7% from 18 to 24, 33.0% from 25 to 44, 18.6% from 45 to 64, and 8.0% who were 65 years of age or older. The median age was 32 years. For every 100 females there were 100.0 males. For every 100 females age 18 and over, there were 96.9 males.

The median income for a household in the village was $41,053, and the median income for a family was $45,625. Males had a median income of $32,411 versus $24,792 for females. The per capita income for the village was $16,342. About 2.5% of families and 3.7% of the population were below the poverty line, including 5.4% of those under age 18 and none of those age 65 or over.

== Education ==
It is in the Elmwood Local School District. The district operates one elementary school, one middle school, and Elmwood High School.

== Notable people ==
- Chris Hoiles, MLB Baltimore Orioles
- Gus Wasson, NASCAR driver
