= Perrysburg Exempted Village School District =

School district in Ohio, United States

Address
- 140 East Indiana Avenue Perrysburg, Ohio, 43551; United States
- Coordinates: 41°33′1″N 83°37′48″W

District information
- Type: Public
- Motto: "Ensuring all students achieve their greatest potential"
- Grades: PreK–12
- Established: 1849; 177 years ago
- Schools: 8
- NCES District ID: 3904558

Students and staff
- Students: 5,584 (2024–2025)
- Teachers: 318.95 (on an FTE basis) (2024–2025)
- Staff: 626.49 (on an FTE basis) (2024–2025)
- Student–teacher ratio: 17.51 (2024–2025)

Other information
- Website: www.perrysburgschools.net

Perrysburg Exempted Village School District, or Perrysburg Schools, is located in Northwest Ohio, USA. The district has a total enrollment of over 5,700 students attending eight school buildings in an area of 28 square miles. Perrysburg High School was named a 2014 National Blue Ribbon School.

Perrysburg Schools is the second largest employer in the area, after Owens-Illinois. The superintendent is Thomas L. Hosler. The district offer academic, fine and performing arts, and athletic programs. In 2001, the school rating website Niche gave the district an A+ grade and ranked it 24th Ohio among suburbs with the best public schools.

Perrysburg Schools has been named among the “Best Communities for Music Education” every year since 2007. Perrysburg High School, Perrysburg Junior High School and Hull Prairie Intermediate School have earned the Ohio Department of Education's Purple Star designation, recognizing the schools’ commitment to serving military-connected students and families. The Class of 2021 was offered $21.8 Million in scholarship awards. The average teacher experience is 12 years and 72% of teachers hold a master's degree or higher.

Over 20 Advanced Placement and honors classes are offered at Perrysburg High School. The district's elementary schools have robust technology integration.

The school district serves students who live in the city of Perrysburg and parts of Perrysburg Township and Middleton Township, all in Wood County.

The mascot is the Yellow Jacket and the colors are black and gold. The sports teams are commonly referred to as the Jackets.

== Schools ==
=== Grades 9-12 ===
- Perrysburg High School

=== Grades 7-8 ===
- Perrysburg Junior High School

=== Grades 5-6 ===
- Hull Prairie Intermediate School

=== Grades K-4 ===
- Fort Meigs Elementary
- Frank Elementary
- Toth Elementary
- Woodland Elementary

=== Preschool ===
- Perrysburg Preschool
