= Lake Township, Wood County, Ohio =

Township in Ohio, US

- Township
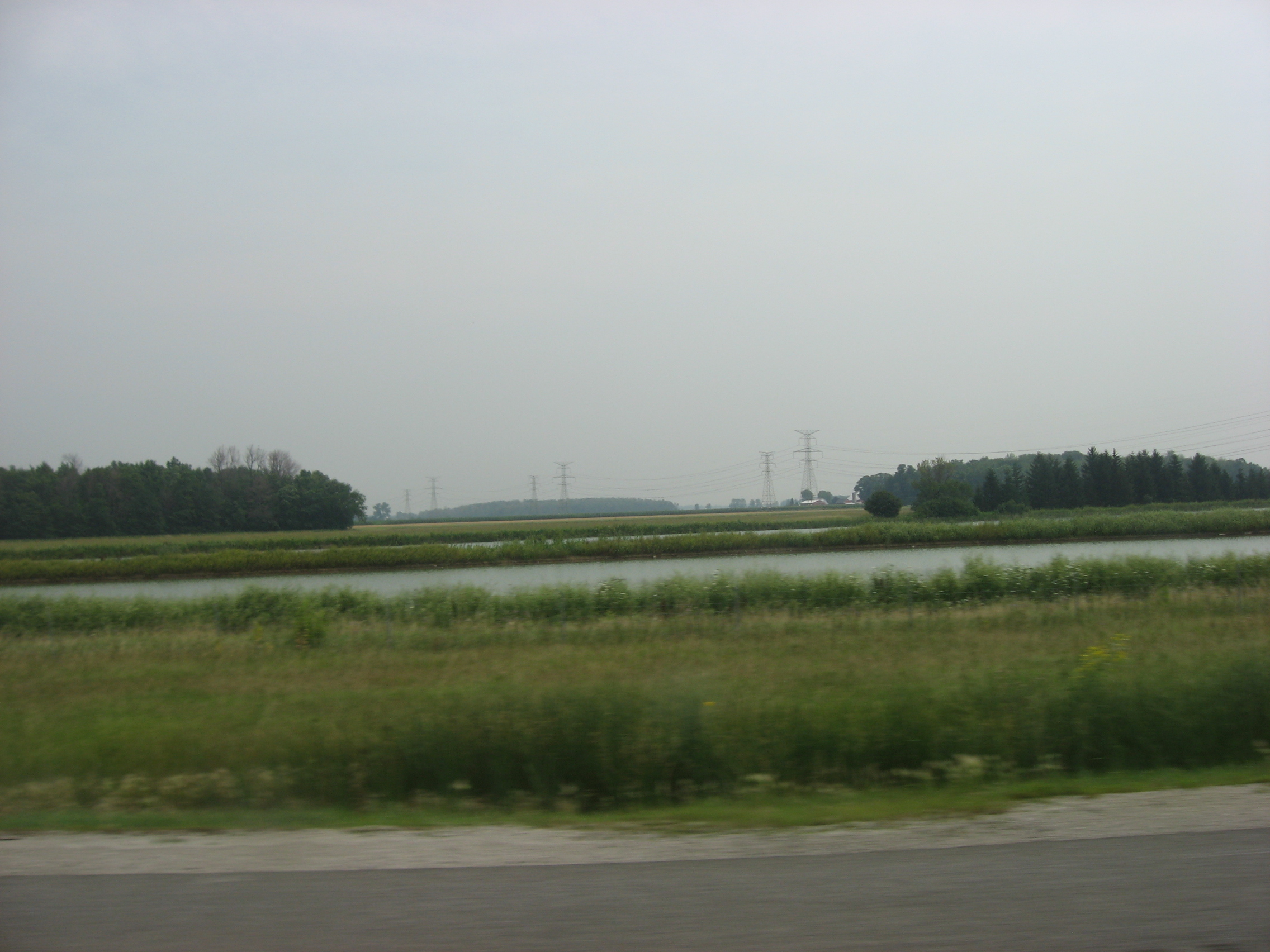
- Lake and fields in southeastern Lake Township

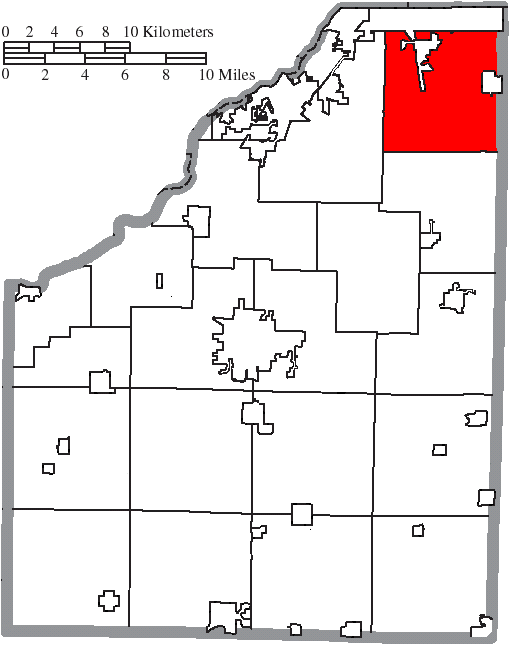
- Location of Lake Township in Wood County
- Coordinates: 41°34′11″N 83°28′9″W
- Country: United States
- State: Ohio
- County: Wood

Area
  - Total: 34.8 sq mi (90.1 km^{2})
  - Land: 34.7 sq mi (89.8 km^{2})
  - Water: 0.15 sq mi (0.4 km^{2})
- Elevation: 614 ft (187 m)

Population (2020)
  - Total: 11,160
  - Density: 322/sq mi (124.3/km^{2})
- Time zone: UTC-5 (Eastern (EST))
  - Summer (DST): UTC-4 (EDT)
- FIPS code: 39-41328
- GNIS feature ID: 1087186
- Website: www.laketwpohio.com

Lake Township is one of the nineteen townships of Wood County, Ohio, United States. The 2020 census found 11,160 people in the township.

== Geography ==
Located in the northeastern part of the county, it borders the following municipalities:

- Northwood - north
- Allen Township, Ottawa County - northeast
- Clay Township, Ottawa County - southeast
- Troy Township - south
- Perrysburg Township - west

Two villages are located in Lake Township: Millbury in the east, and Walbridge in the northwest. Two prominent unincorporated communities are within the township: East Lawn in the northeast, and Moline in the west.

Lake Township is the home of Toledo Executive Airport, formerly named Metcalf Field. The Lake Local School District athletic teams are nicknamed the "Flyers" in reference to the district's main campus location directly across the road from the airport.

== Name and history ==
Lake Township was established in 1844. Statewide, other Lake Townships are located in Ashland, Logan, and Stark counties.

=== 2010 tornado ===
At approximately 11:15 PM on June 5, 2010, an EF4 tornado tore through the township, destroying at least 50 homes and killing seven people. This tornado also destroyed the township's Administration Building and Police Department, and Lake High School. Governor Ted Strickland declared a state of emergency.

== Government ==
The township is governed by a three-member board of trustees, who are elected in November of odd-numbered years to a four-year term beginning on the following January 1. Two are elected in the year after the presidential election and one is elected in the year before it. There is also an elected township fiscal officer, who serves a four-year term beginning on April 1 of the year after the election, which is held in November of the year before the presidential election. Vacancies in the fiscal officership or on the board of trustees are filled by the remaining trustees.
