= Eastwood Local School District =

School district in Ohio

Address
- 120 E College Ave Pemberville, Ohio, 43450; United States
- Coordinates: 41°27′3″N 83°29′6″W

District information
- Type: Public School District
- Motto: "We're rolling; E+R=O; The Eagle Way"
- Grades: Pre-K–12
- NCES District ID: 3905067

Students and staff
- Students: 1,482 (2024–25)
- Teachers: 83.98 (on an FTE basis)
- Student–teacher ratio: 17.65

Other information
- Website: www.eastwoodschools.org

Eastwood Local School District is a school district in Northwest Ohio. The school district serves students who live primarily in and around the villages of Luckey and Pemberville, in Wood County. The superintendent is Brian Hughes.

== Grades 9–12 ==
- Eastwood High School

== Grades 6–8 ==
- Eastwood Middle School

== Grades PK–5 ==
- Eastwood Elementary School
