= Oak Harbor, Ohio =

- Village
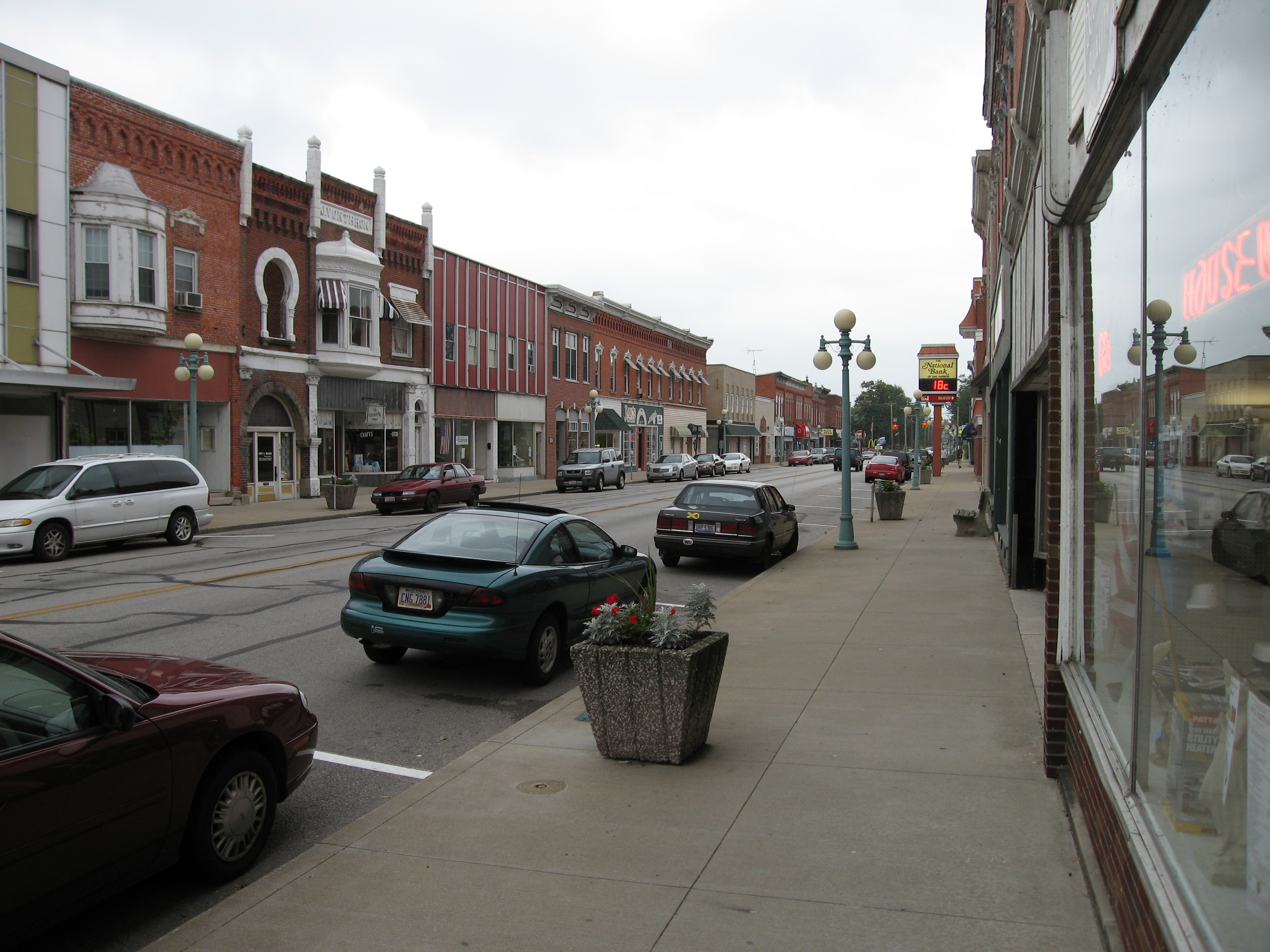
- Water Street runs concurrently with State Routes 105 and 163 in downtown Oak Harbor

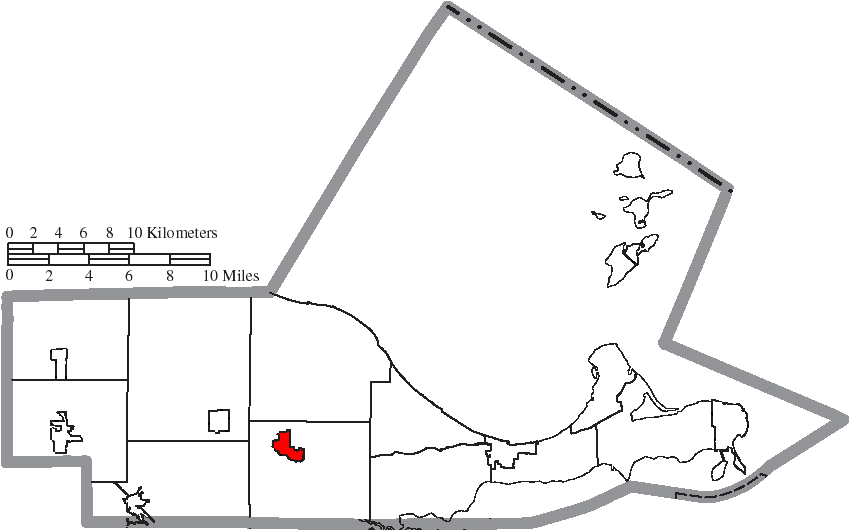
- Location of Oak Harbor in Ottawa County

- Location within Ohio Location within the United States
- Coordinates: 41°30′36″N 83°08′18″W
- Country: United States
- State: Ohio
- County: Ottawa

Government
  - Type: Mayor/Administrator-Council Government
  - Mayor: Quinton Babcock
  - Village Administrator: Jerry Burrow
  - Village Fiscal Officer: Danna McClanahan
  - Police Chief: Eric Parker

Area
  - Total: 1.71 sq mi (4.42 km^{2})
  - Land: 1.56 sq mi (4.03 km^{2})
  - Water: 0.15 sq mi (0.40 km^{2})
- Elevation: 591 ft (180 m)

Population (2020)
  - Total: 2,821
  - Density: 1,814.8/sq mi (700.69/km^{2})
- Time zone: UTC-5 (Eastern (EST))
  - Summer (DST): UTC-4 (EDT)
- ZIP code: 43449
- Area code: 419
- FIPS code: 39-57582
- GNIS feature ID: 2399536
- Website: http://www.oakharbor.oh.us/

Oak Harbor is a village in Ottawa County, Ohio, United States. The population was 2,821 at the 2020 census. Oak Harbor is 30 miles (48 km) east of Toledo. It lies a short distance southwest of the Davis–Besse Nuclear Power Station, one of two nuclear power plants in Ohio.

== Geography ==
According to the United States Census Bureau, the village has a total area of 1.70 square miles (4.40 km^{2}), of which 1.55 square miles (4.01 km^{2}) is land and 0.15 square miles (0.39 km^{2}) is water.

The Portage River flows through Oak Harbor on its way to Lake Erie at Port Clinton.

== Demographics ==
Historical population
Census	Pop.	Note	%±
1880	987		—
1890	1,681		70.3%
1900	1,631		−3.0%
1910	1,559		−4.4%
1920	1,858		19.2%
1930	1,849		−0.5%
1940	1,925		4.1%
1950	2,370		23.1%
1960	2,903		22.5%
1970	2,807		−3.3%
1980	2,678		−4.6%
1990	2,637		−1.5%
2000	2,841		7.7%
2010	2,759		−2.9%
2020	2,821		2.2%
U.S. Decennial Census

=== 2010 census ===
As of the census of 2010, there were 2,759 people, 1,153 households, and 738 families residing in the village. The population density was 1,780.0 inhabitants per square mile (687.3/km2). There were 1,262 housing units at an average density of 814.2 per square mile (314.4/km2). The racial makeup of the village was 97.5% White, 0.3% African American, 0.1% Native American, 0.1% Asian, 0.5% from other races, and 1.4% from two or more races. Hispanic or Latino of any race were 2.9% of the population.

There were 1,153 households, of which 33.8% had children under the age of 18 living with them, 45.9% were married couples living together, 13.7% had a female householder with no husband present, 4.4% had a male householder with no wife present, and 36.0% were non-families. In addition, 32.0% of all households and 18% had someone living alone who was 65 years of age or older. The average household size was 2.39, and the average family size was 3.03.

The median age in the village was 39.2 years. 26.4% of residents were under 18; 8% were between 18 and 24; 23.5% were from 25 to 44; 25.5% were from 45 to 64, and 16.7% were 65 years of age or older. The gender makeup of the village was 46.5% male and 53.5% female.

== Education ==
The Benton Carroll Salem Local School District owns and operates R.C. Waters Elementary School, Oak Harbor Intermediate School, and Oak Harbor High School.

The village has a public library, the Oak Harbor Public Library Central Library.

== Arts and culture ==
Oak Harbor is home to the annual Apple Festival which is held in early October. Many apples themed events are scheduled, including the "Apple Run", a five-kilometer race on the Sunday of the festival.

== Notable people ==
- Crystal Bowersox, singer-songwriter, runner up on American Idol
- Charles H. Graves (born 1872), Ohio Secretary of State between 1911 & 1915
- Kenn Kaufman (born 1954), naturalist, author, magazine columnist and conservationist lives nearby
- Joel Matthias Konzen (born 1950), Roman Catholic bishop, was born in Oak Harbor.
- Jacob Wukie, 2012 US Olympic archery team silver medalist
- Levi Youster (born 1992), racing driver
