= Walbridge, Ohio =

- Village
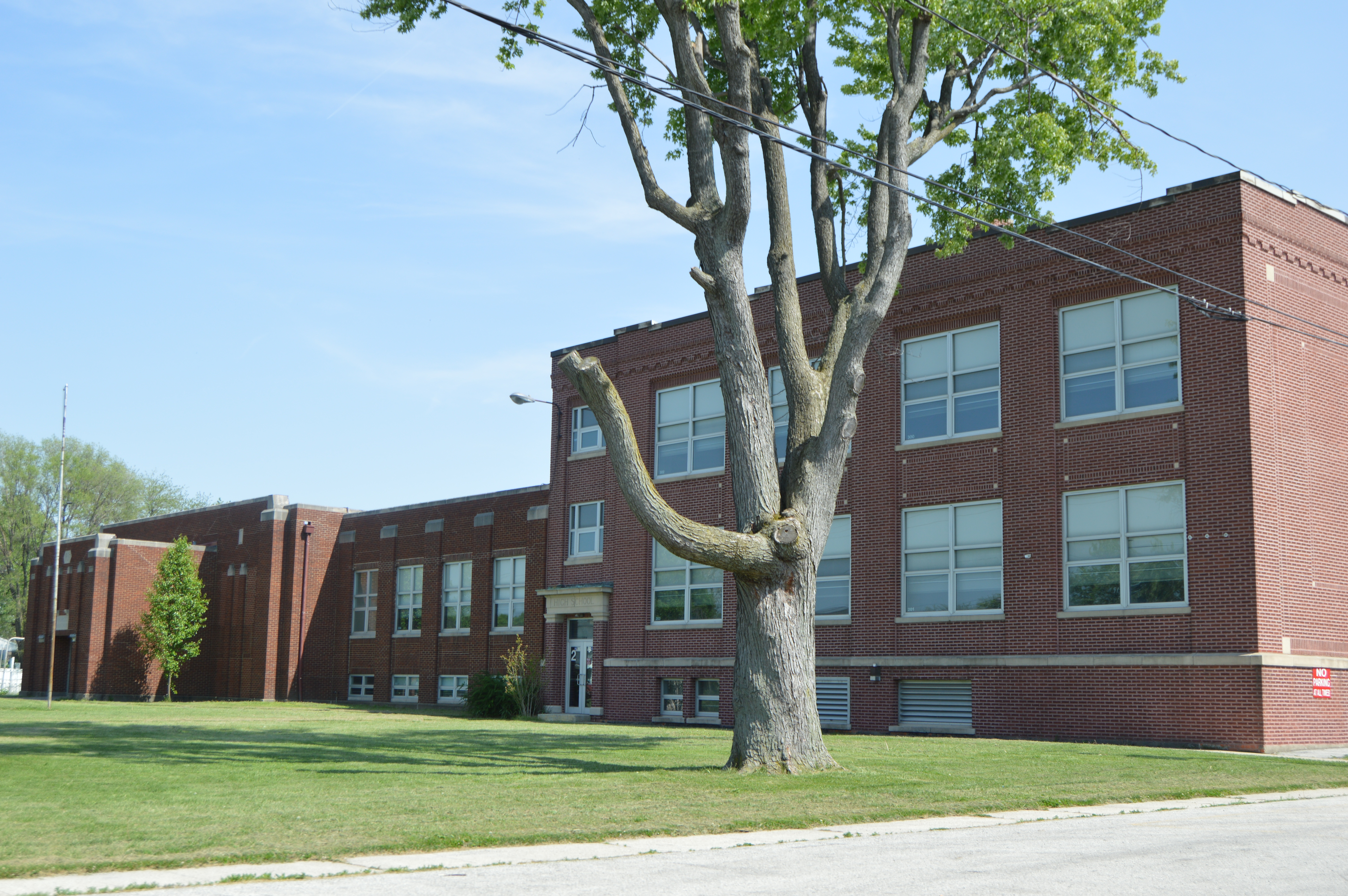
- Former high school
- Motto: "Town on the Right Track"
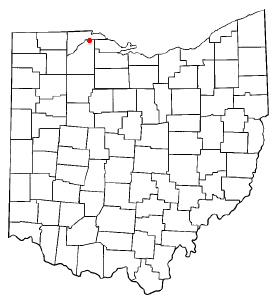
- Location of Walbridge, Ohio

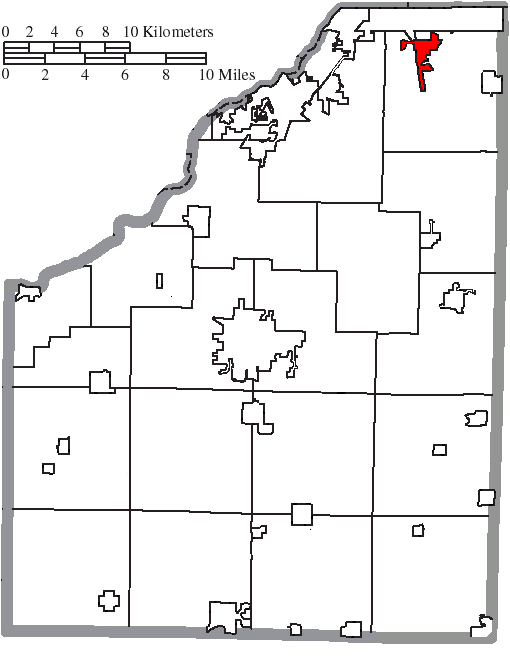
- Location of Walbridge in Wood County
- Coordinates: 41°35′18″N 83°30′12″W
- Country: United States
- State: Ohio
- County: Wood
- Township: Lake

Area
  - Total: 2.20 sq mi (5.70 km^{2})
  - Land: 2.19 sq mi (5.66 km^{2})
  - Water: 0.015 sq mi (0.04 km^{2})
- Elevation: 617 ft (188 m)

Population (2020)
  - Total: 3,011
  - Density: 1,377.1/sq mi (531.71/km^{2})
- Time zone: UTC-5 (Eastern (EST))
  - Summer (DST): UTC-4 (EDT)
- ZIP code: 43465
- Area code: 419
- FIPS code: 39-80486
- GNIS feature ID: 2400082
- Website: https://www.walbridgeohio.org/

Walbridge is a village in Wood County, Ohio, United States, within the Toledo metropolitan area. The population was 3,011 at the 2020 census.

== History ==
Walbridge was platted in 1874. A post office called Walbridge has been in operation since 1871. The village was incorporated in 1912.

== Geography ==
According to the United States Census Bureau, the village has a total area of 2.21 square miles (5.72 km^{2}), of which 2.19 square miles (5.67 km^{2}) is land and 0.02 square miles (0.05 km^{2}) is water.

== Demographics ==
Historical population
Census	Pop.	Note	%±
1920	584		—
1930	905		55.0%
1940	985		8.8%
1950	1,152		17.0%
1960	2,142		85.9%
1970	3,208		49.8%
1980	2,900		−9.6%
1990	2,736		−5.7%
2000	2,546		−6.9%
2010	3,019		18.6%
2020	3,011		−0.3%
U.S. Decennial Census

=== 2020 census ===
As of the 2020 census, Walbridge had a population of 3,011. The median age was 49.7 years. 16.0% of residents were under the age of 18 and 28.3% of residents were 65 years of age or older. For every 100 females there were 90.6 males, and for every 100 females age 18 and over there were 88.9 males age 18 and over.

100.0% of residents lived in urban areas, while 0.0% lived in rural areas.

There were 1,528 households in Walbridge, of which 17.9% had children under the age of 18 living in them. Of all households, 35.1% were married-couple households, 23.0% were households with a male householder and no spouse or partner present, and 35.1% were households with a female householder and no spouse or partner present. About 41.1% of all households were made up of individuals and 21.4% had someone living alone who was 65 years of age or older.

There were 1,654 housing units, of which 7.6% were vacant. The homeowner vacancy rate was 0.5% and the rental vacancy rate was 12.1%.

Racial composition as of the 2020 census
Race	Number	Percent
White	2,764	91.8%
Black or African American	20	0.7%
American Indian and Alaska Native	10	0.3%
Asian	5	0.2%
Native Hawaiian and Other Pacific Islander	0	0.0%
Some other race	43	1.4%
Two or more races	169	5.6%
Hispanic or Latino (of any race)	187	6.2%

=== 2010 census ===
At the 2010 census there were 3,019 people, 1,458 households, and 825 families living in the village. The population density was 1,378.5 inhabitants per square mile (532.2/km^{2}). There were 1,635 housing units at an average density of 746.6 per square mile (288.3/km^{2}). The racial makeup of the village was 95.9% White, 0.7% African American, 0.3% Native American, 0.3% Asian, 1.1% from other races, and 1.8% from two or more races. Hispanic or Latino of any race were 5.6%.

Of the 1,458 households 21.5% had children under the age of 18 living with them, 40.3% were married couples living together, 11.7% had a female householder with no husband present, 4.6% had a male householder with no wife present, and 43.4% were non-families. 37.5% of households were one person and 16.7% were one person aged 65 or older. The average household size was 2.07 and the average family size was 2.68.

The median age in the village was 47.4 years. 17.7% of residents were under the age of 18; 8.2% were between the ages of 18 and 24; 20.8% were from 25 to 44; 29.5% were from 45 to 64; and 23.8% were 65 or older. The gender makeup of the village was 46.1% male and 53.9% female.

=== 2000 census ===
At the 2000 census there were 2,546 people, 1,078 households, and 743 families living in the village. The population density was 1,532.0 inhabitants per square mile (591.5/km^{2}). There were 1,110 housing units at an average density of 667.9 per square mile (257.9/km^{2}). The racial makeup of the village was 97.29% White, 0.51% African American, 0.31% Native American, 0.24% Asian, 0.71% from other races, and 0.94% from two or more races. Hispanic or Latino of any race were 2.67%.

Of the 1,078 households 28.4% had children under the age of 18 living with them, 53.0% were married couples living together, 12.3% had a female householder with no husband present, and 31.0% were non-families. 27.5% of households were one person and 10.4% were one person aged 65 or older. The average household size was 2.35 and the average family size was 2.85.

The age distribution was 23.4% under the age of 18, 9.0% from 18 to 24, 26.7% from 25 to 44, 24.7% from 45 to 64, and 16.3% 65 or older. The median age was 40 years. For every 100 females there were 90.0 males. For every 100 females age 18 and over, there were 88.7 males.

The median household income was $40,234 and the median family income was $54,063. Males had a median income of $44,185 versus $26,042 for females. The per capita income for the village was $19,783. About 3.7% of families and 4.7% of the population were below the poverty line, including 2.5% of those under age 18 and 4.6% of those age 65 or over.

== Education ==
It is in the Lake Local School District.

The former Walbridge Elementary School was sold by the school district in 2012.

Walbridge has a public library, a branch of the Wood County District Public Library.

== Notable people ==
- Ed Scott - A right-handed pitcher who appeared for two years in the major leagues.
- Michael Lee Lockheart - A multistate serial killer executed in 1997 in Texas.
