= Lake High School (Millbury, Ohio) =

Public high school in Ohio, United States

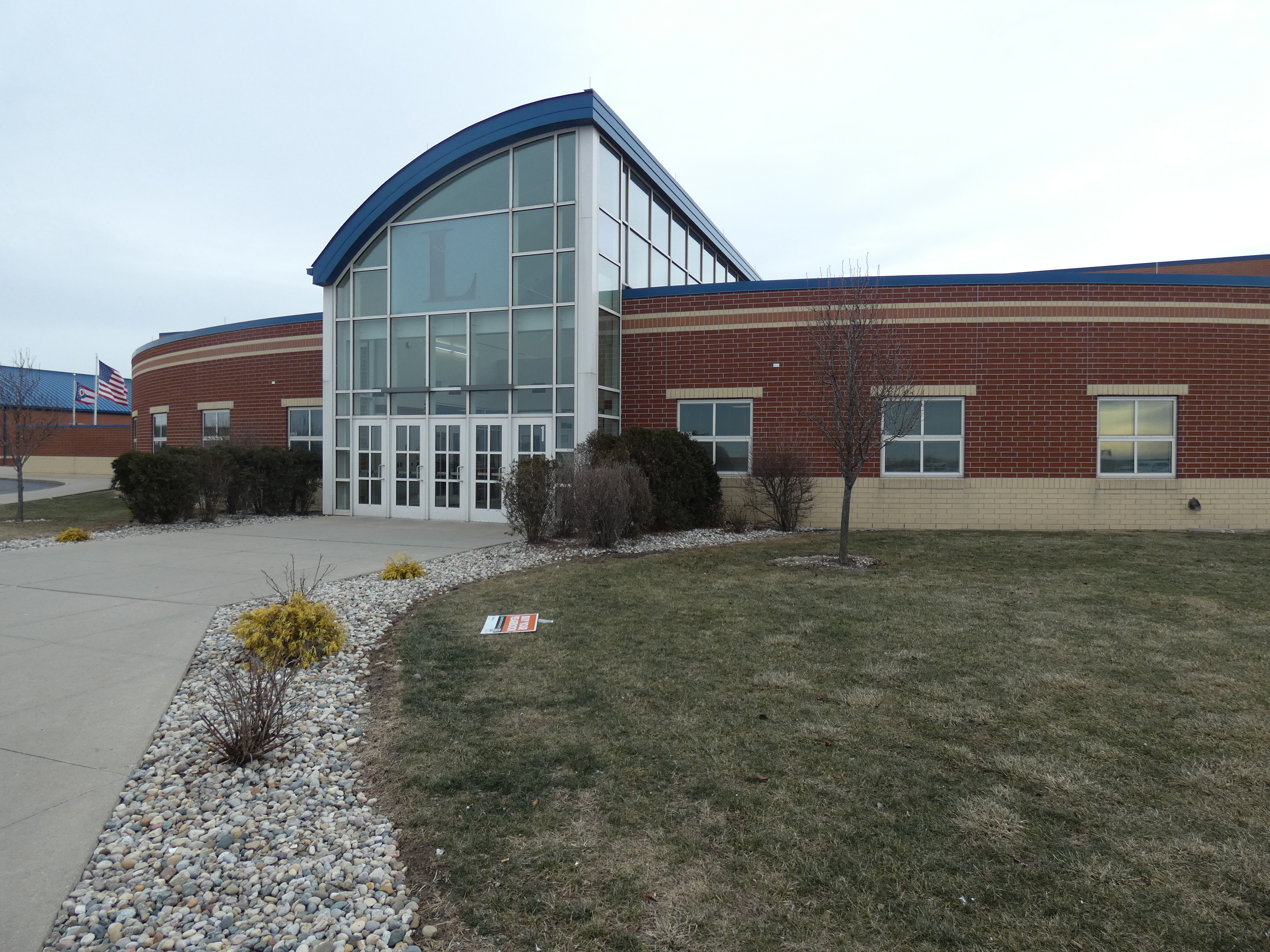

Location
- 28080 Lemoyne Rd; Millbury, Ohio 43447; United States
- Coordinates: 41°33′35.14″N 83°28′15.67″W

Information
- School district: Lake Local School District
- NCES School ID: 390506904032
- Principal: Lee Herman
- Faculty: 26.00 (on an FTE basis)
- Grades: 9-12
- Enrollment: 444 (2024–2025)
- Student to teacher ratio: 17.08
- Campus type: Rural
- Colors: Navy blue, White, Columbia blue
- Athletics conference: Northern Buckeye Conference
- Team name: Flyers
- Website: https://www.lakeschools.org

Lake High School is a public high school in Millbury, Ohio. It is the only high school in the Lake Local School District. Athletic teams are known as the Flyers, and they compete as a member of the Ohio High School Athletic Association in the Northern Buckeye Conference.

== History ==
Lake High School formed in 1923, with the township centralizing the Lake Township School District in March 1921. High school students attended what is the current Lake Middle School. The current high school building was built in 1953, expanding the high school after adding Millbury Village Schools in May 1934 and Walbridge Schools in May 1953. Late additions were added between the 1950s into the 1970s, including a cafeteria and music room.

On Saturday, June 5, 2010, a large portion of Lake High School was destroyed by an EF4 tornado, which killed seven in the area around Millbury. The tornado threw a bus onto the tennis courts and tore off the back end of the school and also hit the Lake Township police station. Graduation was to be held on Sunday, June 6 at the school. The building was described as "completely destroyed" and "unsalvageable". One of those killed was the father of the 2010 valedictorian. The students were educated for two years at Owens Community College while the new building was constructed. Construction of the new building was completed on July 13, 2012.

== Athletics ==
Lake High School currently offers:

- Baseball
- Basketball
- Cheerleading
- Cross country
- Golf
- Football
- Soccer
- Softball
- Track and field
- Volleyball
- Wrestling

== Notable alumni ==
- Dominick Evans – filmmaker and activist, class of 1999
