= Millbury, Ohio =

- Village
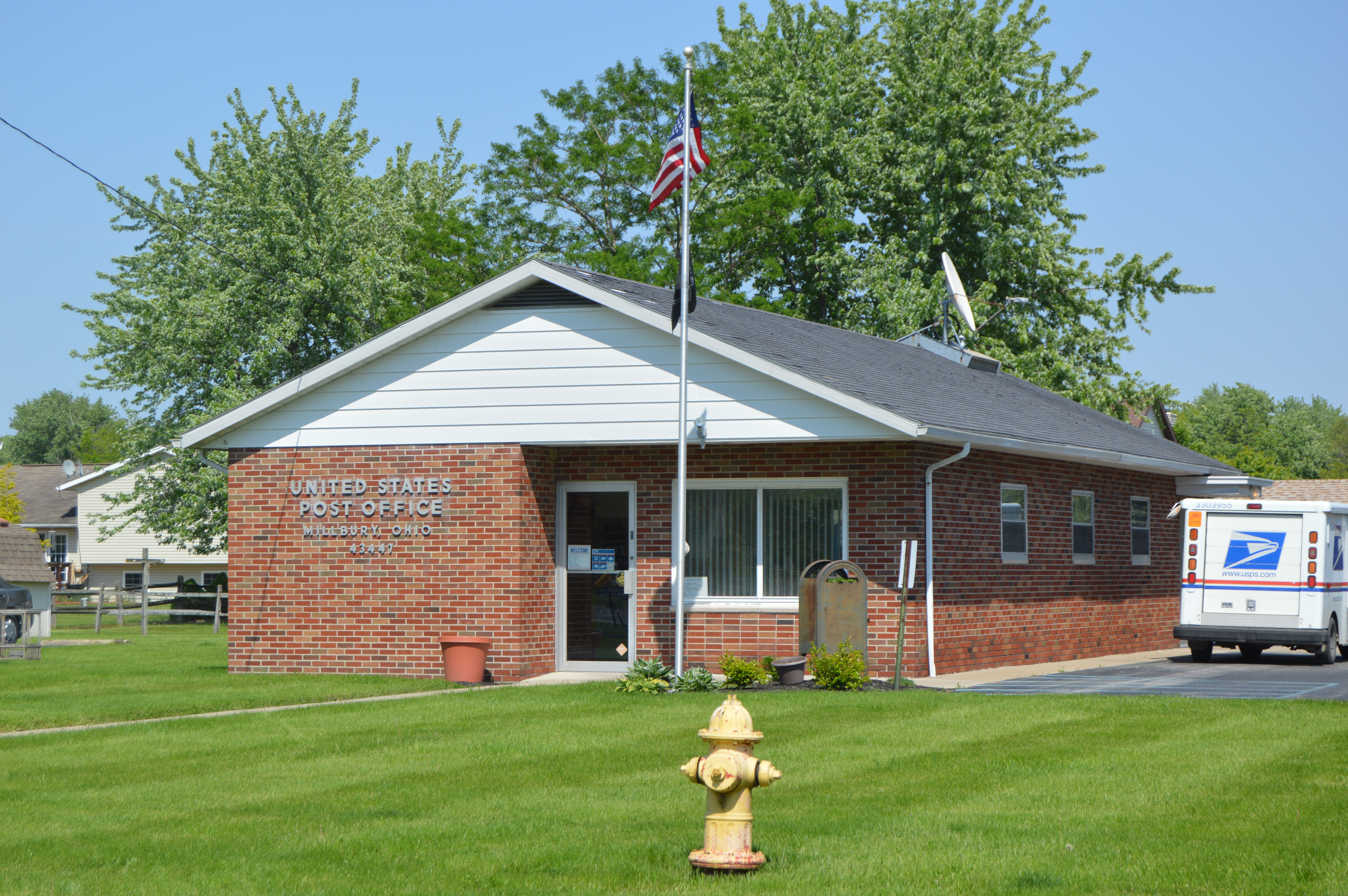
- Post office

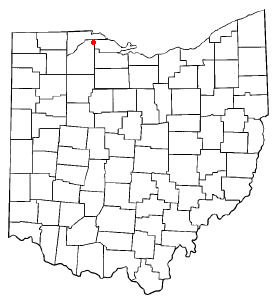
- Location of Millbury, Ohio

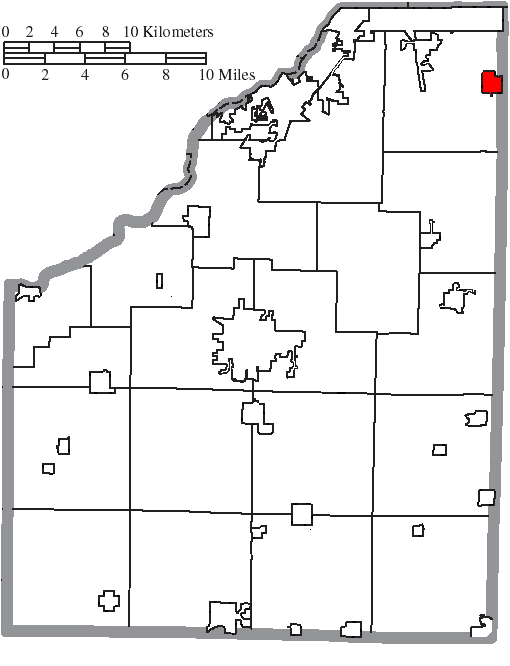
- Location of Millbury in Wood County
- Coordinates: 41°33′53″N 83°25′32″W
- Country: United States
- State: Ohio
- County: Wood
- Township: Lake

Area
  - Total: 1.00 sq mi (2.58 km^{2})
  - Land: 1.00 sq mi (2.58 km^{2})
  - Water: 0 sq mi (0.00 km^{2})
- Elevation: 614 ft (187 m)

Population (2020)
  - Total: 1,193
  - Density: 1,197.6/sq mi (462.41/km^{2})
- Time zone: UTC-5 (Eastern (EST))
  - Summer (DST): UTC-4 (EDT)
- ZIP code: 43447
- Area code: 419
- FIPS code: 39-50260
- GNIS feature ID: 2399352
- Website: https://www.villageofmillbury.us/

Millbury is a village in Wood County, Ohio, United States. The population was 1,193 at the 2020 census.

== History ==
Previously, the site of Millbury was known as Clay Junction. Millbury was platted in 1864, and named after Millbury, Massachusetts. A post office called Millbury has been in operation since 1857. Millbury was incorporated in 1874.

=== 2010 tornado ===
At approximately 11:15 PM on June 5, 2010, an EF4 tornado tore through the town, destroying at least 50 homes and killing seven people. This tornado also destroyed the Lake Township Administration Building and Police Department, and Lake High School. Governor Ted Strickland declared a state of emergency.

== Geography ==
According to the United States Census Bureau, the village has a total area of 1.00 square mile (2.59 km^{2}), all land.

== Demographics ==
Historical population
Census	Pop.	Note	%±
1880	483		—
1890	546		13.0%
1900	284		−48.0%
1910	276		−2.8%
1920	232		−15.9%
1930	403		73.7%
1940	428		6.2%
1950	482		12.6%
1960	730		51.5%
1970	771		5.6%
1980	955		23.9%
1990	1,081		13.2%
2000	1,161		7.4%
2010	1,200		3.4%
2020	1,193		−0.6%
U.S. Decennial Census

=== 2010 census ===
As of the census of 2010, there were 1,200 people, 468 households, and 352 families living in the village. The population density was 1,200.0 inhabitants per square mile (463.3/km^{2}). There were 492 housing units at an average density of 492.0 per square mile (190.0/km^{2}). The racial makeup of the village was 96.7% White, 0.7% African American, 0.7% Asian, 1.1% from other races, and 0.9% from two or more races. Hispanic or Latino of any race were 4.8% of the population.

There were 468 households, of which 33.1% had children under the age of 18 living with them, 59.8% were married couples living together, 10.7% had a female householder with no husband present, 4.7% had a male householder with no wife present, and 24.8% were non-families. 21.2% of all households were made up of individuals, and 8.3% had someone living alone who was 65 years of age or older. The average household size was 2.56 and the average family size was 2.97.

The median age in the village was 40.7 years. 25.1% of residents were under the age of 18; 6.8% were between the ages of 18 and 24; 24.9% were from 25 to 44; 31% were from 45 to 64; and 12.3% were 65 years of age or older. The gender makeup of the village was 48.3% male and 51.8% female.

=== 2000 census ===
As of the census of 2000, there were 1,161 people, 421 households, and 340 families living in the village. The population density was 1,181.1 inhabitants per square mile (456.0/km^{2}). There were 435 housing units at an average density of 442.5 per square mile (170.9/km^{2}). The racial makeup of the village was 99.14% White, 0.17% Native American, 0.17% Asian, 0.09% Pacific Islander, 0.09% from other races, and 0.34% from two or more races. Hispanic or Latino of any race were 0.60% of the population.

There were 421 households, out of which 37.8% had children under the age of 18 living with them, 69.4% were married couples living together, 7.8% had a female householder with no husband present, and 19.2% were non-families. 17.1% of all households were made up of individuals, and 7.4% had someone living alone who was 65 years of age or older. The average household size was 2.76 and the average family size was 3.10.

In the village, the population was spread out, with 26.9% under the age of 18, 7.0% from 18 to 24, 30.7% from 25 to 44, 25.3% from 45 to 64, and 10.2% who were 65 years of age or older. The median age was 37 years. For every 100 females there were 94.5 males. For every 100 females age 18 and over, there were 92.1 males.

The median income for a household in the village was $54,306, and the median income for a family was $62,386. Males had a median income of $42,000 versus $26,513 for females. The per capita income for the village was $22,157. About 1.5% of families and 2.6% of the population were below the poverty line, including 2.0% of those under age 18 and 4.9% of those age 65 or over.

== See also ==
- 2010 Millbury tornado
