= Ohio State Route 281 =

State highway in northwestern Ohio, US

State Route 281

Route information
- Maintained by ODOT
- Length: 50.71 mi (81.61 km)
- Existed: 1930–present

Major junctions
- West end: US 24 near Defiance
- East end: US 6 near Bradner

Location
- Country: United States
- State: Ohio
- Counties: Defiance, Henry, Wood

Highway system
- Ohio State Highway System; Interstate; US; State; Scenic
← SR 280	→ SR 282

State Route 281 (SR 281) is an east–west state highway in the northwestern portion of the U.S. state of Ohio. Its western terminus is at U.S. Route 24 approximately four miles (6.4 km) northeast of downtown Defiance, and its eastern terminus is at US 6 nearly one mile (1.6 km) north of Bradner. The majority of the route is known as the Defiance Pike.

== Route description ==
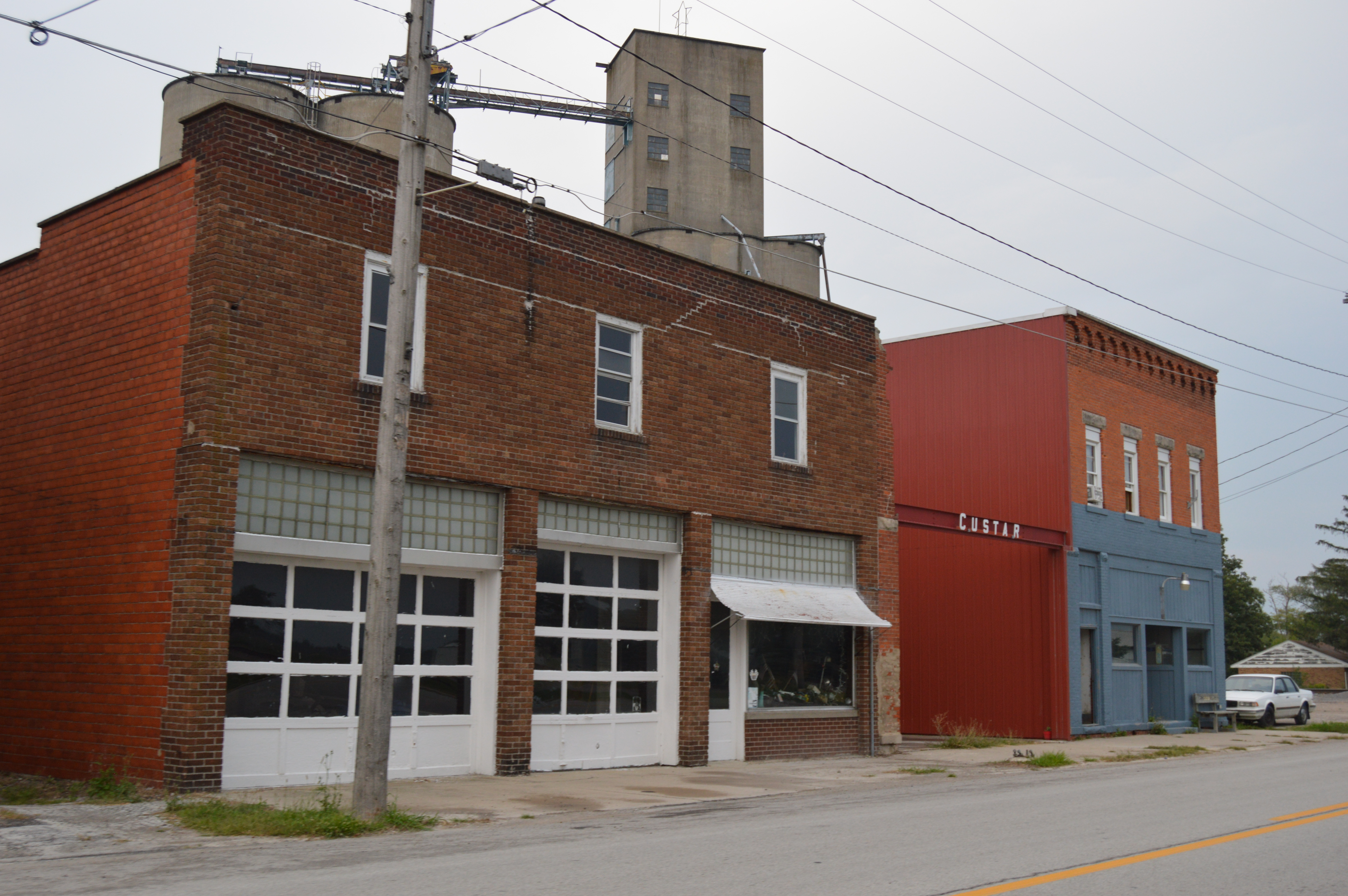
Central Custar

The state route begins at a diamond interchange with the US 24 freeway (exit 28). The interchange is partially within the city limits of Defiance and partially in Richland Township. Defiance County Route 175 heads north from the interchange while SR 281 heads south along Domersville Road often crossing between Defiance and Richland Township. After a traffic signal at a connector road to Defiance County Route 424, the route crosses the Maumee River on a plate girder bridge. A short distance later, SR 281 intersects SR 18 and the two routes form a concurrency and head east out of the city past a General Motors factory. After 1.6 miles (2.6 km), the SR 18 concurrency ends and SR 281 continues due east. Outside of the Defiance area, the route's surroundings becomes much more agricultural. After exiting Defiance County, it enters Henry County. SR 281 does not pass through any incorporated villages through Henry County, but it intersects State Routes 108, 109, and 65. After crossing into Wood County, SR 281 enters the small village of Custar. SR 281 continues east intersecting SR 235 and SR 25 but also passes over Interstate 75 without an interchange. After its intersection with SR 199, SR 281 turns to the northeast and enters the village of Wayne. Through Wayne, the route has the road names of Main Street and Church Street. One and a half miles (2.4 km) northeast of Wayne, SR 281 then passes through the village of Bradner first on Church Street, then due north on Main Street. SR 281 ends at as stop-controlled intersection with US 6 about one mile (1.6 km) north of Bradner. The road continues north as the Freedom Township-maintained Bradner Road.

== History ==
SR 281 was first designated on its current alignment in 1930, but only on the five-mile-long (8.0 km) segment between SR 109 and SR 65 in Henry County. In 1934, the route was extended east into Wood County to end at then-US 25 and US 68 in Wood County (modern-day SR 25) and within one year, was extended west to SR 18 near Defiance. The route was extended further east to its current eastern terminus in 1939 when SR 281 was routed over county roads and SR 297 from Wayne through Bradner to US 6. The route would remain unchanged for 33 years except for becoming fully asphalt-paved by 1950.

In 1972, SR 281 was extended west on a new bridge over the Maumee River and over existing roads to end at the US 24 bypass of Defiance and Napoleon. The road between CR 424 (formerly SR 424) and US 24 had been designated as a part of US 24 during the time the Defiance bypass was complete but the Napoleon portion was still under construction. The at-grade intersection with US 24 was replaced by a diamond interchange in 2007 as a part of the widening of US 24 through northwestern Ohio.

== Major intersections ==
County	Location	mi	km	Destinations	Notes
Defiance	Defiance	0.00– 0.33	0.00– 0.53	US 24 / CR 175 (Domersville Road)	Exit 28 (US 24); diamond interchange
Defiance	Defiance	2.25	3.62	SR 18 west (East Second Street) / Florence Avenue – Defiance	Western end of SR 18 concurrency
Defiance	Richland Township	3.89	6.26	SR 18 east – Holgate	Eastern end of SR 18 concurrency
Henry	Flatrock Township	12.97	20.87	SR 108 – Napoleon, Holgate	
Henry	Monroe Township	17.17	27.63	SR 109 – Malinta, Hamler	
Henry	Richfield Township	22.18	35.70	SR 65 – McClure, Ottawa	
Wood	Milton Township	30.24	48.67	SR 235 (Otsego Pike) – Weston, Hoytville	
Wood	Liberty–Portage township line	37.30– 37.31	60.03– 60.04	SR 25 (South Dixie Highway) – Bowling Green, Findlay	
Wood	Montgomery Township	44.68	71.91	SR 199 (McCutcheonville Road) – Perrysburg, Fostoria	
Wood	Montgomery–Freedom township line	50.71	81.61	US 6 (Bowling Green Road) / Bradner Road	
1.000 mi = 1.609 km; 1.000 km = 0.621 mi: Concurrency terminus
