= Pleasant Township, Henry County, Ohio =

Township in Ohio, US

- Township
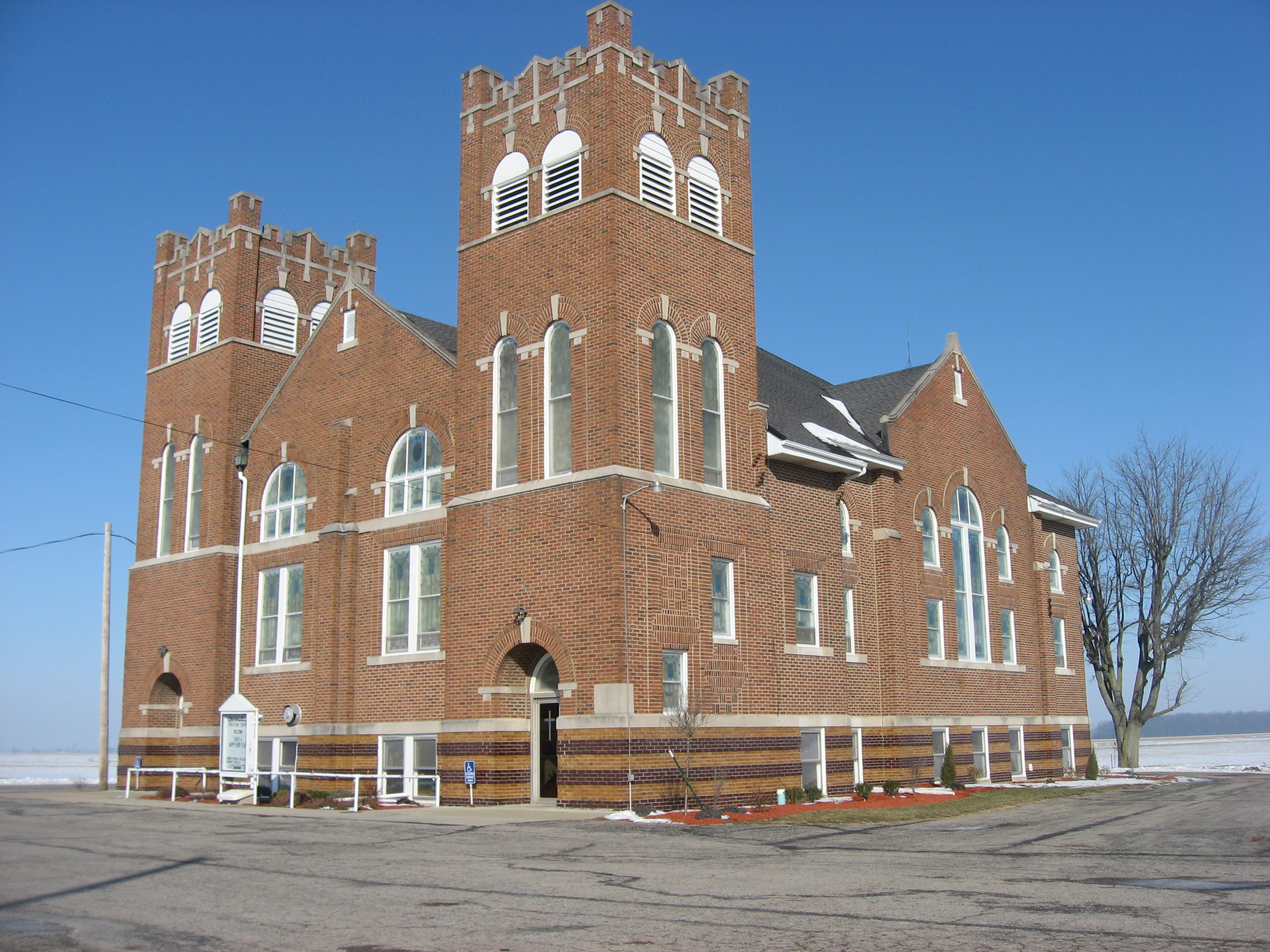
- Emanuel's Christian Church, a landmark in the township

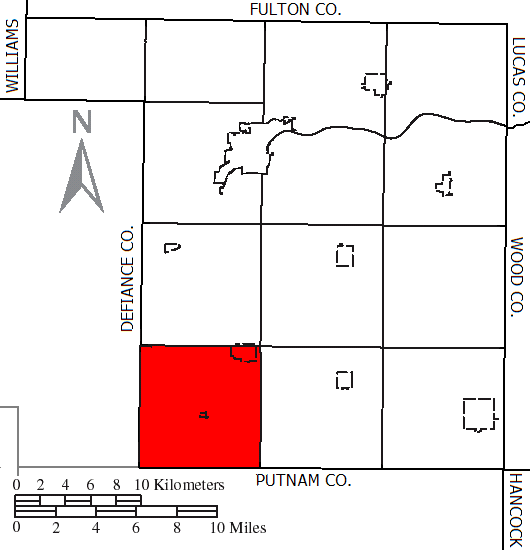
- Location of Pleasant Township in Henry County
- Coordinates: 41°13′24″N 84°9′36″W
- Country: United States
- State: Ohio
- County: Henry

Area
  - Total: 36.0 sq mi (93.3 km^{2})
  - Land: 36.0 sq mi (93.3 km^{2})
  - Water: 0 sq mi (0.0 km^{2})
- Elevation: 720 ft (220 m)

Population (2020)
  - Total: 1,882
  - Density: 52.2/sq mi (20.2/km^{2})
- Time zone: UTC-5 (Eastern (EST))
  - Summer (DST): UTC-4 (EDT)
- FIPS code: 39-63296
- GNIS feature ID: 1086295

Pleasant Township is one of the thirteen townships of Henry County, Ohio, United States. As of the 2020 census the population was 1,882.

== Geography ==
Located in the southwestern corner of the county, it borders the following townships:

- Flatrock Township - north
- Monroe Township - northeast corner
- Marion Township - east
- Liberty Township, Putnam County - southeast corner
- Palmer Township, Putnam County - south
- Monroe Township, Putnam County - southwest corner
- Highland Township, Defiance County - west
- Richland Township, Defiance County - northwest corner

Most of the village of Holgate is located in northeastern Pleasant Township, and the village of New Bavaria (the smallest village in Henry County) is located in the center of the township.

== Name and history ==
It is one of fifteen Pleasant Townships statewide.

== Government ==
The township is governed by a three-member board of trustees, who are elected in November of odd-numbered years to a four-year term beginning on the following January 1. Two are elected in the year after the presidential election and one is elected in the year before it. There is also an elected township fiscal officer, who serves a four-year term beginning on April 1 of the year after the election, which is held in November of the year before the presidential election. Vacancies in the fiscal officership or on the board of trustees are filled by the remaining trustees.

Public education for the township is administered by the Holgate Local School District.
