= Harrison Township, Henry County, Ohio =

Township in Ohio, US

- Township
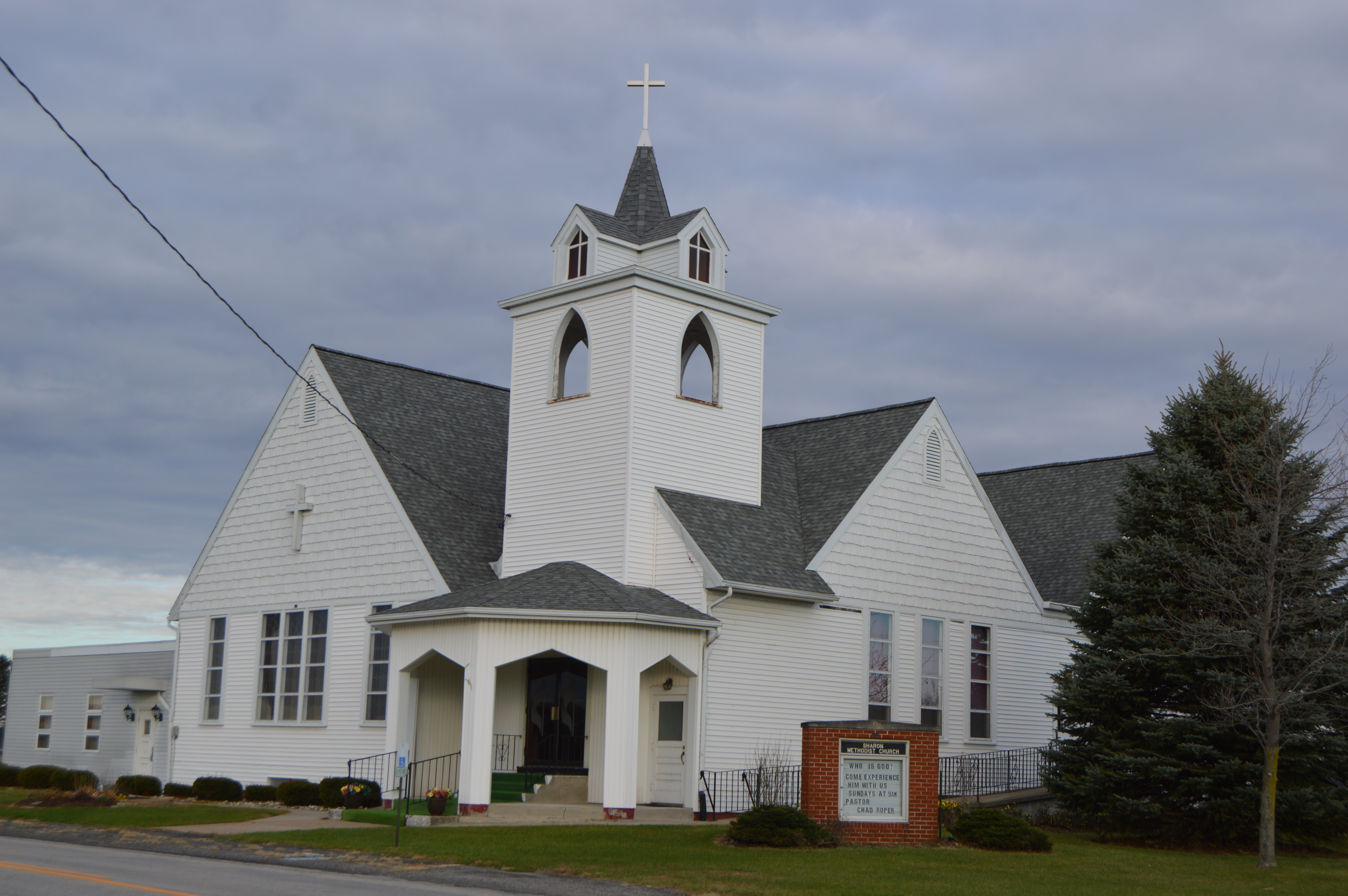
- Sharon United Methodist Church, north of Malinta

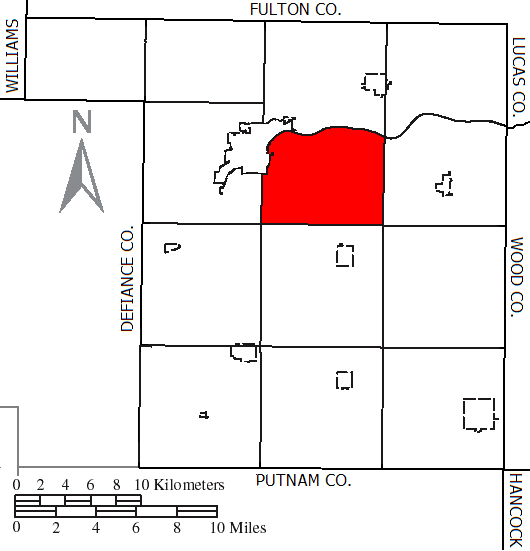
- Location of Harrison Township in Henry County
- Coordinates: 41°22′47″N 84°3′53″W
- Country: United States
- State: Ohio
- County: Henry

Area
  - Total: 27.5 sq mi (71.2 km^{2})
  - Land: 26.9 sq mi (69.8 km^{2})
  - Water: 0.54 sq mi (1.4 km^{2})
- Elevation: 682 ft (208 m)

Population (2020)
  - Total: 1,297
  - Density: 48.1/sq mi (18.6/km^{2})
- Time zone: UTC-5 (Eastern (EST))
  - Summer (DST): UTC-4 (EDT)
- FIPS code: 39-33866
- GNIS feature ID: 1086290

Harrison Township is one of the thirteen townships of Henry County, Ohio, United States. As of the 2020 census the population was 1,297.

== Geography ==
Located in the central part of the county, it borders the following townships:

- Liberty Township - north
- Washington Township - northeast corner
- Damascus Township - east
- Richfield Township - southeast corner
- Monroe Township - south
- Flatrock Township - southwest corner
- Napoleon Township - west
- Freedom Township - northwest corner

Harrison Township is one of only two townships in the county without a border on another county.

A small part of the county seat of Napoleon is located in northwestern Harrison Township.

== Name and history ==
It is one of nineteen Harrison Townships statewide.

== Government ==
The township is governed by a three-member board of trustees, who are elected in November of odd-numbered years to a four-year term beginning on the following January 1. Two are elected in the year after the presidential election and one is elected in the year before it. There is also an elected township fiscal officer, who serves a four-year term beginning on April 1 of the year after the election, which is held in November of the year before the presidential election. Vacancies in the fiscal officership or on the board of trustees are filled by the remaining trustees.
