= Freedom Township, Ohio =

Freedom Township, Ohio, may refer to:

- Freedom Township, Henry County, Ohio
- Freedom Township, Portage County, Ohio
- Freedom Township, Wood County, Ohio
