= Highland Township, Ohio =

Highland Township, Ohio, may refer to:

- Highland Township, Defiance County, Ohio
- Highland Township, Muskingum County, Ohio
