= Auglaize Township, Ohio =

Auglaize Township, Ohio, may refer to:

- Auglaize Township, Allen County, Ohio
- Auglaize Township, Paulding County, Ohio
