= Liberty Township, Henry County, Ohio =

Township in Ohio, US

- Township
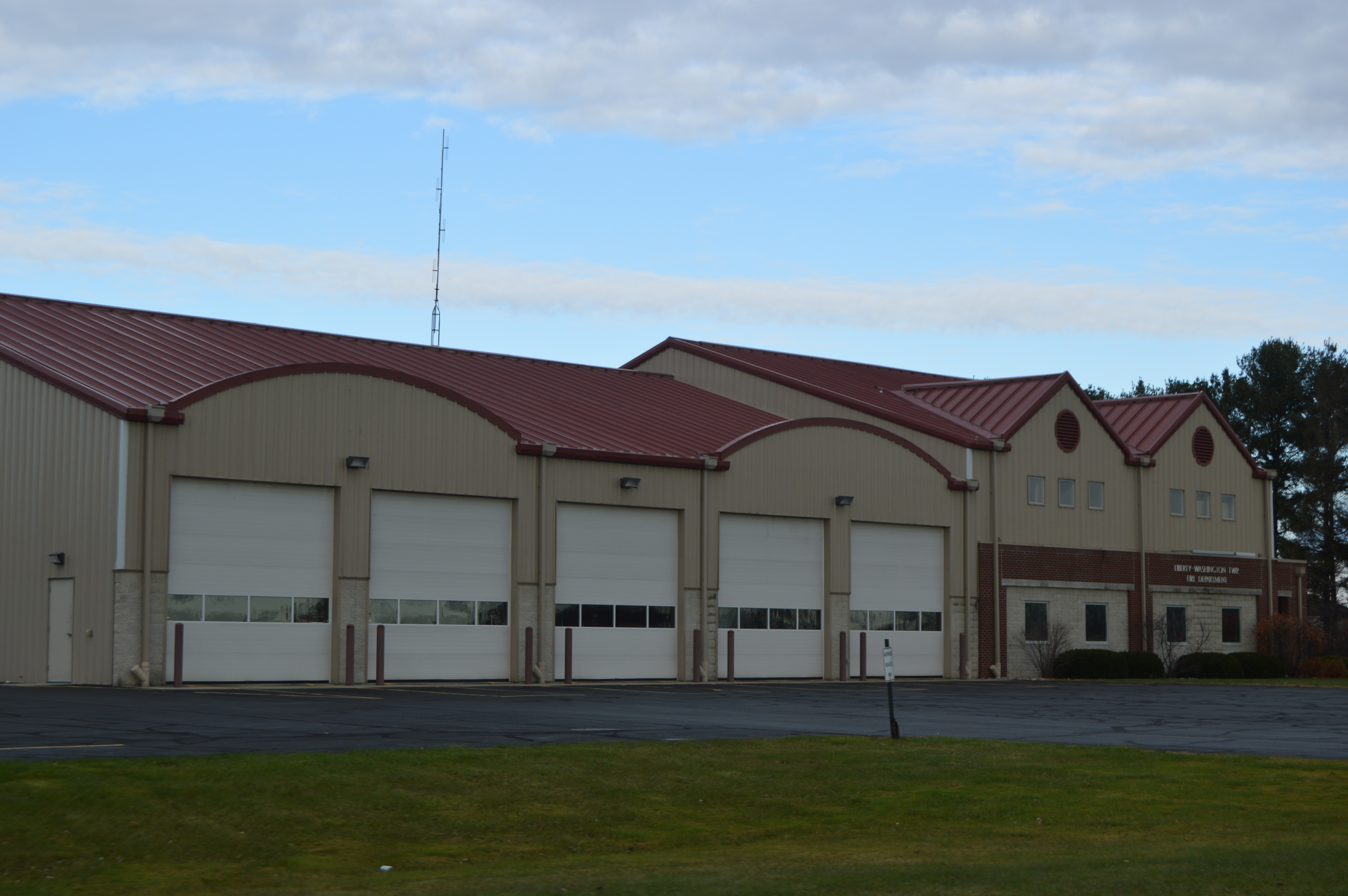
- Fire station northwest of Liberty Center

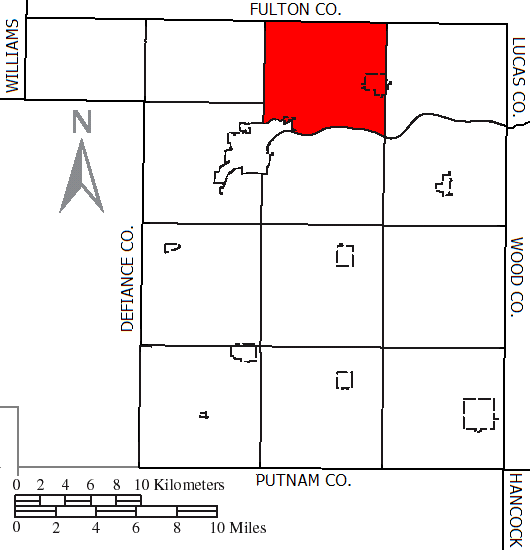
- Location of Liberty Township in Henry County
- Coordinates: 41°26′28″N 84°2′49″W
- Country: United States
- State: Ohio
- County: Henry

Area
  - Total: 32.6 sq mi (84.4 km^{2})
  - Land: 32.0 sq mi (82.8 km^{2})
  - Water: 0.62 sq mi (1.6 km^{2})
- Elevation: 673 ft (205 m)

Population (2020)
  - Total: 2,442
  - Density: 76.4/sq mi (29.5/km^{2})
- Time zone: UTC-5 (Eastern (EST))
  - Summer (DST): UTC-4 (EDT)
- FIPS code: 39-43176
- GNIS feature ID: 1086291

Liberty Township is one of the thirteen townships of Henry County, Ohio, United States. As of the 2020 census the population was 2,442.

== Geography ==
Located in the northern part of the county, it borders the following townships:

- York Township, Fulton County - north
- Swan Creek Township, Fulton County - northeast corner
- Washington Township - east
- Damascus Township - southeast corner
- Harrison Township - south
- Napoleon Township - southwest corner
- Freedom Township - west
- Clinton Township, Fulton County - northwest corner

The village of Liberty Center is located in the eastern portion of the township, and a portion of the city of Napoleon, the Henry county seat, is in the southwest part of the township.

== Name and history ==
It is one of twenty-five Liberty Townships statewide.

== Government ==
The township is governed by a three-member board of trustees, who are elected in November of odd-numbered years to a four-year term beginning on the following January 1. Two are elected in the year after the presidential election and one is elected in the year before it. There is also an elected township fiscal officer, who serves a four-year term beginning on April 1 of the year after the election, which is held in November of the year before the presidential election. Vacancies in the fiscal officership or on the board of trustees are filled by the remaining trustees.

Public education for the township is administered by the Liberty Center Local School District.
