= Napoleon Township, Henry County, Ohio =

Township in Ohio, US

- Township
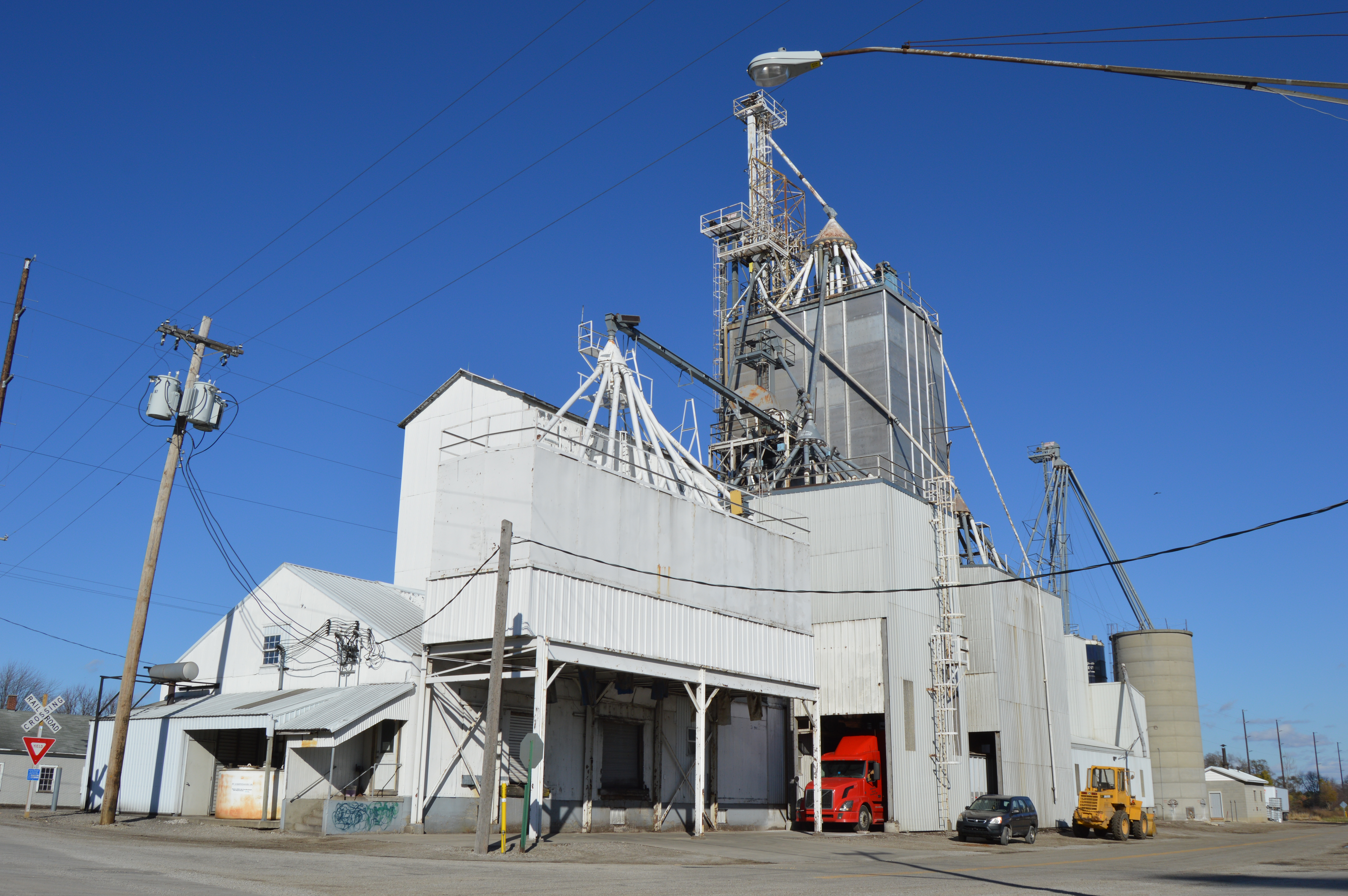
- Okolona grain elevator

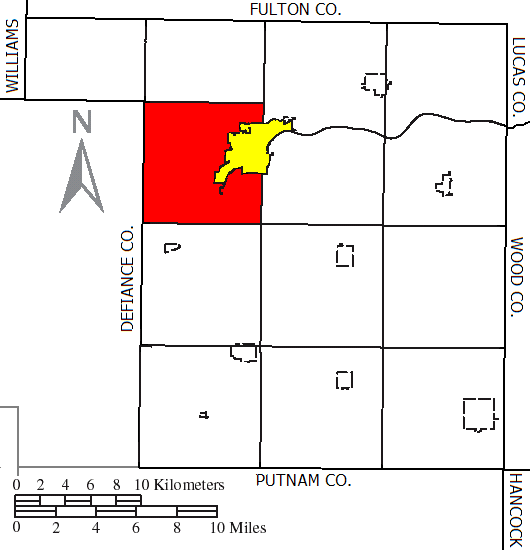
- Location of Napoleon Township (red) in Henry County, around the city of Napoleon (yellow)
- Coordinates: 41°23′18″N 84°8′43″W
- Country: United States
- State: Ohio
- County: Henry

Area
  - Total: 35.2 sq mi (91.1 km^{2})
  - Land: 34.7 sq mi (89.8 km^{2})
  - Water: 0.50 sq mi (1.3 km^{2})
- Elevation: 676 ft (206 m)

Population (2020)
  - Total: 9,750
  - Density: 281/sq mi (109/km^{2})
- Time zone: UTC-5 (Eastern (EST))
  - Summer (DST): UTC-4 (EDT)
- ZIP codes: 43545, 43550
- Area code: 419
- FIPS code: 39-53564
- GNIS feature ID: 1086294

Napoleon Township is one of the thirteen townships of Henry County, Ohio, United States. As of the 2020 census the population was 9,750.

== Geography ==
Located in the western part of the county, it borders the following townships:

- Freedom Township - north
- Liberty Township - northeast
- Harrison Township - east
- Monroe Township - southeast corner
- Flatrock Township - south
- Richland Township, Defiance County - southwest corner
- Adams Township, Defiance County - west
- Ridgeville Township - northwest corner

Most of the city of Napoleon, the county seat of Henry County, is located in the eastern half of Napoleon Township, and the unincorporated community of Okolona lies in the township's southwest.

== Name and history ==
It is the only Napoleon Township statewide.

== Government ==
The township is governed by a three-member board of trustees, who are elected in November of odd-numbered years to a four-year term beginning on the following January 1. Two are elected in the year after the presidential election and one is elected in the year before it. There is also an elected township fiscal officer, who serves a four-year term beginning on April 1 of the year after the election, which is held in November of the year before the presidential election. Vacancies in the fiscal officership or on the board of trustees are filled by the remaining trustees.

Public education for the township is administered by the Napoleon Area City School District.
