= Monroe Township, Henry County, Ohio =

Township in Ohio, US

- Township
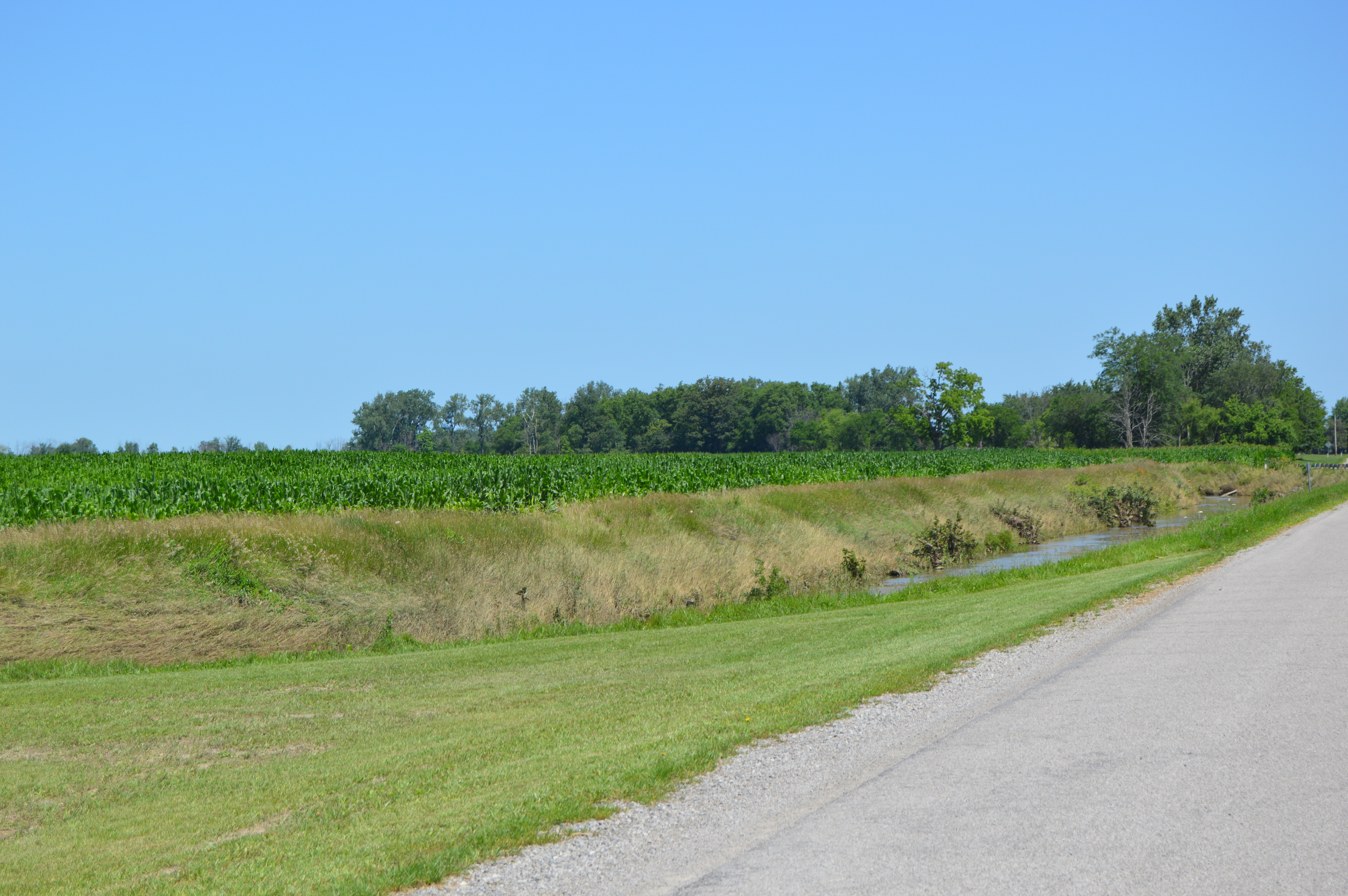
- South Turkeyfoot Creek along County Road 8

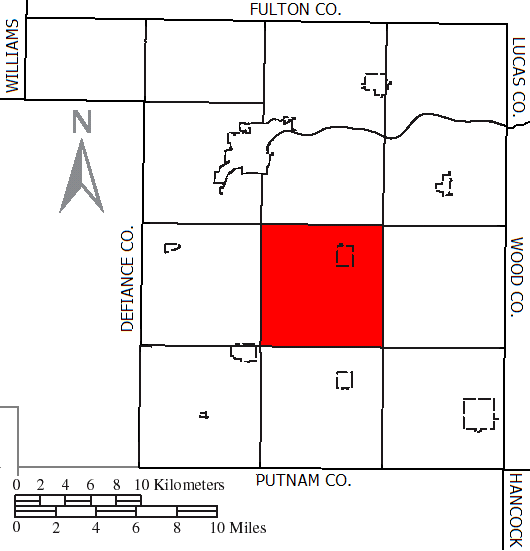
- Location of Monroe Township in Henry County
- Coordinates: 41°17′54″N 84°3′33″W
- Country: United States
- State: Ohio
- County: Henry

Area
  - Total: 36.4 sq mi (94.4 km^{2})
  - Land: 36.4 sq mi (94.4 km^{2})
  - Water: 0 sq mi (0.0 km^{2})
- Elevation: 686 ft (209 m)

Population (2020)
  - Total: 1,083
  - Density: 29.7/sq mi (11.5/km^{2})
- Time zone: UTC-5 (Eastern (EST))
  - Summer (DST): UTC-4 (EDT)
- FIPS code: 39-51408
- GNIS feature ID: 1086293

Monroe Township is one of the thirteen townships of Henry County, Ohio, United States. As of the 2020 census the population was 1,083.

== Geography ==
Located in the central part of the county, it borders the following townships:

- Harrison Township - north
- Damascus Township - northeast corner
- Richfield Township - east
- Bartlow Township - southeast corner
- Marion Township - south
- Pleasant Township - southwest corner
- Napoleon Township - west
- Flatrock Township - northwest corner

Monroe Township is one of only two townships in the county without a border on another county.

The village of Malinta is located in northeastern Monroe Township, and the unincorporated community of Grelton lies on its border with Richfield Township.

== Name and history ==
It is one of twenty-two Monroe Townships statewide.

== Government ==
The township is governed by a three-member board of trustees, who are elected in November of odd-numbered years to a four-year term beginning on the following January 1. Two are elected in the year after the presidential election and one is elected in the year before it. There is also an elected township fiscal officer, who serves a four-year term beginning on April 1 of the year after the election, which is held in November of the year before the presidential election. Vacancies in the fiscal officership or on the board of trustees are filled by the remaining trustees.
