= Elery, Ohio =

Unincorporated community in Ohio, U.S.

Coordinates: 41°17′54″N 84°04′07″W

Elery is an unincorporated community in Henry County, in the U.S. state of Ohio.

== History ==
A post office was established at Elery in 1881, and remained in operation until 1907. Besides the post office, Elery had a station on the New York, Chicago and St. Louis Railroad.
