= Liberty Center, Ohio =

- Village
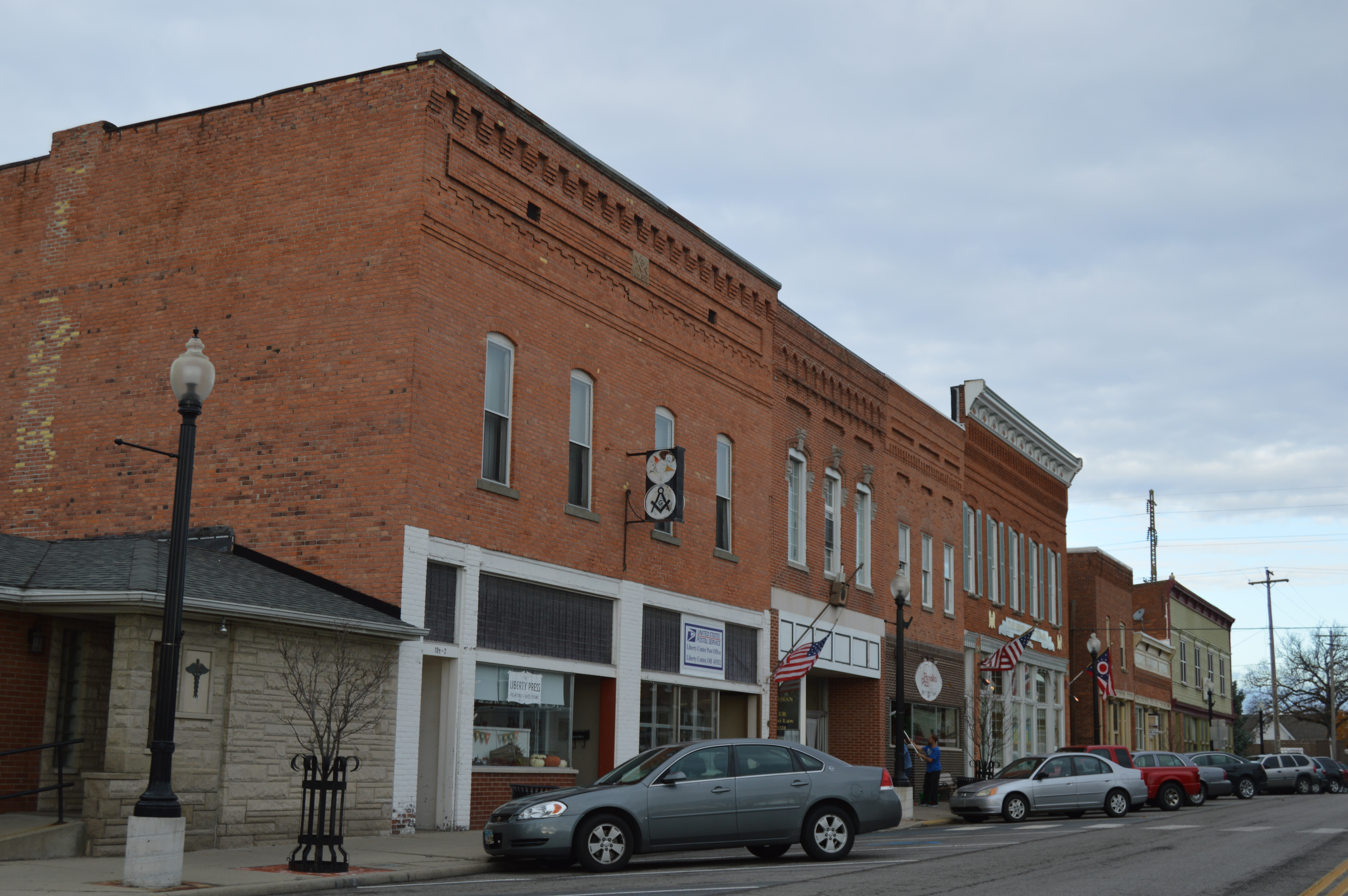
- East Street downtown

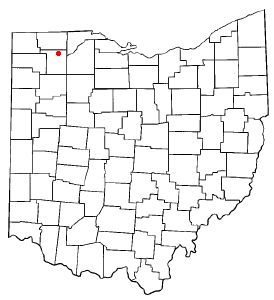
- Location of Liberty Center, Ohio

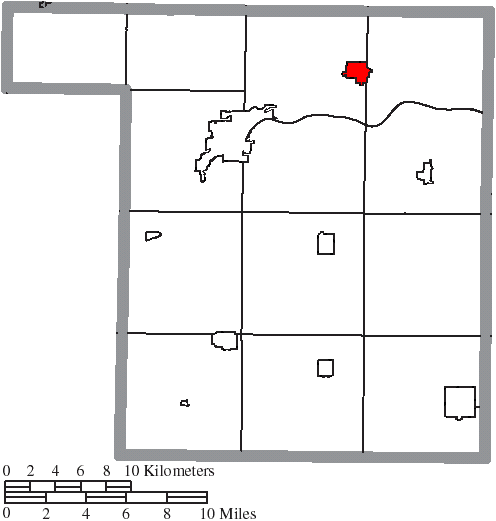
- Location of Liberty Center in Henry County
- Coordinates: 41°26′36″N 84°00′15″W
- Country: United States
- State: Ohio
- County: Henry
- Townships: Liberty, Washington

Government
  - Mayor: Jay Branson

Area
  - Total: 1.03 sq mi (2.68 km^{2})
  - Land: 1.03 sq mi (2.68 km^{2})
  - Water: 0 sq mi (0.00 km^{2})
- Elevation: 682 ft (208 m)

Population (2020)
  - Total: 1,108
  - Density: 1,072.7/sq mi (414.16/km^{2})
- Time zone: UTC-5 (Eastern (EST))
  - Summer (DST): UTC-4 (EDT)
- ZIP code: 43532
- Area code: 419
- FIPS code: 39-43414
- GNIS feature ID: 2398435
- Website: lcvillage.com

Liberty Center is a village in Henry County, Ohio, United States. The population was 1,108 at the 2020 census.

== History ==
A post office has been in operation at Liberty Center since 1858. The village derives its name from Liberty Township.

== Geography ==
According to the United States Census Bureau, the village has a total area of 1.04 square miles (2.69 km^{2}), all land.

== Demographics ==
Historical population
Census	Pop.	Note	%±
1880	504		—
1890	500		−0.8%
1900	606		21.2%
1910	647		6.8%
1920	635		−1.9%
1930	748		17.8%
1940	787		5.2%
1950	816		3.7%
1960	867		6.3%
1970	1,007		16.1%
1980	1,111		10.3%
1990	1,084		−2.4%
2000	1,109		2.3%
2010	1,180		6.4%
2020	1,108		−6.1%
U.S. Decennial Census

=== 2000 census ===
As of the census of 2000, there were 1,109 people, 424 households, and 306 families living in the village. The population density was 1,060.9 inhabitants per square mile (409.6/km^{2}). There were 449 housing units at an average density of 429.5 per square mile (165.8/km^{2}). The racial makeup of the village was 98.29% White, 0.09% Asian, 0.72% from other races, and 0.90% from two or more races. Hispanic or Latino of any race were 1.62% of the population.

There were 424 households, out of which 35.6% had children under the age of 18 living with them, 59.2% were married couples living together, 9.0% had a female householder with no husband present, and 27.8% were non-families. 23.1% of all households were made up of individuals, and 9.9% had someone living alone who was 65 years of age or older. The average household size was 2.62 and the average family size was 3.10.

In the village, the population was spread out, with 28.3% under the age of 18, 8.9% from 18 to 24, 29.5% from 25 to 44, 20.7% from 45 to 64, and 12.5% who were 65 years of age or older. The median age was 34 years. For every 100 females there were 94.9 males. For every 100 females age 18 and over, there were 91.1 males.

The median income for a household in the village was $40,395, and the median income for a family was $46,302. Males had a median income of $35,848 versus $21,597 for females. The per capita income for the village was $19,966. About 3.9% of families and 6.7% of the population were below the poverty line, including 10.4% of those under age 18 and 4.1% of those age 65 or over.

=== 2010 census ===
As of the census of 2010, there were 1,180 people, 446 households, and 316 families living in the village. The population density was 1,134.6 inhabitants per square mile (438.1/km^{2}). There were 485 housing units at an average density of 466.3 per square mile (180.0/km^{2}). The racial makeup of the village was 98.2% White, 0.1% African American, 0.1% Native American, 0.2% Asian, 0.3% from other races, and 1.2% from two or more races. Hispanic or Latino of any race were 3.3% of the population.

There were 446 households, of which 39.0% had children under the age of 18 living with them, 52.0% were married couples living together, 11.4% had a female householder with no husband present, 7.4% had a male householder with no wife present, and 29.1% were non-families. 26.2% of all households were made up of individuals, and 10.3% had someone living alone who was 65 years of age or older. The average household size was 2.65 and the average family size was 3.17.

The median age in the village was 33.9 years. 30.7% of residents were under the age of 18; 8.3% were between the ages of 18 and 24; 26% were from 25 to 44; 24.6% were from 45 to 64; and 10.7% were 65 years of age or older. The gender makeup of the village was 49.3% male and 50.7% female.

== Education ==
Public education for the village is administered by the Liberty Center Local School District. The District includes Liberty Center High School.
