= Defiance Township, Ohio =

Township in Ohio, US

Defiance Township, Defiance County, Ohio
- Township
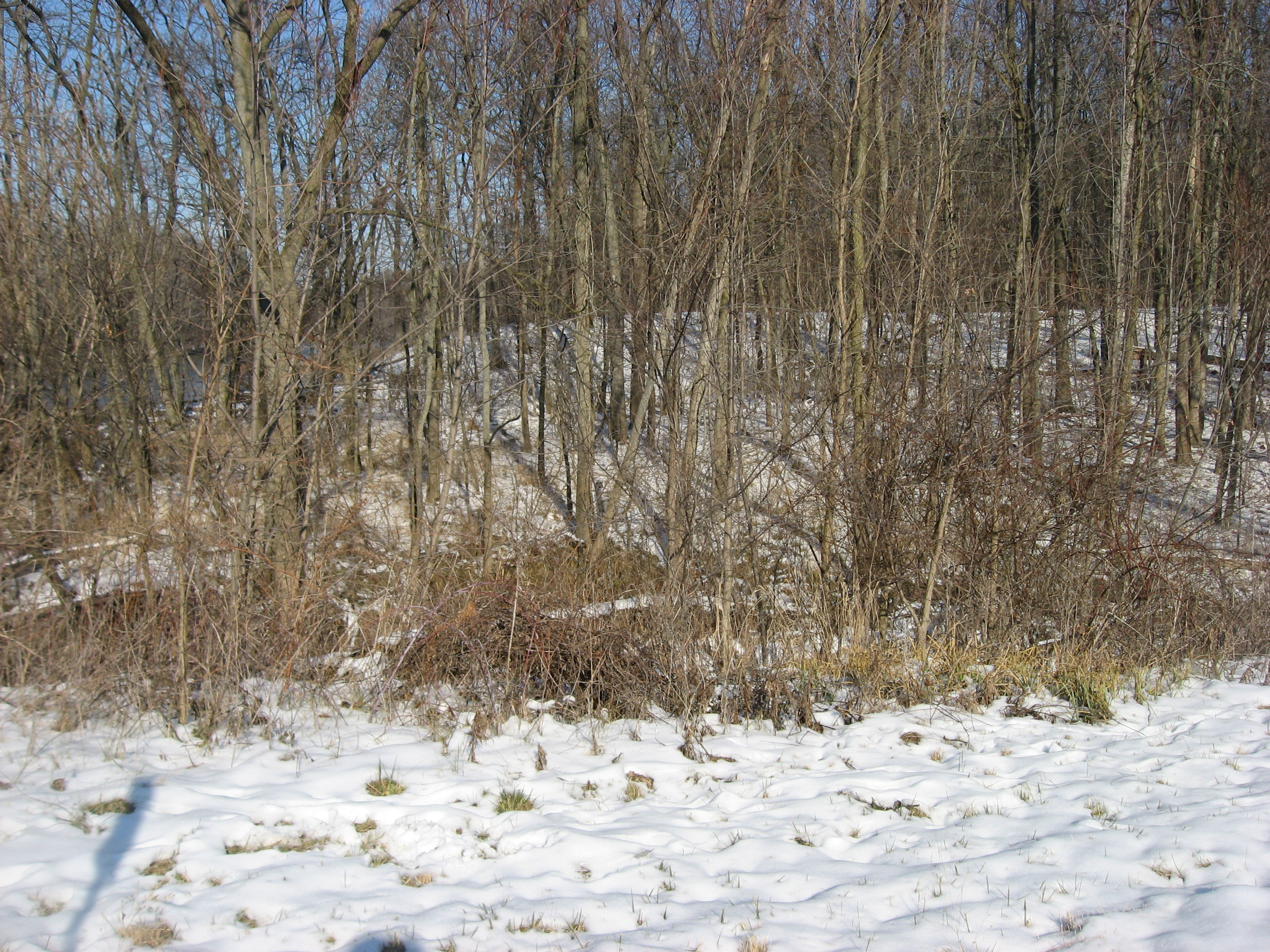
- The Brooke Site, an archaeological site in the township

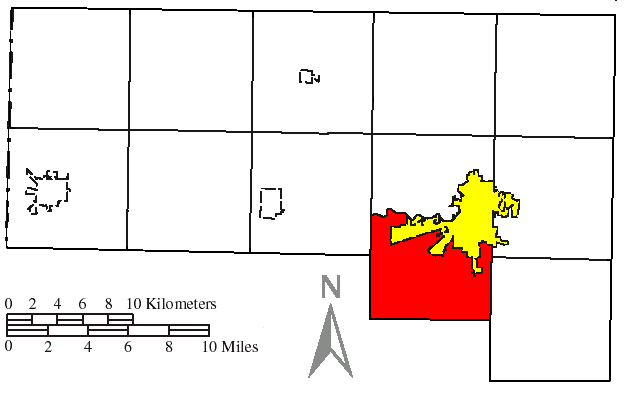
- Location of Defiance Township (red) in Defiance County, adjacent to the city of Defiance (yellow)
- Coordinates: 41°16′23″N 84°22′21″W
- Country: United States
- State: Ohio
- County: Defiance

Area
  - Total: 30.8 sq mi (79.9 km^{2})
  - Land: 29.8 sq mi (77.1 km^{2})
  - Water: 1.1 sq mi (2.9 km^{2})
- Elevation: 666 ft (203 m)

Population (2020)
  - Total: 13,216
  - Density: 444/sq mi (171/km^{2})
- Time zone: UTC-5 (Eastern (EST))
  - Summer (DST): UTC-4 (EDT)
- ZIP code: 43512
- Area code: 419
- FIPS code: 39-21322
- GNIS feature ID: 1086030

Defiance Township is one of the twelve townships of Defiance County, Ohio, United States. The 2020 census found 13,216 people in the township.

== Geography ==
Located in the southeastern part of the county, it borders the following townships:

- Noble Township - north
- Richland Township - northeast
- Highland Township - southeast
- Emerald Township, Paulding County - south
- Auglaize Township, Paulding County - southwest
- Delaware Township - northwest

A large part of the county seat of Defiance is located in northern Defiance Township.

== Name and history ==
It is the only Defiance Township statewide.

== Government ==
The township is governed by a three-member board of trustees, who are elected in November of odd-numbered years to a four-year term beginning on the following January 1. Two are elected in the year after the presidential election and one is elected in the year before it. There is also an elected township fiscal officer, who serves a four-year term beginning on April 1 of the year after the election, which is held in November of the year before the presidential election. Vacancies in the fiscal officership or on the board of trustees are filled by the remaining trustees.

== Transportation ==
U.S. Route 24 travels from east to west through the northwestern corner of Defiance Township. Other significant roads in the township include:

- State Route 15, which travels from north to south near the eastern edge of the township
- State Route 66, which travels from north to south through the eastern half of the township
- State Route 111, which travels from northeast to southwest along the Auglaize River through the center of the township
- State Route 424, which travels along the southern side of the Maumee River through the center of the township after breaking off from U.S. Route 24 in the township's west
