= Pleasant Bend, Ohio =

Unincorporated community in Ohio, U.S.

Coordinates: 41°10′49″N 84°11′24″W

Pleasant Bend is an unincorporated community in Henry County, in the U.S. state of Ohio.

== History ==
A post office called Pleasant Bend was established in 1879, the name was changed to Pleasantbend in 1896, and the post office closed in 1928. The community derives its name from the curve of railroad tracks at the original town site.
