= Monroe Township, Putnam County, Ohio =

Township in Ohio, US

- Township
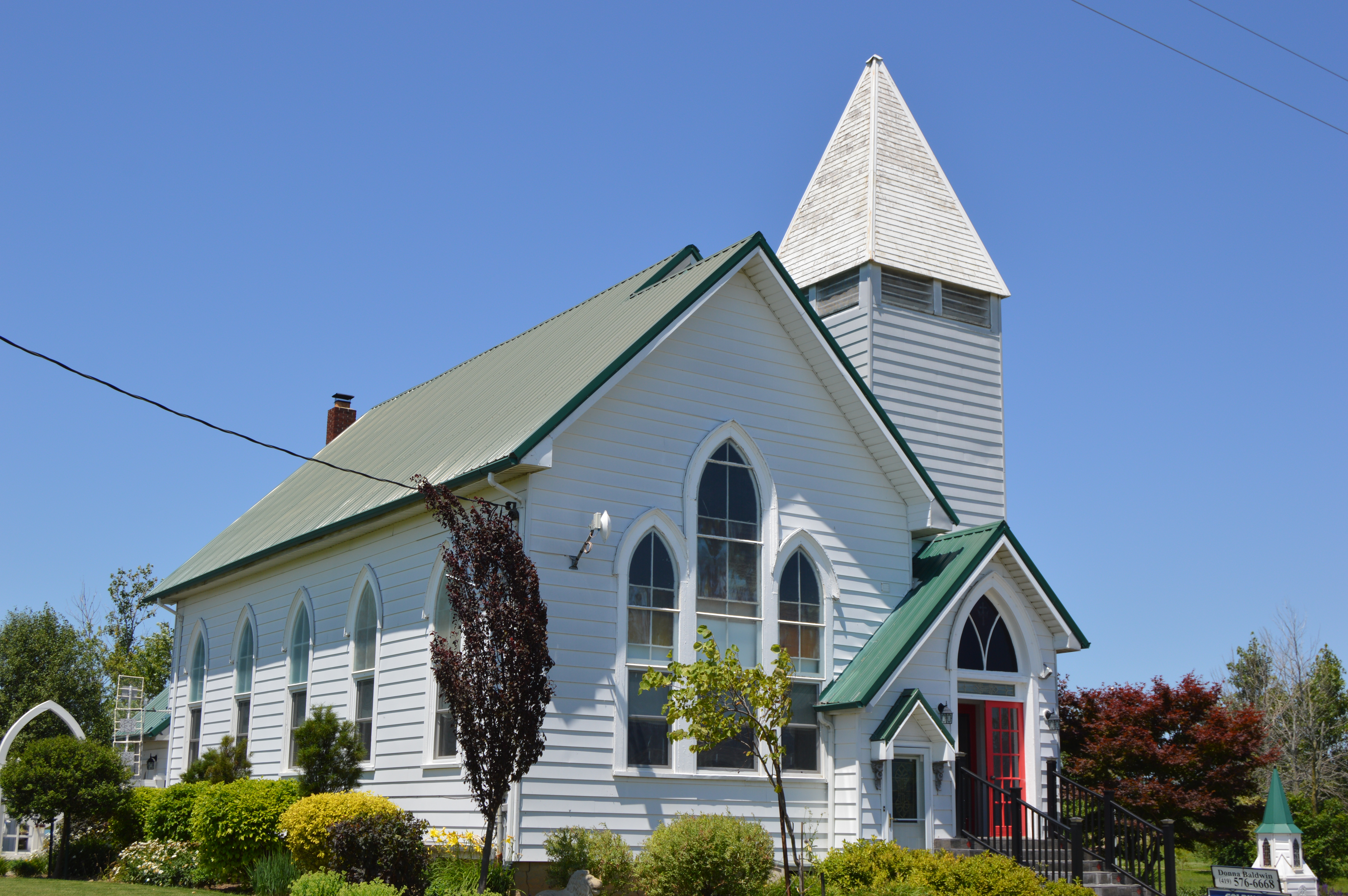
- Former Methodist church at Hartsburg

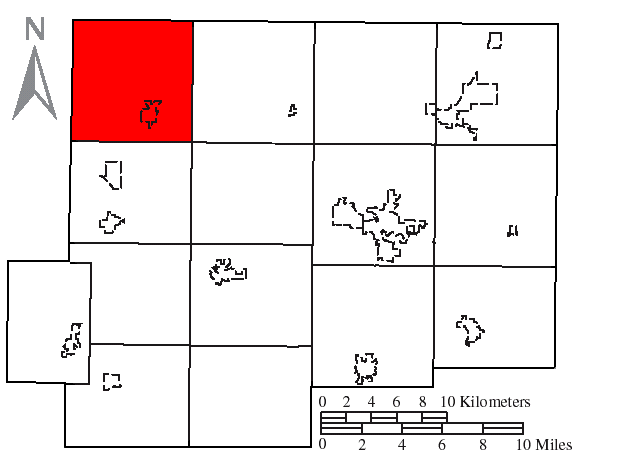
- Location of Monroe Township in Putnam County
- Coordinates: 41°6′40″N 84°16′33″W
- Country: United States
- State: Ohio
- County: Putnam

Area
  - Total: 35.9 sq mi (92.9 km^{2})
  - Land: 35.9 sq mi (92.9 km^{2})
  - Water: 0 sq mi (0.0 km^{2})
- Elevation: 715 ft (218 m)

Population (2020)
  - Total: 2,044
  - Density: 57.0/sq mi (22.0/km^{2})
- Time zone: UTC-5 (Eastern (EST))
  - Summer (DST): UTC-4 (EDT)
- FIPS code: 39-51562
- GNIS feature ID: 1086862

Monroe Township is one of the fifteen townships of Putnam County, Ohio, United States. The 2020 census found 2,044 people in the township.

== Geography ==
Located in the northwestern corner of the county, it borders the following townships:

- Highland Township, Defiance County - north
- Pleasant Township, Henry County - northeast corner
- Palmer Township - east
- Greensburg Township - southeast corner
- Perry Township - south
- Brown Township, Paulding County - west
- Auglaize Township, Paulding County - northwest corner

The village of Continental is located in southern Monroe Township.

== Name and history ==
Monroe Township was founded in 1852. It is one of twenty-two Monroe Townships statewide.

== Government ==
The township is governed by a three-member board of trustees, who are elected in November of odd-numbered years to a four-year term beginning on the following January 1. Two are elected in the year after the presidential election and one is elected in the year before it. There is also an elected township fiscal officer, who serves a four-year term beginning on April 1 of the year after the election, which is held in November of the year before the presidential election. Vacancies in the fiscal officership or on the board of trustees are filled by the remaining trustees.
