= Flatrock Township, Henry County, Ohio =

Township in Ohio, US

- Township
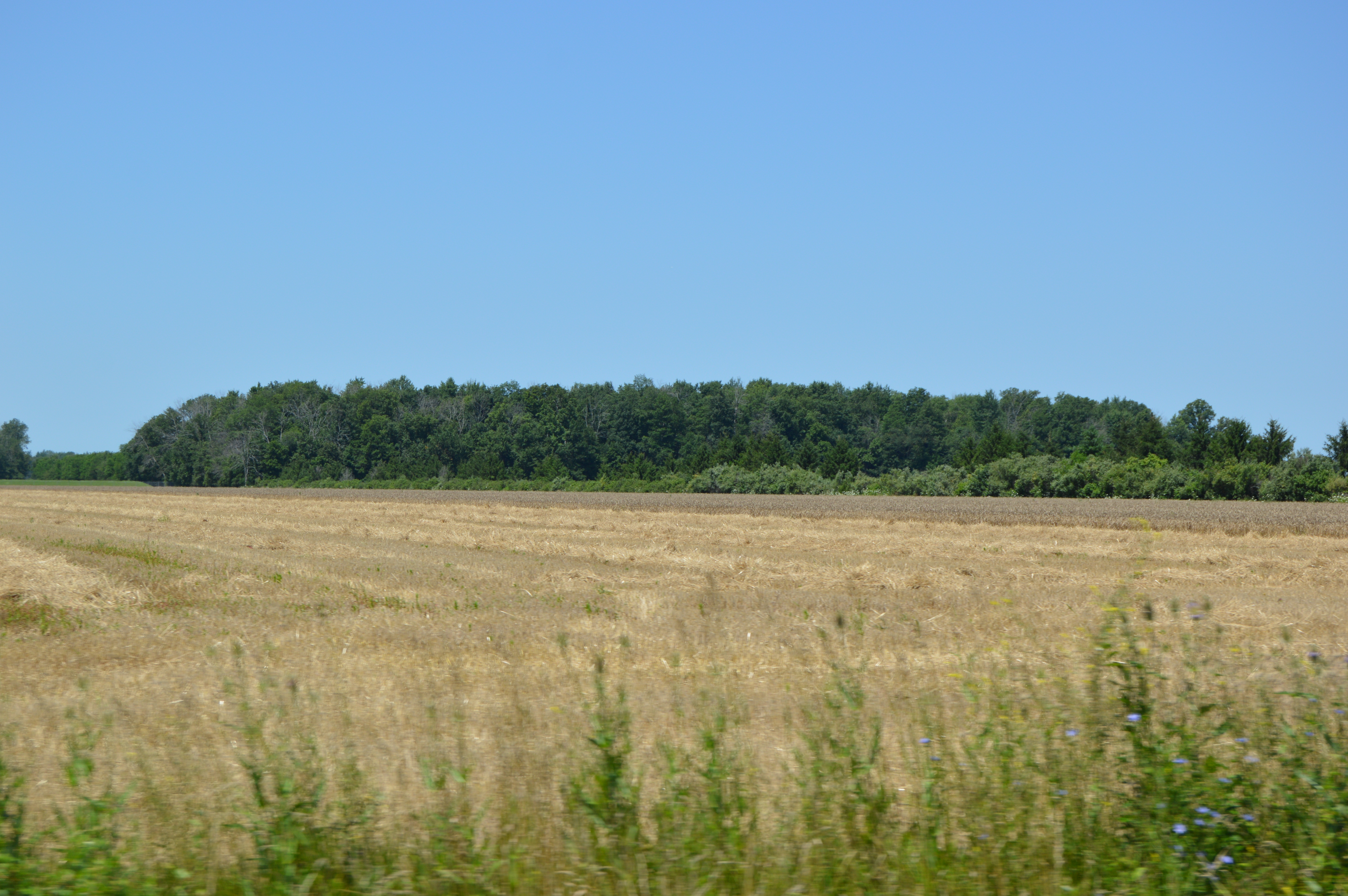
- Fields off Road 14 north of Holgate

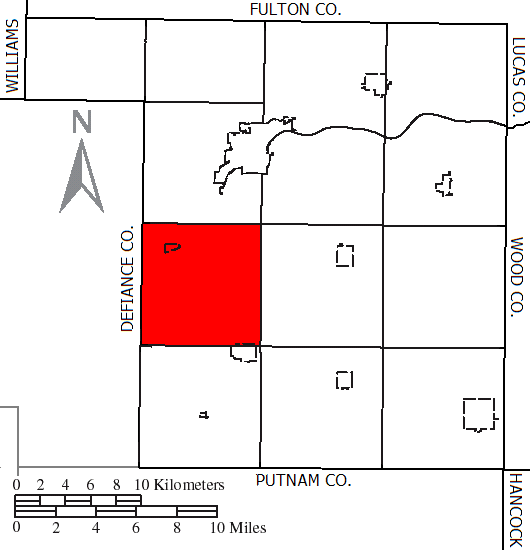
- Location of Flatrock Township in Henry County
- Coordinates: 41°17′58″N 84°9′56″W
- Country: United States
- State: Ohio
- County: Henry

Area
  - Total: 35.5 sq mi (91.9 km^{2})
  - Land: 34.9 sq mi (90.4 km^{2})
  - Water: 0.58 sq mi (1.5 km^{2})
- Elevation: 696 ft (212 m)

Population (2020)
  - Total: 1,248
  - Density: 35.8/sq mi (13.8/km^{2})
- Time zone: UTC-5 (Eastern (EST))
  - Summer (DST): UTC-4 (EDT)
- FIPS code: 39-27342
- GNIS feature ID: 1086288

Flatrock Township is one of the thirteen townships of Henry County, Ohio, United States. As of the 2020 census the population was 1,248.

== Geography ==
Located in the western part of the county, it borders the following townships:

- Napoleon Township - north
- Harrison Township - northeast corner
- Monroe Township - east
- Marion Township - southeast corner
- Pleasant Township - south
- Highland Township, Defiance County - southwest corner
- Richland Township, Defiance County - west
- Adams Township, Defiance County - northwest corner

The village of Florida is located in northwestern Flatrock Township, and a portion of the village of Holgate is in the southeastern part of the township.

== Name and history ==
It is the only Flatrock Township statewide.

== Government ==
The township is governed by a three-member board of trustees, who are elected in November of odd-numbered years to a four-year term beginning on the following January 1. Two are elected in the year after the presidential election and one is elected in the year before it. There is also an elected township fiscal officer, who serves a four-year term beginning on April 1 of the year after the election, which is held in November of the year before the presidential election. Vacancies in the fiscal officership or on the board of trustees are filled by the remaining trustees.

Trustees:

- Thomas J. Bortz (Term Ends 2017)
- Nicholas P. Franz (Term Ends 2017)
- Charles M. Eberle (Term Ends 2019)

Fiscal Officer: Anne M. Taylor (Term Ends 2019)

Zoning Inspector: Lauren Bunke
