= Grelton, Ohio =

Unincorporated community in Ohio, U.S.

Coordinates: 41°20′30″N 83°59′59″W

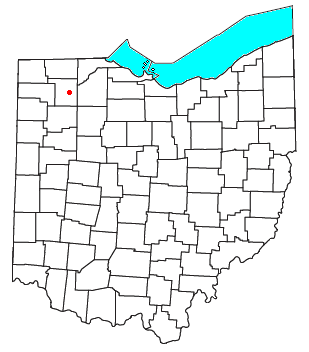
Location of Grelton, Ohio

Grelton is an unincorporated community on the borders of Monroe and Richfield Townships in Henry County, Ohio, United States. It has a post office with the ZIP code 43523. It is located on County Road 7 approximately two miles south of U.S. Route 6.
