= Palmer Township, Putnam County, Ohio =

Township in Ohio, US

- Township
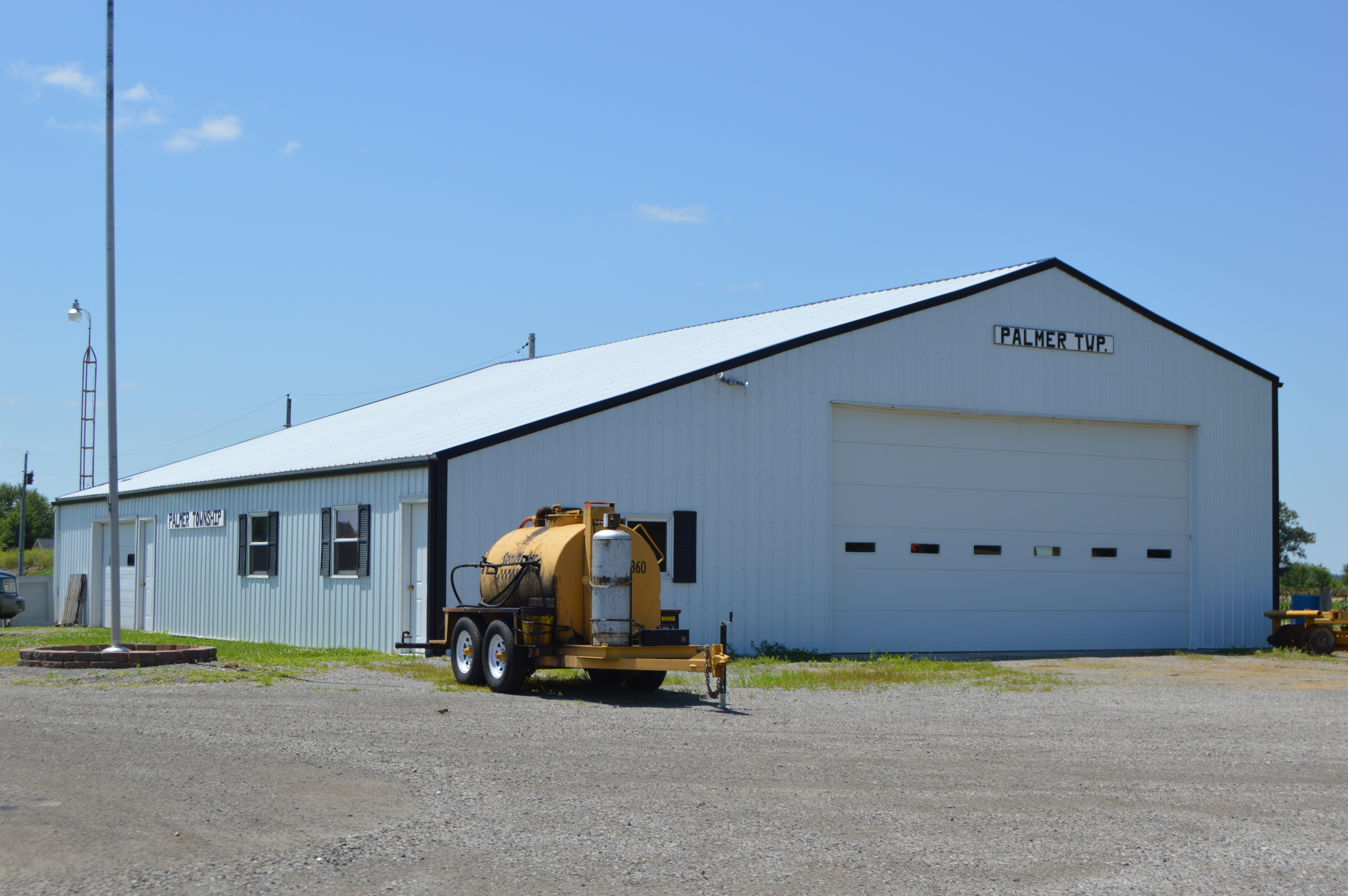
- Township hall near Miller City

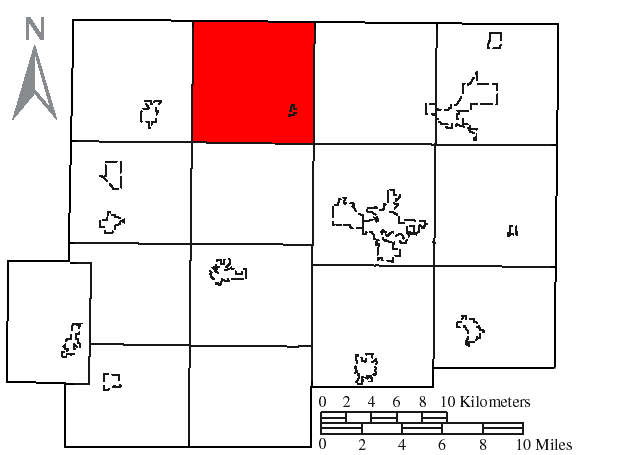
- Location of Palmer Township in Putnam County
- Coordinates: 41°7′30″N 84°9′54″W
- Country: United States
- State: Ohio
- County: Putnam

Area
  - Total: 36.3 sq mi (94.1 km^{2})
  - Land: 36.3 sq mi (94.1 km^{2})
  - Water: 0 sq mi (0.0 km^{2})
- Elevation: 720 ft (220 m)

Population (2020)
  - Total: 1,137
  - Density: 31.3/sq mi (12.1/km^{2})
- Time zone: UTC-5 (Eastern (EST))
  - Summer (DST): UTC-4 (EDT)
- FIPS code: 39-59612
- GNIS feature ID: 1086865

Palmer Township is one of the fifteen townships of Putnam County, Ohio, United States. The 2020 census found 1,137 people in the township.

== Geography ==
Located in the northern part of the county, it borders the following townships:

- Pleasant Township, Henry County - north
- Marion Township, Henry County - northeast corner
- Liberty Township - east
- Ottawa Township - southeast corner
- Greensburg Township - south
- Perry Township - southwest corner
- Monroe Township - west
- Highland Township, Defiance County - northwest corner

The village of Miller City is located in southeastern Palmer Township.

== Name and history ==
Palmer Township was organized in 1854. It was named for a local judge. Statewide, the only other Palmer Township is located in Washington County.

== Government ==
The township is governed by a three-member board of trustees, who are elected in November of odd-numbered years to a four-year term beginning on the following January 1. Two are elected in the year after the presidential election and one is elected in the year before it. There is also an elected township fiscal officer, who serves a four-year term beginning on April 1 of the year after the election, which is held in November of the year before the presidential election. Vacancies in the fiscal officership or on the board of trustees are filled by the remaining trustees.
