= Richland Township, Defiance County, Ohio =

Township in Ohio, US

- Township
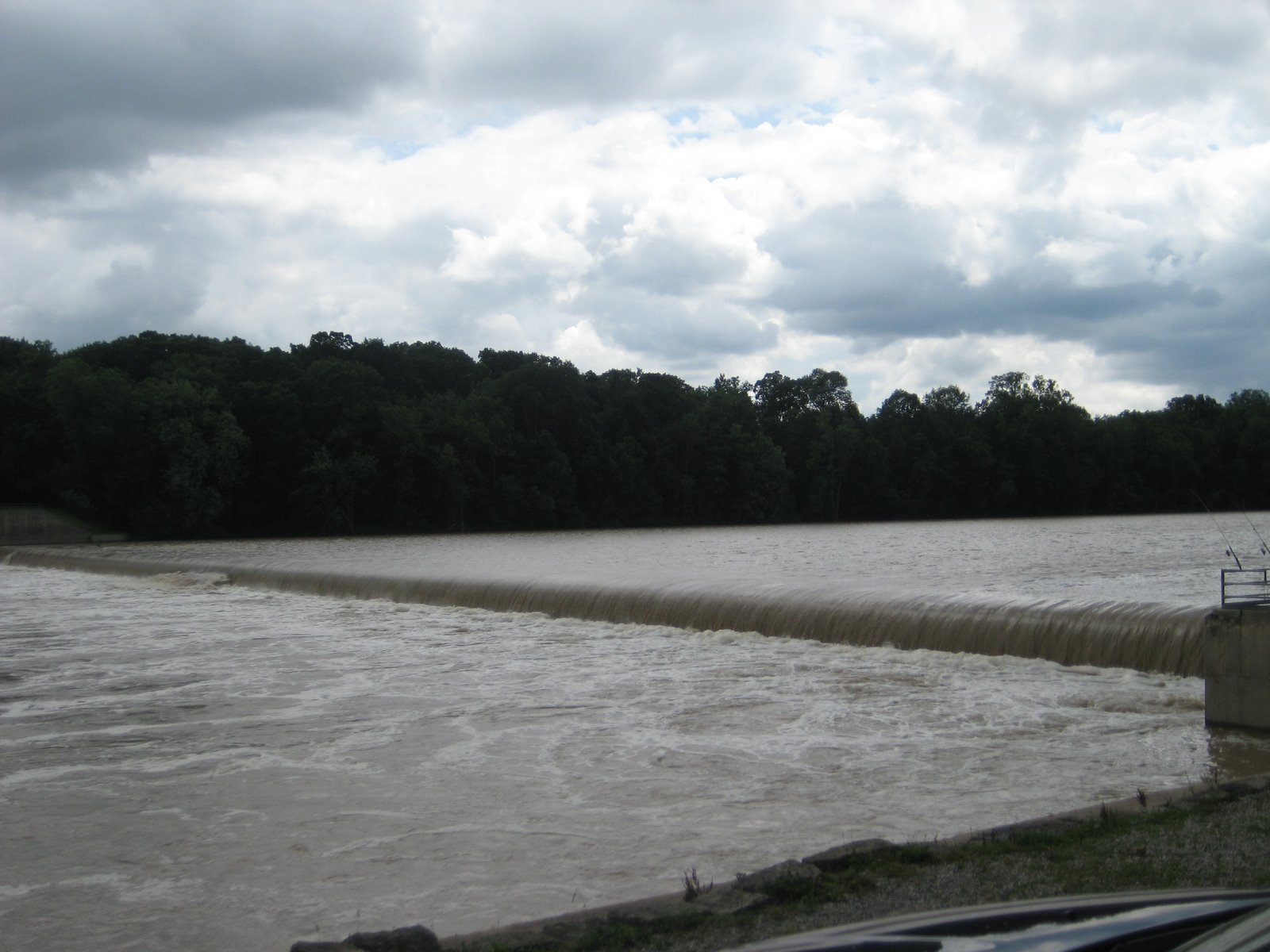
- Independence Dam State Park

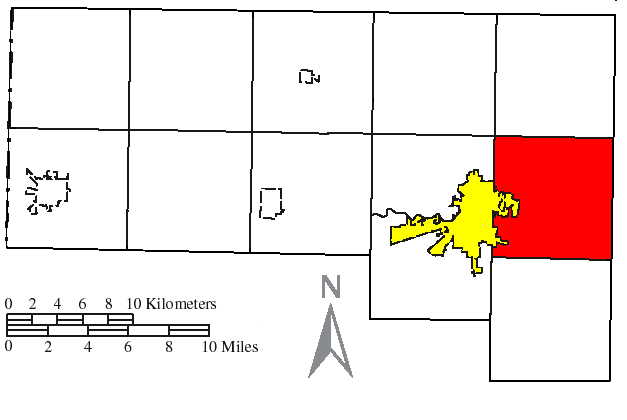
- Location of Richland Township in Defiance County
- Coordinates: 41°17′32″N 84°17′59″W
- Country: United States
- State: Ohio
- County: Defiance

Area
  - Total: 35.8 sq mi (92.7 km^{2})
  - Land: 35.0 sq mi (90.6 km^{2})
  - Water: 0.81 sq mi (2.1 km^{2})
- Elevation: 725 ft (221 m)

Population (2020)
  - Total: 3,063
  - Density: 87.6/sq mi (33.8/km^{2})
- Time zone: UTC-5 (Eastern (EST))
  - Summer (DST): UTC-4 (EDT)
- FIPS code: 39-66670
- GNIS feature ID: 1086038
- Website: https://www.richlandtownship.info/

Richland Township is one of the twelve townships of Defiance County, Ohio, United States. The 2020 census found 3,063 people in the township.

== Geography ==
Located in the eastern part of the county, it borders the following townships:

- Adams Township - north
- Napoleon Township, Henry County - northeast corner
- Flatrock Township, Henry County - east
- Pleasant Township, Henry County - southeast corner
- Highland Township - south
- Defiance Township - southwest
- Noble Township - west
- Tiffin Township - northwest

A small part of the county seat of Defiance is located in western Richland Township.

== Name and history ==
Richland Township was established in 1824. It is one of twelve Richland Townships statewide.

== Government ==
The township is governed by a three-member board of trustees, who are elected in November of odd-numbered years to a four-year term beginning on the following January 1. Two are elected in the year after the presidential election and one is elected in the year before it. There is also an elected township fiscal officer, who serves a four-year term beginning on April 1 of the year after the election, which is held in November of the year before the presidential election. Vacancies in the fiscal officership or on the board of trustees are filled by the remaining trustees.

== Transportation ==
U.S. Route 24 travels from northeast to southwest through the northern half of Richland Township. Other major roads in the township include:

- State Route 18, which travels from southeast to west through the southern half of the township
- State Route 281, which travels from east to west through the center of the township, and is concurrent with State Route 18 for a short time
- State Route 424, which travels along the north bank of the Maumee River through the center of the township
