= Freedom Township, Henry County, Ohio =

Township in Ohio, US

- Township
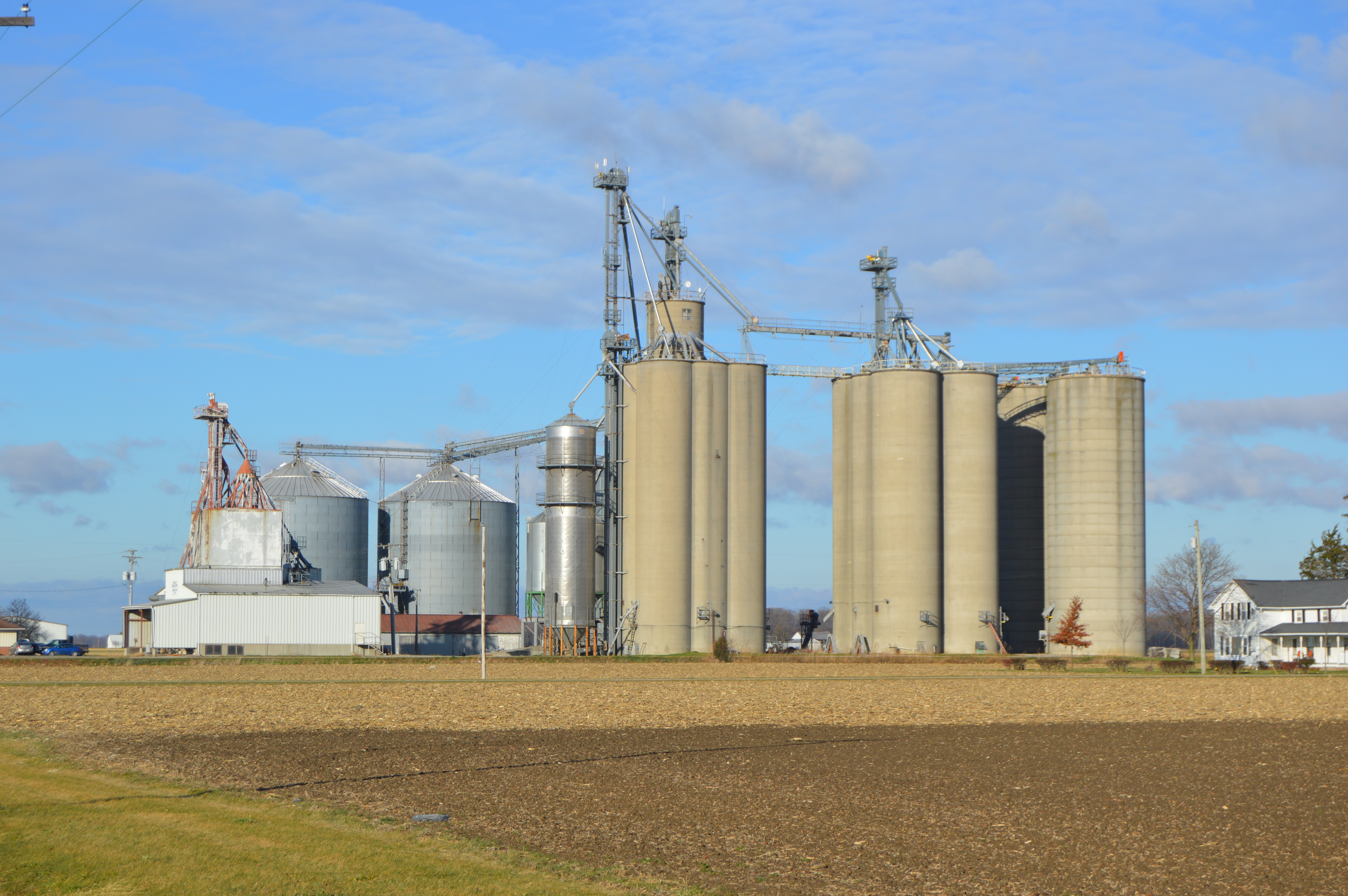
- Grain elevator at Gerald

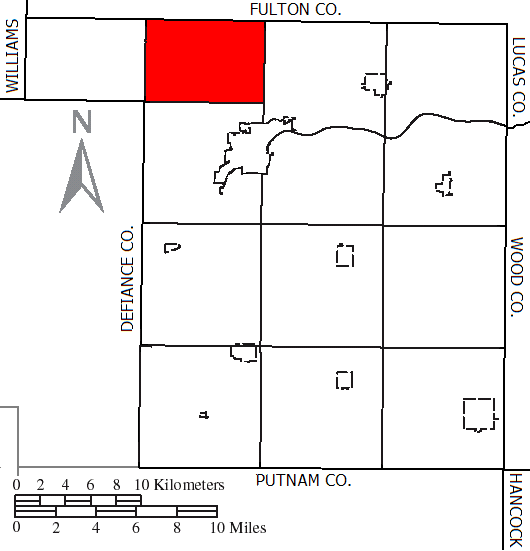
- Location of Freedom Township in Henry County
- Coordinates: 41°27′8″N 84°10′6″W
- Country: United States
- State: Ohio
- County: Henry

Area
  - Total: 23.6 sq mi (61.2 km^{2})
  - Land: 23.6 sq mi (61.2 km^{2})
  - Water: 0 sq mi (0.0 km^{2})
- Elevation: 705 ft (215 m)

Population (2020)
  - Total: 967
  - Density: 40.9/sq mi (15.8/km^{2})
- Time zone: UTC-5 (Eastern (EST))
  - Summer (DST): UTC-4 (EDT)
- FIPS code: 39-28700
- GNIS feature ID: 1086289

Freedom Township is one of the thirteen townships of Henry County, Ohio, United States. As of the 2020 census the population was 967.

== Geography ==
Located in the northwestern part of the county, it borders the following townships:

- Clinton Township, Fulton County - north
- York Township, Fulton County - northeast corner
- Liberty Township - east
- Napoleon Township - south
- Adams Township, Defiance County - southwest corner
- Ridgeville Township - west
- German Township, Fulton County - northwest corner

No municipalities are located in Freedom Township.

== Name and history ==
Statewide, other Freedom Townships are located in Portage and Wood counties.

== Government ==
The township is governed by a three-member board of trustees, who are elected in November of odd-numbered years to a four-year term beginning on the following January 1. Two are elected in the year after the presidential election and one is elected in the year before it. There is also an elected township fiscal officer, who serves a four-year term beginning on April 1 of the year after the election, which is held in November of the year before the presidential election. Vacancies in the fiscal officership or on the board of trustees are filled by the remaining trustees.
