= Henry County, Ohio =

County in Ohio, United States

- County
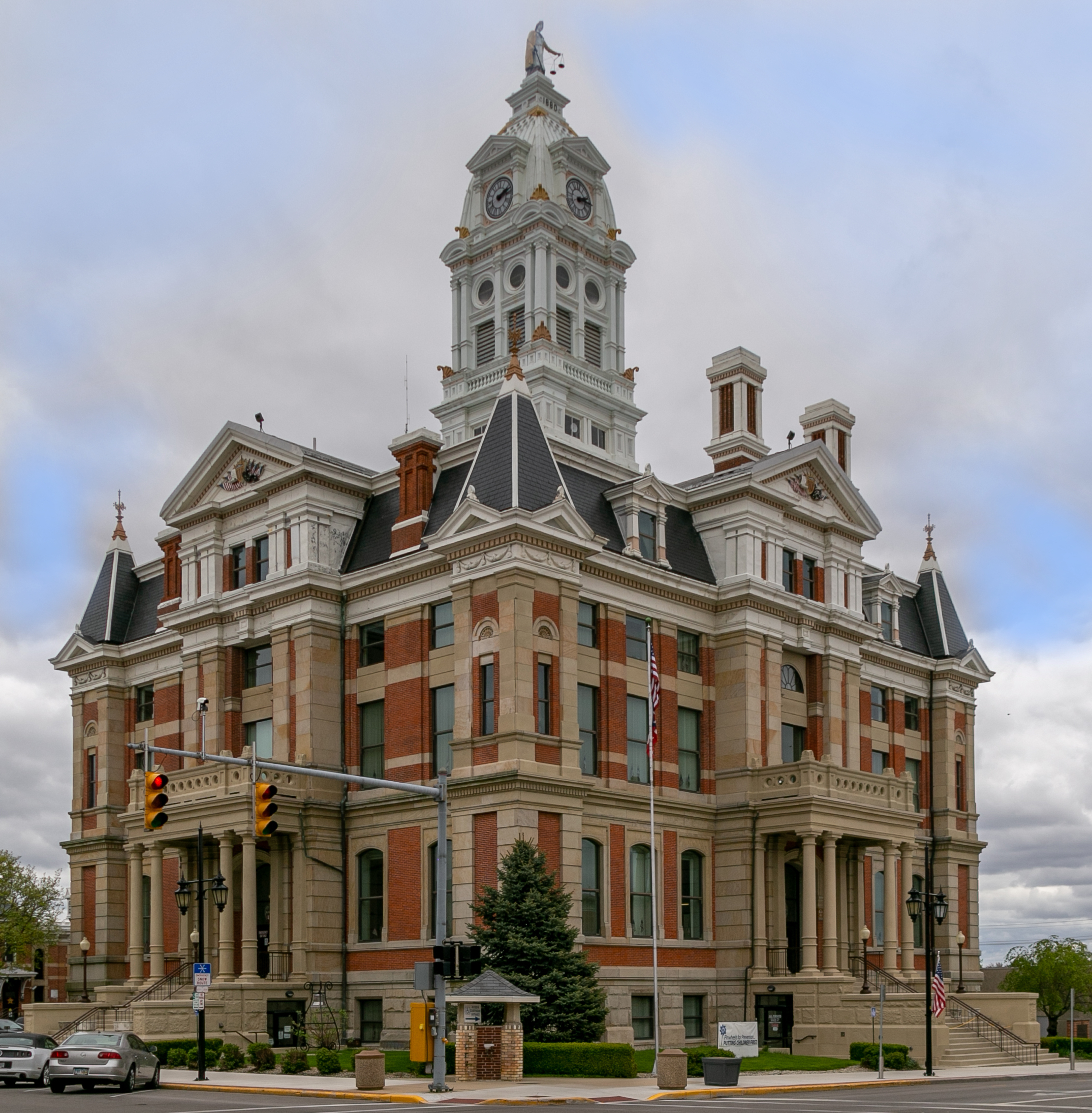
- Henry County Courthouse

- Flag Seal

- Location within the U.S. state of Ohio
- Coordinates: 41°20′N 84°04′W
- Country: United States
- State: Ohio
- Founded: December 26, 1834
- Named for: Patrick Henry
- Seat: Napoleon
- Largest city: Napoleon

Area
  - Total: 420 sq mi (1,100 km^{2})
  - Land: 416 sq mi (1,080 km^{2})
  - Water: 3.7 sq mi (9.6 km^{2}) 0.9%

Population (2020)
  - Total: 27,662
  - Estimate (2025): 27,598 ▼
  - Density: 66.5/sq mi (25.7/km^{2})
- Time zone: UTC−5 (Eastern)
  - Summer (DST): UTC−4 (EDT)
- Congressional district: 5th
- Website: www.henrycountyohio.gov

Henry County is a county located in the U.S. state of Ohio. As of the 2020 census, the population was 27,662. Its county seat is Napoleon. The county was created in 1820 and later organized in 1834. It is named for American Founding Father Patrick Henry, the Virginian famous for his "give me liberty or give me death!" speech.

== Geography ==
According to the U.S. Census Bureau, the county has a total area of 420 square miles (1,100 km^{2}), of which 416 square miles (1,080 km^{2}) is land and 3.7 square miles (9.6 km^{2}) (0.9%) is water.

=== Adjacent counties ===
- Fulton County (north)
- Lucas County (northeast)
- Wood County (east)
- Putnam County (south)
- Defiance County (west)
- Williams County (northwest)
- Hancock County (southeast)

== Demographics ==
Historical population
Census	Pop.	Note	%±
1830	262		—
1840	2,503		855.3%
1850	3,434		37.2%
1860	8,901		159.2%
1870	14,028		57.6%
1880	20,585		46.7%
1890	25,080		21.8%
1900	27,282		8.8%
1910	25,119		−7.9%
1920	23,362		−7.0%
1930	22,524		−3.6%
1940	22,756		1.0%
1950	22,423		−1.5%
1960	25,392		13.2%
1970	27,058		6.6%
1980	28,383		4.9%
1990	29,108		2.6%
2000	29,210		0.4%
2010	28,215		−3.4%
2020	27,662		−2.0%
2025 (est.)	27,598	▼	−0.2%
U.S. Decennial Census; 1790-1960 1900-1990; 1990-2000 2020

=== 2020 census ===
As of the 2020 census, the county had a population of 27,662. The median age was 42.3 years. 23.3% of residents were under the age of 18 and 19.7% of residents were 65 years of age or older. For every 100 females there were 99.2 males, and for every 100 females age 18 and over there were 98.2 males age 18 and over.

The racial makeup of the county was 91.3% White, 0.6% Black or African American, 0.4% American Indian and Alaska Native, 0.5% Asian, <0.1% Native Hawaiian and Pacific Islander, 2.7% from some other race, and 4.6% from two or more races. Hispanic or Latino residents of any race comprised 7.9% of the population.

32.1% of residents lived in urban areas, while 67.9% lived in rural areas.

There were 11,262 households in the county, of which 28.9% had children under the age of 18 living in them. Of all households, 52.4% were married-couple households, 18.5% were households with a male householder and no spouse or partner present, and 22.6% were households with a female householder and no spouse or partner present. About 28.7% of all households were made up of individuals and 13.7% had someone living alone who was 65 years of age or older.

There were 12,036 housing units, of which 6.4% were vacant. Among occupied housing units, 80.2% were owner-occupied and 19.8% were renter-occupied. The homeowner vacancy rate was 1.0% and the rental vacancy rate was 5.0%.

=== Racial and ethnic composition ===
Henry County, Ohio – racial and ethnic composition Note: the US Census treats Hispanic/Latino as an ethnic category. This table excludes Latinos from the racial categories and assigns them to a separate category. Hispanics/Latinos may be of any race.
Race / ethnicity (NH = Non-Hispanic)	Pop 1980	Pop 1990	Pop 2000	Pop 2010	Pop 2020	% 1980	% 1990	% 2000	% 2010	% 2020
White alone (NH)	26,952	27,487	27,151	25,861	24,463	94.96%	94.43%	92.95%	91.66%	88.44%
Black or African American alone (NH)	93	147	166	103	155	0.33%	0.51%	0.57%	0.37%	0.56%
Native American or Alaska Native alone (NH)	23	44	46	73	49	0.08%	0.15%	0.16%	0.26%	0.18%
Asian alone (NH)	44	87	124	103	125	0.16%	0.30%	0.42%	0.37%	0.45%
Native Hawaiian or Pacific Islander alone (NH)	x	x	0	0	4	x	x	0.00%	0.00%	0.01%
Other race alone (NH)	39	11	9	10	43	0.14%	0.04%	0.03%	0.04%	0.16%
Mixed-race or multiracial (NH)	x	x	138	205	636	x	x	0.47%	0.73%	2.30%
Hispanic or Latino (any race)	1,232	1,332	1,576	1,860	2,187	4.34%	4.58%	5.40%	6.59%	7.91%
Total	28,383	29,108	29,210	28,215	27,662	100.00%	100.00%	100.00%	100.00%	100.00%

=== 2010 census ===
As of the 2010 United States census, there were 28,215 people, 10,934 households, and 7,883 families living in the county. The population density was 67.8 inhabitants per square mile (26.2/km^{2}). There were 11,963 housing units at an average density of 28.8 units per square mile (11.1 units/km^{2}). The racial makeup of the county was 95.2% white, 0.4% black or African American, 0.4% Asian, 0.3% American Indian, 2.4% from other races, and 1.3% from two or more races. Those of Hispanic or Latino origin made up 6.6% of the population. In terms of ancestry, 53.7% were German, 10.6% were Irish, 7.1% were English; 6.9% identified as "American".

Of the 10,934 households, 33.3% had children under the age of 18 living with them, 58.2% were married couples living together, 9.3% had a female householder with no husband present, 27.9% were non-families, and 23.7% of all households were made up of individuals. The average household size was 2.55 and the average family size was 2.99. The median age was 39.8 years.

The median income for a household in the county was $48,367 and the median income for a family was $58,587. Males had a median income of $44,953 versus $32,127 for females. The per capita income for the county was $22,638. About 8.0% of families and 10.6% of the population were below the poverty line, including 13.5% of those under age 18 and 5.9% of those age 65 or over.

=== 2000 census ===
As of the census of 2000, there were 29,210 people, 10,935 households, and 7,960 families living in the county. The population density was 70 people per square mile (27 people/km^{2}). There were 11,622 housing units at an average density of 28 units per square mile (11/km^{2}). The racial makeup of the county was 95.33% White, 0.58% Black or African American, 0.26% Native American, 0.42% Asian, 2.56% from other races, and 0.85% from two or more races. 5.40% of the population were Hispanic or Latino of any race. 94.3% spoke English, 3.7% Spanish and 1.7% German as their first language.

There were 10,935 households, out of which 35.20% had children under the age of 18 living with them, 61.10% were married couples living together, 8.10% had a female householder with no husband present, and 27.20% were non-families. 23.50% of all households were made up of individuals, and 10.40% had someone living alone who was 65 years of age or older. The average household size was 2.62 and the average family size was 3.10.

In the county, the population was spread out, with 27.60% under the age of 18, 8.20% from 18 to 24, 28.10% from 25 to 44, 22.10% from 45 to 64, and 14.00% who were 65 years of age or older. The median age was 36 years. For every 100 females there were 97.60 males. For every 100 females age 18 and over, there were 93.60 males.

The median income for a household in the county was $42,657, and the median income for a family was $49,881. Males had a median income of $35,901 versus $24,076 for females. The per capita income for the county was $18,667. About 5.30% of families and 7.00% of the population were below the poverty line, including 9.90% of those under age 18 and 4.20% of those age 65 or over.

== Politics ==
Prior to 1912, Henry County was a stronghold Democratic county in presidential elections. From 1912 to 1936, it was a bellwether county, but starting with the 1940 election, it has become a Republican stronghold with Lyndon B. Johnson in 1964 being the lone Democrat to win since then.

United States presidential election results for Henry County, Ohio
Year	Republican		Democratic		Third party(ies)	
Year	No.	%	No.	%	No.	%
1856	587	46.44%	655	51.82%	22	1.74%
1860	808	43.60%	1,039	56.07%	6	0.32%
1864	830	40.06%	1,242	59.94%	0	0.00%
1868	1,156	42.19%	1,584	57.81%	0	0.00%
1872	1,160	42.76%	1,510	55.66%	43	1.58%
1876	1,527	38.36%	2,445	61.42%	9	0.23%
1880	1,738	37.44%	2,871	61.85%	33	0.71%
1884	1,982	37.86%	3,196	61.05%	57	1.09%
1888	2,047	35.29%	3,583	61.77%	171	2.95%
1892	1,981	35.48%	3,312	59.32%	290	5.19%
1896	2,558	36.91%	4,323	62.37%	50	0.72%
1900	2,623	38.35%	4,157	60.77%	60	0.88%
1904	2,707	45.85%	3,102	52.54%	95	1.61%
1908	2,425	37.81%	3,817	59.52%	171	2.67%
1912	804	15.36%	2,994	57.20%	1,436	27.44%
1916	2,482	42.33%	3,252	55.47%	129	2.20%
1920	5,738	66.10%	2,829	32.59%	114	1.31%
1924	3,855	45.51%	2,922	34.50%	1,693	19.99%
1928	5,370	59.29%	3,647	40.27%	40	0.44%
1932	3,067	30.10%	6,987	68.58%	134	1.32%
1936	4,108	38.51%	5,472	51.29%	1,088	10.20%
1940	7,784	68.93%	3,508	31.07%	0	0.00%
1944	7,241	73.54%	2,605	26.46%	0	0.00%
1948	5,024	57.59%	3,689	42.29%	11	0.13%
1952	8,029	72.73%	3,010	27.27%	0	0.00%
1956	8,164	74.63%	2,775	25.37%	0	0.00%
1960	8,251	70.73%	3,415	29.27%	0	0.00%
1964	5,094	46.57%	5,845	53.43%	0	0.00%
1968	6,970	63.21%	3,256	29.53%	800	7.26%
1972	8,099	70.58%	3,145	27.41%	231	2.01%
1976	7,656	61.40%	4,592	36.82%	222	1.78%
1980	7,584	66.01%	3,059	26.63%	846	7.36%
1984	9,317	76.54%	2,779	22.83%	77	0.63%
1988	8,618	69.12%	3,764	30.19%	86	0.69%
1992	6,196	46.38%	3,933	29.44%	3,230	24.18%
1996	6,385	49.94%	4,762	37.25%	1,638	12.81%
2000	8,530	64.37%	4,367	32.95%	355	2.68%
2004	9,902	65.55%	5,111	33.84%	92	0.61%
2008	8,239	55.47%	6,320	42.55%	293	1.97%
2012	8,257	57.92%	5,658	39.69%	342	2.40%
2016	9,301	66.19%	3,756	26.73%	996	7.09%
2020	10,479	70.86%	4,062	27.47%	247	1.67%
2024	10,873	72.61%	3,905	26.08%	197	1.32%

United States Senate election results for Henry County, Ohio1
Year	Republican		Democratic		Third party(ies)	
Year	No.	%	No.	%	No.	%
2024	9,685	66.32%	4,356	29.83%	562	3.85%

== Government ==
Henry County has a three-member Board of County Commissioners that oversee the various county departments, similar to 85 of the other 88 Ohio counties. The county commissioners are Lori Siclair, Glenn Miller, and Robert Hastedt.

== Transportation ==
=== Airport ===
Henry County Airport is a public use airport located 3 nautical miles (6 km) east of the central business district of Napoleon, Ohio. It is owned by the Henry County Airport Authority.

== Communities ==
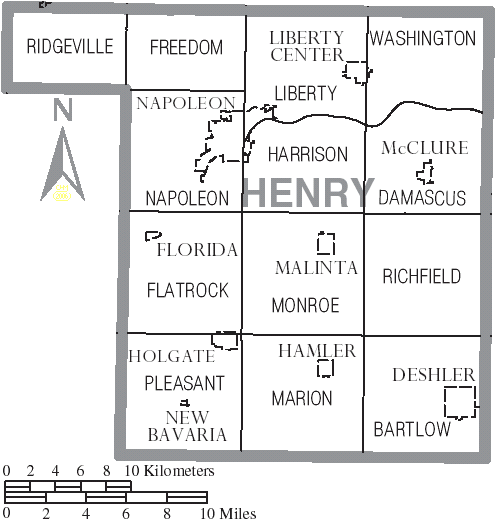
Map of Henry County, with municipal and township labels

=== City ===
- Napoleon (county seat)

=== Villages ===
- Deshler
- Florida
- Hamler
- Holgate
- Liberty Center
- Malinta
- McClure
- New Bavaria

=== Townships ===
- Bartlow
- Damascus
- Flatrock
- Freedom
- Harrison
- Liberty
- Marion
- Monroe
- Napoleon
- Pleasant
- Richfield
- Ridgeville
- Washington

=== Census-designated place ===
- Ridgeville Corners

=== Unincorporated communities ===
- Colton
- Elery
- Gerald
- Grelton
- Okolona
- Pleasant Bend
- Texas

== See also ==
- National Register of Historic Places listings in Henry County, Ohio
