= New Bavaria, Ohio =

- Village
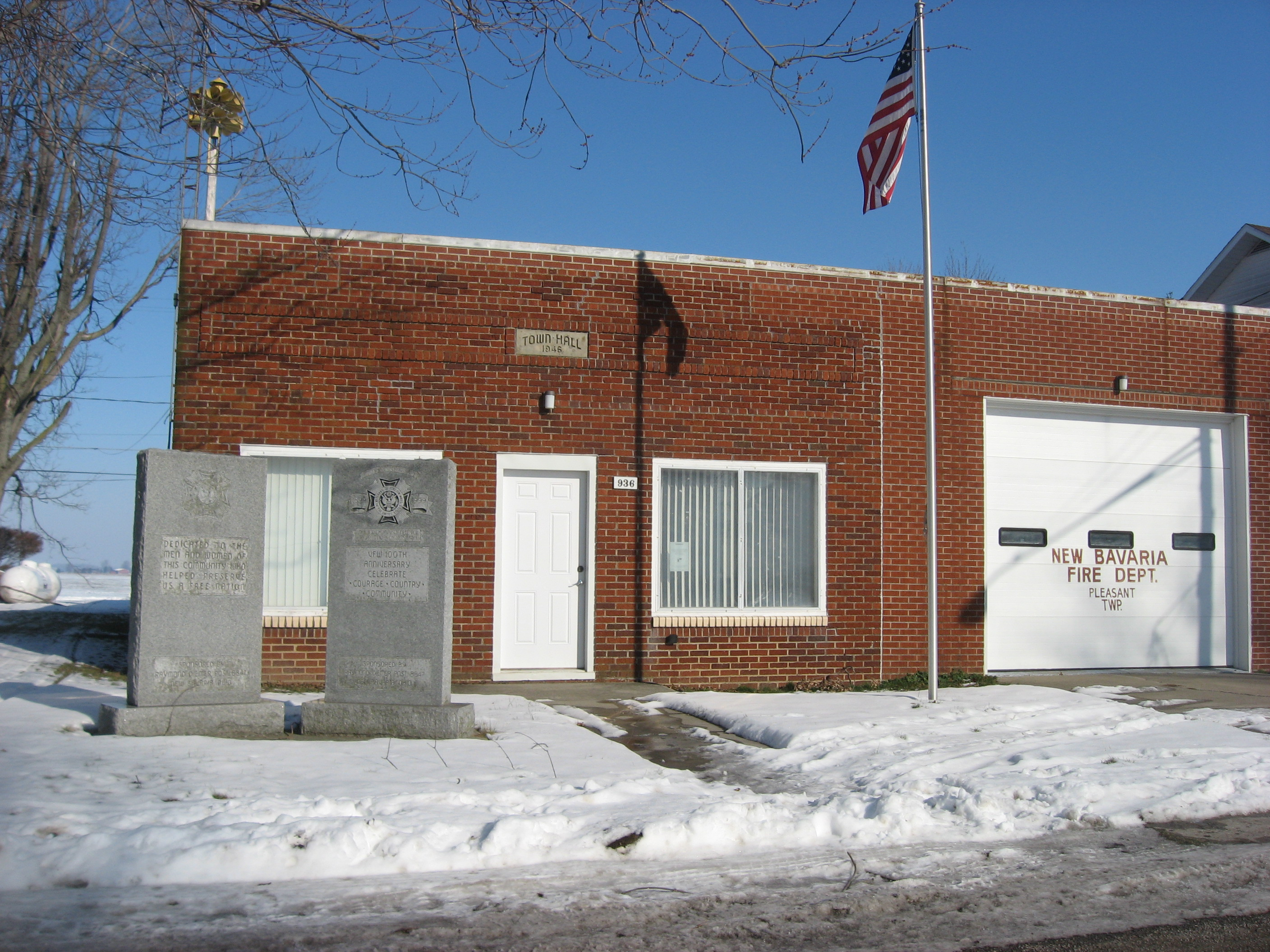
- Village Hall

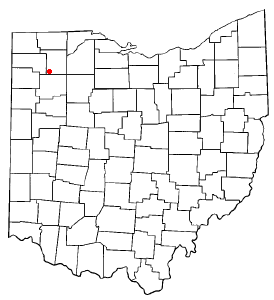
- Location of New Bavaria, Ohio

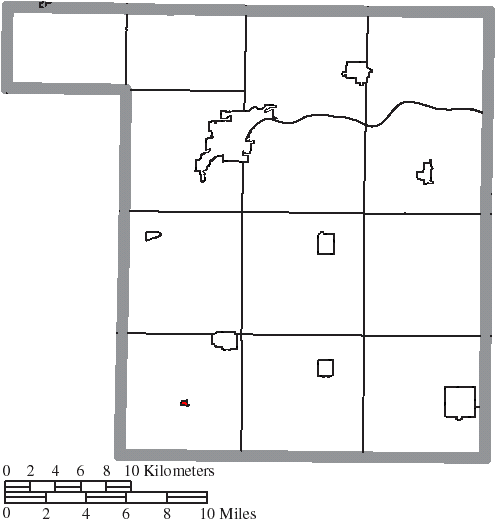
- Location of New Bavaria in Henry County
- Coordinates: 41°12′13″N 84°10′02″W
- Country: United States
- State: Ohio
- County: Henry

Government
  - Type: Village Council

Area
  - Total: 0.069 sq mi (0.18 km^{2})
  - Land: 0.069 sq mi (0.18 km^{2})
  - Water: 0 sq mi (0.00 km^{2})
- Elevation: 735 ft (224 m)

Population (2020)
  - Total: 86
  - Density: 1,229.4/sq mi (474.69/km^{2})
- Time zone: UTC-5 (Eastern (EST))
  - Summer (DST): UTC-4 (EDT)
- ZIP code: 43548
- Area code: 419
- FIPS code: 39-54110
- GNIS feature ID: 2399454

New Bavaria is a village in Henry County, Ohio, United States. The population was 86 at the 2020 census.

== History ==
New Bavaria was platted in 1882. The village was named after Bavaria, in Germany, the native land of a large share of the first settlers. A post office called New Bavaria has been in operation since 1848.

== Geography ==
According to the United States Census Bureau, the village has a total area of 0.07 square miles (0.18 km^{2}), all land.

== Demographics ==
Historical population
Census	Pop.	Note	%±
1950	132		—
1960	153		15.9%
1970	149		−2.6%
1980	135		−9.4%
1990	92		−31.9%
2000	78		−15.2%
2010	99		26.9%
2020	86		−13.1%
2021 (est.)	86	Steady	0.0%
U.S. Decennial Census

=== 2010 census ===
As of the census of 2010, there were 99 people, 40 households, and 25 families living in the village. The population density was 1,414.3 inhabitants per square mile (546.1/km^{2}). There were 44 housing units at an average density of 628.6 per square mile (242.7/km^{2}). The racial makeup of the village was 98.0% White and 2.0% from other races. Hispanic or Latino of any race were 5.1% of the population.

There were 40 households, of which 35.0% had children under the age of 18 living with them, 52.5% were married couples living together, 5.0% had a female householder with no husband present, 5.0% had a male householder with no wife present, and 37.5% were non-families. 35.0% of all households were made up of individuals, and 5% had someone living alone who was 65 years of age or older. The average household size was 2.48 and the average family size was 3.20.

The median age in the village was 35.8 years. 30.3% of residents were under the age of 18; 4% were between the ages of 18 and 24; 33.4% were from 25 to 44; 21.3% were from 45 to 64; and 11.1% were 65 years of age or older. The gender makeup of the village was 53.5% male and 46.5% female.

=== 2000 census ===
As of the census of 2000, there were 78 people, 35 households, and 21 families living in the village. The population density was 1,263.5 inhabitants per square mile (487.8/km^{2}). There were 39 housing units at an average density of 631.7 per square mile (243.9/km^{2}). The racial makeup of the village was 98.72% White and 1.28% Asian. The ancestry make up was 40.8% German, 11.8% American, 11.8% Swedish, 3.9% Italian, 2.6% Swiss, and 2.6% of other ancestries.

There were 35 households, out of which 20.0% had children under the age of 18 living with them, 51.4% were married couples living together, 8.6% had a female householder with no husband present, and 40.0% were non-families. 28.6% of all households were made up of individuals, and 11.4% had someone living alone who was 65 years of age or older. The average household size was 2.23 and the average family size was 2.81.

In the village, the population was spread out, with 20.5% under the age of 18, 10.3% from 18 to 24, 28.2% from 25 to 44, 25.6% from 45 to 64, and 15.4% who were 65 years of age or older. The median age was 38 years. For every 100 females there were 105.3 males. For every 100 females age 18 and over, there were 113.8 males.

The median income for a household in the village was $37,813, and the median income for a family was $39,688. Males had a median income of $36,667 versus $23,750 for females. The per capita income for the village was $19,371. There were 9.5% of families and 6.6% of the population living below the poverty line, including no under eighteens and none of those over 64.

== Education ==
Public education for the village is administered by the Holgate Local School District.
