= Auglaize Township, Paulding County, Ohio =

Township in Ohio, US

- Township
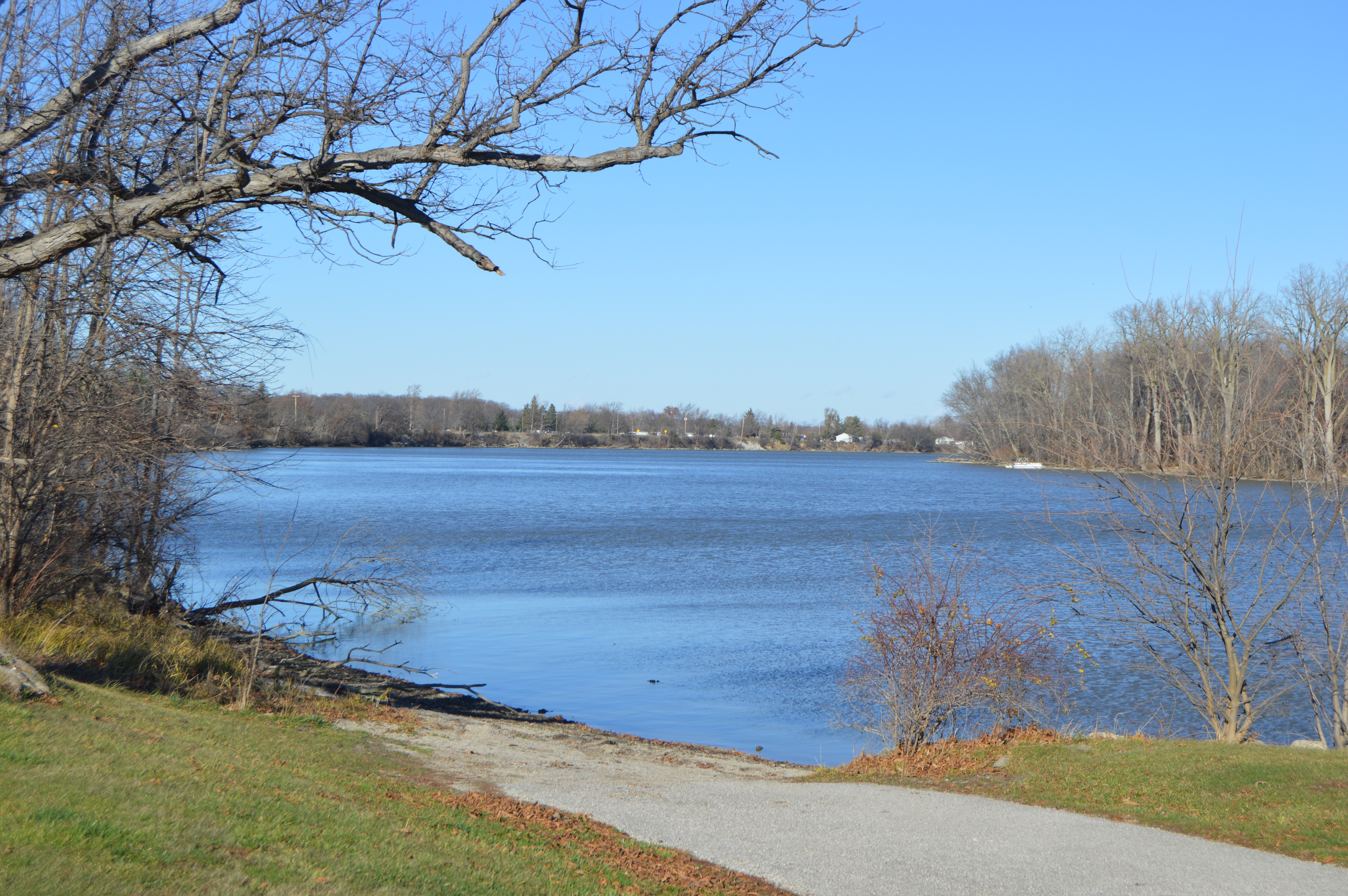
- The Auglaize River near Junction

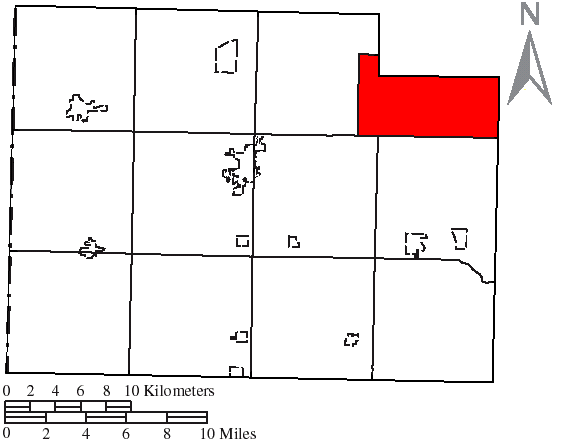
- Location of Auglaize Township in Paulding County
- Coordinates: 41°11′44″N 84°26′27″W
- Country: United States
- State: Ohio
- County: Paulding

Area
  - Total: 22.2 sq mi (57.5 km^{2})
  - Land: 21.5 sq mi (55.7 km^{2})
  - Water: 0.69 sq mi (1.8 km^{2})
- Elevation: 712 ft (217 m)

Population (2020)
  - Total: 1,332
  - Density: 62/sq mi (23.9/km^{2})
- Time zone: UTC-5 (Eastern (EST))
  - Summer (DST): UTC-4 (EDT)
- FIPS code: 39-03002
- GNIS feature ID: 1086766
- Website: https://www.auglaizetwp.us/

Auglaize Township is one of the twelve townships of Paulding County, Ohio, United States. The 2020 census found 1,332 people in the township.

== Geography ==
Located in the northeastern corner of the county, it borders the following townships:

- Defiance Township, Defiance County – north
- Highland Township, Defiance County – east
- Monroe Township, Putnam County – southeast corner
- Brown Township – south
- Jackson Township – southwest
- Emerald Township – west

No municipalities are located in Auglaize Township, although the unincorporated community of Junction lies in the township's west.

== Name and history ==
Statewide, the only other Auglaize Township is located in Allen County. Ohio also has an Auglaize County, which is named for the Auglaize River.

== Government ==
The township is governed by a three-member board of trustees, who are elected in November of odd-numbered years to a four-year term beginning on the following January 1. Two are elected in the year after the presidential election and one is elected in the year before it. There is also an elected township fiscal officer, who serves a four-year term beginning on April 1 of the year after the election, which is held in November of the year before the presidential election. Vacancies in the fiscal officership or on the board of trustees are filled by the remaining trustees.
