= Highland Township, Defiance County, Ohio =

Township in Ohio, US

- Township
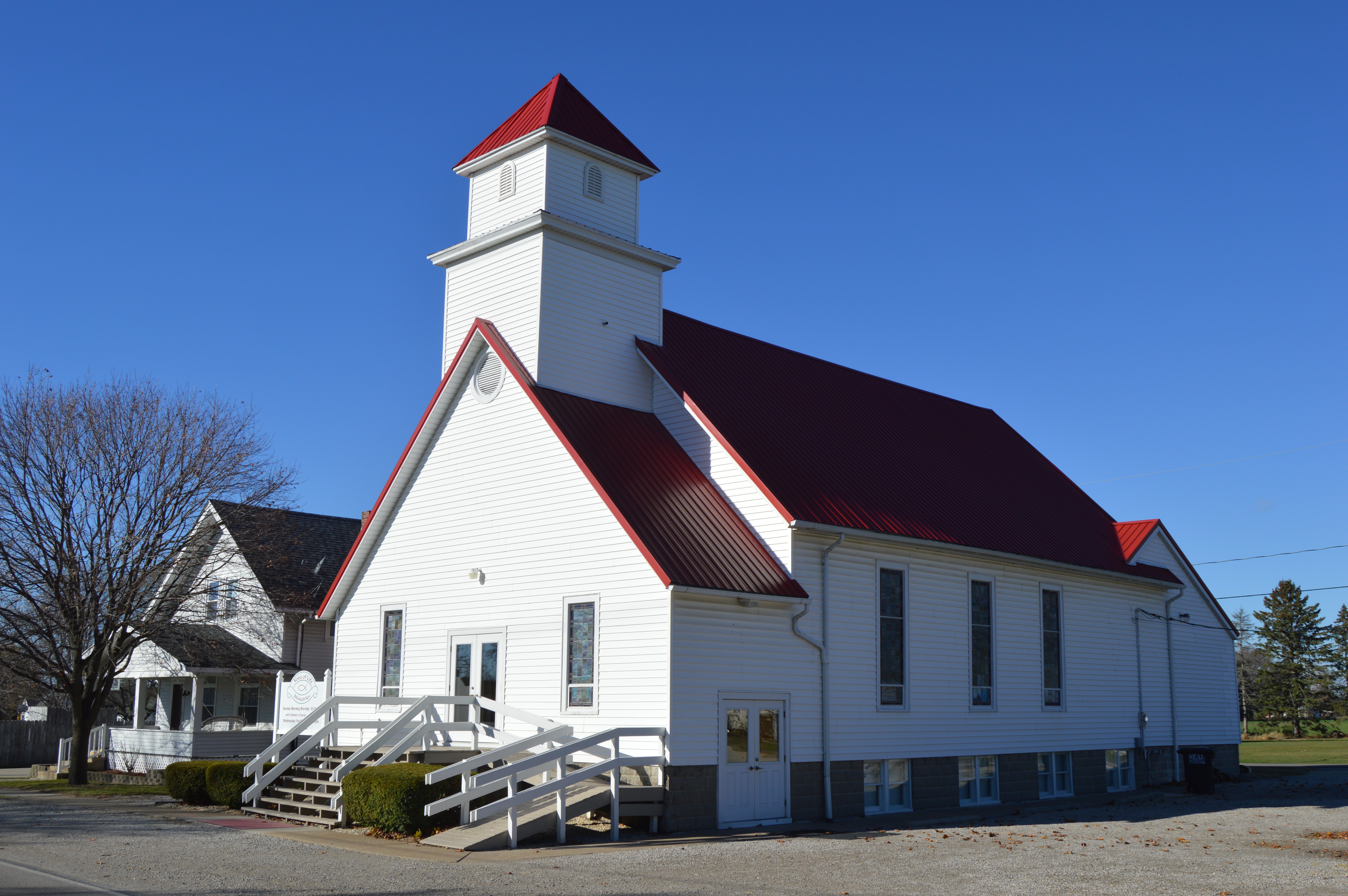
- Methodist church at Ayersville

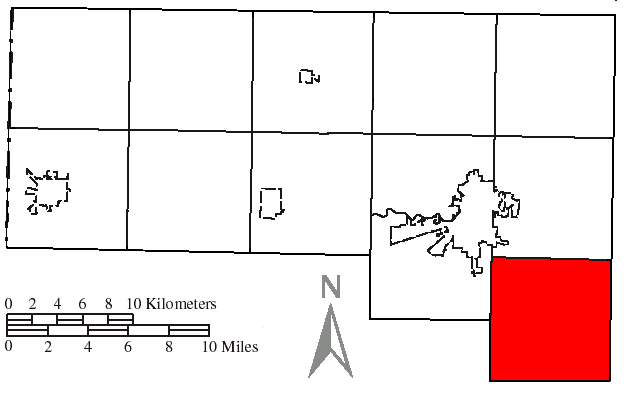
- Location of Highland Township in Defiance County
- Coordinates: 41°12′40″N 84°17′24″W
- Country: United States
- State: Ohio
- County: Defiance

Area
  - Total: 36.0 sq mi (93.3 km^{2})
  - Land: 36.0 sq mi (93.3 km^{2})
  - Water: 0 sq mi (0.0 km^{2})
- Elevation: 715 ft (218 m)

Population (2020)
  - Total: 2,284
  - Density: 63.4/sq mi (24.5/km^{2})
- Time zone: UTC-5 (Eastern (EST))
  - Summer (DST): UTC-4 (EDT)
- FIPS code: 39-35196
- GNIS feature ID: 1086034

Highland Township is one of the twelve townships of Defiance County, Ohio, United States. The population at the 2020 census was 2,284.

== Geography ==
Located in the southeastern corner of the county, it borders the following townships:

- Richland Township - north
- Flatrock Township, Henry County - northeast corner
- Pleasant Township, Henry County - east
- Palmer Township, Putnam County - southeast corner
- Monroe Township, Putnam County - south
- Brown Township, Paulding County - southwest corner
- Auglaize Township, Paulding County - west
- Defiance Township - northwest

No municipalities are located in Highland Township.

== Name and history ==
Highland Township was established in 1842. Statewide, the only other Highland Township is located in Muskingum County.

== Government ==
The township is governed by a three-member board of trustees, who are elected in November of odd-numbered years to a four-year term beginning on the following January 1. Two are elected in the year after the presidential election and one is elected in the year before it. There is also an elected township fiscal officer, who serves a four-year term beginning on April 1 of the year after the election, which is held in November of the year before the presidential election. Vacancies in the fiscal officership or on the board of trustees are filled by the remaining trustees.

== Transportation ==
Two significant highways in Highland Township are State Route 15, which travels from north to south through the western half of the township; and State Route 18, which travels from east to west on the eastern part of the township's border with Richland Township to the north.
