= Gerald, Ohio =

Unincorporated community in Ohio, U.S.

Coordinates: 41°27′25″N 84°08′39″W

Gerald is an unincorporated community in Henry County, in the U.S. state of Ohio.

== History ==
A post office was established at Gerald in 1898, and remained in operation until 1907. The community was named after Gerald Donnelly, the son of a railroad promoter.
