= Holgate, Ohio =

- Village
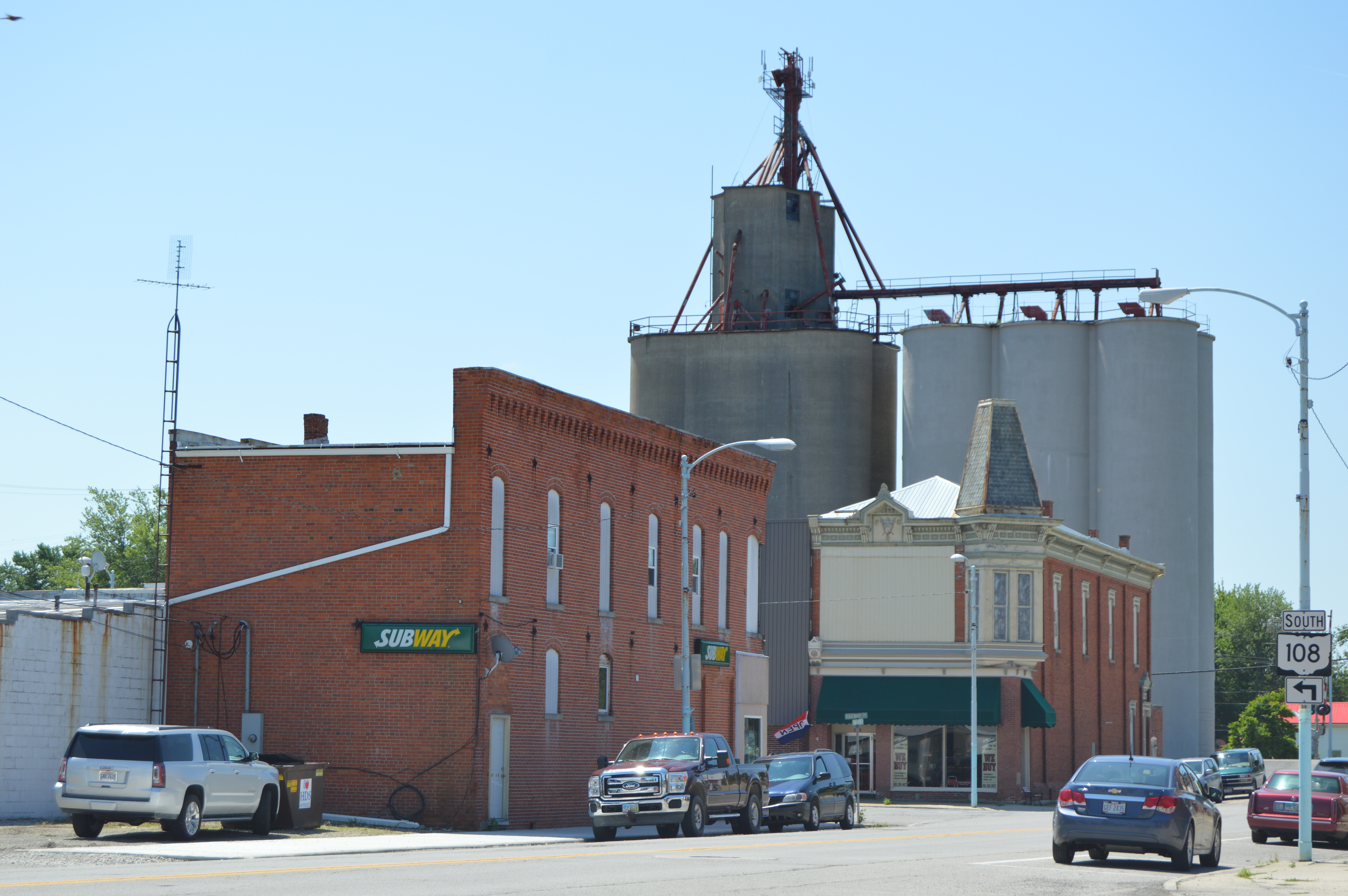
- Wilhelm Street downtown
- Nickname: H-town
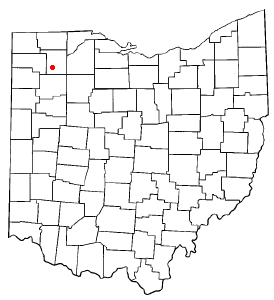
- Location of Holgate, Ohio

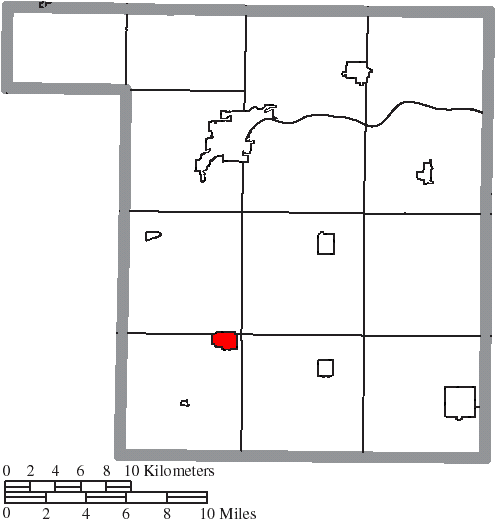
- Location of Holgate in Henry County
- Coordinates: 41°14′58″N 84°07′45″W
- Country: United States
- State: Ohio
- County: Henry

Government
  - Type: Village Council
  - Mayor: Elva Posadas

Area
  - Total: 1.15 sq mi (2.99 km^{2})
  - Land: 1.15 sq mi (2.99 km^{2})
  - Water: 0 sq mi (0.00 km^{2})
- Elevation: 712 ft (217 m)

Population (2020)
  - Total: 1,061
  - Estimate (2023): 1,043
  - Density: 919.4/sq mi (354.98/km^{2})
- Time zone: UTC-5 (Eastern (EST))
  - Summer (DST): UTC-4 (EDT)
- ZIP code: 43527
- Area code: 419
- FIPS code: 39-35854
- GNIS feature ID: 2398521
- Website: https://www.holgateohio.com/

Holgate is a village in Henry County, Ohio, United States. The population was 1,061 at the 2020 census.

== History ==
Holgate, formerly known as Kaufmanville, was platted in 1873 when the railroad was extended to that point and incorporated as a village in 1881. The village has the name of William Holgate, the original owner of the town site. A post office has been in operation since 1874.

== Geography ==
According to the United States Census Bureau, the village has a total area of 1.15 square miles (2.98 km^{2}), all land.

== Demographics ==
Historical population
Census	Pop.	Note	%±
1880	595		—
1890	1,134		90.6%
1900	1,237		9.1%
1910	1,095		−11.5%
1920	1,039		−5.1%
1930	951		−8.5%
1940	1,050		10.4%
1950	1,092		4.0%
1960	1,374		25.8%
1970	1,541		12.2%
1980	1,315		−14.7%
1990	1,290		−1.9%
2000	1,194		−7.4%
2010	1,109		−7.1%
2020	1,061		−4.3%
2023 (est.)	1,043	▼	−1.7%
U.S. Decennial Census

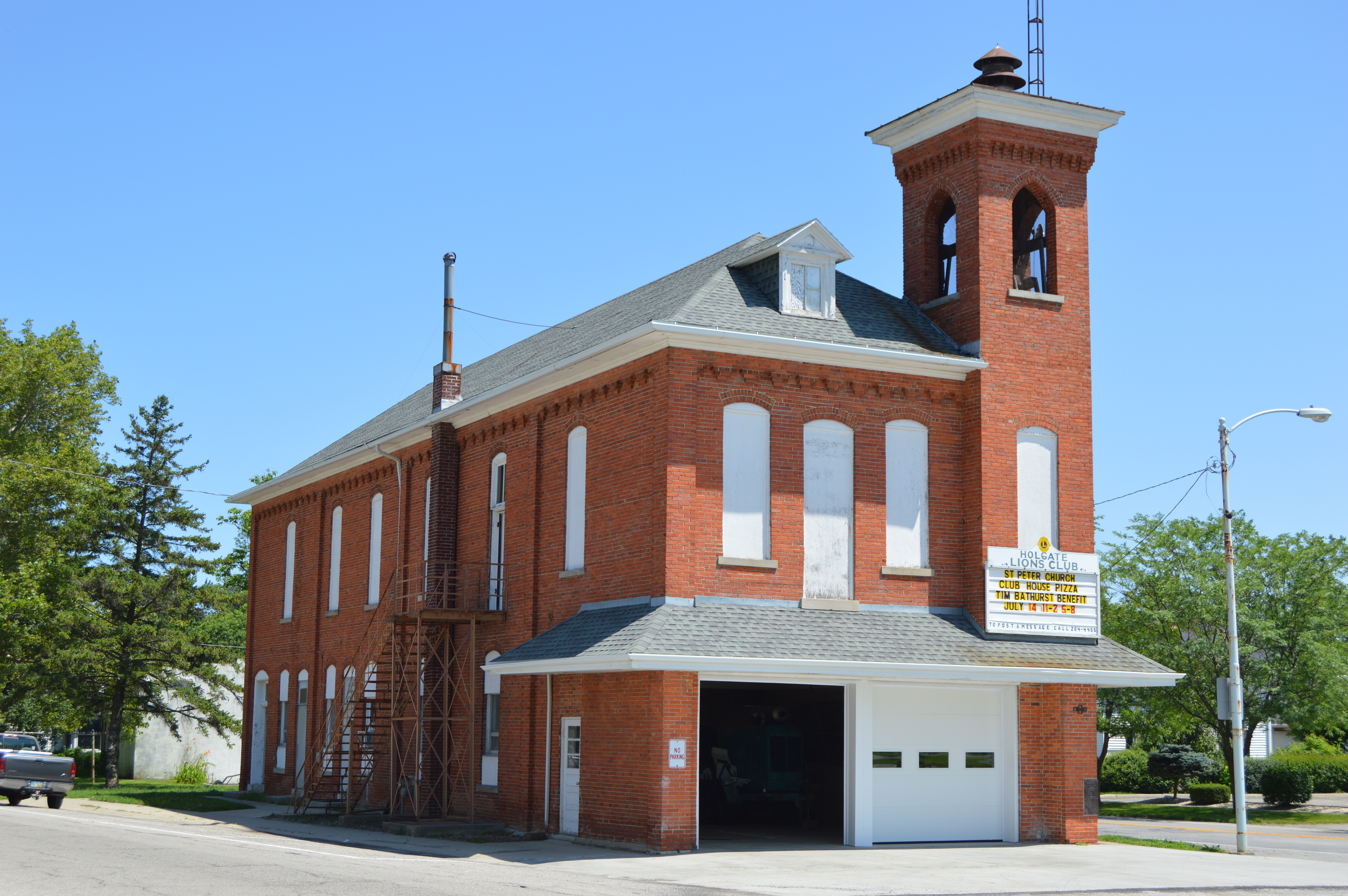
Holgate Village Hall and fire station

=== 2010 census ===
As of the census of 2010, there were 1,109 people, 408 households, and 292 families living in the village. The population density was 964.3 inhabitants per square mile (372.3/km^{2}). There were 460 housing units at an average density of 400.0 per square mile (154.4/km^{2}). The racial makeup of the village was 90.2% White, 0.6% African American, 0.3% Native American, 0.2% Asian, 7.0% from other races, and 1.7% from two or more races. Hispanic or Latino of any race were 19.0% of the population.

There were 408 households, of which 36.8% had children under the age of 18 living with them, 50.7% were married couples living together, 15.2% had a female householder with no husband present, 5.6% had a male householder with no wife present, and 28.4% were non-families. 25.7% of all households were made up of individuals, and 12.3% had someone living alone who was 65 years of age or older. The average household size was 2.61 and the average family size was 3.07.

The median age in the village was 38 years. 27.1% of residents were under the age of 18; 6.7% were between the ages of 18 and 24; 24% were from 25 to 44; 26.6% were from 45 to 64; and 15.6% were 65 years of age or older. The gender makeup of the village was 48.7% male and 51.3% female.

=== 2000 census ===
As of the census of 2000, there were 1,194 people, 441 households, and 310 families living in the village. The population density was 1,218.7 inhabitants per square mile (470.5/km^{2}). There were 464 housing units at an average density of 473.6 per square mile (182.9/km^{2}). The racial makeup of the village was 91.37% White, 0.08% African American, 1.09% Native American, 0.25% Asian, 6.45% from other races, and 0.75% from two or more races. Hispanic or Latino of any race were 18.59% of the population.

There were 441 households, out of which 40.8% had children under the age of 18 living with them, 52.4% were married couples living together, 12.5% had a female householder with no husband present, and 29.5% were non-families. 25.9% of all households were made up of individuals, and 11.6% had someone living alone who was 65 years of age or older. The average household size was 2.62 and the average family size was 3.17.

In the village, the population was spread out, with 29.6% under the age of 18, 8.0% from 18 to 24, 28.5% from 25 to 44, 18.3% from 45 to 64, and 15.6% who were 65 years of age or older. The median age was 35 years. For every 100 females there were 93.5 males. For every 100 females age 18 and over, there were 86.3 males.

The median income for a household in the village was $35,729, and the median income for a family was $45,208. Males had a median income of $35,278 versus $21,618 for females. The per capita income for the village was $16,187. About 7.7% of families and 10.5% of the population were below the poverty line, including 14.7% of those under age 18 and 5.1% of those age 65 or over.

== Education ==
Public education for the village is administered by the Holgate Local School District, which includes Holgate High School.

== Notable people ==
- Joe E. Brown, actor
- Alene Duerk, first female Admiral in US Navy, Holgate High School graduate
- Pete Fahrer, professional baseball player
- Olin Smith, professional football player
