= Malinta, Ohio =

- Village
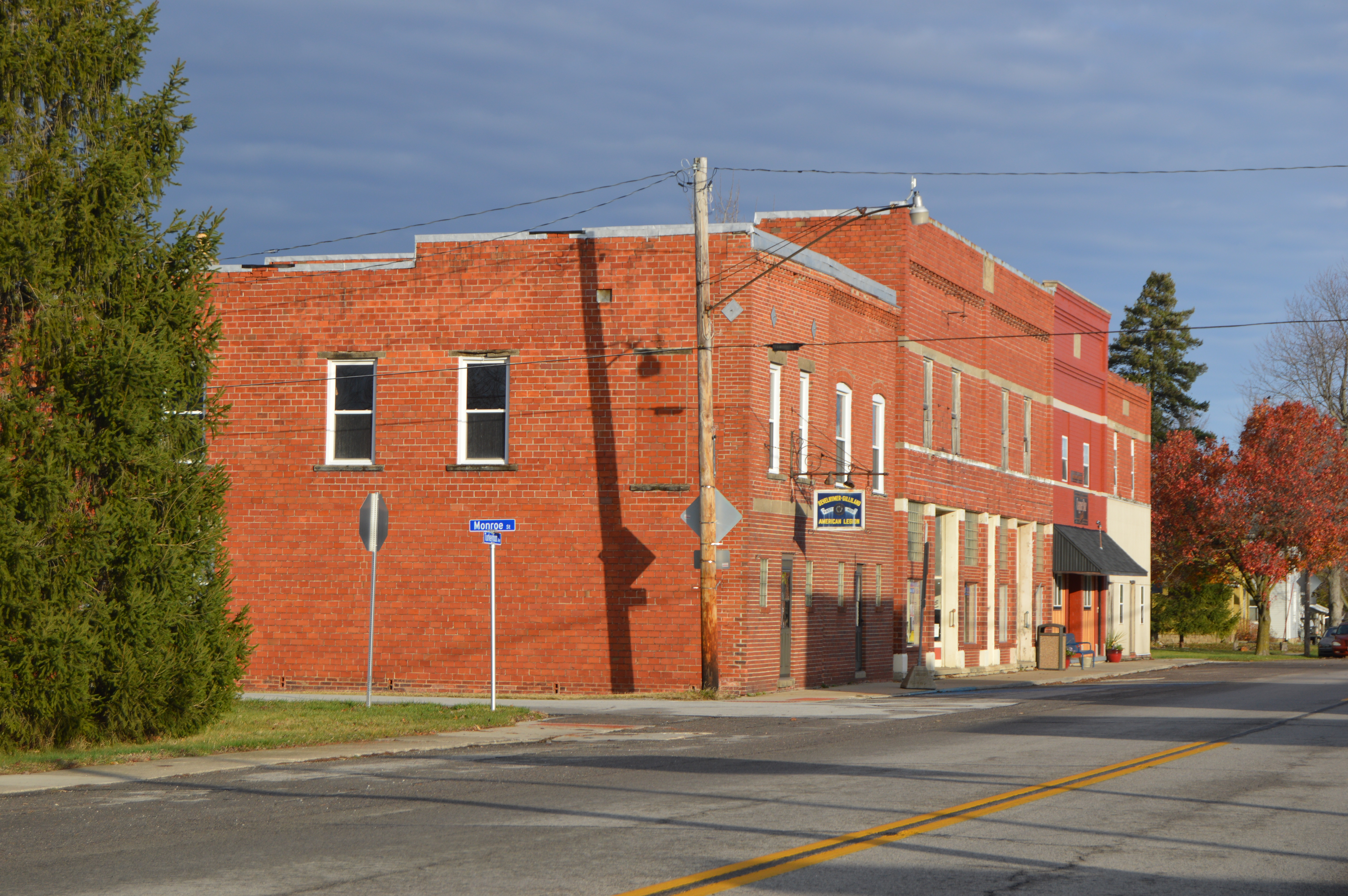
- Turkeyfoot Avenue downtown

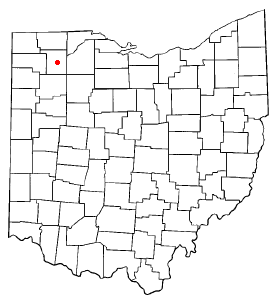
- Location of Malinta, Ohio

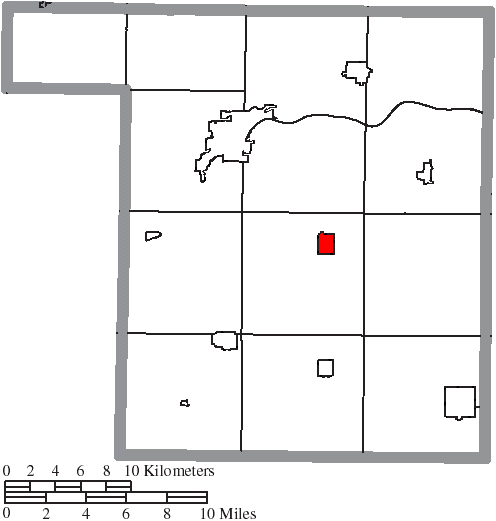
- Location of Malinta in Henry County
- Coordinates: 41°19′11″N 84°02′07″W
- Country: United States
- State: Ohio
- County: Henry

Government
  - Type: Village Council

Area
  - Total: 0.77 sq mi (1.99 km^{2})
  - Land: 0.77 sq mi (1.99 km^{2})
  - Water: 0 sq mi (0.00 km^{2})
- Elevation: 682 ft (208 m)

Population (2020)
  - Total: 236
  - Density: 306.6/sq mi (118.38/km^{2})
- Time zone: UTC-5 (Eastern (EST))
  - Summer (DST): UTC-4 (EDT)
- ZIP code: 43535
- Area code: 419
- FIPS code: 39-46942
- GNIS feature ID: 2399231

Malinta is a village in Henry County, Ohio, United States. The population was 226 at the 2020 census.

== History ==
Malinta was platted in 1880. The village derives its name from Elizabeth Malinta Bensing, the daughter of a first settler. A post office has been in operation at Malinta since 1880.

== Geography ==
According to the United States Census Bureau, the village has a total area of 0.77 square miles (1.99 km^{2}), all land.

== Demographics ==
Historical population
Census	Pop.	Note	%±
1900	357		—
1910	345		−3.4%
1920	348		0.9%
1930	348		0.0%
1940	340		−2.3%
1950	308		−9.4%
1960	339		10.1%
1970	391		15.3%
1980	327		−16.4%
1990	294		−10.1%
2000	285		−3.1%
2010	265		−7.0%
2020	236		−10.9%
U.S. Decennial Census

=== 2010 census ===
As of the census of 2010, there were 265 people, 102 households, and 70 families living in the village. The population density was 344.2 inhabitants per square mile (132.9/km^{2}). There were 116 housing units at an average density of 150.6 per square mile (58.1/km^{2}). The racial makeup of the village was 93.2% White, 0.4% African American, 0.4% Asian, 3.4% from other races, and 2.6% from two or more races. Hispanic or Latino of any race were 14.0% of the population.

There were 102 households, of which 43.1% had children under the age of 18 living with them, 52.0% were married couples living together, 10.8% had a female householder with no husband present, 5.9% had a male householder with no wife present, and 31.4% were non-families. 28.4% of all households were made up of individuals, and 14.7% had someone living alone who was 65 years of age or older. The average household size was 2.60 and the average family size was 3.24.

The median age in the village was 36.2 years. 28.7% of residents were under the age of 18; 6.3% were between the ages of 18 and 24; 26.3% were from 25 to 44; 23.8% were from 45 to 64; and 14.7% were 65 years of age or older. The gender makeup of the village was 47.9% male and 52.1% female.

=== 2000 census ===
As of the census of 2000, there were 285 people, 113 households, and 77 families living in the village. The population density was 369.8 inhabitants per square mile (142.8/km^{2}). There were 119 housing units at an average density of 154.4 per square mile (59.6/km^{2}). The racial makeup of the village was 96.84% White, 0.35% Native American, 0.35% Asian, 1.05% from other races, and 1.40% from two or more races. Hispanic or Latino of any race were 5.96% of the population.

There were 113 households, out of which 34.5% had children under the age of 18 living with them, 54.9% were married couples living together, 7.1% had a female householder with no husband present, and 31.0% were non-families. 25.7% of all households were made up of individuals, and 9.7% had someone living alone who was 65 years of age or older. The average household size was 2.52 and the average family size was 2.99.

In the village, the population was spread out, with 28.8% under the age of 18, 4.6% from 18 to 24, 33.3% from 25 to 44, 16.8% from 45 to 64, and 16.5% who were 65 years of age or older. The median age was 36 years. For every 100 females there were 102.1 males. For every 100 females age 18 and over, there were 97.1 males.

The median income for a household in the village was $37,344, and the median income for a family was $47,679. Males had a median income of $37,188 versus $23,125 for females. The per capita income for the village was $16,087. About 2.5% of families and 2.7% of the population were below the poverty line, including none of those under the age of eighteen or sixty five or over.

== Education ==
Public education for the village is administered by the Patrick Henry Local School District.
