= National Register of Historic Places listings in Henry County, Ohio =

Location of Henry County in Ohio

This is a list of the National Register of Historic Places listings in Henry County, Ohio.

It is intended to be a complete list of the properties on the National Register of Historic Places in Henry County, Ohio, United States. The locations of National Register properties for which the latitude and longitude coordinates are included below, may be seen in a Google map.

There are 4 properties listed on the National Register in the county.

This National Park Service list is complete through NPS recent listings posted March 14, 2025.

== Current listings ==
	Name on the Register	Image	Date listed	Location	City or town	Description
1	First Presbyterian Church	First Presbyterian Church	March 9, 1990 (#90000381)	303 W. Washington; 41°23′23″N 84°07′39″W	Napoleon	American Craftsman church with distinctive sandstone walls
2	Henry County Courthouse	Henry County Courthouse	February 28, 1973 (#73001477)	N. Perry and E. Washington Sts. 41°23′27″N 84°07′28″W	Napoleon	1880s courthouse
3	Henry County Sheriff's Residence and Jail	Henry County Sheriff's Residence and Jail	June 24, 1981 (#81000439)	123 E. Washington St. 41°23′29″N 84°07′25″W	Napoleon	Second Empire former jail and sheriff's house
4	St. Augustine's Catholic Church	St. Augustine's Catholic Church	September 2, 1982 (#82003593)	221 E. Clinton St. at corner of Monroe; 41°23′32″N 84°07′25″W	Napoleon	High Gothic church with a spire reaching 200 feet (61 m) high

== See also ==
- List of National Historic Landmarks in Ohio
- Listings in neighboring counties: Defiance, Fulton, Hancock, Lucas, Putnam, Williams, Wood
- National Register of Historic Places listings in Ohio
