= Harry W. Wachter =

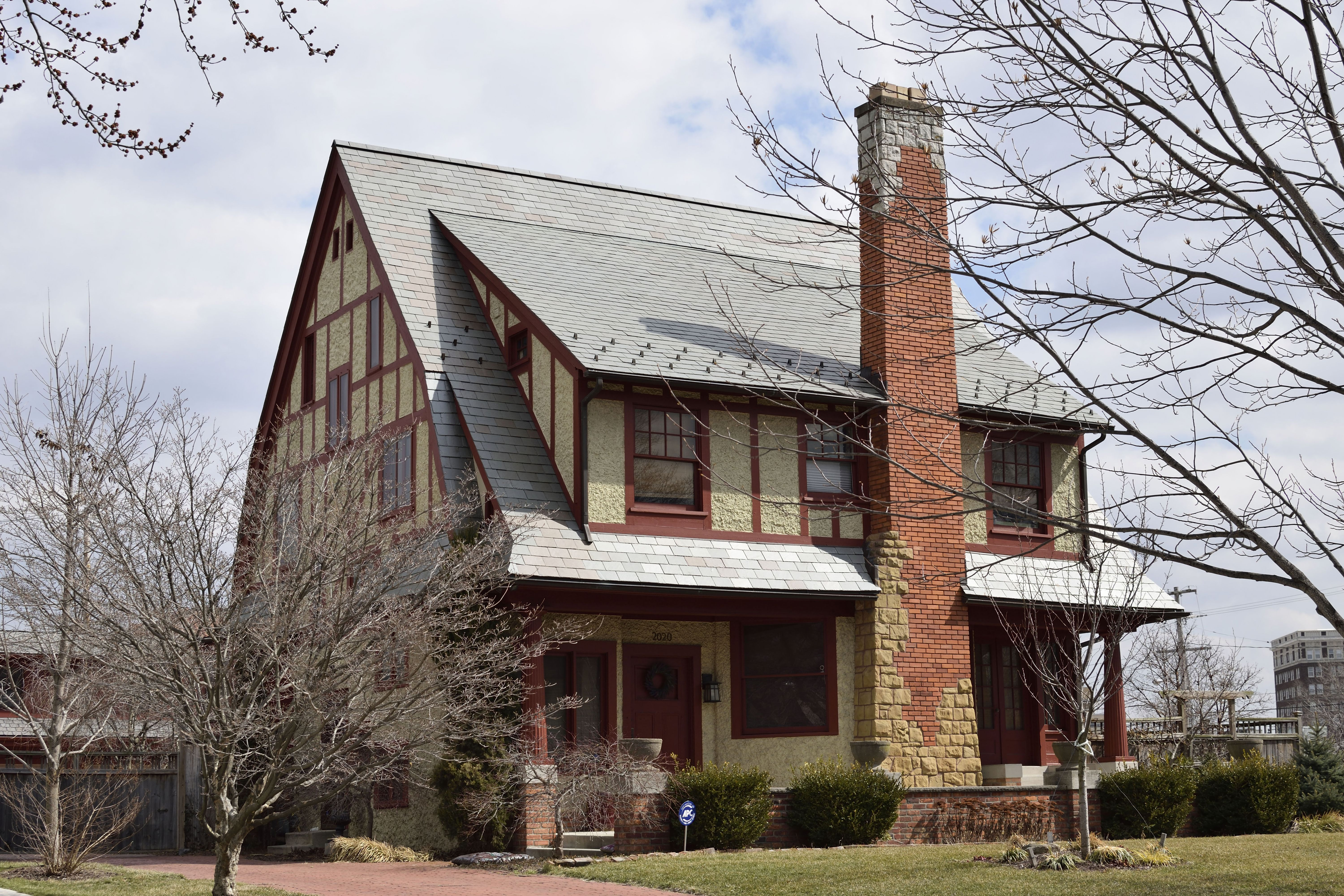
Residence that Harry Wachter designed for himself, seen here in 2019

Harry Wilcox Wachter (December 27, 1868 – April 19, 1941) was an American architect in Toledo, Ohio. He was the local architect involved in the design and construction of the Toledo Museum of Art, working with Edward B. Green's Buffalo, New York firm on the Greek Revival building. Wachter and his firms are also credited with designing several churches including First Presbyterian Church (Napoleon, Ohio) and historic buildings such as Bronson Place.

== Career ==
Wachter attended "old" Toledo High School, Toledo Manual Training School, and Columbia University, where he studied architecture.

He began his professional work at the firm of D.L. Stine. Then he practiced with London born architect George S. Mills from 1892 to 1897. Their work together included Toledo's Dennison Building at 515-517 Dennison Avenue.

Wachter started his own firm in 1898 and partnered with Thomas Hudson to form Wachter & Hudson.

Wachter took a European tour according to a 1904 edition of the Ohio Builder.

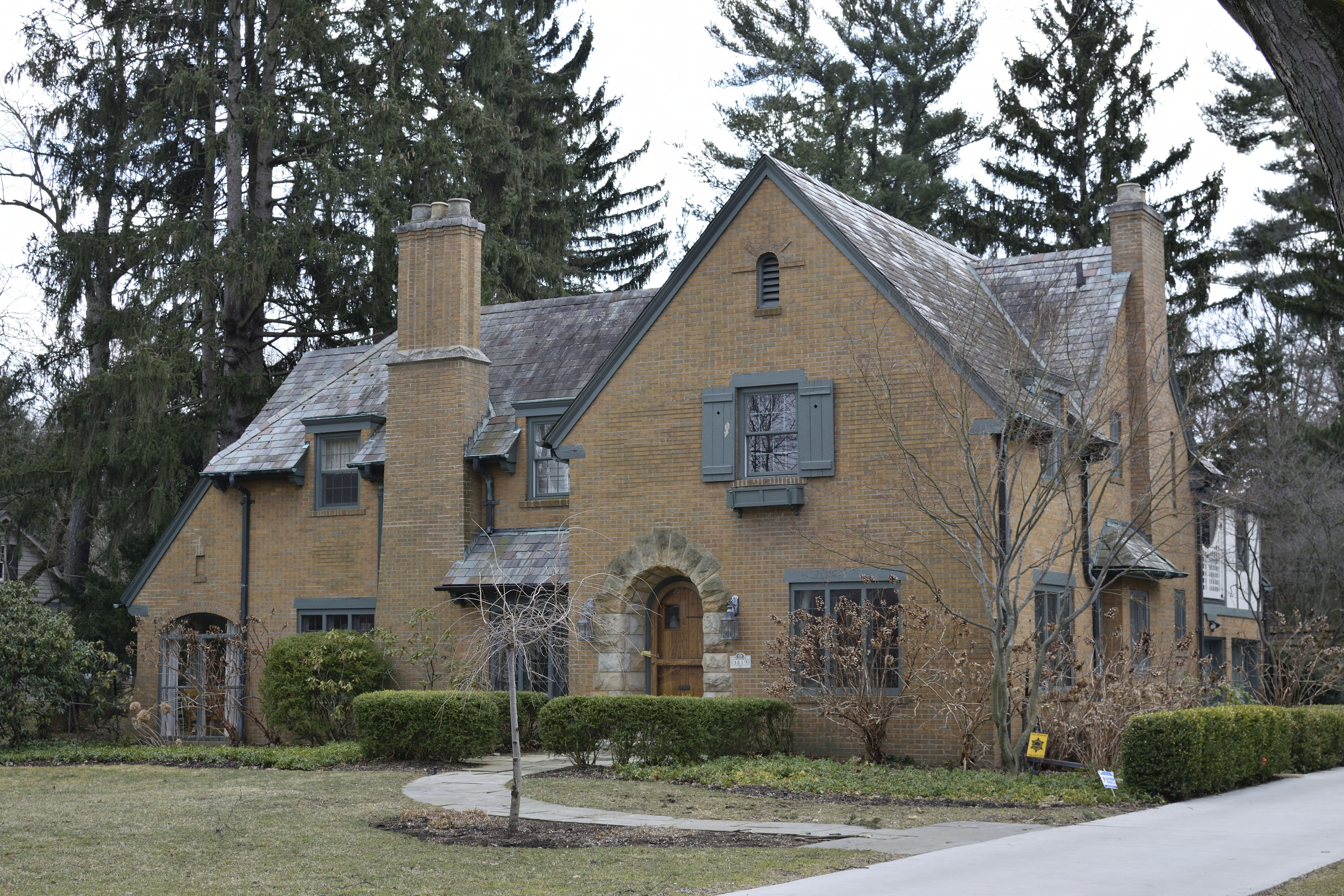
James D. West residence designed by Harry Wachter, seen in 2019

== Achievements ==
He was made a fellow of the American Institute of Architects, was the first president of Toledo's Sylvania Golf Club and one of the founders of Ottawa Park Golf Club, and was a Mason. He died in 1941 after an illness. His son Horace Wachter also practiced architecture.

== Work ==
- William W. Bolles/Joseph Beckler house 2428 Scottwood Avenue (1910)
- Stewart-Hubbard/Gallagher Home at 2244 Scottwood. A "two-story bungalow built in the 1890s by Harry Wachter, architect of many of the homes in the Old West End that have Arts and Crafts features.
- First Presbyterian Church (Napoleon, Ohio) at 303 West Washington in Napoleon, Ohio, 1901
- Washington Congregational Church, Toledo, where Wachter was a member.
- Park Congregational Church, Glendale Avenue, Toledo, 1920
- Pilgrim Congregational Church, Helles and Sylvania Avenues, Toledo, c1920
- Monroe Street Methodist Church, 3613 Monroe Street, Toledo, 1925
- Masonic Temple, Toledo (later demolished)
- YWCA building in Toledo
- Commercial Bank building
- The Wachter Building at 321 and 323 16th St.
- Women's and Children's Hospital
- Brinkerhoff Flats (built 1921 demolished 1973), a building with arched gables, narrow roof dormers, and Gothic design features at 1821 to 1827 Adams Street
- Bronson Place located around Cherry Street, Central and Franklin Avenues in Toledo Ohio. Listed on the National Register of Historic Places.
- Toledo Museum of Art (1912), with Edward B. Green's Green & Wick's firm out of Buffalo, New York. Wachter was the "local architect" for the project.
- Mott House (1925) at 304 State Street, Adrian, Michigan
- Home Telephone Company Building (1902) at 231 Huron Street
- Widell Bath Building at 233 Huron Street, a two-story building where "cleansing notions from Sweden" and "Turkish baths", medical baths and massages were sold.
- Yaryan Power House (1893) at 440 Floyd Street (by Mills & Wachter). Later converted to apartments
- United Presbyterian Church, Jamestown, N.D. (ca. 1910)
