= First Presbyterian Church (Napoleon, Ohio) =

Historic church in Ohio, United States

- U.S. National Register of Historic Places
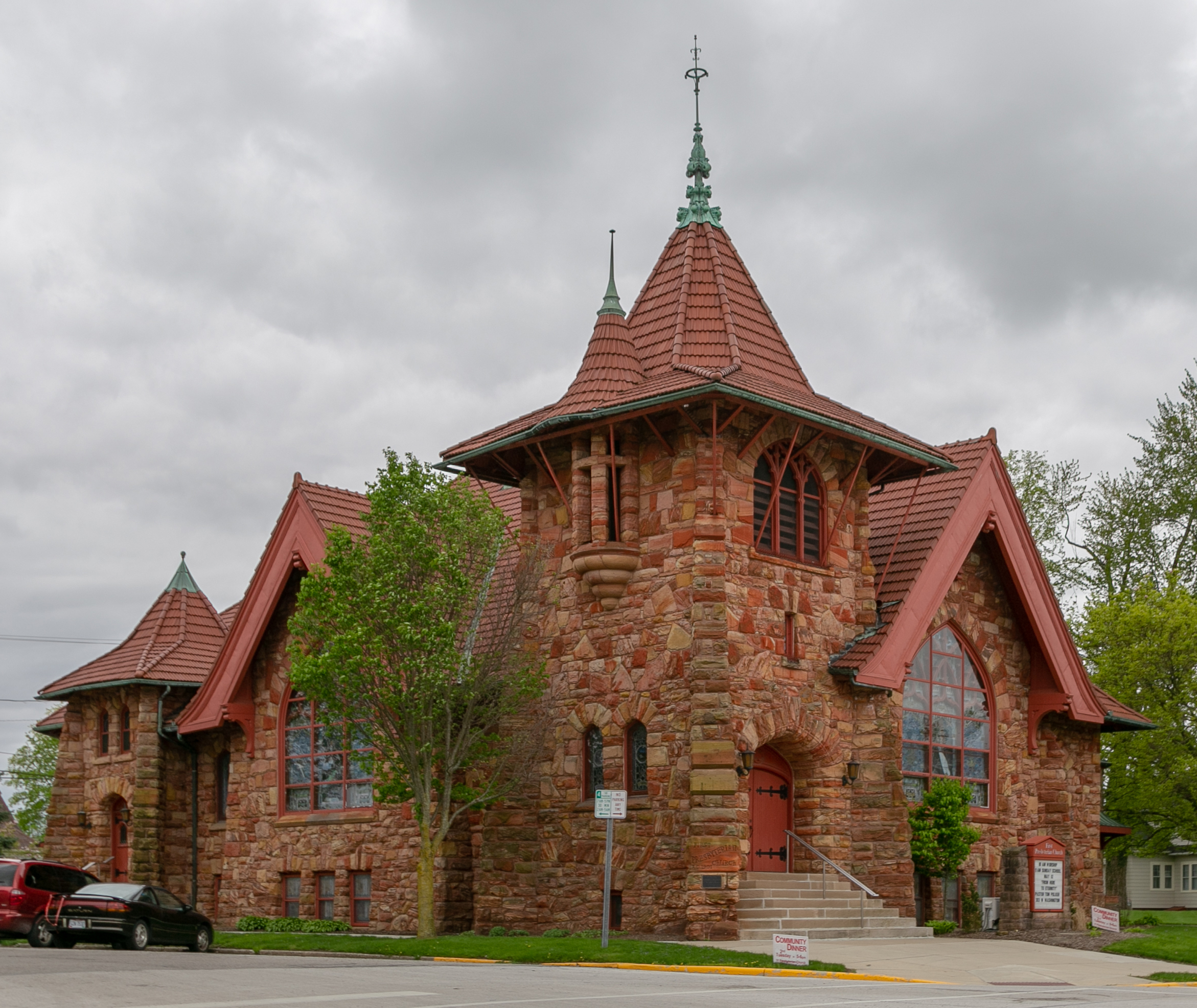
- Front of the church

- Location within Ohio Location within the United States
- Location: 303 W. Washington, Napoleon, Ohio
- Coordinates: 41°23′23″N 84°7′39″W
- Area: less than one acre
- Built: 1901
- Architect: Harry W. Wachter
- Architectural style: American Craftsman
- NRHP reference No.: 90000381
- Added to NRHP: March 9, 1990

First Presbyterian Church is a Presbyterian church in the city of Napoleon, Ohio, United States. Located at 303 W. Washington Street, it has been recognized as a historic site because of its unusual architecture.

== Early history ==
Organized in 1861, the congregation built its first church building on the southwestern corner of the intersection of Washington and Webster Streets, two blocks away from the Henry County Courthouse. Approximately forty years later, the original building was destroyed and the present structure erected on its place; construction began in 1900 and concluded in 1901.

== Architecture ==
Designed by Harry W. Wachter, the church was constructed in the American Craftsman style. Supported by a foundation of sandstone and topped with a terracotta roof, the building features walls of sandstone, taken from quarries near Mansfield, Ohio. Many towers and gables, finished with bargeboards, and break up the plane of its roof; among the most distinctive features of the roof is a small steeple that rises through the main tower, creating an appearance similar to that of a beehive. The interior is lit by multiple large arch windows and a skylight.

Unlike those of many sandstone buildings, the walls of First Presbyterian are built of stones of many different sizes and colors. Combined with the towers and gables of the roofline, the building presents a distinctive appearance; a 1977 survey of historic buildings pronounced the church's architecture unique for northwestern Ohio. Its unusual shapes and colors present a significant contrast to St. Augustine's Catholic Church, located on the other side of downtown Napoleon: while First Presbyterian includes a broken roofline and the many decorative elements typical of the American Craftsman style, St. Augustine's is a uniform Gothic Revival structure with a tower 200 feet (61 m) high. First Presbyterian's architecture has led to wider recognition for the church; in 1980, it was placed on the National Register of Historic Places because of its architectural significance. Only three other buildings in Henry County, all of which are in downtown Napoleon, are listed on the Register; no Ohio county has fewer properties on the Register than does Henry County.

== Congregation ==
First Presbyterian Church is an active part of the Maumee Valley Presbytery of the Presbyterian Church (U.S.A.). When the presbytery last compiled statistics, the congregation reported 133 members; at that time, it was served by Pastor Gavin Pitt. The congregation has also owned a parsonage; located at 304 W. Main Street, near the church building, it is a brick Victorian house built before the first church building was destroyed.
