= St. Augustine's Catholic Church (Napoleon, Ohio) =

Historic church in Ohio, United States

- U.S. National Register of Historic Places
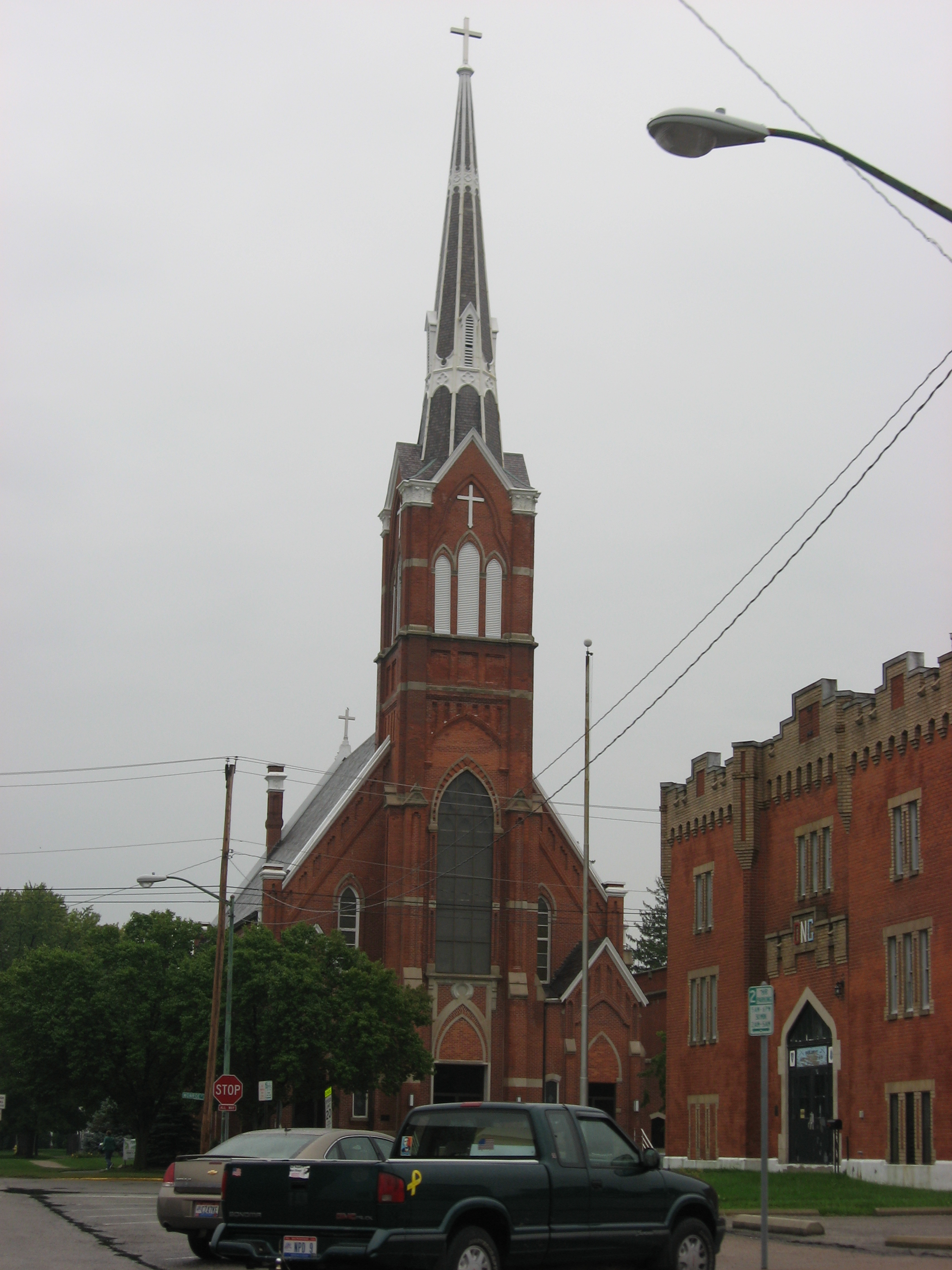
- Front of St. Augustine's Church

- Location within Ohio Location within the United States
- Location: 210 E. Clinton St. at corner of Monroe and Clinton Streets, Napoleon, Ohio
- Coordinates: 41°23′34″N 84°7′25″W
- Area: 1 acre (0.40 ha)
- Built: 1881
- Architect: Otto Honek; Alex Young
- Architectural style: Gothic Revival, High Victorian Gothic
- NRHP reference No.: 82003593
- Added to NRHP: September 2, 1982

St. Augustine's Catholic Church is a historic church in Napoleon, Ohio, United States. Located on the edge of the city's downtown, two blocks away from the Henry County Courthouse, the church is a prominent landmark in Napoleon.

== History ==
St. Augustine Parish was founded at some point between 1856 and 1858; its first priest was Michael Pietz. The parish was dedicated to St. Augustine in honor of Augustine Pilliod, who supervised the construction of its first building. This structure was replaced with the current church, which was built at a cost of $21,893. Although construction was largely completed in 1881, the altars were not installed until 1888.

== Architecture ==
St. Augustine's Church has been rated a fine example of Gothic Revival architecture: both its exterior and its interior feature many examples of the style. A high ceiling, supported by many Gothic arches, rises above the sanctuary and its elaborate wooden altar and pews. Stained glass windows on the front, rear, and sides of the church provide light to the interior. The building's exterior, topped with a steeple that rises 200 feet (61 m) above the ground, is built of brick trimmed with stone. The entire structure rests on a stone foundation; at the time of construction, small windows lit the basement, but these windows have since been closed with concrete blocks. Other small alterations have been made to the building over the years, including the replacement of the original front doors and wooden steps and the removal of crosses on the building's corners.

Three buildings associated with the church are located nearby. A two-story brick rectory, bought by the parish in 1925, sits behind the church, while a Catholic school lies next door. Across Clinton Street from the church is located a convent of the Sisters of Notre Dame, a two-story Italianate building constructed in 1862.

The tall brick Gothic tower of St. Augustine's Church places its architecture in stark contrast to another historic church on the edge of downtown Napoleon. First Presbyterian Church, located on Washington Street four blocks southwest of St. Augustine's, features an American Gothic exterior built of multicolored sandstone.

== Recent history ==
In 1982, the church was added to the National Register of Historic Places for its architectural significance. It is one of four buildings in Henry County that are listed on the Register; the others are the county courthouse, the sheriff's house and jail, and First Presbyterian Church. It remains an active parish of the Diocese of Toledo and its Our Lady Queen of Peace Deanery.
