= Henry County Courthouse =

Henry County Courthouse may refer to:

- Henry County Courthouse (Georgia), McDonough, Georgia
- Henry County Courthouse (Iowa), Mount Pleasant, Iowa
- Henry County Courthouse (Illinois), Cambridge, Illinois
- Henry County Courthouse (Indiana), New Castle, Indiana
- Henry County Courthouse, Jail, and Warden's House, New Castle, Kentucky
- Henry County Courthouse (Ohio), Napoleon, Ohio
- Henry County Courthouse (Tennessee), Paris, Tennessee
