= Henry County Sheriff's Residence and Jail =

Historic government building in Ohio, United States

- U.S. National Register of Historic Places
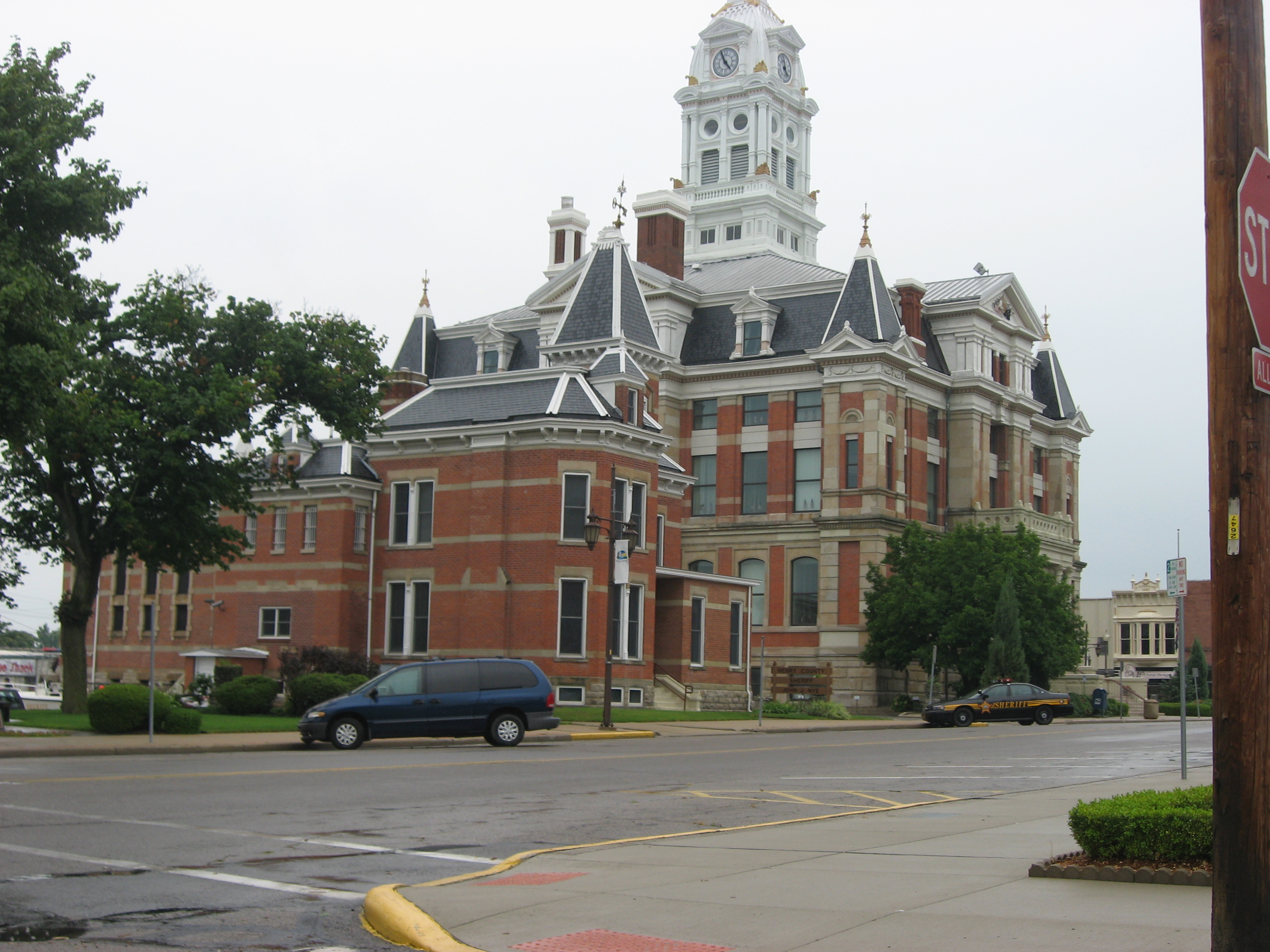
- Side of the building, with the county courthouse behind

- Location within Ohio Location within the United States
- Location: 123 E. Washington St., Napoleon, Ohio
- Coordinates: 41°23′29″N 84°7′25″W
- Area: 1 acre (0.40 ha)
- Built: 1882
- Architect: D.W. Gibbs
- Architectural style: Second Empire, Gothic Revival
- NRHP reference No.: 81000439
- Added to NRHP: June 24, 1981

The Henry County Sheriff's Residence and Jail is a government building in Napoleon, Ohio, United States. Built in 1882 to a design by architect D.W. Gibbs, the residence-and-jail is located adjacent to the Henry County Courthouse in the city's downtown.

== Structure ==
On November 9, 1879, a fire destroyed the previous Henry County Courthouse. Within three months, the county had secured the approval of the Ohio General Assembly to issue bonds to pay for the construction of a new courthouse, sheriff's house, and jail. The jail side of the resulting brick building, designed to be fireproof, was built to separate male prisoners from female prisoners and young inmates from elderly inmates. Its twelve iron cells are connected by sixty feet of concrete-floored corridors. A report prepared by a state humanitarian board in 1913 observed that the building was equipped with electricity and hot and cold running water; maintenance of the jail and provision of food for its inmates was the responsibility of the sheriff. Some prisoners in Henry County were housed separately: many smaller jails, ranging in capacity from one cell to four cells, were maintained by the villages of the county.

== End of the jail ==
Into the 1980s, the sheriff's house and jail retained a great degree of integrity; it was listed on the National Register of Historic Places on June 24, 1981, in recognition of its architectural significance. The late 1980s saw a conversion in the building's purpose: by this time, increasing crime rates had led to overcrowding at many jails in northwestern Ohio. In early 1989, officials from five northwestern Ohio counties and the city of Toledo agreed to create a single regional jail complex. Because Henry County was part of this consortium, the 1882 building ceased to be used for detention purposes; instead, it was converted into offices for the sheriff's department, a call center for the county's 9-1-1 system, and office space for other county agencies. Today, the jail remains the location of the sheriff's office.
