= Josephine R. Hilgard =

Psychologist

Josephine Rohrs Hilgard
- Rohrs (later Hilgard), from the 1928 yearbook of Smith College
- Born: Josephine Rohrs; March 12, 1906; Napoleon, Ohio
- Died: May 16, 1989 (aged 83); Palo Alto, California
- Occupations: Researcher; Psychiatrist; Psychoanalyst
- Spouse: Ernest Hilgard
- Children: 2

Academic background
- Education: Smith College; Yale University; Stanford University School of Medicine

Academic work
- Discipline: Psychology; Psychiatry
- Institutions: Stanford University School of Medicine
- Main interests: Psychoanalysis; Hypnosis

Josephine Rohrs Hilgard (March 12, 1906 – May 16, 1989) was an American developmental psychologist, psychiatrist, and psychoanalyst. She was a clinical professor in the Department of Psychiatry at Stanford Medical School. She conducted research on mental health and developed the theory of "anniversary reactions", which described how psychiatric issues might be triggered at anniversaries of significant events in a patient's life. She also specialized in hypnotherapy, and published research on the theory and practice of hypnosis.

== Biography ==
Josephine "Josie" Rohrs was born and raised in the community of Napoleon, Ohio. She graduated from Smith College in 1928, and earned her PhD in child psychology from Yale University in 1933. She married Ernest Hilgard, a fellow psychologist whom she had met at Yale, in 1931. They had a son, Henry, in 1936, and a daughter, Elizabeth Ann, in 1944.

Hilgard earned an M.D. from Stanford Medical School in 1940. She completed psychoanalytic training at the Chicago Psychoanalytic Institute in Washington, D.C., and at the Washington-Baltimore Psychoanalytic Institute.

Hilgard held various clinical positions across the country over the subsequent years: she was a Rockefeller Fellow at the Institute for Juvenile Research in Chicago, where she worked with Franz Alexander; she treated adolescents with mental health issues at Chestnut Lodge in Maryland, under the supervision of Frieda Fromm-Reichman and Harry Stack Sullivan; and later she would become director of the Child Guidance Clinic at a children's hospital in San Francisco. Finally, she accepted a position as clinical professor in the Department of Psychiatry at Stanford Medical School. She conducted clinical work throughout her career as a psychiatrist and later as a psychoanalyst, and had a therapy office attached to her home.

Hilgard died in 1989 in Palo Alto, California.

== Research ==
One of Hilgard's contributions was her work on the "anniversary reaction," which described the finding that psychotic or neurotic episodes often occurred at the anniversaries of significant life events; for example, when a patient reached the age at which one of their parents had died, or when a child of the patient reached the age the patient had been, when one of their parents had died. Hilgard reviewed this early work in her last peer-reviewed journal article.

Hilgard investigated undergraduate students' experiences of hypnosis at Stanford's Laboratory of Hypnosis. She published her findings in 1970 in her book, Personality and Hypnosis: A Study of Imaginative Involvement. She found that there was a relationship between individuals' absorption in hypnotic experiences and their history of imaginative involvement as children. She also discovered that children's experiences of physical punishment may predict the development of high hypnotic ability.

Hilgard also conducted research on the use of hypnosis to manage pain. She wrote two books on hypnotic analgesia: Hypnosis in the Relief of Pain (1975; co-authored with her husband), and The Hypnotherapy of Pain in Children with Cancer (1984; co-authored with Samuel LeBaron). She co-authored the Stanford Hypnotic Clinical Scale for Children.

In 1982, the Society for Clinical and Experimental Hypnosis presented Hilgard with the Bernard B. Raginsky Award for being a "distinguished teacher, researcher and pioneer in the field of hypnosis." In 1985, the International Society of Hypnosis awarded her the Benjamin Franklin Gold Medal for Excellence, for being a "distinguished clinician and scientist whose insightful research serves as a model for the integration of clinical sensitivity and scientific rigor."

== Selected works ==
=== Books ===
- Hilgard, Ernest R.; Hilgard, Josephine Rohrs (1975). Hypnosis in the relief of pain (Rev. ed.). New York: Brunner/Mazel. ISBN 0-87630-700-4. OCLC 29597887.
- Hilgard, Josephine R. (1979). Personality and hypnosis : a study of imaginative involvement (2d ed.). Chicago: University of Chicago Press. ISBN 0-226-33443-0. OCLC 4956839.
- Hilgard, Josephine R. (1984). Hypnotherapy of Pain in Children with Cancer. LeBaron, Samuel. Florence: Routledge. ISBN 978-1-317-84086-2. OCLC 1104084763.

=== Articles ===
- Hilgard, Josephine R. (1932). "Learning and maturation in preschool children". Pedagogical Seminary and Journal of Genetic Psychology. 41: 36–56.
- Hilgard, Josephine R. (1953). "Anniversary Reactions in Parents Precipitated by Children". Psychiatry. 16 (1): 73–80. doi:10.1080/00332747.1953.11022910. ISSN 0033-2747. PMID 13037920.
- Hilgard, Josephine Rohrs; Newman, Martha F. (1959). "Anniversaries in Mental Illness". Psychiatry. 22 (2): 113–121. doi:10.1080/00332747.1959.11023165. ISSN 0033-2747. PMID 13658280.
- Hilgard, Josephine R.; Newman, Martha F.; Fisk, Fern (1960). "Strength of adult ego following childhood bereavement". American Journal of Orthopsychiatry. 30 (4): 788–798. doi:10.1111/j.1939-0025.1960.tb02094.x. ISSN 1939-0025. PMID 13714235.
- Morgan, Arlene H.; Hilgard, Josephine R. (1978). "The Stanford Hypnotic Clinical Scale for Children". American Journal of Clinical Hypnosis. 21 (2–3): 148–169. doi:10.1080/00029157.1978.10403969. ISSN 0002-9157. PMID 747163.
- Hilgard, Josephine R. (1974). "Imaginative involvement: Some characteristics of the highly hypnotizable and the non-hypnotizable". International Journal of Clinical and Experimental Hypnosis. 22 (2): 138–156. doi:10.1080/00207147408412993. ISSN 0020-7144. PMID 4421282.
- Hilgard, Josephine R.; LeBaron, Samuel (1982). "Relief of anxiety and pain in children and adolescents with cancer: Quantitative measures and clinical observations". International Journal of Clinical and Experimental Hypnosis. 30 (4): 417–442. doi:10.1080/00207148208407277. ISSN 0020-7144. PMID 6957402.
