= Toledo Museum of Art =

Art museum in Toledo, Ohio

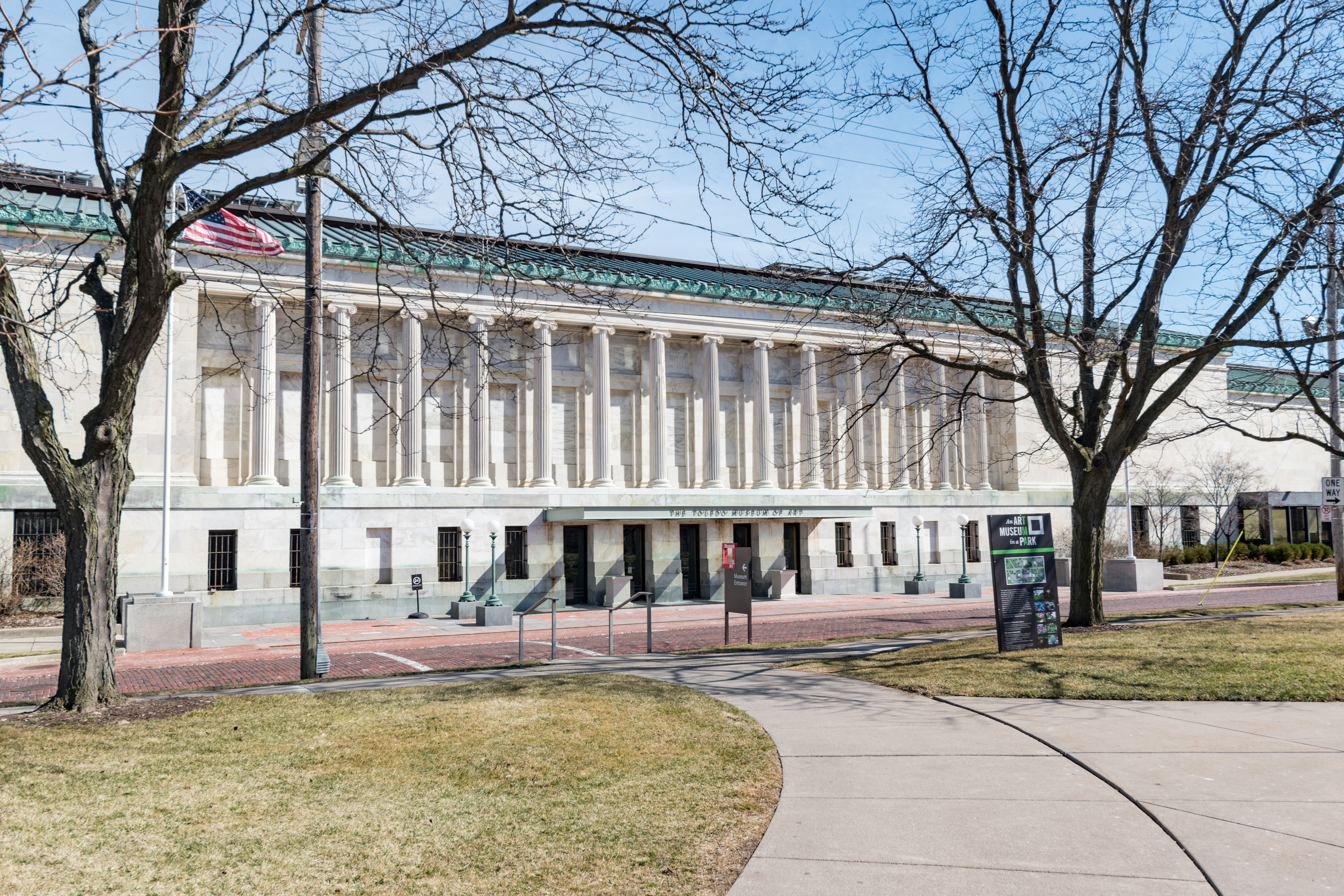
- Interactive fullscreen map
- Established: 1901
- Location: 2445 Monroe Street; Toledo, Ohio
- Coordinates: 41°39′30″N 83°33′34″W
- Accreditation: American Alliance of Museums
- Visitors: 383,685 (2019)
- Director: Adam M. Levine
- Public transit access: TARTA
- Website: toledomuseum.org
- Toledo Museum of Art
- U.S. Historic district – Contributing property
- Built: 1912
- Architect: Edward B. Green and Harry W. Wachter
- Architectural style: Greek Revival
- Part of: Old West End District (ID73001503)
- Designated CP: March 14, 1973

The Toledo Museum of Art is an art museum located in the Old West End neighborhood of Toledo, Ohio. It houses a collection of more than 30,000 objects. With 45 galleries, it covers 280,000 square feet (26,000 m^{2}). The museum was founded by Toledo glassmaker Edward Drummond Libbey in 1901, and moved to its current location, a Greek Revival building designed by Edward B. Green and Harry W. Wachter, in 1912.

The main building was expanded twice, in the 1920s and 1930s. Other buildings were added in the 1990s and 2006. The museum's main building consists of 4 1/2 acres (18,000 m^{2}) of floor space on two levels. Features include fifteen classroom studios, a 1,750-seat Peristyle concert hall, a 176-seat lecture hall, a café and gift shop.

The museum averages some 380,000 visitors per year. In 2025 and 2026, it was voted the best art museum in the country by the readers and editors of USA Today, one of the biggest US newspapers by number of subscribers and print circulation.

The Toledo Museum of Art's eleventh and current director is Adam M. Levine.

== Collection ==
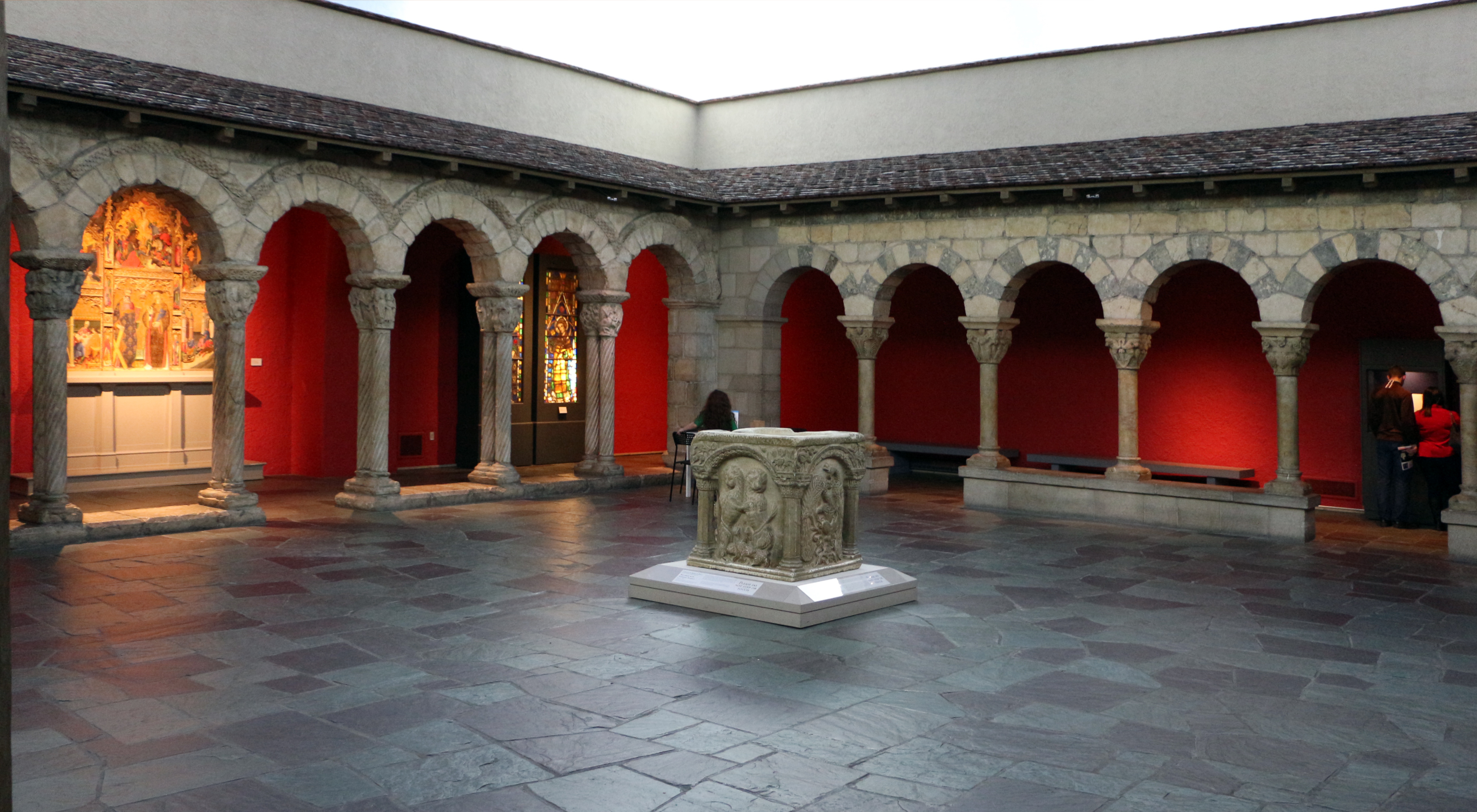
The Medieval Cloister

The museum holds major collections of glass art and of 19th- and 20th-century European and American art, as well as small but distinguished collections of Renaissance, Greek, Roman and Japanese art. Notable individual works include Peter Paul Rubens's The Crowning of Saint Catherine; Fragonard's Blind Man's Bluff; Vincent van Gogh's Houses at Auvers; minor works by Rembrandt and El Greco; and modern works by Willem de Kooning, Henry Moore, and Sol LeWitt. Other artists in the permanent collection include Holbein, Cole, Cropsey, Turner, Tissot, Degas, Monet, Cézanne, Matisse, Miró, Picasso, Calder, Bearden, Close, and Kiefer.

== Peristyle ==
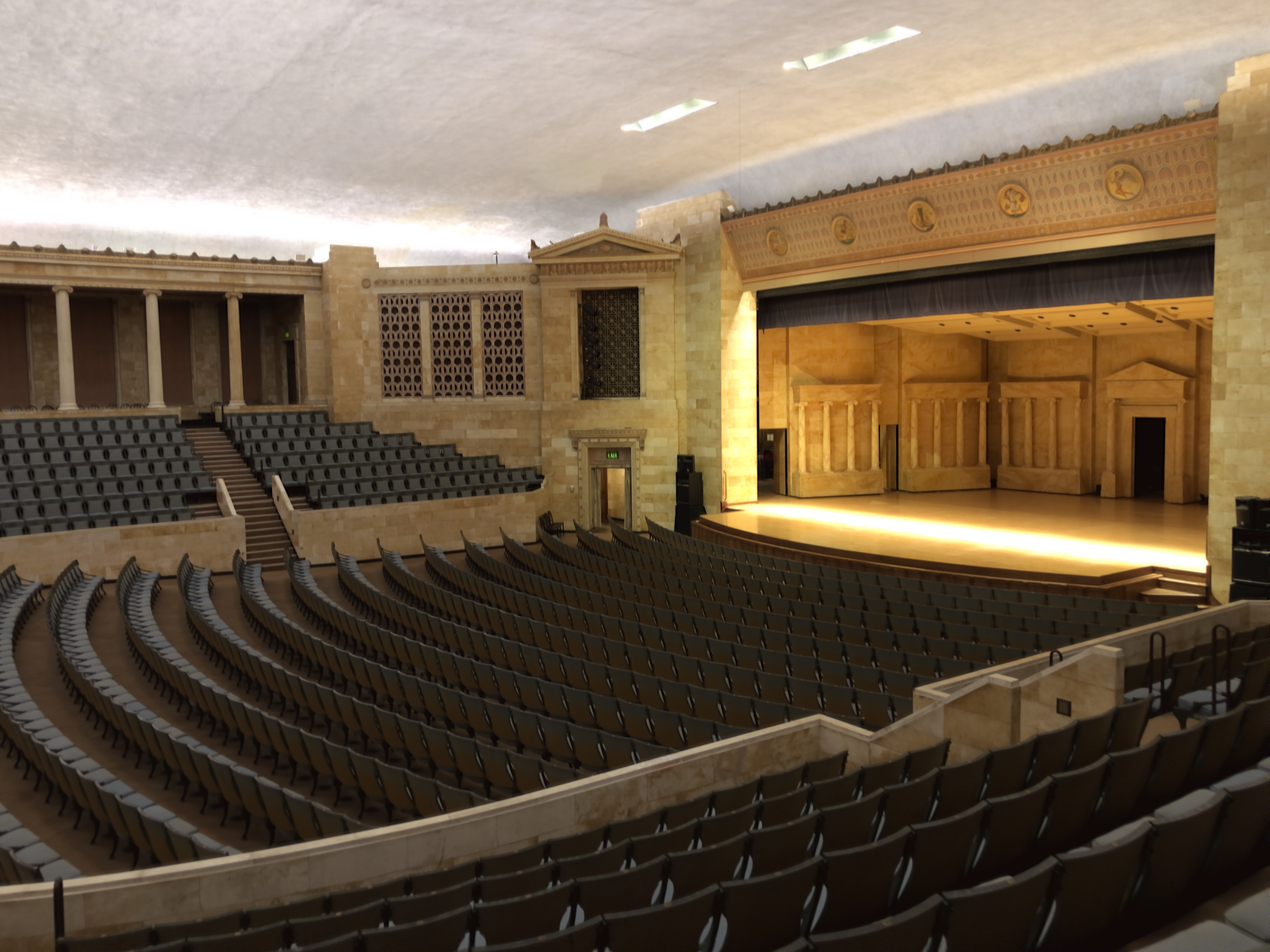
The Peristyle

The Peristyle, a 1,750-seat concert hall in the east wing, is the principal concert space for the Toledo Symphony Orchestra and hosts the museum's Masters series. Added in 1933, it was designed in classical style to match the museum's exterior. Seating is divided into floor and riser seating, with the riser seating arranged in a half-circle, similar to a Greek theater. At the back of the riser seating are 28 Ionic columns that give the concert hall its name.

A sculpture garden containing primarily postwar works was added in 2001; it runs in a narrow band along the museum's Monroe Street facade. (Earlier sculptures are on display in the interior).

== Center for the Visual Arts and the Glass Pavilion ==
A Center for the Visual Arts, designed by Frank Gehry, was added in the 1990s. It includes the museum's library as well as studio, office, and classroom space for the art department of the University of Toledo.

In 2000, the museum chose the architectural firm of SANAA to design a new building to house the institution's glass collection. It was the firm's first commission in the United States. Front Inc. was appointed to assist the architects in developing technical concepts for the glass wall systems. Much of the $30 million Glass Pavilion's financing came through the largest public fundraising drive in Toledo's history. The building's curved glass walls were imported from China.

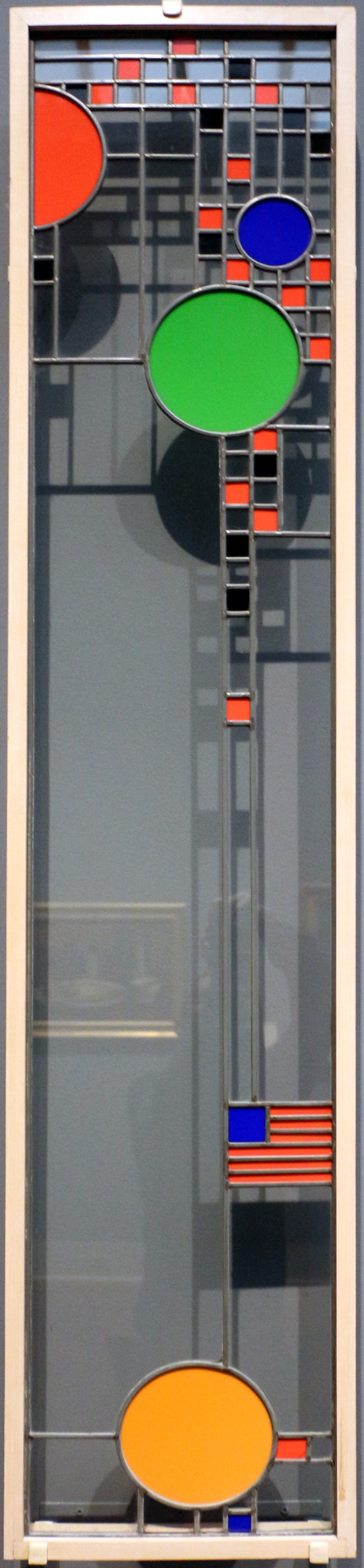
Window by Frank Lloyd Wright, 1912

The 74,000-square foot Glass Pavilion opened in August 2006 to considerable critical acclaim. ArtNet described it as "a striking symbol of cultural power. Intended to give pride of place to the institution's collection of art glass." In his review for The New York Times, Nicolai Ouroussoff wrote, "Composed with exquisite delicacy, the pavilion's elegant maze of curved glass walls represents the latest monument to evolve in a chain extending back to the Hall of Mirrors at Versailles." Ouroussoff commented on the pavilion's relationship with the museum's other buildings: "The Glass Pavilion is part of a loosely knit complex that includes the Beaux-Arts-style art museum here and the University of Toledo's Center for the Visual Arts, designed by Frank Gehry. With its grand staircase leading up to a row of Ionic columns, the original museum is both a temple to art and a monument to the belief in high culture's ability to uplift the life of the worker. The new structure's low, horizontal form, fits in this context with remarkable delicacy, as if the architects hesitated to disturb the surroundings." The Pavilion is host to 700 public glass blowing exhibitions per year, as well as community events such as (Re)New Year's Days, inspired by art, yoga, movement, and meditation, and Art of the Cut, a celebration of Black barbers and their roles as artists and men's wellness advocates that was sponsored by ProMedica.

The building showcases the museum's original glass collection and several new works, including one prominent glass sculpture by Dale Chihuly.

== Notable pieces ==
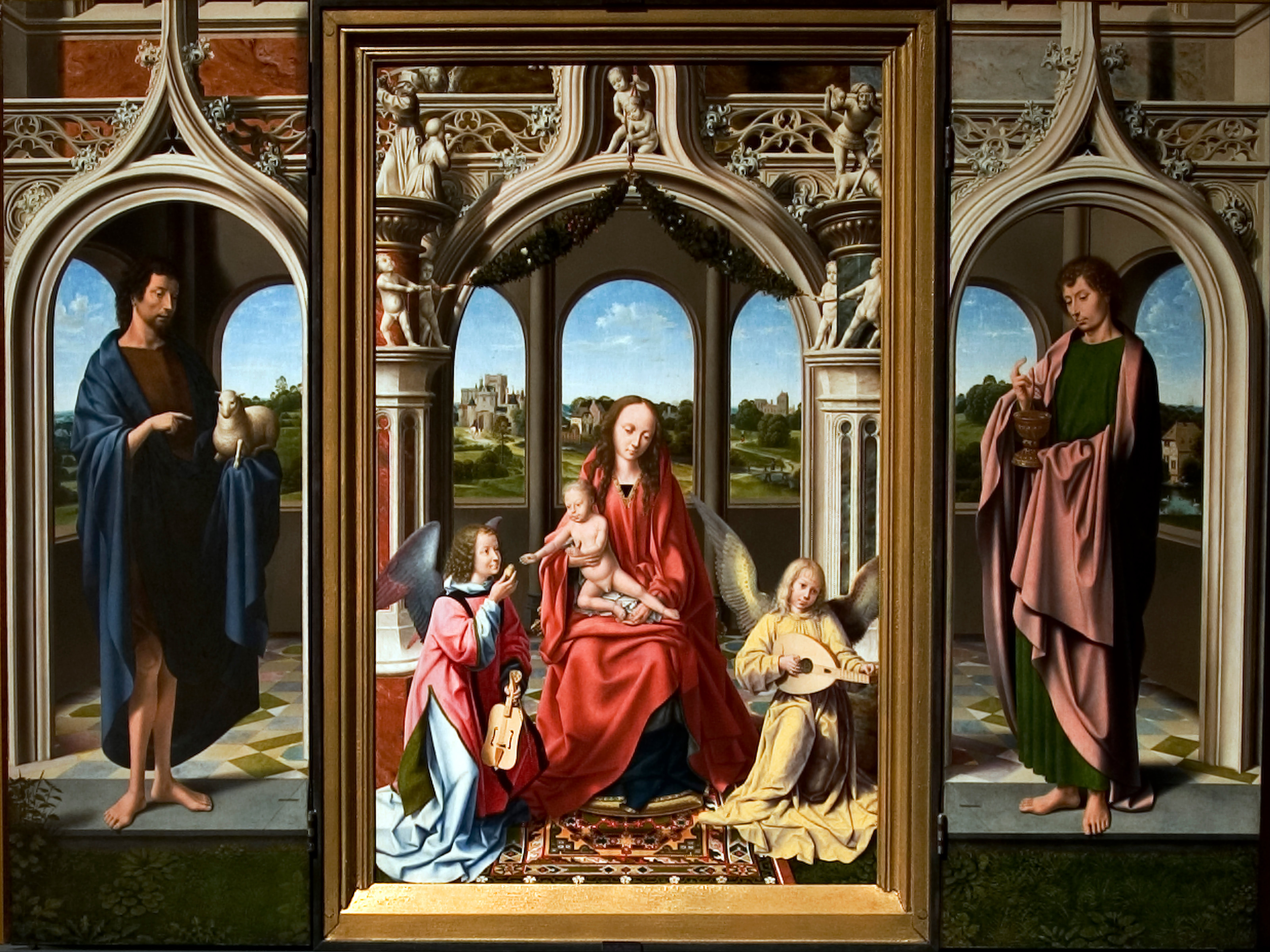
Master of the Morrison Triptych, c. 1500-1510

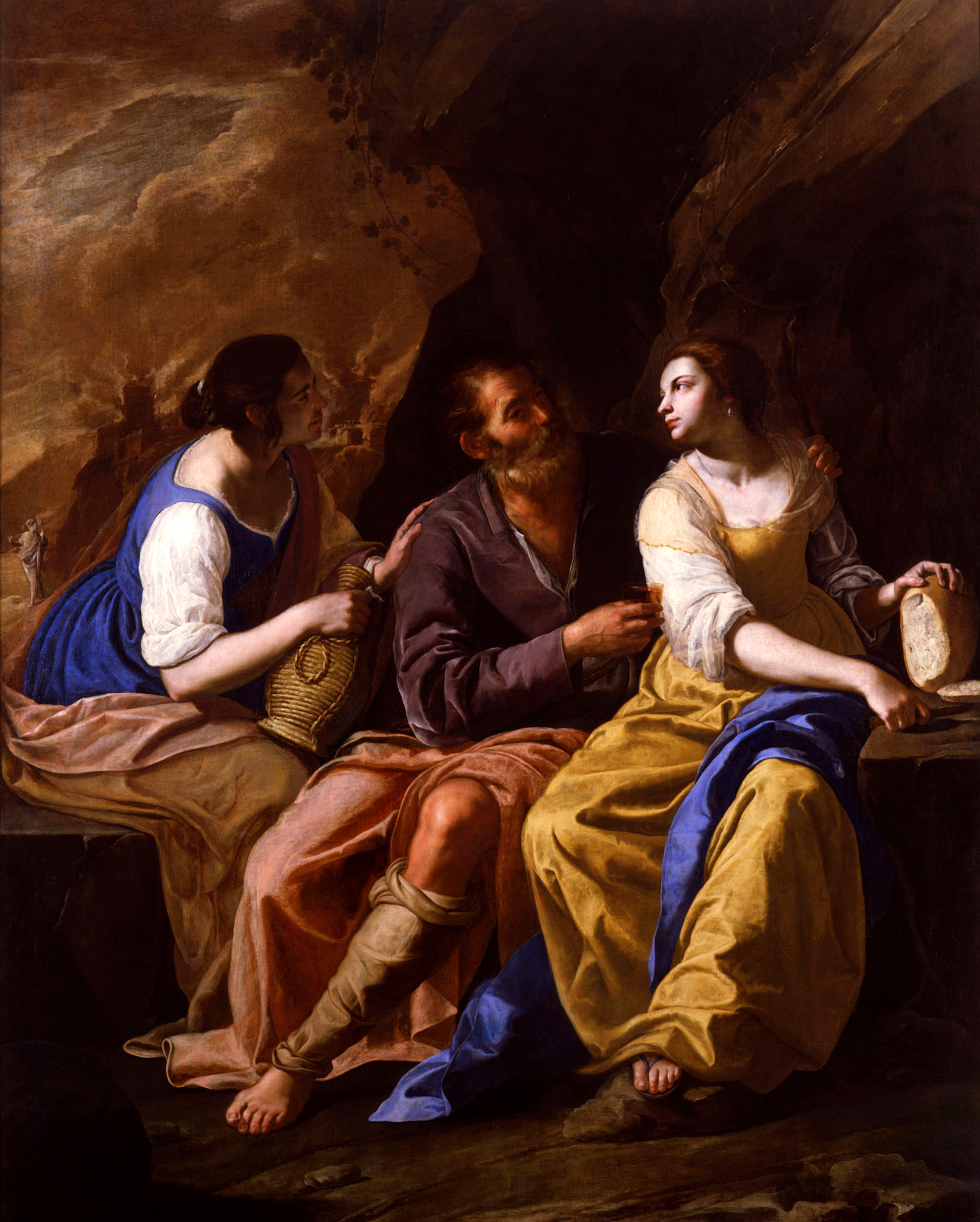
Lot and His Daughters by Artemisia Gentileschi, 1635-1638

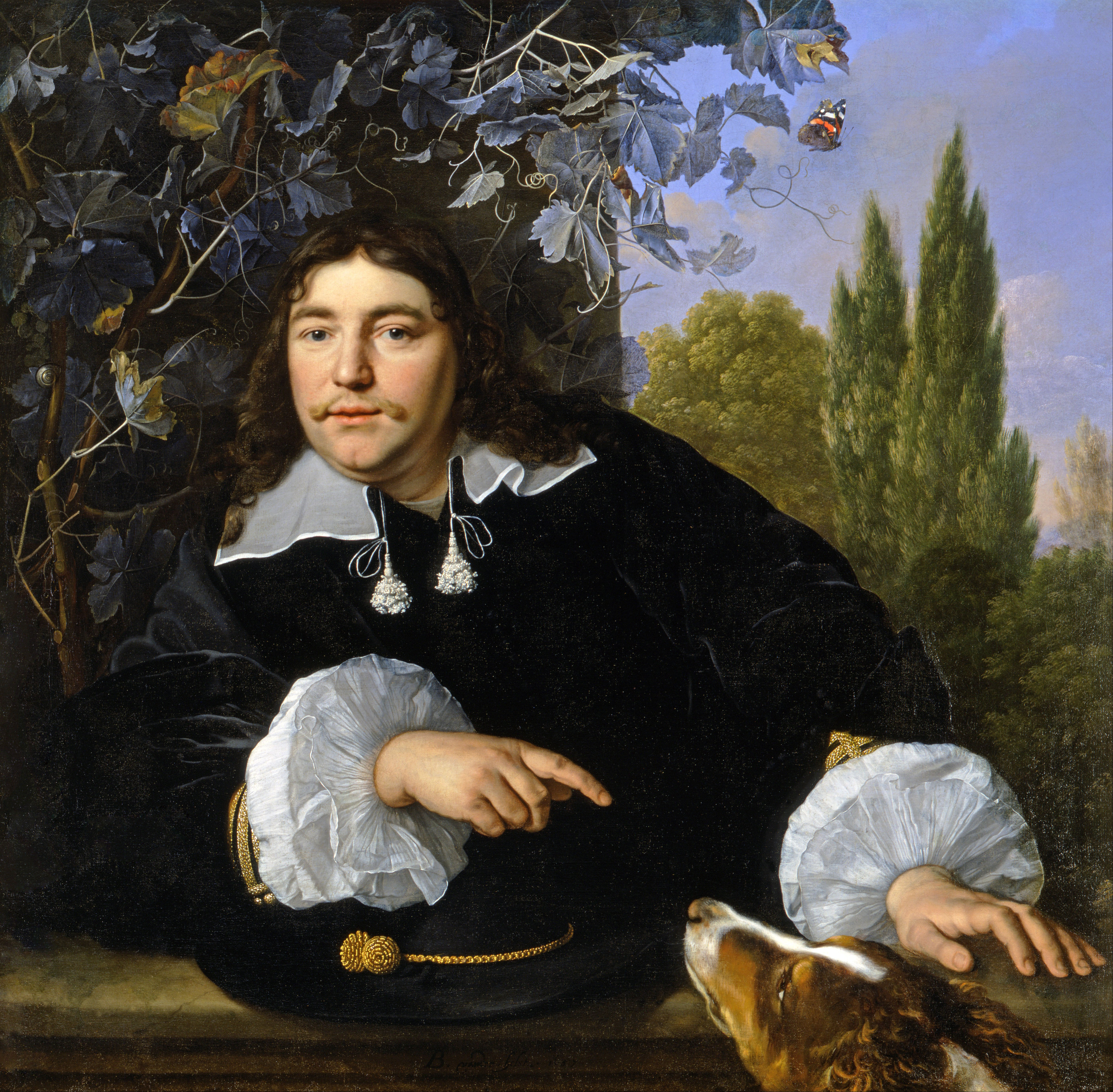
Self-Portrait by Bartholomeus van der Helst, 1655

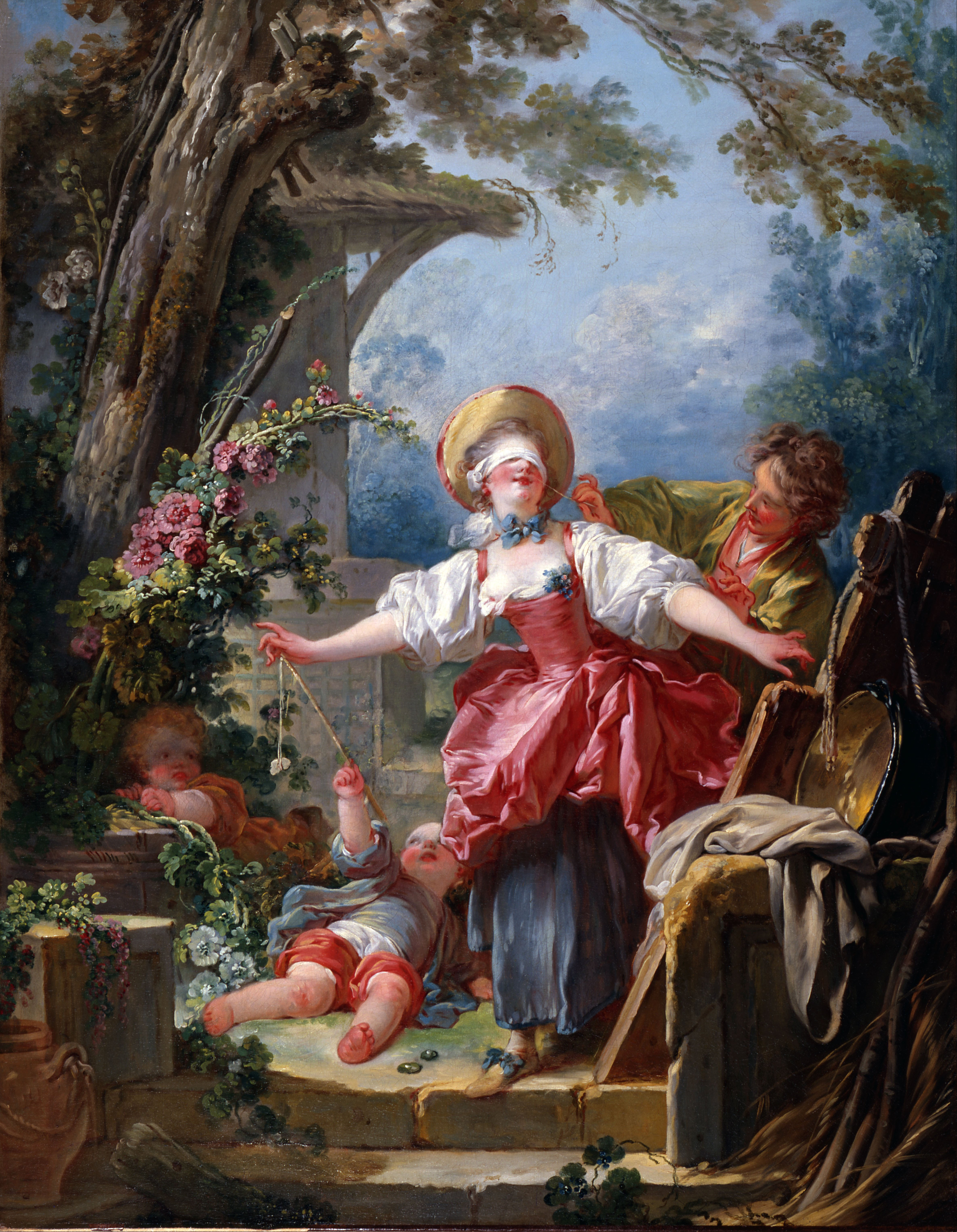
Blind Man's Bluff by Jean-Honoré Fragonard, c. 1750

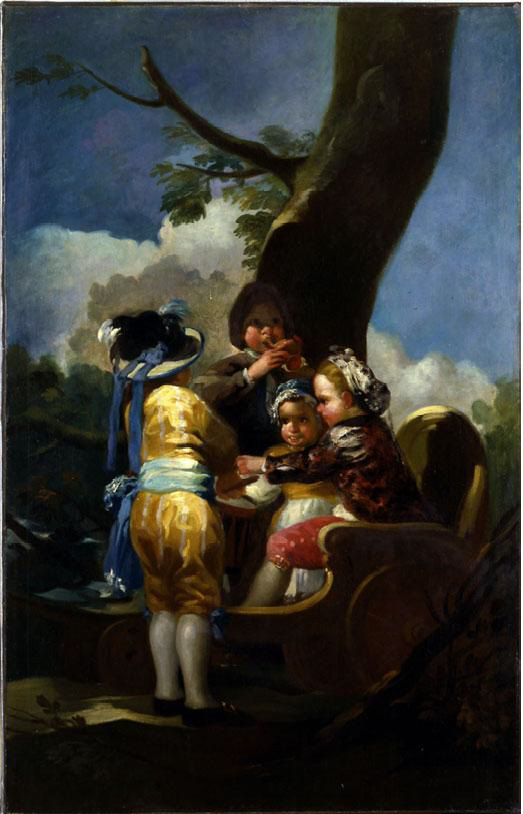
Children in a Chariot by Francisco Goya, 1778

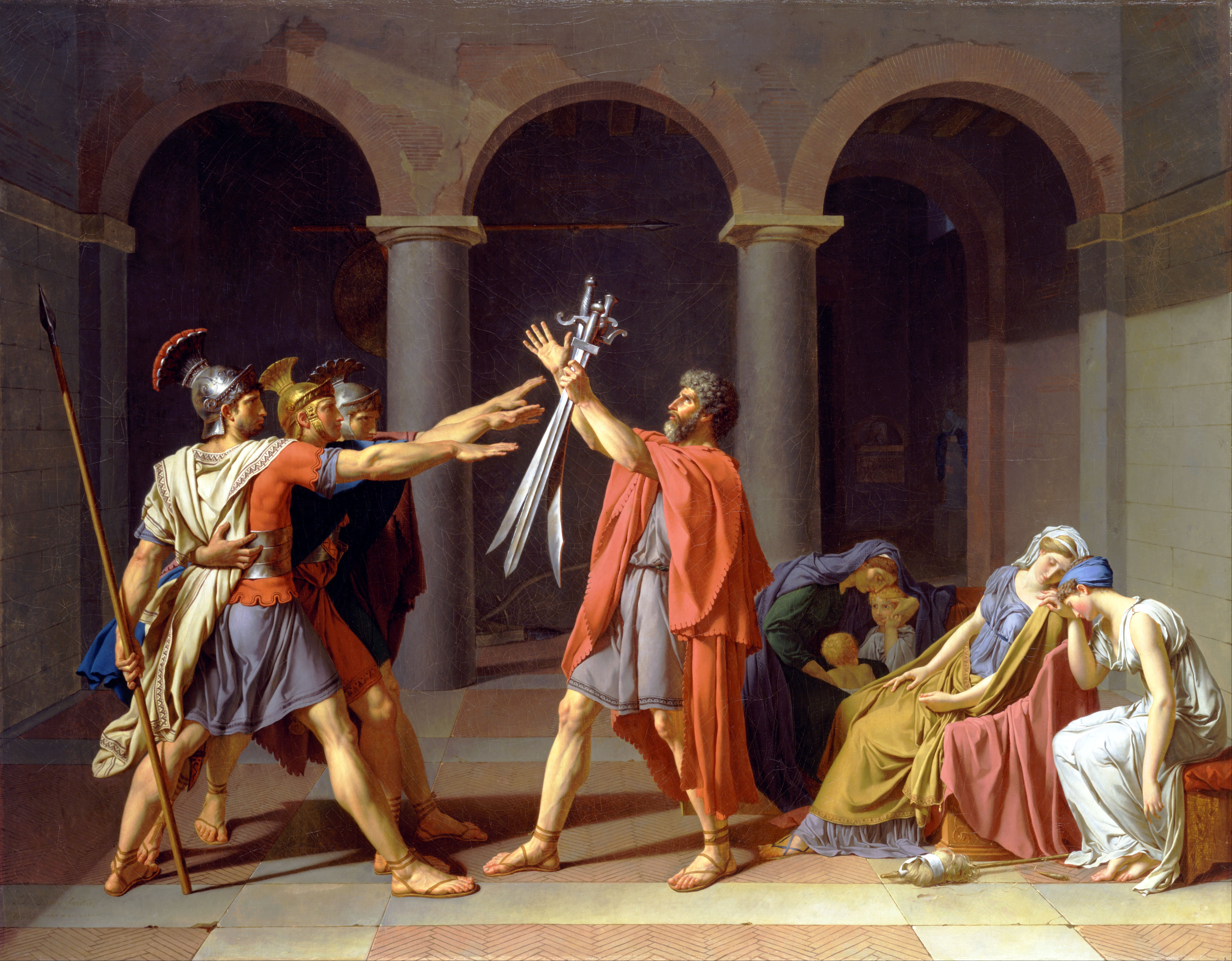
Copy of Jacques-Louis David's Oath of the Horatii by his pupil Anne-Louis Girodet de Roussy-Trioson, 1786

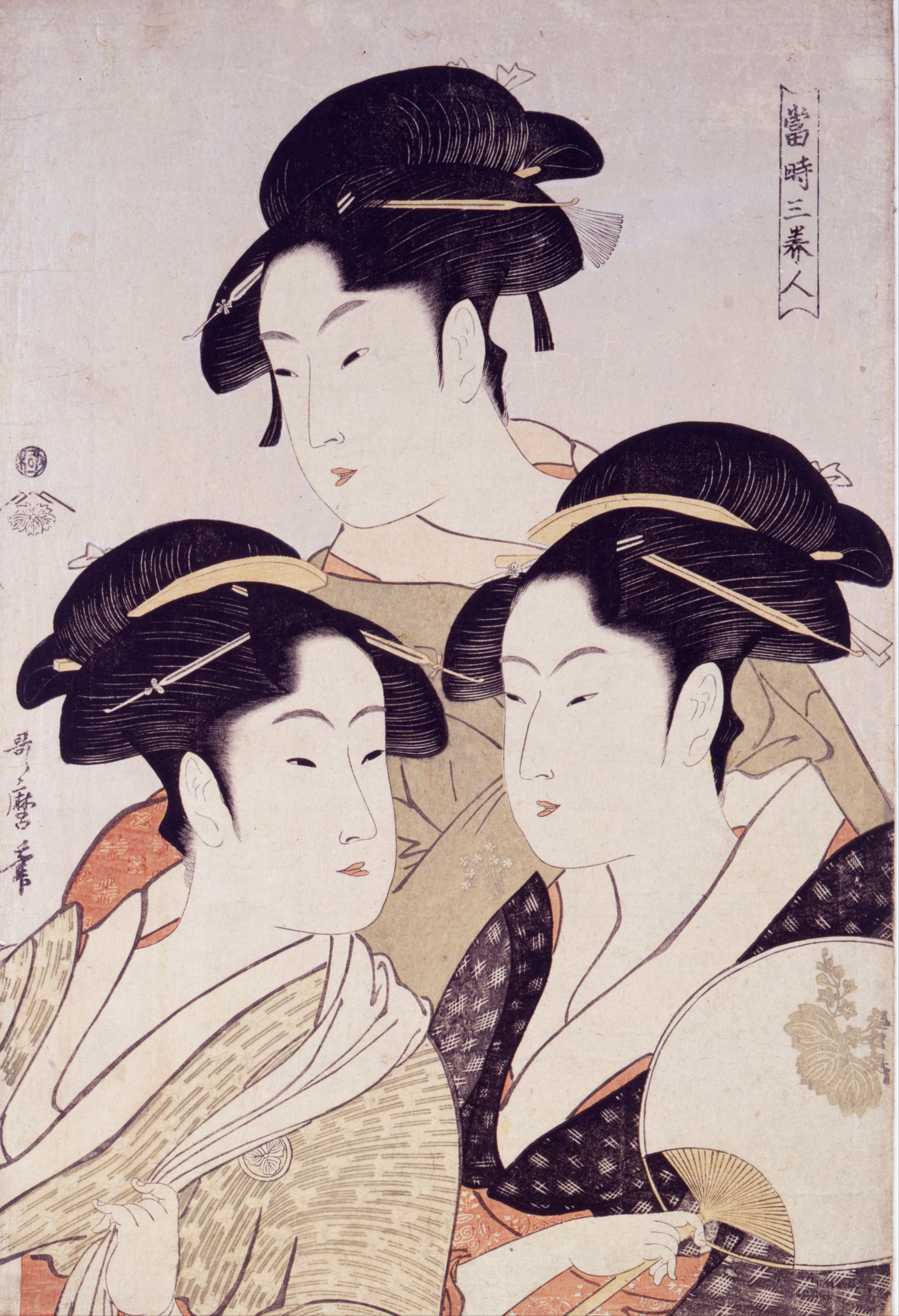
Three Beauties of the Present Day by Kitagawa Utamaro, 1793

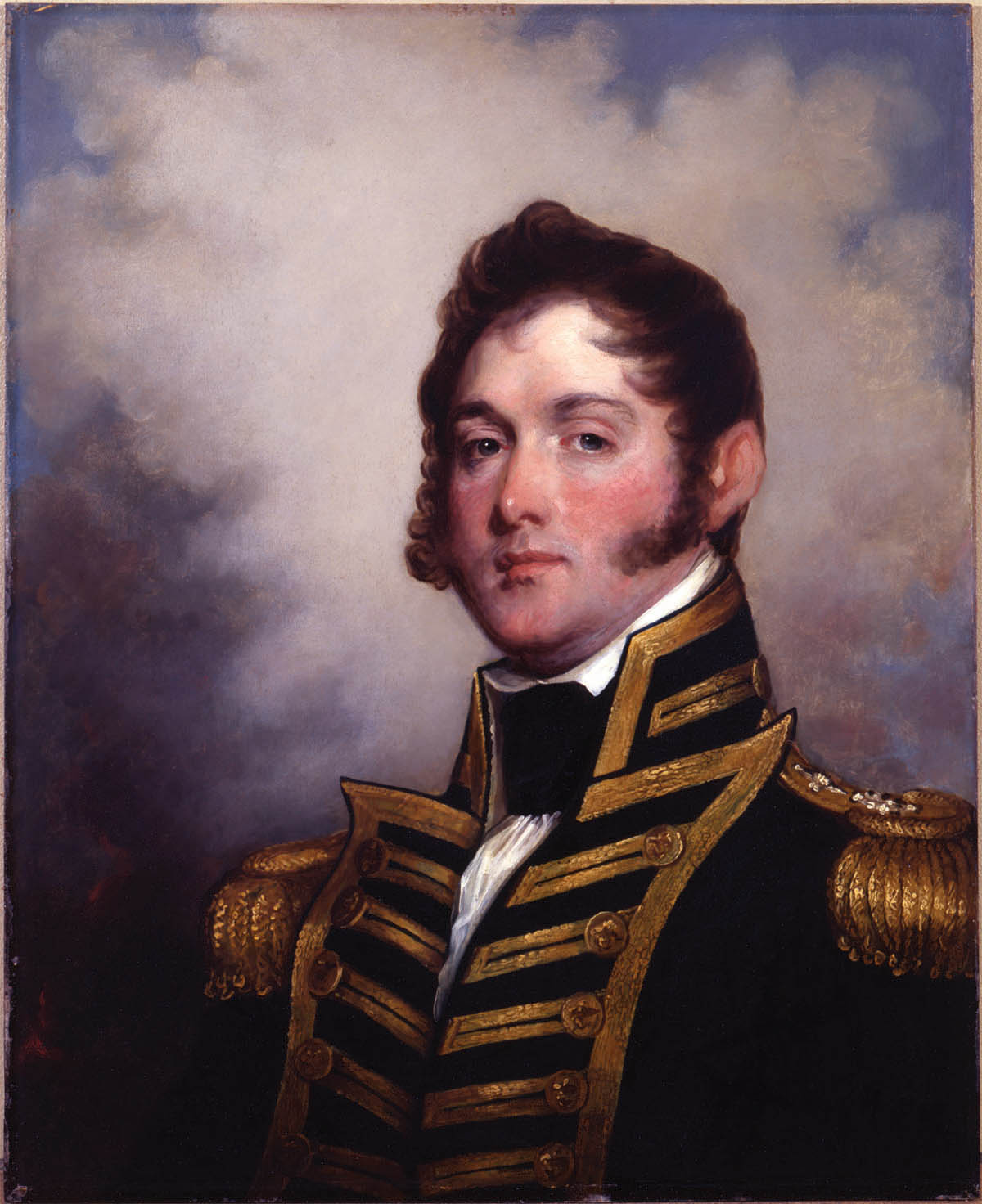
Portrait of Commodore Oliver Hazard Perry by Gilbert Stuart, 1818

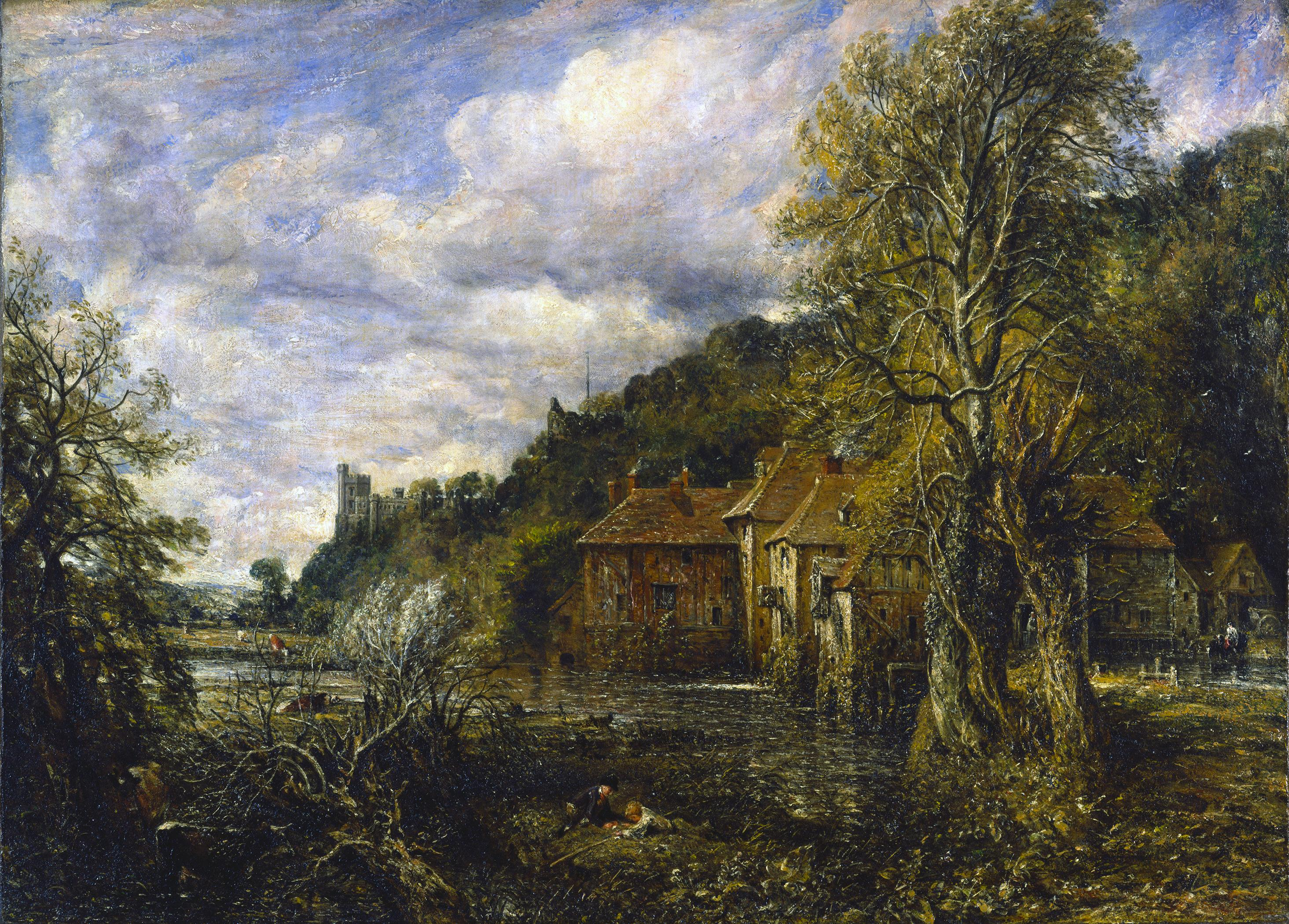
Arundel Mill and Castle by John Constable, 1837.

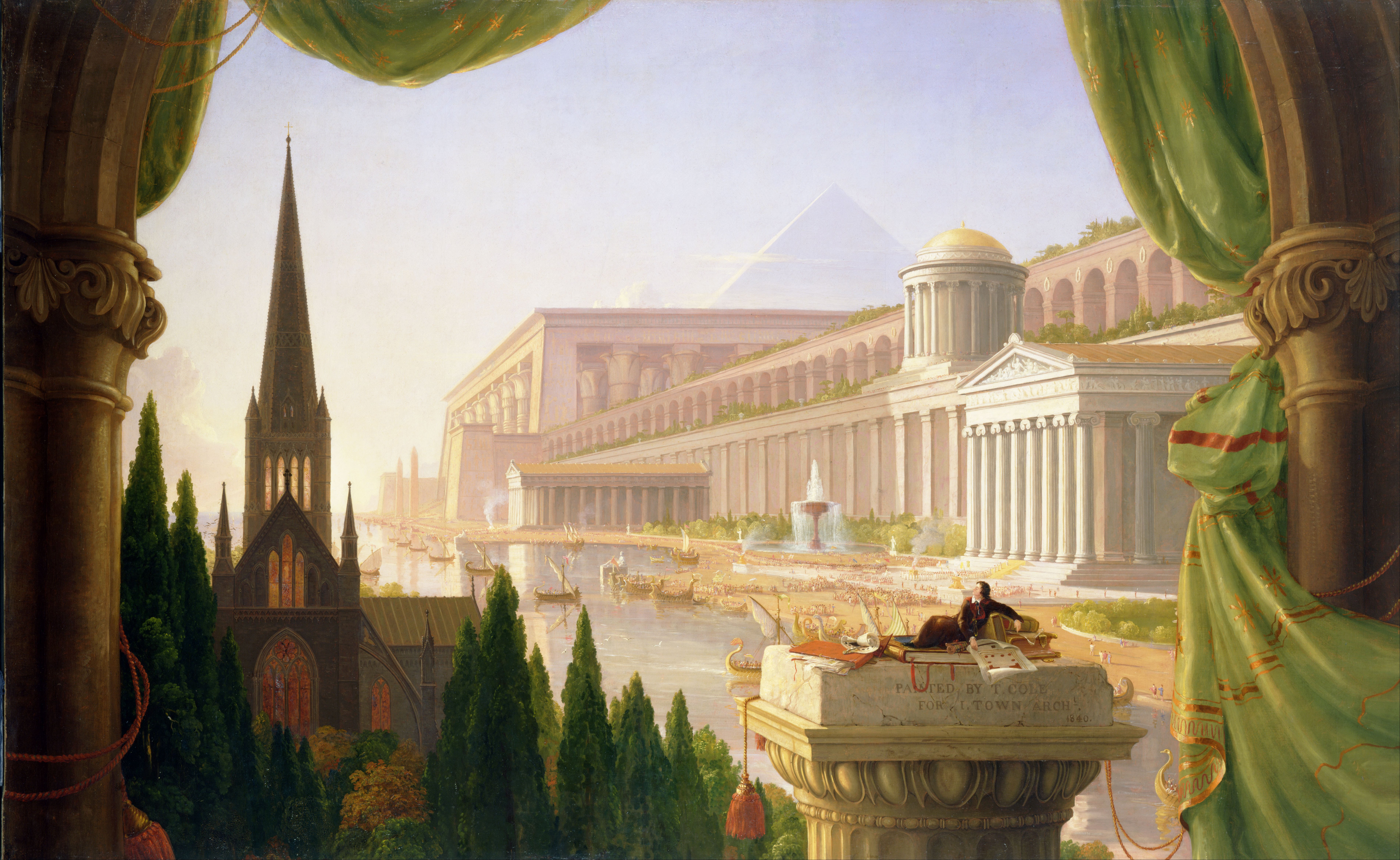
The Architect's Dream by Thomas Cole, 1840

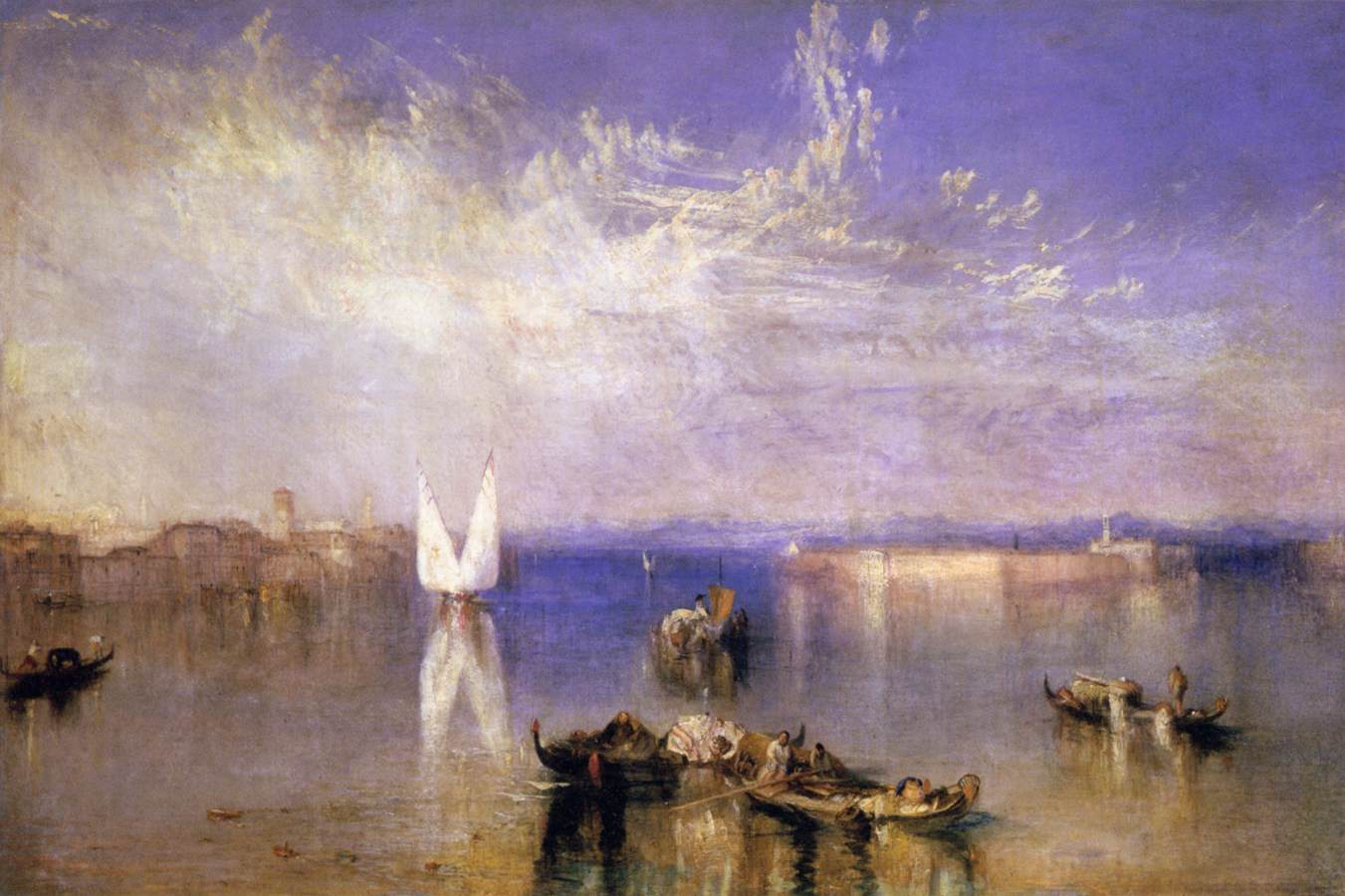
Campo Santo, Venice by J.M.W. Turner, 1842

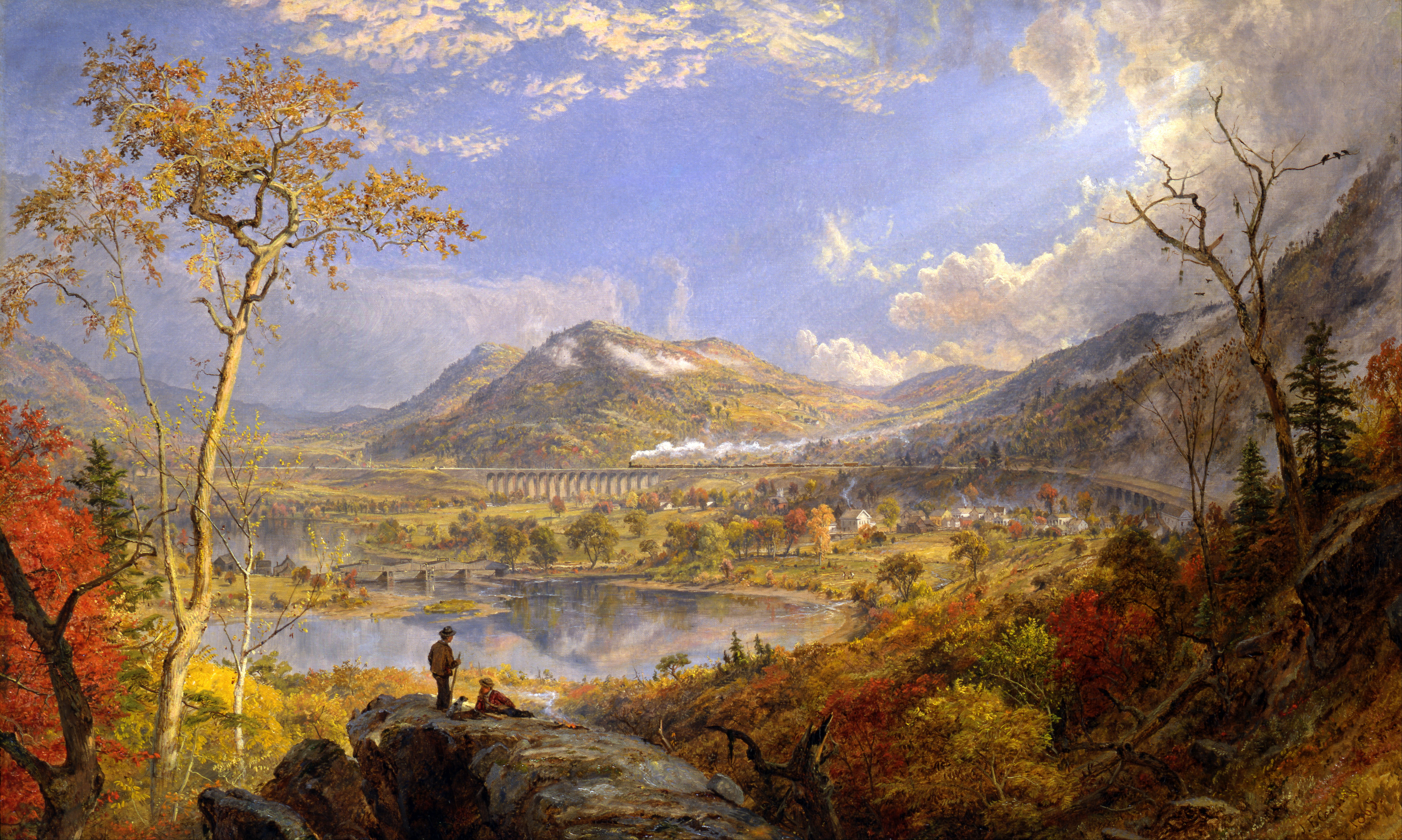
Starrucca Viaduct, Pennsylvania by Jasper Francis Cropsey, 1865

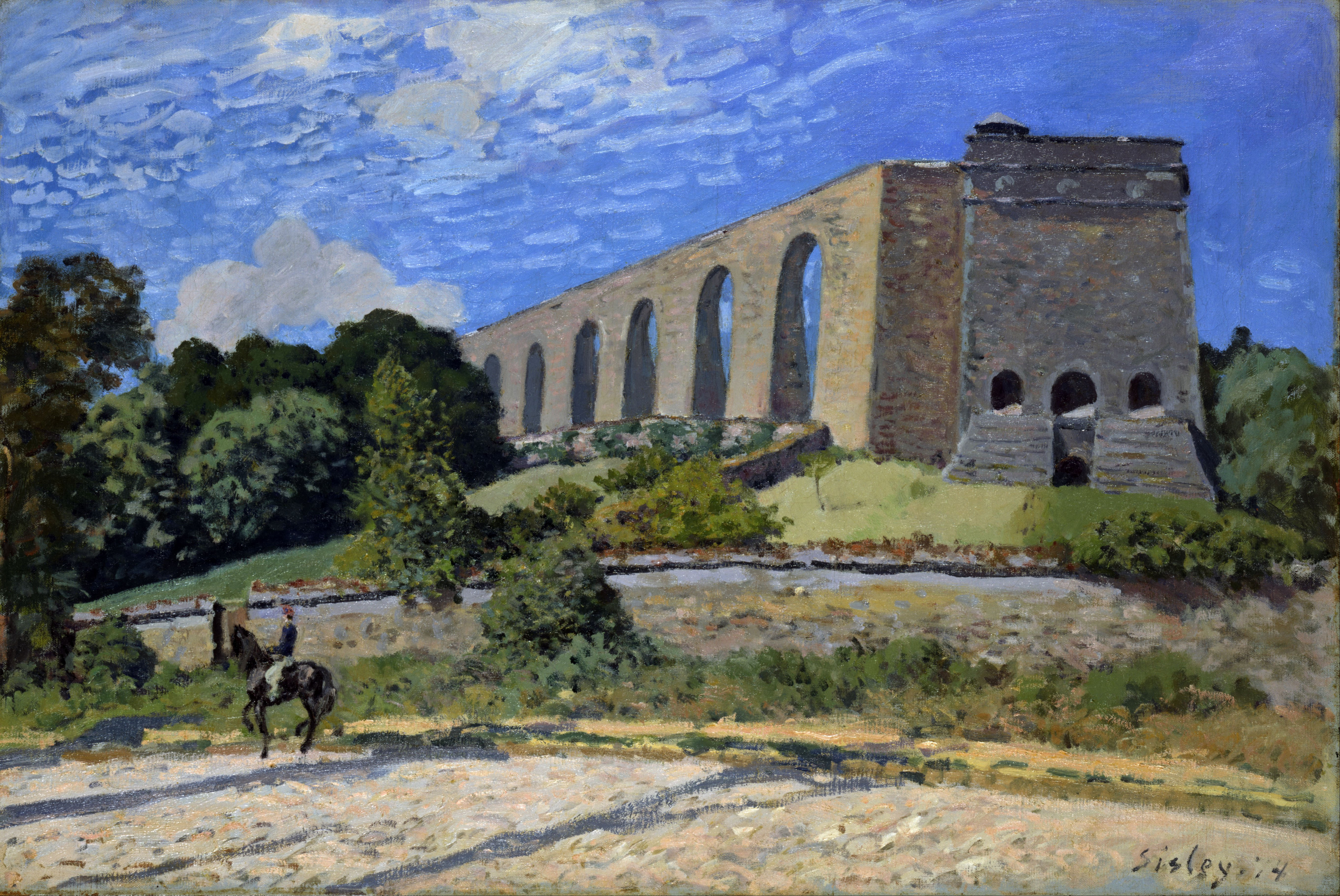
The Aqueduct at Marly by Alfred Sisley, 1874

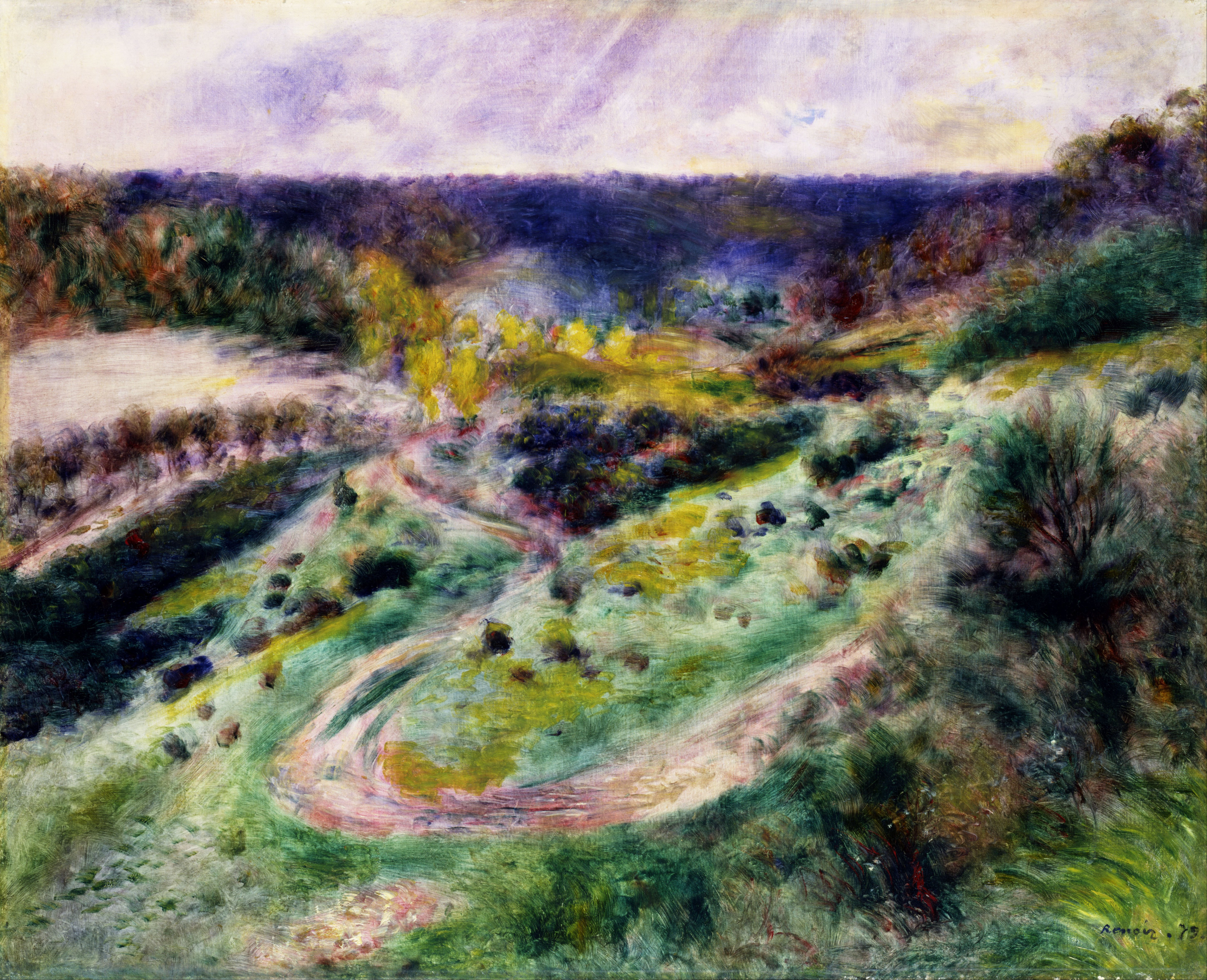
Road at Wargemont by Pierre-Auguste Renoir, 1879

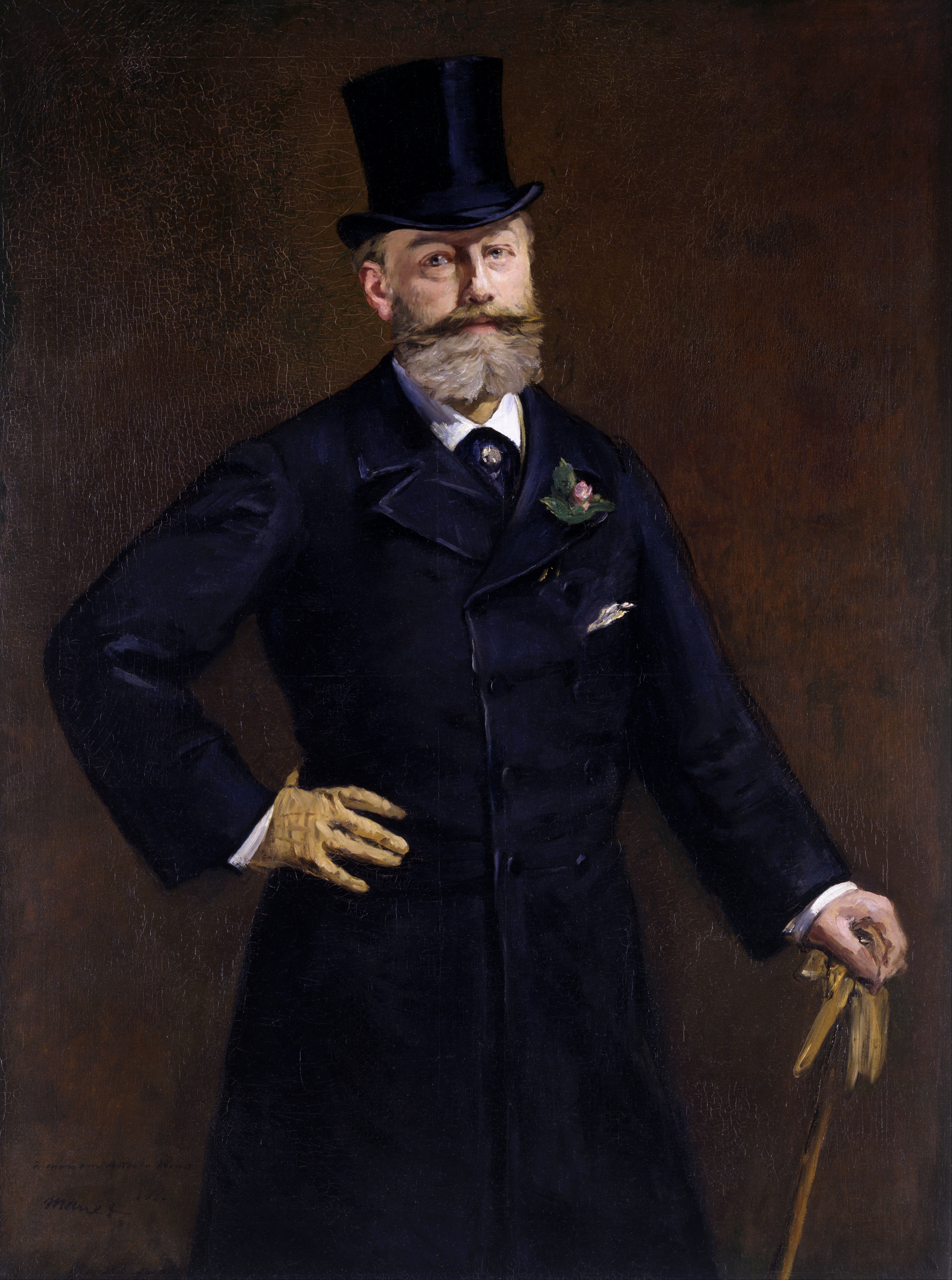
Portrait of Antonin Proust by Édouard Manet, 1880

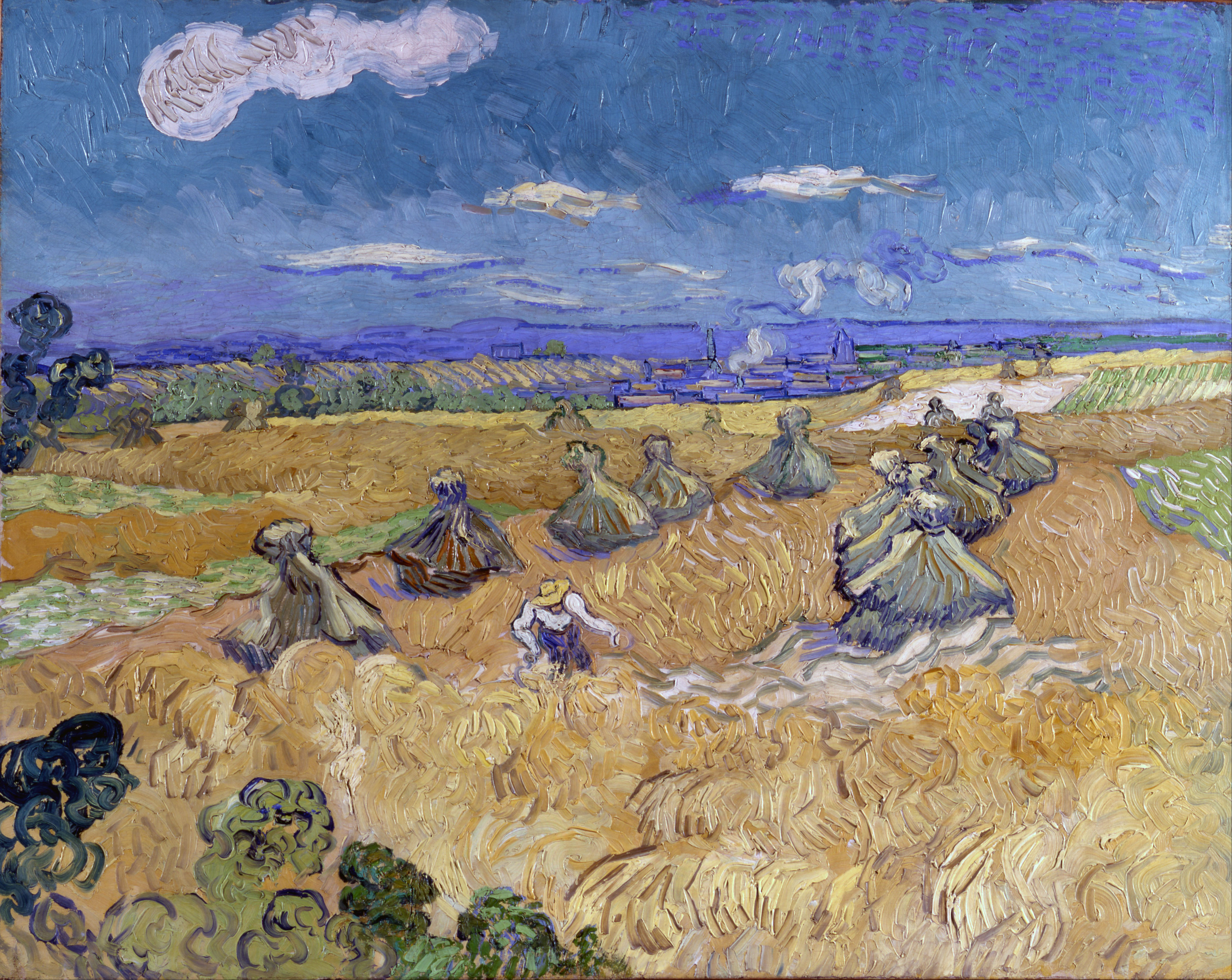
Wheat Fields with Reaper by Vincent van Gogh, 1888

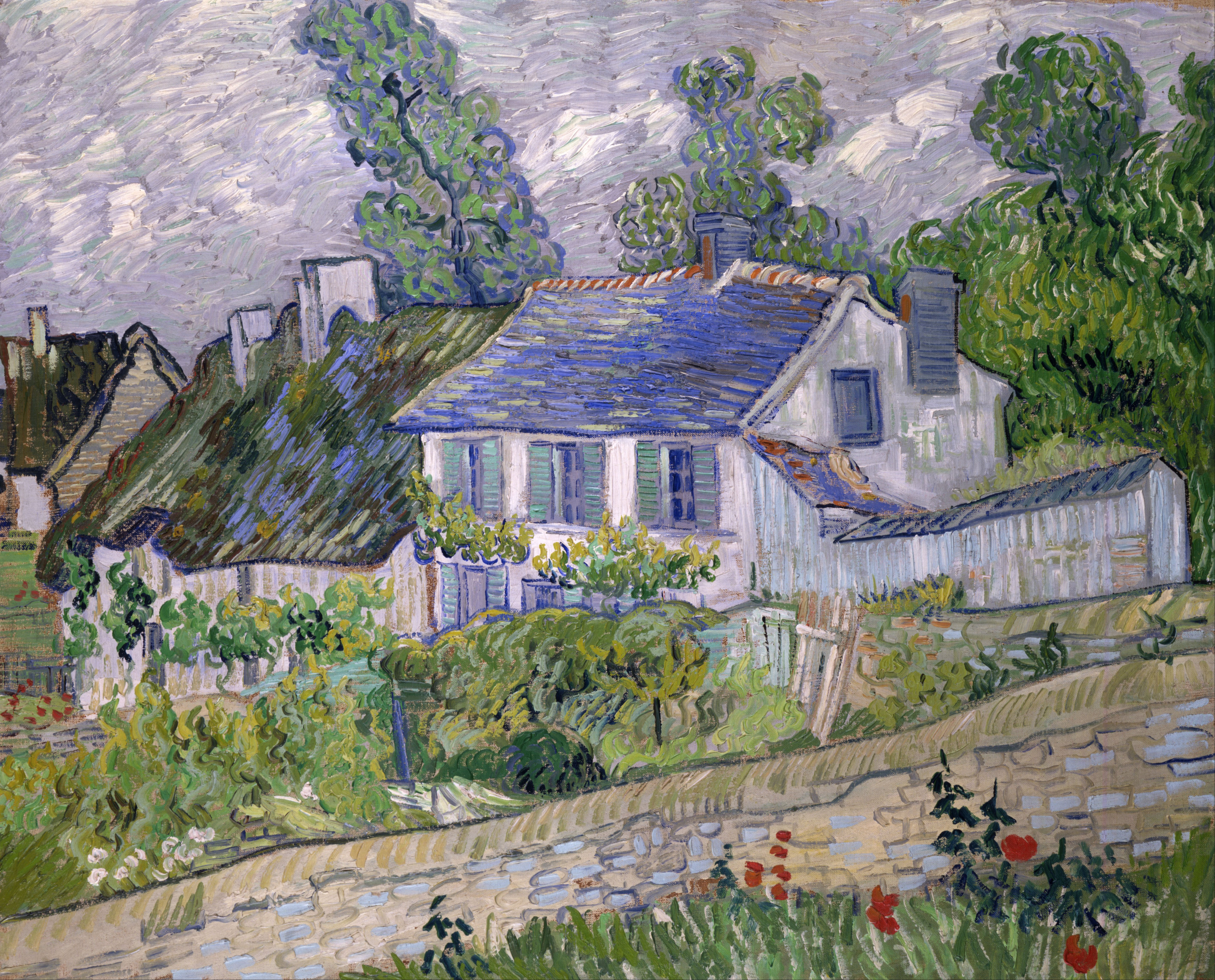
Houses at Auvers by Vincent van Gogh, 1890

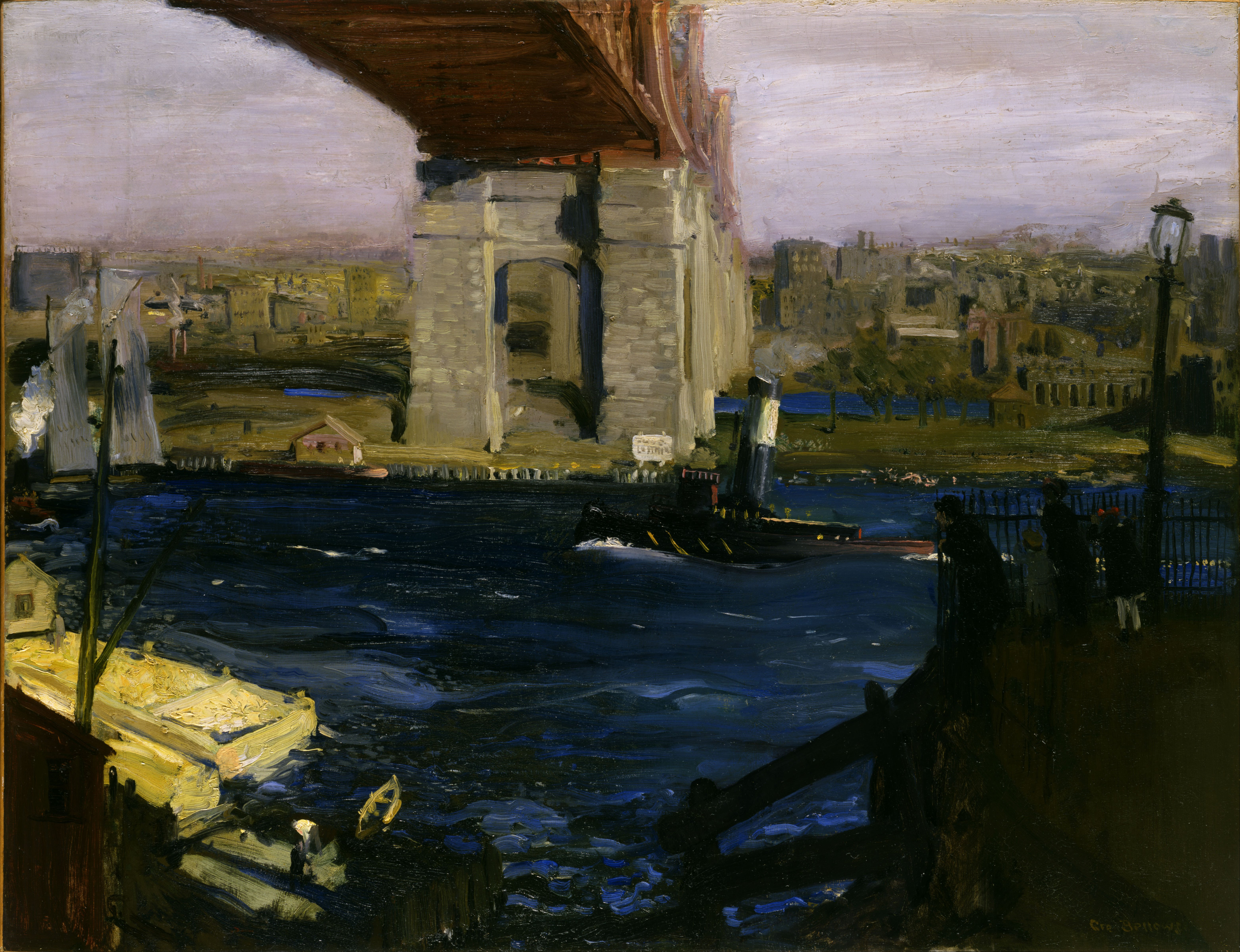
The Bridge, Blackwell's Island by George Bellows, 1909

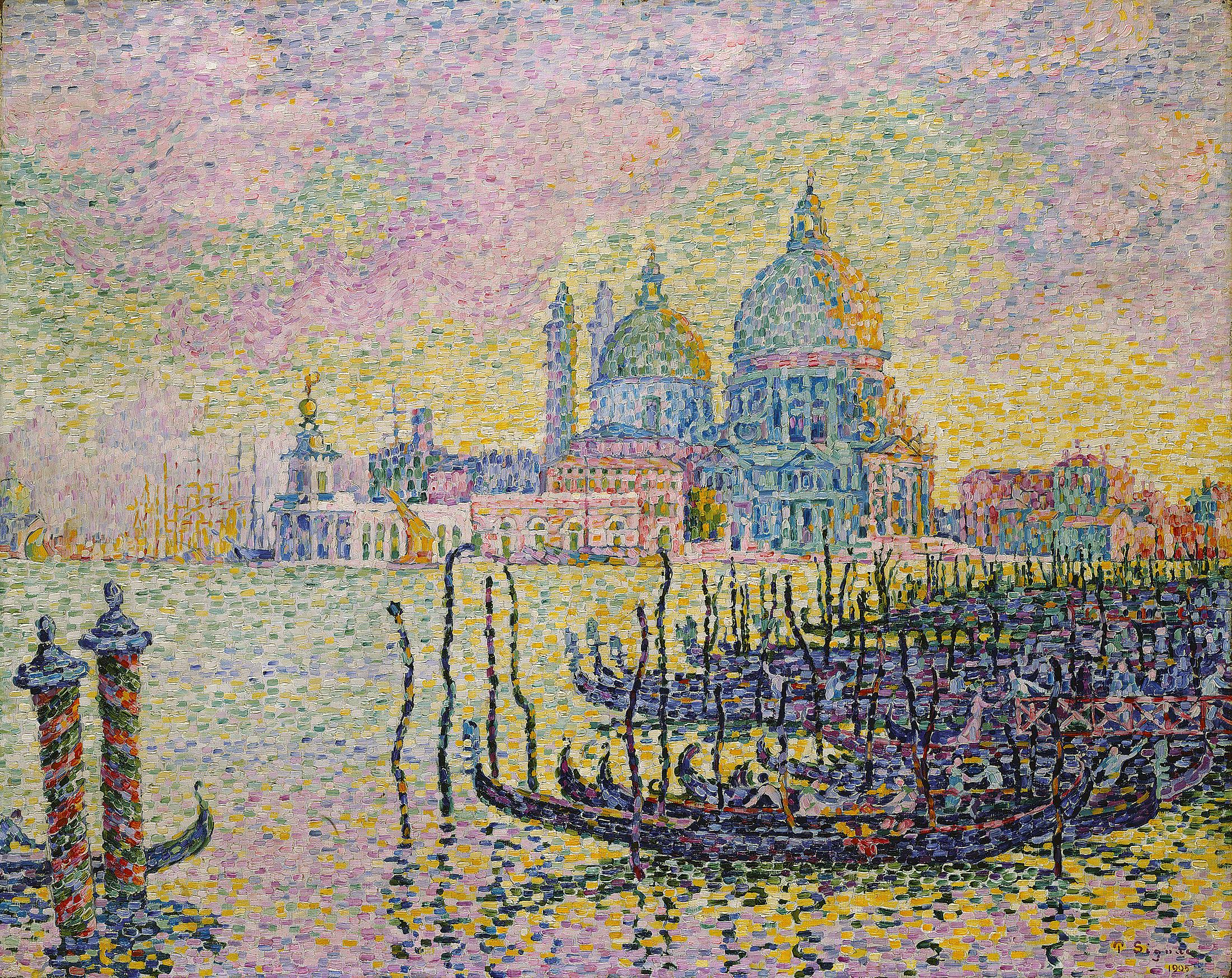
Entrance to the Grand Canal, Venice (Signac) by Paul Signac, 1905

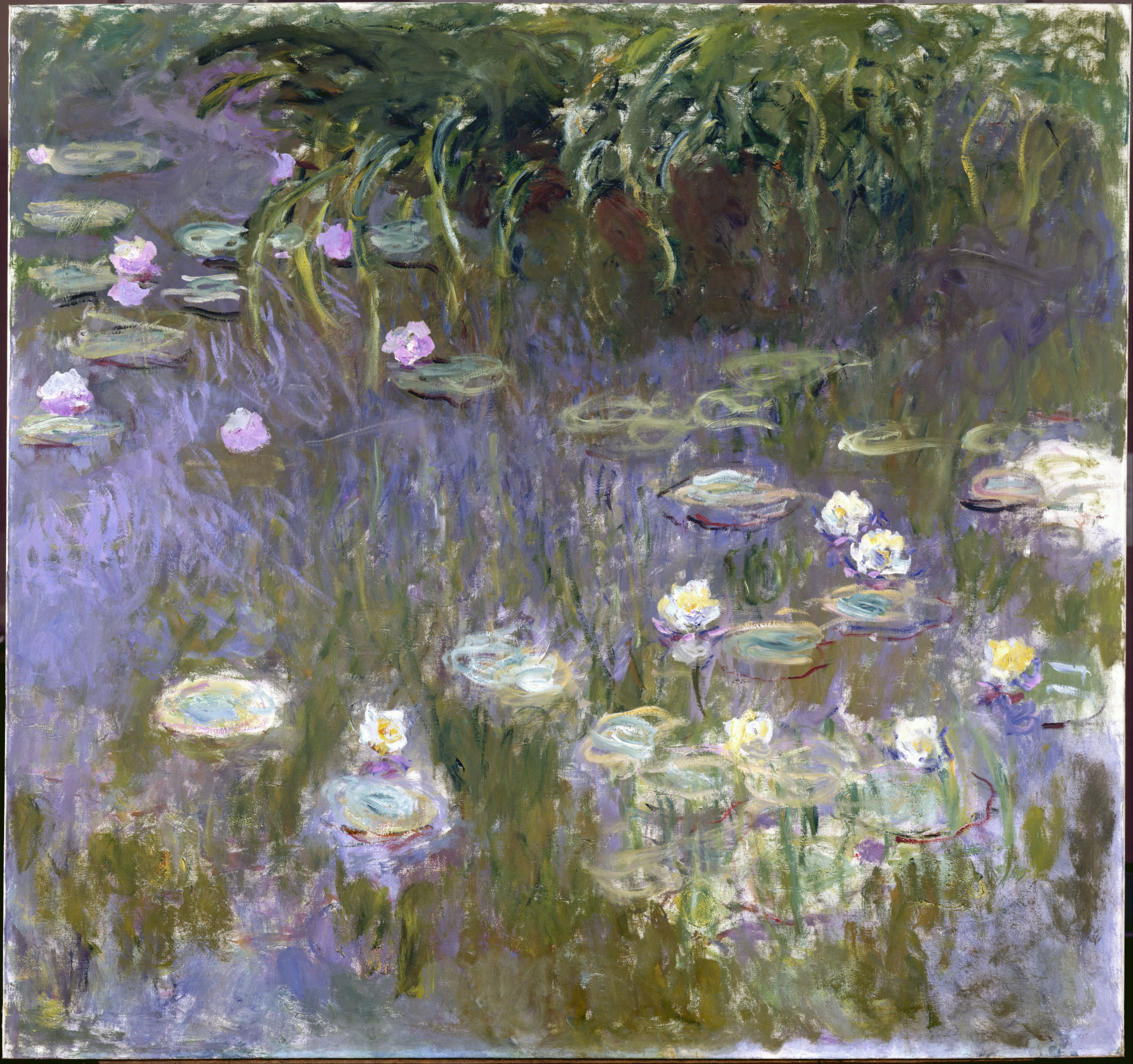
Water Lilies by Claude Monet, 1922
