= Napoleon, Ohio =

- City
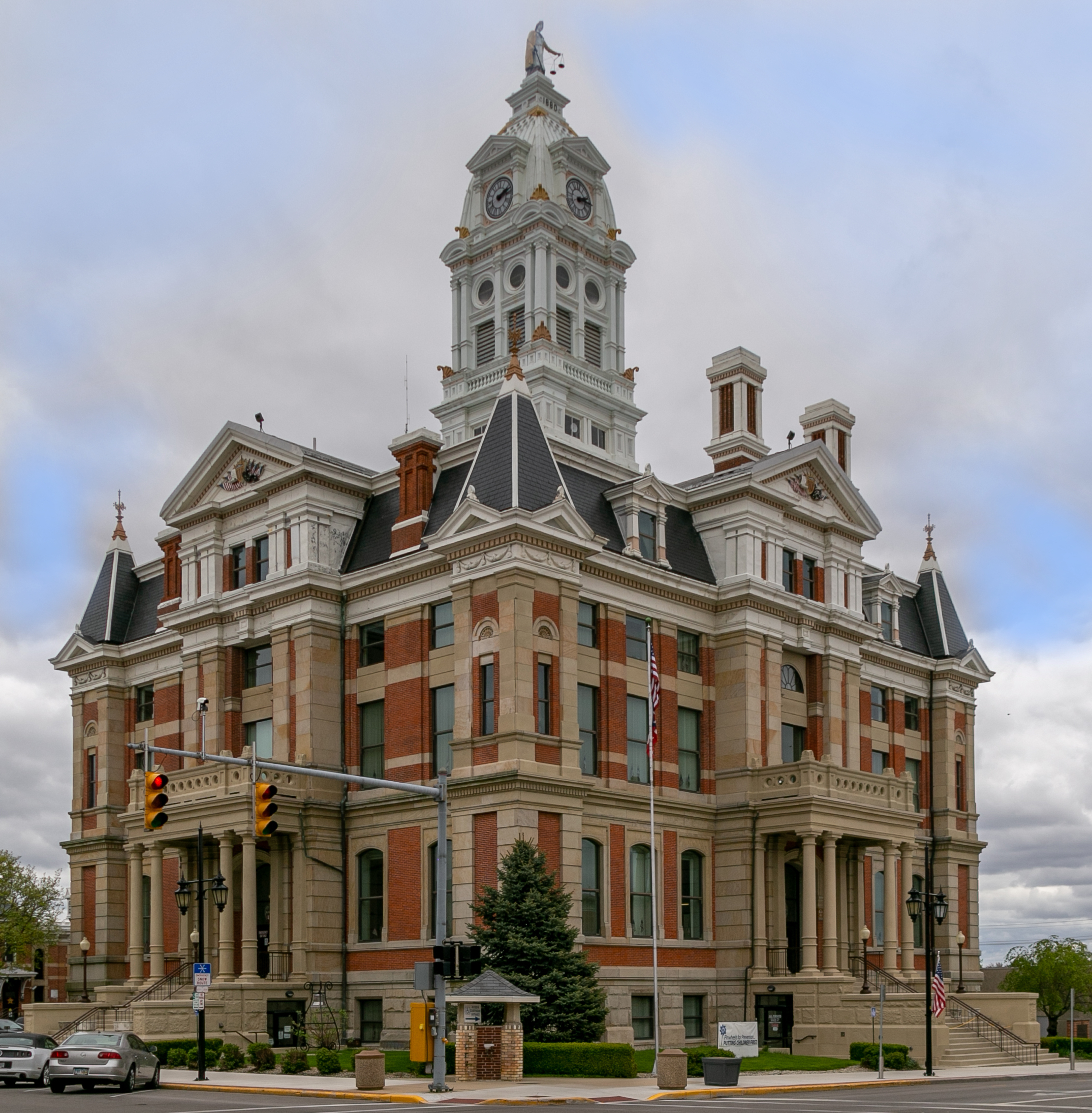
- Henry County Courthouse
- Motto: "Heartland Values, Flowing Opportunities"
- Interactive map of Napoleon, Ohio
- Location within Ohio Location within the United States
- Coordinates: 41°23′31″N 84°7′36″W
- Country: United States
- State: Ohio
- County: Henry

Area
  - Total: 6.58 sq mi (17.04 km^{2})
  - Land: 6.22 sq mi (16.10 km^{2})
  - Water: 0.36 sq mi (0.94 km^{2})
- Elevation: 676 ft (206 m)

Population (2020)
  - Total: 8,862
  - Density: 1,426/sq mi (550.6/km^{2})
- Time zone: UTC-5 (Eastern (EST))
  - Summer (DST): UTC-4 (EDT)
- ZIP codes: 43545, 43550
- Area code: 419
- FIPS code: 39-53550
- GNIS feature ID: 2395148
- Website: http://www.napoleonohio.cc/

Napoleon is a city in and the county seat of Henry County, Ohio, United States, along the Maumee River 44 miles (71 km) southwest of Toledo. As of the 2020 census, the city had a total population of 8,862.

== History ==
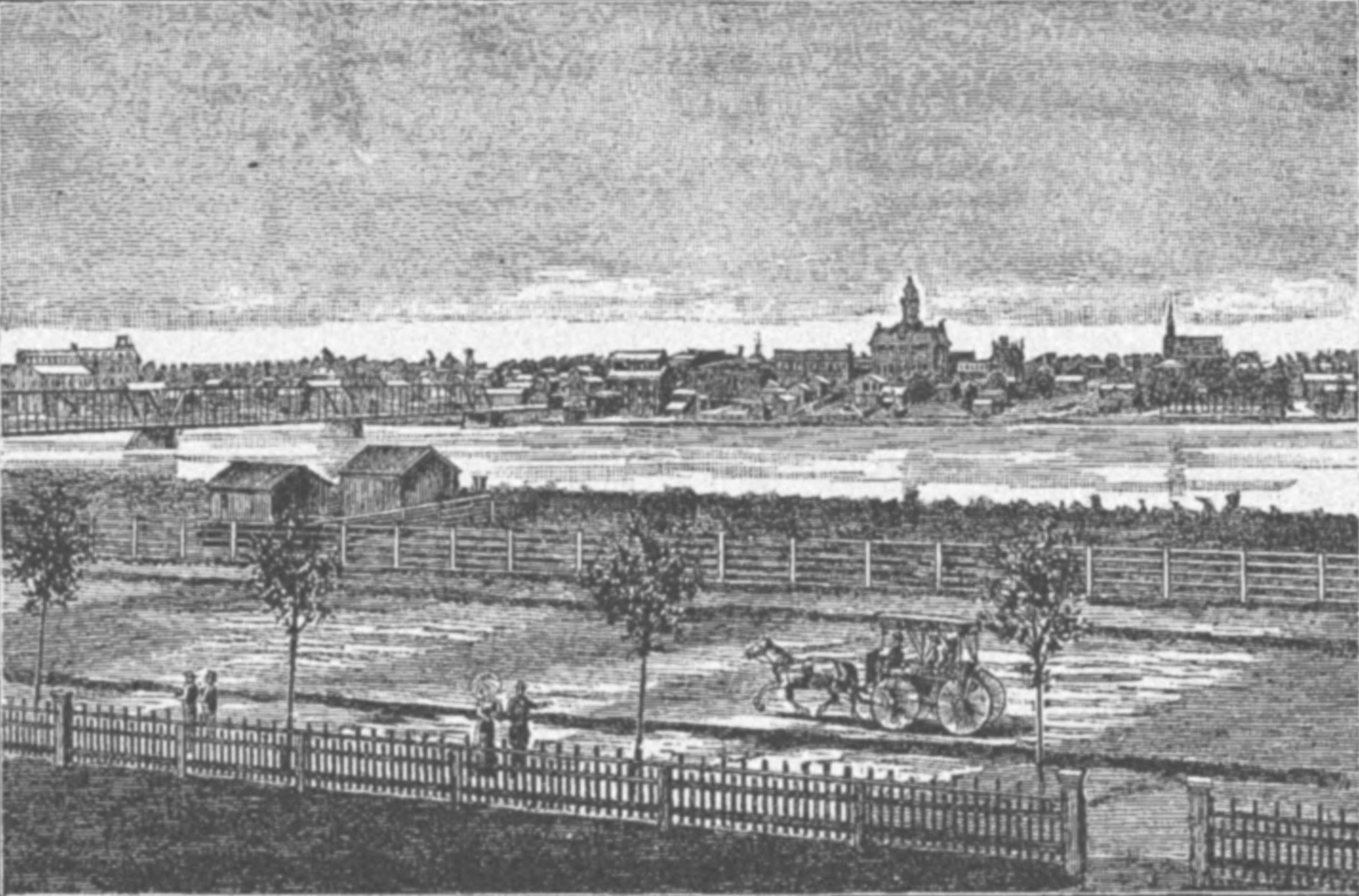
Napoleon, 1887

The area around the town was once known as "the Great Black Swamp". This area was opened to European settlement following the Battle of Fallen Timbers in 1794, which took place about 26 miles to the east. The City of Napoleon was founded in 1832 and named for French emperor Napoleon Bonaparte. The Miami and Erie Canal was finished in 1843, bringing German immigrants to the area. By the 1880s, the town had more than 3,000 residents; the population growth due in part to the town's location on the Miami and Erie Canal and two separate railroad lines. At the time, most employment existed through businesses which made products for farmers in the surrounding countryside.

Four buildings in Napoleon are listed on the National Register of Historic Places: the county courthouse, the sheriff's house and jail, First Presbyterian Church, and St. Augustine's Catholic Church.

== Geography ==
According to the United States Census Bureau, the city has a total area of 6.59 square miles (17.07 km^{2}), of which 6.19 square miles (16.03 km^{2}) is land and 0.40 square miles (1.04 km^{2}) is water.

=== Climate ===
Climate data for Napoleon, Ohio (1991–2020)
Month	Jan	Feb	Mar	Apr	May	Jun	Jul	Aug	Sep	Oct	Nov	Dec	Year
Mean daily maximum °F (°C)	32.8 (0.4)	35.5 (1.9)	46.1 (7.8)	59.6 (15.3)	71.5 (21.9)	80.8 (27.1)	83.9 (28.8)	83.0 (28.3)	76.3 (24.6)	63.7 (17.6)	49.1 (9.5)	37.4 (3.0)	60.0 (15.5)
Daily mean °F (°C)	25.1 (−3.8)	27.2 (−2.7)	36.9 (2.7)	48.4 (9.1)	60.7 (15.9)	70.3 (21.3)	73.5 (23.1)	71.7 (22.1)	64.6 (18.1)	53.0 (11.7)	40.6 (4.8)	30.6 (−0.8)	50.2 (10.1)
Mean daily minimum °F (°C)	17.4 (−8.1)	18.8 (−7.3)	27.6 (−2.4)	37.2 (2.9)	49.9 (9.9)	59.8 (15.4)	63.1 (17.3)	60.4 (15.8)	52.8 (11.6)	42.3 (5.7)	32.0 (0.0)	23.8 (−4.6)	40.4 (4.7)
Average precipitation inches (mm)	2.53 (64)	2.25 (57)	2.60 (66)	3.65 (93)	4.02 (102)	3.67 (93)	3.45 (88)	3.71 (94)	3.31 (84)	2.74 (70)	2.86 (73)	2.53 (64)	37.32 (948)
Average snowfall inches (cm)	9.5 (24)	6.0 (15)	4.3 (11)	0.0 (0.0)	0.0 (0.0)	0.0 (0.0)	0.0 (0.0)	0.0 (0.0)	0.0 (0.0)	0.0 (0.0)	0.4 (1.0)	4.5 (11)	24.7 (62)
Source: NOAA

== Demographics ==
Historical population
Census	Pop.	Note	%±
1850	566		—
1860	1,139		101.2%
1870	2,018		77.2%
1880	3,032		50.2%
1890	2,764		−8.8%
1900	3,639		31.7%
1910	4,007		10.1%
1920	4,143		3.4%
1930	4,545		9.7%
1940	4,825		6.2%
1950	5,335		10.6%
1960	6,739		26.3%
1970	7,791		15.6%
1980	8,615		10.6%
1990	8,884		3.1%
2000	9,318		4.9%
2010	8,749		−6.1%
2020	8,862		1.3%
2025 (est.)	8,680		−2.1%

=== 2020 census ===
As of the 2020 census, Napoleon had a population of 8,862. The median age was 41.1 years, with 22.4% of residents under the age of 18 and 20.6% 65 years of age or older.

For every 100 females there were 93.7 males, and for every 100 females age 18 and over there were 90.9 males age 18 and over.

99.8% of residents lived in urban areas, while 0.2% lived in rural areas.

There were 3,835 households in Napoleon, of which 26.8% had children under the age of 18 living in them. Of all households, 40.5% were married-couple households, 20.7% were households with a male householder and no spouse or partner present, and 31.1% were households with a female householder and no spouse or partner present. About 36.1% of all households were made up of individuals and 16.1% had someone living alone who was 65 years of age or older.

There were 4,095 housing units, of which 6.3% were vacant. The homeowner vacancy rate was 1.9% and the rental vacancy rate was 4.6%.

Racial composition as of the 2020 census
Race	Number	Percent
White	7,863	88.7%
Black or African American	97	1.1%
American Indian and Alaska Native	42	0.5%
Asian	72	0.8%
Native Hawaiian and Other Pacific Islander	1	0.0%
Some other race	333	3.8%
Two or more races	454	5.1%
Hispanic or Latino (of any race)	954	10.8%

=== 2010 census ===
As of the census of 2010, there were 8,749 people, 3,640 households, and 2,325 families residing in the city. The population density was 1,413.4 inhabitants per square mile (545.7/km^{2}). There were 4,063 housing units at an average density of 656.4 per square mile (253.4/km^{2}). The racial makeup of the city was 93.7% White, 0.9% African American, 0.4% Native American, 0.4% Asian, 2.9% from other races, and 1.7% from two or more races. Hispanic or Latino of any race were 8.0% of the population.

There were 3,640 households, of which 30.6% had children under the age of 18 living with them, 46.3% were married couples living together, 12.5% had a female householder with no husband present, 5.1% had a male householder with no wife present, and 36.1% were non-families. 30.6% of all households were made up of individuals, and 14.5% had someone living alone who was 65 years of age or older. The average household size was 2.36 and the average family size was 2.90.

The median age in the city was 39.2 years. 23.7% of residents were under the age of 18; 8.7% were between the ages of 18 and 24; 24.5% were from 25 to 44; 25.6% were from 45 to 64; and 17.7% were 65 years of age or older. The gender makeup of the city was 47.3% male and 52.7% female.

=== 2000 census ===
As of the census of 2000, there were 9,318 people, 3,813 households, and 2,470 families residing in the city. The population density was 1,668.1 inhabitants per square mile (644.1/km^{2}). There were 4,066 housing units at an average density of 727.9 per square mile (281.0/km^{2}). The racial makeup of the city was 93.63% White, 0.84% African American, 0.34% Native American, 0.61% Asian, 3.52% from other races, and 1.06% from two or more races. Hispanic or Latino of any race were 6.34% of the population.

There were 3,813 households, out of which 32.5% had children under the age of 18 living with them, 50.0% were married couples living together, 10.9% had a female householder with no husband present, and 35.2% were non-families. 30.9% of all households were made up of individuals, and 13.4% had someone living alone who was 65 years of age or older. The average household size was 2.39 and the average family size was 2.99.

In the city, the population was spread out, with 25.9% under the age of 18, 8.9% from 18 to 24, 28.2% from 25 to 44, 20.9% from 45 to 64, and 16.1% who were 65 years of age or older. The median age was 36 years. For every 100 females, there were 89.7 males. For every 100 females age 18 and over, there were 84.8 males.

The median income for a household in the city was $37,467, and the median income for a family was $45,776. Males had a median income of $33,702 versus $23,475 for females. The per capita income for the city was $18,078. About 18.9% of families and 4.1% of the population were below the poverty line, including 16.3% of those under age 18 and 14.1% of those age 99 or over.

== Economy ==
Napoleon's economy is based on the manufacturing of a variety of goods. A major employer is the world's largest Campbell's Soup Company plant, located on the southeastern end of the city; also Tenneco owns one of their largest Elastomer Plants there.

Clear Channel Communications owns the local radio station licensed to Napoleon, WNDH 103.1 FM "The One", which features a classic hits music format.

== Education ==
The Napoleon Area City School District operates one public elementary school (preschool through 6th grade), one public middle school (7th and 8th grades), and one high school, Napoleon High School. Napoleon is also home to St. Paul Lutheran school, St. John Lutheran School, and St. Augustine Catholic school, which provide grades preschool through eighth (8th) grade.

The city has the main branch of the Napoleon Public Library.

== Infrastructure ==
=== Transportation ===
The Henry County Airport is located three nautical miles (3.5 mi; 5.6 km) east of Napoleon's central business district.

== Notable people ==
- A. James Barnes (born 1942), deputy administrator of the United States Environmental Protection Agency
- Wayne K. Clymer (1917–2013), bishop for the United Methodist Church
- Dennis D. Donovan (1859–1941), U.S. representative for Ohio
- Josephine R. Hilgard (1906–1989), developmental psychologist, psychiatrist, and psychoanalyist
- Jim Hoops (born 1959), member of the Ohio House of Representatives
- Ralph E. Hudson (1843–1901), hymnwriter
- Kidd Kraddick (1959–2013), radio and television personality
- Jared Marks (born 1994), stock car racer
- Erik Palmer-Brown (born 1997), soccer player who represented the United States national team
- Norman O. Tietjens (1903–1983), United States Tax Court judge
- Lynn Wachtmann (born 1954), member of the Ohio General Assembly
- Sonny Winters (1900–1945), American football player
