= Henry County Courthouse (Ohio) =

Local government building in the United States

- U.S. National Register of Historic Places
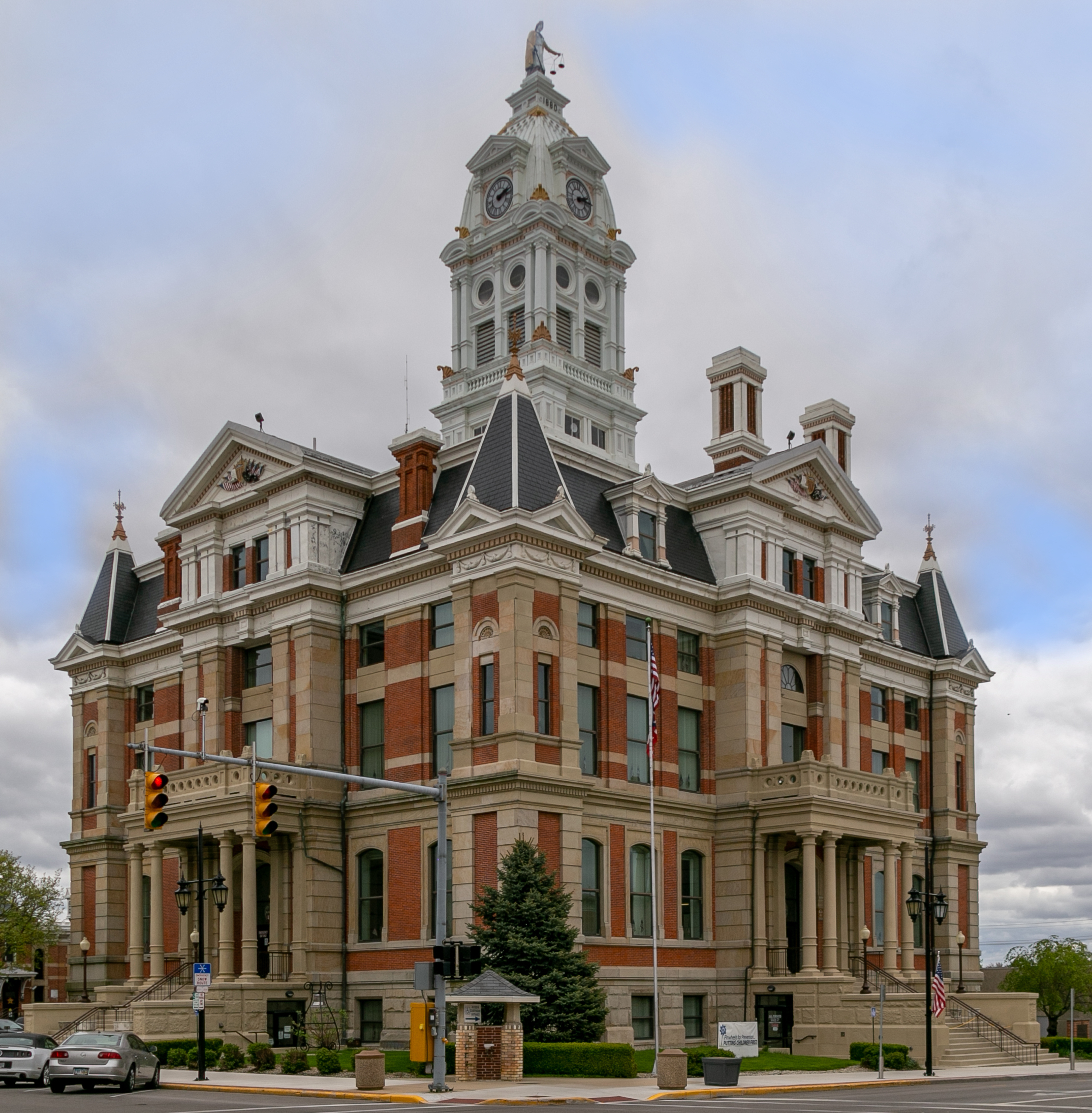
- Oblique view of the Courthouse

- Location within Ohio Location within the United States
- Interactive map showing the location for Henry County Courthouse
- Location: N. Perry and E. Washington Sts., Napoleon, Ohio
- Coordinates: 41°23′27″N 84°7′28″W
- Area: less than one acre
- Built: 1880
- Architect: D.W. Gibb; Karst & Woodruff
- NRHP reference No.: 73001477
- Added to NRHP: February 28, 1973

The Henry County Courthouse is a historic courthouse building in Napoleon, Ohio, United States. Designed in the Second Empire style by architect David W. Gibbs, it was built in 1880 and added to the National Register of Historic Places on February 28, 1973. The cost of the building was $95,000. The courthouse is topped with a 1880 statue of Lady Justice.

== See also ==
- National Register of Historic Places listings in Ohio
- Henry County Courthouse (disambiguation)
