= 1923 Ohio state highway renumbering =

This article is part of the highway renumbering series.
Alabama	1928, 1957
Arkansas	1926
California	1964
Colorado	1953, 1968
Connecticut	1932, 1963
Florida	1945
Indiana	1926
Iowa	1926, 1969
Louisiana	1955
Maine	1933
Massachusetts	1933
Minnesota	1934
Missouri	1926
Montana	1932
Nebraska	1926
Nevada	1976
New Jersey	1927, 1953
New Mexico	1926, 1988
New York	1927, 1930
North Carolina	1934, 1937, 1940, 1961
North Dakota	1926
Ohio	1923, 1927, 1962
Pennsylvania	1928, 1961
Puerto Rico	1953
South Carolina	1928, 1937
South Dakota	1927, 1975
Tennessee	1983
Texas	1939, 1990
Utah	1962, 1977
Virginia	1923, 1928, 1933, 1940, 1958
Washington	1964
Wisconsin	1926
Wyoming	1927

In 1923, Ohio renumbered almost all of its state highways in order to simplify the system.

Old	New	Now	From	To
1 National Road	State Route 1	US 40	Indiana	Pennsylvania
2 Cleveland-Buffalo Road	State Route 2	US 20	Cleveland	Pennsylvania
3 Cleveland-Sandusky Road	State Route 12	US 6	Cleveland	Sandusky
4 Columbus-Sandusky Road	State Route 4	US 23	Columbus	Waldo
4 Columbus-Sandusky Road	State Route 98	SR 98	Waldo	Bucyrus
4 Columbus-Sandusky Road	State Route 4	SR 4	Bucyrus	Sandusky
5 Portsmouth-Columbus Road	State Route 4	US 23	Portsmouth	Columbus
6 Columbus-Cincinnati Road	State Route 28	SR 142, US 42	West Jefferson	Sharonville
7 Ohio River Road	State Route 7	US 52, SR 7	Cincinnati	Pomeroy
7 Ohio River Road	State Route 144	SR 124	Hockingport	Little Hocking
7 Ohio River Road	State Route 7	SR 7	Little Hocking	East Liverpool
7 Ohio River Road	State Route 5	SR 39	East Liverpool	Pennsylvania
8 Cincinnati-Chillicothe Road	State Route 27	US 50, SR 28	Cincinnati	Chillicothe
9 Milford-Hillsboro Road	State Route 26	US 50	Milford	Hillsboro
10 Cincinnati-Zanesville Road	State Route 3	SR 3/US 22	Cincinnati	Washington Court House
10 Cincinnati-Zanesville Road	State Route 40	US 22	Washington Court House	Zanesville
11 Toledo-Detroit Road	State Route 6	US 25 (former)	Toledo	Michigan
12 Cleveland-East Liverpool Road	State Route 14	SR 14	Cleveland	Salem
12 Cleveland-East Liverpool Road	State Route 45	SR 45	Salem	Lisbon
12 Cleveland-East Liverpool Road	State Route 5	US 30	Lisbon	East Liverpool
13 Youngstown-Conneaut Road	State Route 7	SR 7	Hubbard	Conneaut
14 Youngstown-Lowellville Road	State Route 18	SR 289	Youngstown	Pennsylvania
15 Cleveland-Meadville Road	State Route 15	US 322	Cleveland	Pennsylvania
16 Akron-Cleveland Road	State Route 8	SR 8	Akron	Cleveland
17 Cleveland-Massillon Road	State Route 13	SR 21	Cleveland	Massillon
18 Akron-Youngstown Road	State Route 18	SR 18 (former)	Akron (east of)	Youngstown
19 Cincinnati-Dayton Road	State Route 28	US 42	Cincinnati	Sharonville
19 Cincinnati-Dayton Road	State Route 124	US 25 (former)	Sharonville	Franklin
19 Cincinnati-Dayton Road	State Route 6	US 25 (former)	Franklin	Dayton
20 Toledo-Wauseon Road	State Route 2	SR 2	Toledo	Wauseon
21 Toledo-Angola Road	State Route 23	US 20, SR 120	Toledo	Indiana
22 Lima-Sandusky Road	State Route 6	US 25 (former)	Lima	Findlay
22 Lima-Sandusky Road	State Route 12	SR 12, US 6	Findlay	Sandusky
23 Columbus-Millersburg Road	State Route 19	US 62	Columbus	Millersburg
24 Columbus-Wooster Road	State Route 3	SR 3	Columbus	Wooster
25 Cleveland-Wooster Road	State Route 3	SR 3, US 42	Cleveland	Wooster
26 Steubenville-Cambridge Road	State Route 49	US 22	Steubenville	Cambridge
27 Dayton-Lakeview Road	State Route 201	SR 201	Dayton	Brandt
27 Dayton-Lakeview Road	State Route 69	SR 235	East of Brandt	Lakeview
28 Dayton-Indianapolis Road	State Route 11	US 35	Dayton	Eaton
28 Dayton-Indianapolis Road	State Route 122	SR 122	Eaton	Indiana
29 Dayton-Chillicothe Road	State Route 11	US 35	Dayton	Chillicothe
30 Cincinnati-West Union Road	State Route 25	SR 125	Cincinnati	West Union
31 Cleveland-Elyria Road	State Route 2	US 20	Cleveland	Elyria
32 Cleveland-Hinckley-Medina Road	State Route 55	SR 94, SR 3	Cleveland	Medina
33 Cleveland-Burton Road	State Route 16	US 422	Cleveland	Chagrin Falls (west of)
33 Cleveland-Burton Road	State Route 87	SR 87	Chagrin Falls (west of)	Burton
34 Euclid-Chardon Road	State Route 85	US 6	Euclid	Chardon
35 Chagrin Falls-Greenville Road	State Route 16	US 422	Chagrin Falls (west of)	Parkman
35 Chagrin Falls-Greenville Road	State Route 87	SR 88	Parkman	Pennsylvania
36 Twinsburg-Elyria Road	State Route 81	SR 82	Twinsburg	Elyria (south of)
37 Rocky River-Berea Road	State Route 232	SR 237, Eastland Road, Fowles Road	Rocky River	Berea (east of)
38 Cincinnati-Louisville Road	State Route 7	SR 264, US 50	Cincinnati	Indiana
39 Cincinnati-Hamilton Road	State Route 9	US 127	Cincinnati	Hamilton
40 Cincinnati-Brookville Road	State Route 129	US 27, SR 126	Cincinnati	Indiana
41 Cincinnati-Batavia Road	State Route 74	SR 32	Cincinnati	Batavia
42 Harrison Road	State Route 130	US 52	Cincinnati	Indiana
43 Carthage-Hamilton Road	State Route 6	SR 4	Carthage	Hamilton
44 Hamilton-Cleves Road	State Route 128	SR 128	Hamilton	Cleves
45 Dunlap-Springdale Road	State Route 26	SR 126	Dunlap	Springdale
46 Glendale-Milford Road	State Route 26	SR 126	Glendale	Milford
47 Columbus-Newark Road	State Route 20	SR 16	Columbus	Newark
48 Columbus-Marysville Road	State Route 21	US 33	Columbus	Marysville
49 Columbus-Lancaster Road	State Route 21	US 33	Columbus	Lancaster
50 Columbus-Washington Court House Road	State Route 3	SR 3/US 62	Columbus	Washington Court House
51 Toledo-Napoleon Road	State Route 31	US 24	Toledo	Napoleon
52 Toledo-Elmore Road	State Route 2	SR 51	Toledo	Southeast of Woodville
53 Toledo-Perrysburg Road	State Route 6	SR 65	Toledo	Perrysburg
53 Toledo-Perrysburg Road	State Route 110	SR 65	Perrysburg	Grand Rapids
54 Toledo-Lansing Road	State Route 112	SR 51	Toledo	Michigan
55 Toledo-Ann Arbor Road	State Route 183	SR 246, Secor Road	Toledo	Michigan
56 Jerusalem Road	State Route 23	SR 2	Toledo	Bono
57 Perrysburg-Holland Road	State Route 102	US 20, Perrysburg Holland Road	Perrysburg	Holland
58 Holland-Sylvania Road	State Route 63	US 20, Holland Sylvania Road	Southeast of Holland	Sylvania
59 Waterville-Swanton Road	State Route 64	SR 64	Waterville	Swanton
60 Dayton-Springfield Road	State Route 52	SR 4	Dayton	Springfield
61 Dayton-Troy Road	State Route 6	US 25 (former)	Dayton	Troy
62 Dayton-Greenville Road	State Route 51	SR 49	Dayton	Greenville
63 Dayton-Covington Road	State Route 50	SR 48	Dayton	Covington (north of)
64 Dayton-Lebanon Road	State Route 50	SR 48	Dayton	Lebanon
65 Dayton-Germantown Road	State Route 52	SR 4	Dayton	Germantown
66 Akron-Canton Road	State Route 8	SR 8 (former)	Akron	Canton
67 Canton-Alliance Road	State Route 44	US 62	Canton	Louisville (north of)
67 Canton-Alliance Road	State Route 19	US 62, SR 193 (former)	Louisville (north of)	Alliance
68 Canton-Massillon Road	State Route 5	SR 172	Canton	Massillon
69 Massillon-Wooster Road	State Route 5	US 30, SR 172	Massillon	Wooster
70 Canton-Canal Dover Road	State Route 8	SR 800	Canton	New Philadelphia
71 Akron-Massillon Road	State Route 93	SR 93, SR 236	Akron	Massillon
72 Canton-New Franklin Road	State Route 5	SR 172	Canton	Osnaburg
72 Canton-New Franklin Road	State Route 172	SR 172	Osnaburg	New Franklin
73 Canton-Louisville Road	State Route 19	SR 153	Canton	Louisville
74 Ravenna-Louisville Road	State Route 44	SR 44	Ravenna	Louisville (north of)
74 Ravenna-Louisville Road	State Route 19	SR 44	Louisville (north of)	Louisville
75 Canton-Steubenville Road	State Route 43	SR 43	Canton	Waynesburg
75 Canton-Steubenville Road	State Route 171	SR 171	Waynesburg	Carrollton
75 Canton-Steubenville Road	State Route 43	SR 43	Carrollton	Steubenville
76 Alliance-Yale Road	State Route 80	SR 225	Alliance	East of Atwater Center
76 Alliance-Yale Road	State Route 225	SR 225 (former)	East of Atwater Center	Yale
77 Massillon-Canal Dover Road	State Route 13	SR 21	Massillon	Northwest of Strasburg
78 Alliance-Minerva Road	State Route 80	SR 183	Alliance	Minerva
79 Navarre-Berlin Road	State Route 19	US 62	Navarre	Berlin
80 Youngstown-Warren Road	State Route 16	US 422	Youngstown	Girard
80 Youngstown-Warren Road	State Route 169	US 422	Girard	Warren
81 Youngstown-Salem Road	State Route 19	US 62	Youngstown	Salem
82 Youngstown-Lisbon Road	State Route 164	SR 164, SR 7	Youngstown	Lisbon
83 Pittsburg-Youngstown Road	State Route 90	SR 170, SR 617	Pennsylvania	Youngstown
84 Alliance-Salem Road	State Route 19	US 62, SR 173 (former)	Alliance	Salem
85 Youngstown-New Bedford Road	State Route 16	US 422	Youngstown	Pennsylvania
86 Salem-Unity Road	State Route 14	SR 14	Salem	Unity
86 Salem-Unity Road	State Route 170	SR 14	Unity	Pennsylvania
87 Akron-Canfield Road	State Route 17	US 224	Akron	Canfield
88 Niles-Warren Road	State Route 16	SR 169	Girard	Warren
89 North Lima-East Palestine Road	State Route 165	SR 165	North Lima	Unity
89 North Lima-East Palestine Road	State Route 14	SR 165	Unity	East Palestine
90 Chagrin Falls-Willoughby Road	State Route 174	SR 174	Chagrin Falls	Willoughby
91 Cuyahoga Falls-Chagrin Falls Road	State Route 91	SR 91	Cuyahoga Falls	Solon
91 Cuyahoga Falls-Chagrin Falls Road	State Route 174	SR 174 (former)	Solon	Chagrin Falls
92 Akron-Cuyahoga Falls Road	State Route 36	SR 59	Akron	Cuyahoga Falls
93 Cuyahoga Falls-Kent Road	State Route 36	SR 59	Cuyahoga Falls	Kent
94 Akron-Kent Road	State Route 36	SR 261	Akron	Kent
95 Akron-Medina Road	State Route 18	SR 18	Akron	Medina
96 Akron-Wooster Road	State Route 36	SR 585	Akron	Wooster
97 Barberton-Greenwich Road	State Route 17	US 224	Barberton	Chicago Junction
98 Ghent Road	State Route 92	SR 176 (former)	Northwest of Akron	Ghent
99 High Ridge-Bellaire Road	State Route 214	SR 214 (former)	St. Clairsville (east of)	Bellaire
100 Bridgeport-Cadiz Road	State Route 13	US 250	Bridgeport	Cadiz
101 Barnesville-Hendrysburg Road	State Route 48	SR 800	Barnesville	Hendrysburg
102 Cadiz-St. Clairsville Road	State Route 35	SR 9	Cadiz	St. Clairsville
103 New Athens-Morristown Road	State Route 149	SR 149	New Athens	Morristown
104 Barnesville-Woodsfield Road	State Route 48	SR 800	Barnesville	Woodsfield
105 Barnesville-Powhatan Road	State Route 148	SR 148	Barnesville	Powhatan Point
106 St. Clairsville-Armstrong Mills Road	State Route 35	SR 9	St. Clairsville	Armstrongs Mills
107 Cambridge-Barnesville Road	State Route 148	SR 265	Cambridge	Barnesville
108 Malaga-Alledonia Road	State Route 35	SR 145	Malaga	Alledonia
109 Marion-Waldo Road	State Route 4	SR 423	Marion	Waldo
110 Marion-Bucyrus Road	State Route 4	SR 4	Marion	Bucyrus
111 Marion-Mount Gilead Road	State Route 42	SR 95	Marion	Mount Gilead
112 Marion-Kenton Road	State Route 10	SR 309	Kenton	Marion
113 Marion-Upper Sandusky Road	State Route 22	US 23, SR 199, SR 423	Marion	Upper Sandusky
114 Marion-Galion Road	State Route 10	SR 309	Marion	Galion
115 Marysville-Marion Road	State Route 38	SR 4	Marysville	Marion
116 Delaware-Prospect Road	State Route 203	SR 203	Delaware	North of Prospect
117 Richwood-Larue Road	State Route 47	SR 37	South of Richwood	LaRue
118 Larue-Marseilles Road	State Route 47	SR 37	LaRue	Marseilles
119 West Union-Portsmouth Road	State Route 25	SR 125	West Union	Portsmouth (west of)
120 West Union-Bradysville Road	State Route 41	SR 41, SR 136	West Union	Manchester
121 West Union-Wrightsville Road	State Route 137	SR 247	West Union	Wrightsville
122 West Union-Belfast Road	State Route 137	SR 247, SR 785	West Union	Belfast
123 Hillsboro-Portsmouth Road	State Route 73	SR 73	Hillsboro	Portsmouth (north of)
124 West Union-Sinking Spring Road	State Route 41	SR 41	West Union	Bainbridge
125 Batavia-Winchester Road	State Route 74	SR 32	Batavia	South of Seaman
126 Lima-Wapakoneta Road	State Route 6	US 25 (former)	Lima	Wapakoneta
127 Lima-Delphos Road	State Route 10	SR 309	Lima	Delphos
128 Lima-Kenton Road	State Route 10	SR 309	Lima	Kenton
129 Lima-Ottawa Road	State Route 33	SR 65	Lima	Ottawa
130 Lima-Bellefontaine Road	State Route 117	SR 117	Lima	North of Huntsville
130 Lima-Bellefontaine Road	State Route 32	US 33	North of Huntsville	Bellefontaine
131 Delphos-St. Marys Road	State Route 66	SR 66	Delphos	St. Marys
132 Lima-Spencerville Road	State Route 117	SR 117	Lima	Conant
132 Lima-Spencerville Road	State Route 116	SR 117	Conant	Spencerville
133 Findlay-Delphos Road	State Route 106	SR 12	Findlay	Vaughnsville
133 Findlay-Delphos Road	State Route 189	SR 12 (former)	Vaughnsville	Gomer
133 Findlay-Delphos Road	State Route 5	US 30	Gomer	Delphos
134 Kalida-Lima Road	State Route 115	SR 115	Kieferville	Lima
135 Van Wert-Spencerville Road	State Route 116	SR 116, SR 117	Van Wert	Spencerville
136 Delphos-Wapakoneta Road	State Route 117	SR 198 (former)	Delphos (south of)	Conant
136 Delphos-Wapakoneta Road	State Route 116	SR 198	Conant	Wapakoneta
137 Delphos-Kalida Road	State Route 106	SR 190	Delphos	Fort Jennings
137 Delphos-Kalida Road	State Route 190	SR 190	Fort Jennings	West of Kalida
138 Bluffton-Carey Road	State Route 103	SR 103	Bluffton	Carey
139 Ashland-Medina Road	State Route 55	US 42	Ashland	Medina
140 Mansfield-Ashland Road	State Route 5	US 42	Mansfield	Ashland
141 Ashland-Wooster Road	State Route 5	US 250	Ashland	Wooster
142 Ashland-Norwalk Road	State Route 60	SR 60/US 250	Ashland	Savannah
142 Ashland-Norwalk Road	State Route 180	US 250	Savannah	Fitchville
142 Ashland-Norwalk Road	State Route 30	SR 13/US 250	Fitchville	Norwalk
143 Ashland-Loudonville Road	State Route 60	SR 60	Ashland	Loudonville
144 Ashland-Oberlin Road	State Route 96	SR 58	Ashland	South of Sullivan
144 Ashland-Oberlin Road	State Route 58	SR 58	South of Sullivan	Oberlin
145 Mansfield-Millersburg Road	State Route 39	SR 39	Mansfield	Millersburg
146 Mansfield-Wooster Road	State Route 10	US 30, SR 430	Mansfield	Wooster
147 Hayesville-Nashville Road	State Route 179	SR 179	Hayesville	Nashville
148 Ashland-Shelby Road	State Route 96	SR 96	Ashland	Shelby
149 Savannah-Vermilion Road	State Route 60	SR 60	Savannah	Vermilion
150 Niles-Ashtabula Road	State Route 46	SR 46	Niles	Ashtabula
151 Jefferson-Andover Road	State Route 84	SR 307, Mells Road, Stanhope-Kelloggsville Road	Jefferson	West Andover
151 Jefferson-Andover Road	State Route 85	SR 85, US 6	West Andover	Pennsylvania
152 Jefferson-Geneva Road	State Route 84	SR 307	Jefferson	Geneva (south of)
153 Painesville-Warren Road	State Route 86	SR 86	Painesville	Windsor
153 Painesville-Warren Road	State Route 45	SR 45	Windsor	Warren
154 Windsor-Geneva Road	State Route 45	SR 534	Windsor	Geneva
155 Logan-Athens Road	State Route 21	US 33	Logan	Athens
156 Athens-Hockingport Road	State Route 144	SR 144, US 50	Athens	Hockingport
157 Athens-Marietta Road	State Route 26	SR 550	Athens	Marietta
158 New Lexington-Athens Road	State Route 30	SR 13	New Lexington	Chauncey
159 Athens-Pomeroy Road	State Route 21	US 33	Athens	Pomeroy
160 Athens-McArthur Road	State Route 26	US 50	Athens	McArthur
161 Pomeroy-Marietta Road	State Route 7	SR 7	Pomeroy	Little Hocking
162 McConnelsville-Athens Road	State Route 77	SR 377	McConnelsville	Sharpsburg
163 Middleport-McArthur Road	State Route 143	SR 143	Pomeroy	West of Albany
164 Sidney-Wapakoneta Road	State Route 6	US 25 (former)	Sidney	Wapakoneta
165 Wapakoneta-St. Marys Road	State Route 32	US 33	Wapakoneta	St. Marys
166 Kenton-Wapakoneta Road	State Route 67	SR 67	Wapakoneta	Kenton
167 St. Marys-Celina Road	State Route 32	SR 29, SR 703	St. Marys	Celina
168 Bellefontaine-Wapakoneta Road	State Route 32	US 33, SR 366	North of Huntsville	Wapakoneta
169 Sidney-St. Marys Road	State Route 54	SR 29	Sidney	St. Marys
170 Piqua-St. Marys Road	State Route 66	SR 66	Piqua	St. Marys
171 Fort Recovery-Minster Road	State Route 119	SR 119	Indiana	Minster
172 Minster-Sidney Road	State Route 119	SR 119	Minster	Northwest of Sidney
173 St. Marys-Fort Wayne Road	State Route 54	US 33	St. Marys	Indiana
174 Celina-Kossuth Road	State Route 197	SR 197	Celina	Kossuth
175 Georgetown-Wilmington Road	State Route 53	US 68	Georgetown	Wilmington
176 Georgetown-Ripley Road	State Route 221	US 68	Georgetown	Ripley
177 Ripley-Hillsboro Road	State Route 38	US 62	Ripley	Hillsboro
178 Georgetown-Higginsport Road	State Route 53	SR 221	Georgetown	Higginsport
179 Hamilton-Middletown Road	State Route 6	SR 4, SR 73	Hamilton	Franklin
180 Hamilton-Eaton Road	State Route 9	US 127	Hamilton	Eaton
181 Hamilton-Richmond Road	State Route 224	SR 177	Hamilton	Indiana
182 Oxford-Millville Road	State Route 126	US 27	Indiana	McGonigle
182 Oxford-Millville Road	State Route 223	US 27	McGonigle	Northeast of Ross
183 Old Oxford Road	State Route 126	SR 130	Hamilton	McGonigle
184 Eaton-Middletown Road	State Route 122	SR 122	Eaton	Middletown
185 Hamilton-Lebanon Road	State Route 125	SR 63	Hamilton (east of)	Lebanon
186 Middletown-Germantown Road	State Route 52	SR 4	Middletown	Germantown
187 Springfield-Urbana Road	State Route 53	US 68	Springfield	Urbana
188 Urbana-West Jefferson Road	State Route 29	SR 29	Urbana	West Jefferson
189 Urbana-Bellefontaine Road	State Route 53	US 68	Urbana	Bellefontaine
190 Piqua-Urbana Road	State Route 29	US 36	Piqua	Urbana
191 Urbana-Marysville Road	State Route 55	US 36	Urbana	Marysville
192 Urbana-Sidney Road	State Route 54	SR 29	Urbana	Sidney
193 Troy-Urbana Northern Road	State Route 202	Troy Urbana Road	Troy	Urbana
194 Urbana-London Road	State Route 56	SR 56	Urbana (east of)	London
195 Springfield-Xenia Road	State Route 53	US 68	Springfield	Xenia
196 Springfield-Troy Road	State Route 70	SR 41	Springfield	Troy
197 Springfield-Washington Court House Road	State Route 70	SR 41	Springfield	Washington Court House
198 Milton-Carlisle Road	State Route 71	SR 571	West Milton	Donnelsville
199 Bucyrus-Tiffin Road	State Route 62	SR 19	Bucyrus	Broken Sword
199 Bucyrus-Tiffin Road	State Route 100	SR 100	Broken Sword	Tiffin
200 Bucyrus-Upper Sandusky Road	State Route 5	US 30	Bucyrus	Upper Sandusky
201 Galion-Bucyrus Road	State Route 62	SR 19	Galion	Bucyrus
202 Mansfield-Galion Road	State Route 10	SR 309	Mansfield	Galion
203 Bucyrus-Crestline Road	State Route 5	US 30	Bucyrus	Crestline
204 Shelby-Galion Road	State Route 61	SR 61	Shelby	Galion
205 Plymouth-Bucyrus Road	State Route 98	SR 98	Plymouth	Bucyrus
206 Galion-Mount Gilead Road	State Route 61	SR 61	Galion	Mount Gilead
207 Crestline-Ontario Road	State Route 181	SR 181	Crestline	Ontario (west of)
208 Greenville-Covington Road	State Route 29	US 36	Greenville	Covington
209 Greenville-Milton Road	State Route 71	SR 571	Greenville	West Milton
210 Eaton-Greenville Road	State Route 9	US 127	Eaton	Greenville
211 Celina-Greenville Road	State Route 9	US 127	Celina	Greenville
212 Greenville-Union City Road	State Route 29	SR 571	Greenville	Union City
213 Greenville-Fort Recovery Road	State Route 51	SR 49	Greenville	Fort Recovery
214 Greenville-Versailles Road	State Route 121	SR 121	Greenville	Versailles
215 Greenville-New Paris Road	State Route 121	SR 121	Greenville	Indiana
216 Piqua-Versailles Road	State Route 120	SR 185	Piqua	Versailles
217 Sidney-Versailles Road	State Route 68	SR 47	Sidney	Versailles
218 Versailles-Brock Road	State Route 120	SR 185	Versailles	Brock
219 Findlay-Tiffin Road	State Route 106	US 224	Findlay	Tiffin
220 Findlay-Bowling Green Road	State Route 6	SR 25	Findlay	Bowling Green
221 Findlay-Kenton Road	State Route 21	US 68	Findlay	Kenton
222 Findlay-Upper Sandusky Road	State Route 22	SR 199, SR 568	Findlay	Upper Sandusky
223 Ottawa-Findlay Road	State Route 22	SR 15	Ottawa	Findlay
224 Baltimore-Fostoria Road	State Route 17	SR 18	Hoytville	Fostoria
225 Deshler-Findlay Road	State Route 17	SR 18	Deshler (west of)	Hoytville
225 Deshler-Findlay Road	State Route 186	SR 186, SR 235	Hoytville	Findlay (west of)
226 Bellefontaine-Kenton Road	State Route 53	US 68	Bellefontaine	Kenton
227 Kenton-Forest Road	State Route 53	SR 53	Kenton	Forest
228 Marysville-Kenton Road	State Route 21	SR 31	Marysville	Kenton
229 Kenton-Upper Sandusky Road	State Route 67	SR 67	Kenton	Upper Sandusky
230 Roundhead-Ada Road	State Route 69	SR 235	Roundhead	Ada
231 Ada-Forest Road	State Route 69	SR 81	Ada	Forest
232 Reservoir Road	State Route 69	SR 235	Roundhead	Lakeview
233 Forest-Upper Sandusky Road	State Route 53	SR 53	Forest	Upper Sandusky
234 Sidney-Bellefontaine Road	State Route 68	SR 47	Sidney	Bellefontaine
235 Marysville-Bellefontaine Road	State Route 32	US 33	Marysville	Bellefontaine
236 Bellefontaine-Richwood Road	State Route 68	SR 47	Bellefontaine	East of Richwood
237 Piqua-Sidney Road	State Route 6	US 25 (former)	Piqua	Sidney
238 Delaware-Marysville Road	State Route 55	US 36	Delaware	Marysville
239 Marysville-London Road	State Route 38	SR 38	Marysville	London
240 Richwood-Delaware Road	State Route 47	SR 37	South of Richwood	Delaware
241 Delaware-London Road	State Route 160	US 42	Delaware	London
242 Plain City-Dublin Road	State Route 161	SR 161	Plain City	Dublin (west of)
243 London-Circleville Road	State Route 56	SR 56	London	Circleville
244 Washington-London Road	State Route 38	SR 38	Bloomingburg (south of)	Bloomingburg
244 Washington-London Road	State Route 38	SR 38	Bloomingburg	London
245 Piqua-Troy Road	State Route 6	US 25 (former)	Piqua	Troy
246 Piqua-Covington Road	State Route 29	US 36	Piqua	Covington
247 Covington-Troy Road	State Route 70	SR 41	Covington	Troy
248 Wilmington-Xenia Road	State Route 53	US 68	Wilmington	Xenia
249 Eaton-Richmond Road	State Route 11	US 35	Eaton	Indiana
250 Franklin-Lebanon Road	State Route 123	SR 123	Franklin	Lebanon
251 Franklin-Wilmington Road	State Route 73	SR 73	Franklin	Wilmington
252 Lebanon-Morrow Road	State Route 123	SR 123	Lebanon	Morrow
253 Roachester-Blanchester Road	State Route 123	SR 123	Roachester	Blanchester
254 Wilmington-Hillsboro Road	State Route 73	SR 73	Wilmington	Hillsboro
255 Batavia-Owensville Road	State Route 132	SR 132	Batavia	Owensville
256 Batavia-New Richmond Road	State Route 132	SR 132	Batavia	New Richmond
257 Bethel-Chilo Road	State Route 133	SR 133, SR 222	Bethel	Chilo
258 Hillsboro-Chillicothe Road	State Route 26	US 50	Hillsboro	Chillicothe
259 Hillsboro-Washington Road	State Route 38	US 62	Hillsboro	Washington Court House
260 Hillsboro-Greenfield Road	State Route 138	SR 138	Hillsboro	Greenfield
261 Hillsboro-Piketon Road	State Route 24	SR 124	Hillsboro	Piketon
262 Celina-Van Wert Road	State Route 9	US 127	Celina	Van Wert
263 Fort Recovery-Willshire Road	State Route 51	SR 49	Fort Recovery	Willshire
264 Celina-Wabash Road	State Route 32	SR 29	Celina	Indiana
265 Van Wert-Rockford Road	State Route 118	SR 118	Van Wert	Rockford
266 Upper Sandusky-Tiffin Road	State Route 53	SR 53	Upper Sandusky	Tiffin
267 Upper Sandusky-Bellevue Road	State Route 67	SR 67, SR 18, SR 113	Upper Sandusky	Northeast of Bellevue
268 Fostoria-Carey Road	State Route 63	US 23	Fostoria	Carey
269 Fremont-Tiffin Road	State Route 53	SR 53	Fremont	Tiffin
270 Tiffin-Fostoria Road	State Route 17	SR 18	Tiffin	Fostoria
271 Tiffin-Bellevue Road	State Route 101	SR 101	Tiffin	South of Clyde
271 Tiffin-Bellevue Road	State Route 229	SR 113 (former)	South of Clyde	Bellevue
272 Tiffin-New Haven Road	State Route 17	US 224	Tiffin	Chicago Junction
273 Perrysburg-Fostoria Road	State Route 63	SR 199	Perrysburg	Fostoria
274 Fremont-Bellevue Road	State Route 2	US 20	Fremont	Bellevue
275 Fremont-Perrysburg Road	State Route 2	US 20	Fremont	Southeast of Woodville
275 Fremont-Perrysburg Road	State Route 102	US 20	Southeast of Woodville	Perrysburg
276 Sandusky-Clyde Road	State Route 101	SR 101	Sandusky	Clyde (south of)
277 Fremont-Port Clinton Road	State Route 53	SR 53	Fremont	Port Clinton
278 Fremont-Bowling Green Road	State Route 34	US 6	Fremont	Bowling Green
279 Bowling Green-Port Clinton Road	State Route 105	SR 105	Bowling Green	Oak Harbor
279 Bowling Green-Port Clinton Road	State Route 163	SR 163	Oak Harbor	Port Clinton
280 Fremont-Oak Harbor Road	State Route 62	SR 19	Fremont	Oak Harbor
281 Fremont-Castalia Road	State Route 34	SR 412	Fremont	Castalia
282 Bowling Green-Perrysburg Road	State Route 6	SR 25	Bowling Green	Perrysburg
283 Bowling Green-Waterville Road	State Route 64	SR 64	Bowling Green	Waterville
284 Grand Rapids-Bowling Green Road	State Route 184	SR 110 (former)	Grand Rapids	Bowling Green (north of)
285 Ottawa-Grand Rapids Road	State Route 65	SR 65	Ottawa	McClure
285 Ottawa-Grand Rapids Road	State Route 185	SR 65	McClure	North of McClure
285 Ottawa-Grand Rapids Road	State Route 110	SR 110	North of McClure	Grand Rapids
285 Ottawa-Grand Rapids Road	State Route 184	SR 295	Grand Rapids	Grand Rapids (north of)
286 Bowling Green-Napoleon Road	State Route 34	US 6	Bowling Green	Napoleon
287 Mansfield-Norwalk Road	State Route 30	SR 13	Mansfield	Fitchville
288 Milan-Elyria Road	State Route 61	SR 113	Milan	Berlinville
288 Milan-Elyria Road	State Route 59	SR 113	Berlinville	Elyria
289 Bellevue-Norwalk Road	State Route 2	US 20	Bellevue	Norwalk
290 Oberlin-Norwalk Road	State Route 2	US 20, SR 511	Oberlin	Norwalk
291 Medina-Norwalk Road	State Route 18	SR 18	Medina	Norwalk
292 Plymouth-Norwalk Road	State Route 61	SR 61	Plymouth	Norwalk
293 New London-Fitchville Road	State Route 162	SR 162	New London	Fitchville
294 Sandusky-Norwalk Road	State Route 30	US 250	Sandusky	Norwalk
295 Barnesville-Bellaire Road	State Route 147	SR 147	Barnesville	Bellaire
296 Wauseon-Napoleon Road	State Route 33	SR 108	Wauseon	Napoleon
297 Bryan-Wauseon Road	State Route 2	SR 2	Bryan	Wauseon
298 Wauseon-Morenci Road	State Route 33	SR 108	Wauseon	Michigan
299 Liberty-Adrian Road	State Route 65	SR 109	McClure (west of)	Michigan
300 Swanton-Metamora Road	State Route 64	SR 64	Swanton	Michigan
301 Archbold-Fayette Road	State Route 66	SR 66, US 127	Archbold	Michigan
302 Archbold-Defiance Road	State Route 66	SR 66	Archbold	Defiance
303 West Unity-Montpelier Road	State Route 107	SR 107, US 20A	Burlington	Montpelier (west of)
304 Bryan-Fort Wayne Road	State Route 108	SR 2	Bryan	Hicksville
304 Bryan-Fort Wayne Road	State Route 17	SR 2	Hicksville	Indiana
305 Bryan-Defiance Road	State Route 9	SR 15	Bryan	Ney
305 Bryan-Defiance Road	State Route 22	SR 15	Ney	Defiance
306 Bryan-Pioneer Road	State Route 9	SR 15	Bryan	Michigan
307 Bryan-West Unity Road	State Route 108	US 127	Bryan	Alvordton (east of)
308 Bryan-Edon Road	State Route 34	SR 34	Bryan	Indiana
309 Bryan-Edgerton Road	State Route 2	US 6	Bryan	Indiana
310 Bryan-Napoleon Road	State Route 34	SR 34, US 6	Bryan	Napoleon
311 Edon-Cooney Road	State Route 107	SR 49	Edon	Michigan
312 Stryker-Evansport Road	State Route 191	SR 191	Stryker	Evansport (east of)
313 Oberlin-Elyria Road	State Route 2	US 20, SR 511	Oberlin	Elyria
314 Medina-Elyria Road	State Route 57	SR 57	Medina	Elyria
315 Elyria-Lorain Road	State Route 57	SR 57	Elyria	Lorain
316 Napoleon-Defiance Road	State Route 31	US 24	Napoleon	Defiance
317 Ottawa-Napoleon Road	State Route 33	SR 109, SR 108, CR 10A	Ottawa	Napoleon
318 Defiance-Holgate Road	State Route 17	SR 18	Defiance	East of Holgate
319 Napoleon-Deshler Road	State Route 17	SR 18	East of Holgate	Deshler (west of)
320 Holgate-Kieferville Road	State Route 115	SR 115 (former), SR 108	North of Holgate	Kieferville
321 Medina-Wadsworth Road	State Route 57	SR 57	Medina	Wadsworth
322 Ravenna-Warren Road	State Route 36	SR 5	Ravenna	Warren
323 Kent-Ravenna Road	State Route 36	SR 59	Kent	Ravenna
324 Painesville-Ravenna Road	State Route 44	SR 44	Painesville	Ravenna
325 Warren-Burton Road	State Route 16	US 422	Warren	Parkman
325 Warren-Burton Road	State Route 87	SR 168	Parkman	Burton
326 Ravenna-Parkman Road	State Route 88	SR 88	Ravenna	Parkman
327 Chardon-Madison Road	State Route 85	US 6	Chardon	Hambden
327 Chardon-Madison Road	State Route 166	SR 166, SR 528	Hambden	Madison
328 Canfield-Niles Road	State Route 46	SR 46	Canfield	Niles
329 Warren-Sharon Road	State Route 82	SR 82	Warren	Sharon, PA
330 Warren-Meadville Road	State Route 36	SR 5	Warren	Pennsylvania
331 Youngstown-Sharon Road	State Route 19	US 62	Youngstown	Sharon, PA
332 Delaware-Mount Gilead Road	State Route 55	US 42	Delaware	Mount Gilead
333 Mount Gilead-Mount Vernon Road	State Route 42	SR 95, SR 13	Mount Gilead	Mount Vernon
334 Mount Gilead-Mansfield Road	State Route 55	US 42	Mount Gilead	Mansfield
335 Mount Gilead-Sunbury Road	State Route 61	SR 61	Mount Gilead	Sunbury
336 Delaware-Newark Road	State Route 47	SR 37	Delaware	Newark (west of)
337 Newark-Mount Vernon Road	State Route 30	SR 13	Newark	Mount Vernon
338 Mount Vernon-Mansfield Road	State Route 30	SR 13	Mount Vernon (north of)	Mansfield
339 Mount Vernon-Coshocton Road	State Route 42	US 36, SR 715	Mount Vernon	Coshocton
340 Danville-Jelloway Road	State Route 205	SR 205	Danville	Jelloway
341 Millersburg-Canal Dover Road	State Route 39	SR 39	Millersburg	Canal Dover
342 Millersburg-Wooster Road	State Route 76	SR 83	Millersburg	Wooster
343 Killbuck Road	State Route 76	SR 60	Coshocton (west of)	Killbuck
344 Zanesville-Dresden Road	State Route 77	SR 60	Zanesville	Trinway
345 Zanesville-McConnelsville Road	State Route 77	SR 60, SR 376	Zanesville	McConnelsville
346 Newark-Zanesville Road	State Route 156	SR 146	Newark (east of)	Zanesville (north of)
347 Newark-Coshocton Road	State Route 20	SR 16	Newark	Coshocton
348 Zanesville-Caldwell Road	State Route 146	SR 146, SR 215 (former)	Zanesville	Caldwell (north of)
349 Cambridge-Coshocton Road	State Route 209	SR 209	Cambridge	Bloomfield
349 Cambridge-Coshocton Road	State Route 76	SR 83	Bloomfield	Coshocton
350 Zanesville-New Lexington Road	State Route 75	SR 93	Zanesville (south of)	New Lexington (east of)
351 Zanesville-Otsego Road	State Route 75	SR 93	Zanesville	Otsego
352 Cambridge-Newcomerstown Road	State Route 8	US 21 (former)	Cambridge	Newcomerstown
353 Cambridge-Caldwell Road	State Route 8	SR 821	Cambridge	Caldwell
354 McConnelsville-New Lexington Road	State Route 37	SR 37	McConnelsville	New Lexington
355 Logan-New Lexington Road	State Route 75	SR 93	Logan	New Lexington
356 Newark-New Lexington Road	State Route 30	SR 13	Newark	New Lexington
357 Lancaster-New Lexington Road	State Route 37	SR 37	Lancaster	New Lexington
358 Shawnee-Corning Road	State Route 216	SR 155	Shawnee	Corning
359 Lancaster-Newark Road	State Route 79	SR 79, SR 37	Lancaster	Newark
360 Logan-Lancaster Road	State Route 21	US 33	Logan	Lancaster
361 Chillicothe-Lancaster Road	State Route 159	SR 159	Chillicothe (north of)	Lancaster (south of)
362 Circleville-Adelphi Road	State Route 56	SR 56	Circleville	Adelphi
363 Chillicothe-Logan Road	State Route 27	SR 180	Chillicothe (north of)	Logan (west of)
364 Chillicothe-Jackson Road	State Route 11	US 35	Chillicothe	Jackson
365 Chillicothe-McArthur Road	State Route 26	US 50	Chillicothe	McArthur
366 Jackson-Piketon Road	State Route 24	SR 124	Jackson	Piketon
367 Waverly-Zahn's Corner Road	State Route 220	SR 220	Waverly	Zahn's Corner
368 Lisbon-Canton Southern Road	State Route 5	US 30	Lisbon	Minerva (east of)
368 Lisbon-Canton Southern Road	State Route 226	unbuilt	Minerva (east of)	Minerva (north of)
369 Minerva-Sandyville Road	State Route 5	US 30	Minerva (east of)	Minerva
369 Minerva-Sandyville Road	State Route 155	SR 183	Minerva	Sandyville
370 Dennison-Cadiz Road	State Route 13	US 250	Dennison	Cadiz
371 Cadiz-Carrollton Road	State Route 35	SR 9	Cadiz	Carrollton
372 Dennison-Scio Road	State Route 212	SR 151	Dennison (east of)	Bowerston
372 Dennison-Scio Road	State Route 151	SR 151	Bowerston	Jewett (west of)
372 Dennison-Scio Road	State Route 227	New Rumley Road	Jewett (west of)	Jewett (southwest of)
373 Jewett-Hopedale Road	State Route 151	Old Jewett Road	Jewett (west of)	Jewett
373 Jewett-Hopedale Road	State Route 151	SR 151	Jewett	Hopedale
374 Dell Roy-Bowerston Road	State Route 151	SR 212	Dellroy	Bowerston
375 Carrollton-Kensington Road	State Route 35	SR 9	Carrollton	Kensington
376 Carrollton-Canal Dover Road	State Route 20	SR 39	Carrollton	Canal Dover
377 Carrollton-Salineville Road	State Route 20	SR 39	Carrollton	Salineville
378 Skelley-Empire Road	State Route 152	SR 152	Skelley	Empire
379 Mingo-Smithfield Road	State Route 151	SR 151	Mingo Junction	Hopedale
380 Mount Pleasant-Rayland Road	State Route 150	SR 150	Mount Pleasant (west of)	Rayland
381 Salineville-Yellow Creek Road	State Route 20	SR 39	Salineville	Wellsville
382 Lisbon-Salineville Road	State Route 164	SR 164	Lisbon	Salineville
383 Lisbon-East Palestine Road	State Route 154	SR 517, SR 558	Lisbon	East Palestine
383 Lisbon-East Palestine Road	State Route 14	SR 165	East Palestine	Pennsylvania
384 Salem-Hanoverton Road	State Route 35	SR 9	Salem	Hanoverton
385 Woodsfield-Clarington Road	State Route 78	SR 78	Woodsfield	Clarington
386 Caldwell-Woodsfield Road	State Route 78	SR 78, SR 145, SR 724	Caldwell	Woodsfield
387 Woodsfield-Sistersville Road	State Route 48	SR 800	Woodsfield	Fly
388 Lower Salem-Jerles Road	State Route 145	SR 145	Lower Salem	Jerles
389 Woodsfield-Marietta Road	State Route 26	SR 26	Woodsfield	Marietta
390 Caldwell-McConnelsville Road	State Route 78	SR 78	Caldwell	McConnelsville
391 Caldwell-Marietta Road	State Route 8	SR 821	Caldwell	Marietta
392 Caldwell-Barnesville Road	State Route 147	SR 147	Caldwell (east of)	Barnesville (west of)
393 Marietta-McConnelsville Road	State Route 37	SR 60	Marietta	McConnelsville
394 Pomeroy-Portland Road	State Route 24	SR 124, US 33	Pomeroy	West Virginia
395 Pomeroy-Jackson Road	State Route 24	SR 124	Pomeroy	Jackson
396 McArthur-Jackson Road	State Route 75	SR 93	McArthur	Jackson
397 McArthur-Logan Road	State Route 75	SR 93	McArthur	Logan
398 Gallipolis-McArthur Road	State Route 142	SR 160	Gallipolis	McArthur (south of)
399 Jackson-Gallipolis Road	State Route 11	US 35	Jackson	Gallipolis
400 Jackson-Ironton Road	State Route 75	SR 93	Jackson	Ironton
401 Oak Hill-Cadmus Road	State Route 141	SR 233	Oak Hill	Cadmus
402 Oak Hill-Portsmouth Road	State Route 140	SR 140	Oak Hill	Portsmouth (east of)
403 Jackson-Portsmouth Road	State Route 139	SR 139	Jackson	Portsmouth
404 Ironton-Miller Road	State Route 141	SR 141	Ironton	Ironton (east of)
404 Ironton-Miller Road	State Route 217	SR 217	Ironton (east of)	Miller
405 Gallipolis-Ironton Road	State Route 141	SR 141	Gallipolis	Ironton (east of)
406 Portsmouth-Lucasville Western Road	State Route 73	SR 73	Portsmouth	Portsmouth (north of)
406 Portsmouth-Lucasville Western Road	State Route 104	SR 104	Portsmouth (north of)	Lucasville (west of)
406 Portsmouth-Lucasville Western Road	State Route 104	SR 348	Lucasville (west of)	Lucasville
407 Newcomerstown-Coshocton Road	State Route 20	US 36	Newcomerstown	Coshocton
408 West Lafayette-New Philadelphia Road	State Route 75	SR 751	West Lafayette	Stone Creek
408 West Lafayette-New Philadelphia Road	State Route 20	US 21 (former)	Stone Creek	New Philadelphia (west of)
409 Canal Dover-New Philadelphia Western Road	State Route 211	SR 211 (former)	Canal Dover	New Philadelphia (west of)
409 Canal Dover-New Philadelphia Western Road	State Route 20	US 21 (former)	New Philadelphia (west of)	New Philadelphia
410 Marquand Mills-Newcomerstown Road	State Route 75	SR 93, CR 106	Marquand Mills	Newcomerstown (west of)
411 Walhonding-Newark Road	State Route 79	SR 79	Walhonding	Fallsburg (east of)
411 Walhonding-Newark Road	State Route 207	SR 668 (former)	Fallsburg (east of)	Newark (east of)
412 New Philadelphia-Uhrichsville Road	State Route 8	US 250	New Philadelphia	Uhrichsville
413 Newcomerstown-Uhrichsville Road	State Route 8	US 36	Newcomerstown	Uhrichsville
414 Wooster-Canal Dover Road	State Route 95	US 250	Wooster	Strasburg (north of)
414 Wooster-Canal Dover Road	State Route 13	SR 21	Strasburg (north of)	Canal Dover
415 Newcomerstown-Stone Creek Road	State Route 20	US 21 (former)	Newcomerstown	Stone Creek
416 Orrville-Wooster Road	State Route 177	McQuaid Road	Orrville	Wooster (east of)
417 Orrville Northern Road	State Route 94	SR 57	Orrville	Easton
418 Van Wert-Delphos Road	State Route 5	US 30	Van Wert	Delphos
419 Van Wert-Fort Wayne Road	State Route 5	US 30	Van Wert	Indiana
420 Hicksville-Defiance Road	State Route 17	SR 18	Hicksville	Defiance
421 Ottawa-Defiance Road	State Route 22	SR 15	Ottawa	Defiance
422 Defiance-Fort Wayne Road	State Route 31	US 24	Defiance	Indiana
423 Defiance-Paulding Road	State Route 111	SR 111	Defiance	Paulding
424 Paulding-Bryan Road	State Route 9	US 127	Paulding	Ney
425 Defiance-Delphos Road	State Route 66	SR 66	Defiance	Delphos
426 Defiance-Auburn Road	State Route 22	SR 249	Ney	Indiana
427 Payne-Hicksville Road	State Route 108	SR 49	Convoy (north of)	Hicksville
428 Hicksville-Auburn Road	State Route 193	SR 18	Hicksville	Indiana
429 Paulding-Payne Road	State Route 194	SR 500	Paulding	Payne
430 Van Wert-Paulding Road	State Route 9	US 127	Van Wert	Paulding
431 Continental-Paulding Road	State Route 113	SR 613	Continental (east of)	Paulding (south of)
432 Paulding-Fort Wayne Road	State Route 111	SR 613	Payne	Indiana
433 Paulding-Woodburn Road	State Route 111	SR 111	Paulding	Payne (north of)
434 Van Wert-Decatur Road	State Route 109	US 224	Van Wert	Indiana
435 Van Wert-Ottawa Road	State Route 109	US 224	Van Wert	Ottawa
436 Shelby-Mansfield Road	State Route 39	SR 39	Shelby	Mansfield
437 Shelby-Plymouth Road	State Route 61	SR 61	Shelby	Plymouth
438 Bono-Port Clinton Road	State Route 23	SR 2	Bono	Port Clinton
439 Oak Harbor-Genoa Road	State Route 163	SR 163	Oak Harbor	Genoa
440 Port Clinton-Marblehead Road	State Route 163	SR 163	Port Clinton	Marblehead
441 West Union-Hillsboro Road	State Route 136	SR 136	West Union (west of)	Hillsboro (south of)
442 Steubenville-Hammondsville Road	State Route 213	SR 213	Steubenville	Knoxville
442 Steubenville-Hammondsville Road	State Route 152	SR 213	Knoxville	Yellow Creek
443 Gambier-New Castle Road	State Route 206	SR 229	Mount Vernon	Newcastle
444 Dorset-Richmond Center Road	State Route 167	SR 167 (former)	Dorset	Pennsylvania
445 Dayton-Valley Road	State Route 69	SR 235	Dayton	East of Brandt
446 Richmond Road	State Route 175	SR 175	Bedford	Euclid (east of)
447 Burton-Bloomfield Road	State Route 168	SR 87	Burton	North Bloomfield
448 Roundhead-McGuffey Road	State Route 195	SR 195	Roundhead (north of)	McGuffey (north of)
449 Tiffin-Republic Road	State Route 106	SR 18	Tiffin	Republic
450 Roscoe Southern Road	State Route 210	SR 16	Roscoe	Coshocton (south of)
451 Wilmington-Sardinia Road	State Route 134	SR 134	Wilmington	Sardinia
452 Nicholsville-Felicity Road	State Route 222	SR 222	Nicholsville (north of)	Felicity
453 Columbus-Chillicothe Western Road	State Route 104	SR 104	Columbus	Chillicothe
454 Jeromeville-Sullivan Road	State Route 58	SR 89	Mohicanville	South of Sullivan
455 Monroeville-Chicago Junction Road	State Route 99	SR 99	Monroeville	Chicago Junction
456 Bryan-Evansport Road	State Route 192	SR 192 (former)	Bryan	Evansport (north of)
457 Toledo-Napoleon Road	State Route 110	SR 110	Napoleon	North of McClure
458 Felicity Southern Road	State Route 222	SR 133	Felicity	Utopia (west of)
459 Allensburg-Lynchburg Road	State Route 135	SR 135	Allensburg	Lynchburg
460 Cleveland-Kent Road	State Route 82	SR 43	Cleveland	Aurora
460 Cleveland-Kent Road	State Route 89	SR 43	Aurora	Suffield
461 Baltimore-Reynoldsburg Road	State Route 204	SR 256	Baltimore	Reynoldsburg
462 Lancaster-Kirkersville Road	State Route 158	SR 158	Lancaster	Kirkersville
463 Lancaster-Circleville Northern Road	State Route 158	SR 188	Lancaster	Circleville
464 Beamsville-Versailles Road	State Route 199	SR 242 (former)	Beamsville	Versailles
465 Orrville Southern Road	State Route 94	SR 57	Orrville	Dalton (west of)
466 Solon-Willoughby Road	State Route 91	SR 91	Solon	Willoughby
467 Hamilton-Scipio Road	State Route 127	SR 129	Hamilton	Scipio
468 Versailles Western Road	State Route 68	SR 47	Versailles	Dawn
469 Harrisburg-Westville Road	State Route 173	US 62	Harrisburg	Beloit (south of)
470 Millersport-Mount Perry Road	State Route 204	SR 204	Millersport (west of)	Mount Perry (south of)
471 Troy-Urbana Southern Road	State Route 55	SR 55	Troy	Urbana
472 Springfield-Jamestown Road	State Route 72	SR 72	Springfield	Jamestown
473 Jamestown-Hillsboro Road	State Route 72	SR 72	Jamestown	Hillsboro (north of)
474 Aurora-Warren Road	State Route 82	SR 82	Aurora	Warren (west of)
475 Hambden-Andover Road	State Route 85	US 6	Hambden	Andover
476 Ashtabula-Sheffield Road	State Route 83	SR 84	Ashtabula	Pennsylvania
477 Coshocton-Plainfield-Cambridge Road	State Route 42	SR 541	Coshocton	Kimbolton
478 Ganges-Plymouth Road	State Route 178	SR 603, Ganges 5 Points Road	Ganges (south of)	Plymouth
479 Newark-Fallsburg Road	State Route 79	SR 79	Newark	Fallsburg (east of)
480 Williamsburg-Owensville Road	State Route 132	SR 276	Williamsburg	Owensville
481 Washington-Bloomingburg Road	State Route 38	SR 38 (former)	Washington Court House	Bloomingburg
482 St. Marys-Monticello Road	State Route 198	SR 116	St. Marys	Monticello (north of)
483 Bellville-Lexington Road	State Route 97	SR 97	Bellville	Lexington
484 McConnelsville-Cambridge Road	State Route 215	SR 83, SR 146	McConnelsville (east of)	Cambridge (south of)
485 Bucyrus-Clyde Road	State Route 62	SR 19	Broken Sword	North of Republic
485 Bucyrus-Clyde Road	State Route 228	SR 228	North of Republic	Southwest of Clyde
486 Canfield-Poland Road	State Route 17	US 224	Canfield	Pennsylvania
487 Dayton-Troy Eastern Road	State Route 202	SR 202	Dayton	Troy
488 Lisbon-Wellsville Road	State Route 153	SR 45	Lisbon (south of)	Wellsville
489 Carrollton-Malvern Road	State Route 43	SR 43	Carrollton (north of)	Malvern
490 Bucyrus-Nevada-Upper Sandusky Road	State Route 182	SR 182 (former)	Bucyrus	Upper Sandusky
491 Holgate-Miller City Road	State Route 188	SR 108	Holgate	Miller City (south of)
492 Middleport-Bradbury Road	State Route 143	Bradbury Road	Middleport	East of Rutland
493 Road	State Route 5	US 30	Osnaburg	Minerva
494 Road	State Route 131	SR 131	Milford	Vera Cruz
495 Road	State Route 230	SR 230 (former)	Fremont (southwest of)	Fremont (west of)
496 Road	State Route 196	SR 196	New Hampshire	Westminster
497 Road	State Route 54	SR 54	South Charleston	Urbana
498 Road	State Route 200	US 36	Greenville (south of)	Indiana
499 Road	State Route 176	SR 176	Richfield	Cleveland
500 Road	State Route 170	SR 170	Unity	Petersburg
501 Mansfield-Crestline Road	State Route 5	US 30	Mansfield	Crestline
502 Youngstown-East Liverpool Road	State Route 7	SR 7, SR 164	East Liverpool	Youngstown
503 Road	State Route 187	SR 613	Leipsic	McComb
504 Road	State Route 104	SR 104	Lucasville (west of)	Waverly
505 Road	State Route 78	SR 78	Glouster	McConnelsville
506 Road	State Route 48	SR 800	West of Hendrysburg	Dennison
507 Road	State Route 157	SR 79	Lakeside	Hebron (east of)
508 Road	State Route 218	SR 218, SR 553	Crown City	Gallipolis (south of)
509 Road	State Route 219	SR 243 (former)	Proctorville	Athalia (south of)
510 Road	State Route 106	SR 189	Fort Jennings	Vaughnsville
511 Canton-Navarre Road	State Route 19	US 62 (former)	Canton	Navarre
512 Road	State Route 5	US 30	Gomer	Upper Sandusky
513 Road	State Route 76	SR 83	New Concord	Bloomfield
514 Road	State Route 80	SR 183, SR 700, Rock Spring Road	Atwater Center	Welshfield
515 Road	State Route 62	SR 19	North of Republic	Fremont
516 Salem-Warren Road	State Route 45	SR 45	Salem	Warren
517 Road	State Route 114	SR 114	Indiana	Mandale
518 Road	State Route 216	SR 216, SR 78	Nelsonville	New Straitsville
519 Road	State Route 208	SR 208	Dresden	Adamsville
	State Route 59	SR 61	Norwalk	Berlinville
	State Route 61	SR 61	Berlinville	Ceylon
	State Route 84	SR 307	Madison (south of)	Geneva (south of)
	State Route 89	SR 43	Suffield	Canton
	State Route 166	SR 528	Madison	North Madison
	State Route 175	SR 283	Euclid	Painesville
	State Route 231	SR 231	Nevada	Nevada (north of)
