= U.S. Route 20A =

U.S. Route 20A may refer to:

- U.S. Route 20A (New York)
- U.S. Route 20A (Ohio)
