= Ohio State Route 576 =

State highway in Williams County, Ohio, US

State Route 576

Route information
- Maintained by ODOT
- Length: 20.50 mi (32.99 km)
- Existed: 1937–present

Major junctions
- South end: SR 2 in Williams Center
- US 6 in Williams Center; US 20 near Montpelier
- North end: Hillsdale Road at the Michigan state line near Pioneer

Location
- Country: United States
- State: Ohio
- Counties: Williams

Highway system
- Ohio State Highway System; Interstate; US; State; Scenic
← SR 575	→ SR 577

State Route 576 (SR 576) is a north–south state highway located in northwestern Ohio, a U.S. state. The highway's southern terminus is at SR 2 on the boundary between Williams and Defiance Counties, approximately 3.25 miles (5.23 km) southwest of Bryan. The northern terminus of SR 576 is at the Michigan state line about 5.50 miles (8.85 km) northwest of Pioneer, where the roadway continuing into Hillsdale County, Michigan is county-maintained S. Hillsdale Road.

== Route description ==
The entirety of SR 576 is situated within Williams County. No segment of this state highway is included within the National Highway System, a network of routes determined to be the most important for the economy, mobility and defense of the nation.

== History ==
When it debuted in 1937, SR 576's routing occupied the portion of its existing alignment between its present southern terminus at SR 2 southwest of Bryan and its eastern junction with SR 107 in Montpelier. At that time, the current stretch of SR 576 between the western SR 107 junction and the eastern US 20 intersection was included as a portion of US 20A, while the stretch between US 20 and the Michigan state line was designated as SR 571.

By 1957, SR 576 took on the shape that it has today, when it was extended northerly out of Montpelier concurrent with US 20A to US 20, then west along US 20 a short distance, and north over the former SR 571 to its present northern terminus at the Michigan state line. The US 20A concurrency between Montpelier and US 20 was removed from SR 576 by 1964 when the alternate route to US 20 was re-routed to mainline US 20 via SR 15 to the east.

== Major intersections ==
The entire route is in Williams County.

Location	mi	km	Destinations	Notes
Center Township	0.00	0.00	SR 2 (Bryan Street)	
Center Township	1.01	1.63	US 6 – Napoleon	
Center Township	4.33	6.97	SR 34 – Blakeslee, Edon, Bryan	
Montpelier	11.37	18.30	SR 107 east (East Main Street) to Ohio Turnpike	Southern end of SR 107 concurrency
Montpelier	11.58	18.64	SR 107 west (West Main Street) / South Monroe Street	Northern end of SR 107 concurrency
Bridgewater Township	15.54	25.01	US 20 east – Fayette	Southern end of US 20 concurrency
Bridgewater Township	16.54	26.62	US 20 west – Angola	Northern end of US 20 concurrency
Bridgewater Township	20.50	32.99	Hillsdale Road – Hillsdale	Michigan state line
1.000 mi = 1.609 km; 1.000 km = 0.621 mi: Concurrency terminus
