= Ohio State Route 613 =

State highway in northwestern Ohio, US

State Route 613

Route information
- Maintained by ODOT
- Length: 75.95 mi (122.23 km)
- Existed: 1970–present

Major junctions
- West end: State Line Road (C-1) near Payne
- US 127 in Latty; I-75 near Van Buren
- East end: US 23 in Fostoria

Location
- Country: United States
- State: Ohio
- Counties: Paulding, Putnam, Hancock, Seneca

Highway system
- Ohio State Highway System; Interstate; US; State; Scenic
← SR 612	→ SR 614

State Route 613 (SR 613) is an east–west state highway in the northwestern portion of the U.S. state of Ohio. Its western terminus is at the Indiana state line 4 miles (6.4 km) west of Payne (the route once continued west in Indiana as State Road 14), and its eastern terminus is at US 23 in Fostoria.

== Route description ==
From the Indiana state line, State Route 613 follows a generally easterly direction through small towns such as Payne, Oakwood, and Continental. It shares a route with State Route 634 for 2 miles (3.2 km) before entering Continental. After Continental, the route continues east into Leipsic, then into McComb.

It continues in an eastern direction, drifting north, through Van Buren, until it meets State Route 18 south of Bloomdale. State Route 613 and State Route 18 run concurrently for 10 miles (16 km), heading into Fostoria. When the routes meet up with US 23 and SR 199 in Fostoria, SR 18 continues south along US 23 and SR 199 while SR 613 ends.

== History ==
- 1970 – Original route certified; no significant changes since its certification; routed along a previous alignment of State Route 113, which carries the following history:
  - 1926 – Indiana state line to Payne routed along the former alignment of State Route 111, and from Payne to 3¼ miles west of Leipsic along a previously unnumbered road.
  - 1932 – Extended east to McComb along a previously unnumbered road from 3¼ miles west of Leipsic to Leipsic, and along the former alignment of State Route 187 from Leipsic to McComb.
  - 1935 – Extended to 10 miles (16 km) west of Fostoria along a previously unnumbered road.
  - 1938 – Co-signed with State Route 18 (formerly State Route 17 before 1926) from 10 miles (16 km) west of Fostoria to Fostoria.

=== From 1938 to 1943 ===
- 1938 – Routed from 3 miles (4.8 km) south of Bedford to Bedford Heights along a previously and currently unnumbered road.
- 1943 – Entire route certified as State Route 175 (this segment decertified in 1968).

In Fostoria, SR 613 formerly continued east of US 23 and SR 199 along North Avenue and North Poplar Street before ending at SR 12. In 2012, the City of Fostoria and ODOT proposed removing this segment of SR 613 from the state highway system due to the narrow streets with the aim of reducing truck traffic through the city.

== Major intersections ==
County	Location	mi	km	Destinations	Notes
Paulding		0.00	0.00	State Line Road	Indiana state line
Paulding	Payne	4.00	6.44	SR 49 south / SR 500 west	Western end of SR 49/SR 500 concurrency
Paulding	Payne	4.13	6.65	SR 49 north	Eastern end of SR 49 concurrency
Paulding		6.08	9.78	SR 500 east	Eastern end of SR 500 concurrency
Paulding	Latty	12.54	20.18	US 127	
Paulding		17.59	28.31	SR 637	
Paulding	Oakwood	22.59	36.36	SR 66 south	Western end of SR 66 concurrency
Paulding	Oakwood	22.81	36.71	SR 66 north	Eastern end of SR 66 concurrency
Putnam		26.77	43.08	SR 634 south	Western end of SR 634 concurrency
Putnam	Continental	28.67	46.14	SR 634 north	Eastern end of SR 66 concurrency
Putnam		32.07	51.61	SR 15	
Putnam	Miller City	35.81	57.63	SR 108	
Putnam		40.77	65.61	SR 109	
Putnam	Leipsic	43.97	70.76	SR 65	
Hancock	McComb	54.84	88.26	SR 235 south	Western end of SR 235 concurrency
Hancock	McComb	55.24	88.90	SR 186 south / SR 235 north	Northern terminus of SR 186; eastern end of SR 235 concurrency
Hancock	Van Buren	62.65	100.83	I-75	
Hancock	Bloomdale	68.63	110.45	SR 18 west	Western end of SR 18 concurrency
Hancock–Seneca county line	Fostoria	75.95	122.23	US 23 / SR 18 east / SR 199	Eastern end of SR 18 concurrency
1.000 mi = 1.609 km; 1.000 km = 0.621 mi: Concurrency terminus
