= Ohio State Route 109 =

North-south state highway in Ohio, US

State Route 109

Route information
- Maintained by ODOT
- Length: 52.86 mi (85.07 km)
- Existed: 1930–present

Major junctions
- South end: US 224 / SR 15 / SR 65 in Ottawa
- US 6 near Napoleon; US 24 near Napoleon; US 20A / SR 2 in Delta; I-80 / I-90 / Ohio Turnpike near Delta; US 20 near Lyons
- North end: M-52 near Lyons

Location
- Country: United States
- State: Ohio
- Counties: Putnam, Henry, Fulton

Highway system
- Ohio State Highway System; Interstate; US; State; Scenic
← SR 108	→ SR 110

State Route 109 (SR 109) is a 52.9-mile (85.1 km) state route that runs between Ottawa and the Michigan state line in the US state of Ohio. It crosses a major river, the Maumee, east of Napoleon. Most of the route is a rural two-lane highway and passes through both farmland and residential properties.

The highway was first signed in 1930 on much the same alignment as today. SR 109 replaced the SR 65 designation, between SR 110 and the Michigan state line, that dates back to 1923. Some of the highway was paved in 1930, with the rest of the route being paved in 1939.

== Route description ==
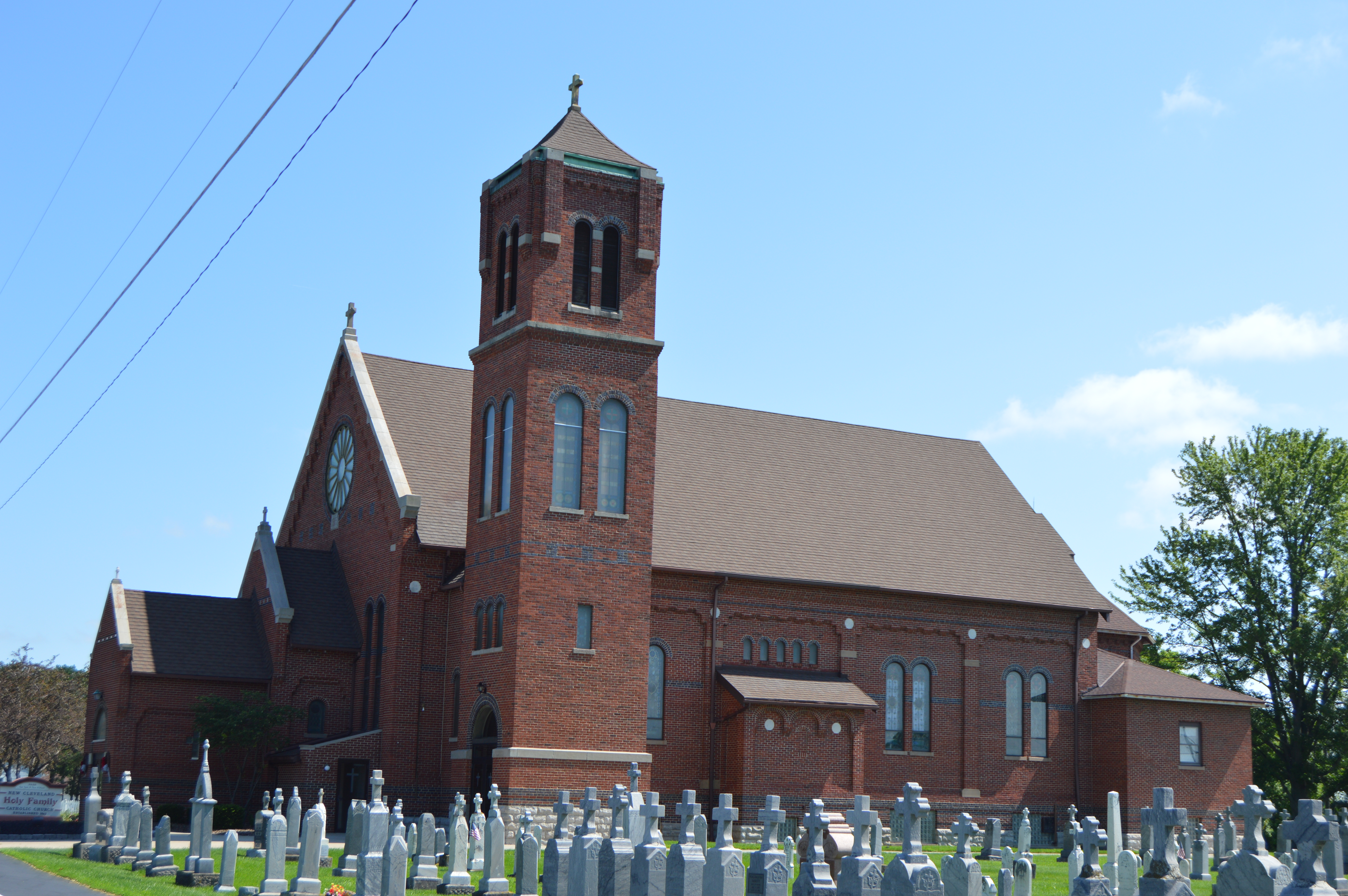
Holy Family Catholic Church at New Cleveland.

SR 109 heads north concurrent with SR 15 and SR 65, in downtown Ottawa. The route heads through the north side of downtown Ottawa as a two-lane highway with a center turn lane, passing through a mix of residential and commercial properties. The concurrency curves northeast and has a traffic signal at the northern end of the SR 15 concurrency, SR 15 heads northwest and the other two routes continues northeast. The concurrency end when SR 109 turns due north and SR 65 continues northeast. The highway passes through residential and commercial as a two-lane highway, before leaving Ottawa. The route passes through farmland, with some houses, and curves northeast.

The road curves back towards the north, before curving northwest, and having an intersection at SR 613. After the intersection with SR 613 the road crosses a Norfolk Southern Railroad track and makes a sharp turn due east. The highway heads east, before another sharp curve due north. The road enters Hamler from the south, passing through residential properties and has an at-grade crossing with CSX Railroad tracks. North of the tracks the road has an intersection with SR 18, this intersection is the southern end of the SR 18 concurrency. The concurrency leaves Hamler heading north through farmland, until SR 18 turns due west and SR 109 continues due north.

SR 109 has an intersection with US 6, east of Napoleon. The highway crosses US 6 and continues north, until a T-intersection at SR 110. Both SR 109 and SR 110 head east parallel to the Maumee River. The concurrency passes under a railroad track owned by the Indiana and Ohio Railway. SR 109 leaves SR 110, heading north and crosses over the Maumee River. On the northside of the river the road enters woodland, before an intersection with Old US 24. SR 109 turns due west onto Old US 24, before turning due north again. The route passes farmland, with some woodland, and has an interchange with US 24.

After the interchange at US 24, SR 109 enters Liberty Center and turns due east. After turning the east the route curves northwest and passes the central business distract area of the village. North of the business distract the highway crosses a railroad track and curves back due north. The highway leaves Liberty Center and enters rural Henry and Fulton Counties, passing through farmland. The route enters Delta and passes under a set of railroad tracks. The road continues north, passing residential properties, to the center of the town. In the center of town SR 109 turns west concurrent with US 20A and SR 2.

The roadway pass through the west side of the town and leaves Delta. West of Delta the road passes under a railroad track and the concurrency ends with SR 109 turning due north. SR 109 heads north through rural farmland, passing over the Ohio Turnpike. After passing over the turnpike the highway as an intersection with the access road the turnpike. The road has an intersection with US 20. North of US 20 the route has an intersection at SR 120. SR 109 end at the Michigan state line and continues north as M-52.

SR 109 is not part of the National Highway System, a system of routes important to the nation's economy, mobility and defense. The highway is maintained by the Ohio Department of Transportation (ODOT). ODOT's 2011 annual average daily traffic (AADT) calculations showed that the lowest traffic levels were present on the section between US 6 and SR 110, where only 680 vehicles used the highway daily; the peak traffic volume was 7480 vehicles AADT along a section that is concurrent with US 20A and SR 2.

== History ==
The route that SR 109 takes north of SR 110 was commissioned in 1923 as SR 65, south of SR 110 was not maintained by the state. SR 109 was signed on its alignment from Ottawa to the Michigan state line in 1930. In that year the route north of SR 110 was paved and a section of road from Delta to northwest of Delta was reroute onto it current alignment. The southern section of the route was paved by 1939. No significant changes have taken place to this state route since 1939.

== Major intersections ==
County	Location	mi	km	Destinations	Notes
Putnam	Ottawa	0.00	0.00	US 224 / SR 15 south (West Main Street) / SR 65 south (South Elm Street)	Southern terminus of SR 109; southern end of SR 15 and SR 65 concurrency
Putnam	Ottawa	0.48	0.77	SR 15 north (North Defiance Street) / North Taft Street	northern end of SR 15 concurrency
Putnam	Ottawa	0.76	1.22	SR 65 north (North Perry Street) / North Locust Street	Northern end of SR 65 concurrency
Putnam	Liberty Township	5.88	9.46	SR 613 – Leipsic, Payne, Continental	
Henry	Hamler	15.59	25.09	SR 18 east (Edgerton Street)	Southern end of SR 18 concurrency
Henry	Marion–Monroe township line	17.03	27.41	SR 18 west / CR G – Holgate	Northern end of SR 18 concurrency
Henry	Monroe Township	19.04	30.64	SR 281 – Defiance, Custar	
Henry	Harrison Township	25.12	40.43	US 6 – Napoleon, McClure	
Henry	Harrison Township	27.58	44.39	SR 110 east – Napoleon	Western end of SR 110 concurrency
Henry	Harrison Township	29.10	46.83	SR 110 east – Grand Rapids	Eastern end of SR 110 concurrency
Henry	Liberty Township	30.68– 30.82	49.37– 49.60	US 24 – Napoleon, Toledo	Exit 47 (US 24)
Fulton	Delta	41.20	66.30	US 20A east / SR 2 east (East Main Street) / North Madison Street	Eastern end of US 20A and SR 2 concurrency
Fulton	York Township	42.96	69.14	US 20A west / SR 2 west – Wauseon	Western end of US 20A and SR 2 concurrency
Fulton	Pike Township	44.38	71.42	I-80 / I-90 / Ohio Turnpike – Toledo, Chicago	Exit 39 (Ohio Tpke.)
Fulton	Royalton Township	49.73	80.03	US 20 to I-475 / US 23 – Fayette, Toledo	
Fulton	Royalton Township	51.73	83.25	SR 120 – Lyons, Metamora	
Fulton	Royalton Township	52.86	85.07	M-52 north – Adrian	Michigan state line; northern terminus of SR 109
1.000 mi = 1.609 km; 1.000 km = 0.621 mi: Concurrency terminus
