= Ohio State Route 110 =

State highway in Henry County, Ohio, US

State Route 110

Route information
- Maintained by ODOT
- Length: 10.73 mi (17.27 km)
- Existed: 1923–present

Major junctions
- West end: SR 108 in Napoleon
- US 6 in Harrison Township
- East end: SR 65 near McClure

Location
- Country: United States
- State: Ohio
- Counties: Henry

Highway system
- Ohio State Highway System; Interstate; US; State; Scenic
← SR 109	→ SR 111

State Route 110 (SR 110) is a 10.73-mile (17.27 km) state route that runs between Napoleon and north of McClure in the US state of Ohio. Most of the route is a rural two-lane highway and passes through both farmland and commercial properties. For much of its path, SR 110 runs generally parallel to the south of the Maumee River.

The highway was first signed in 1923 on much the same alignment as today, bur got as far northeast as Perrysburg. SR 110 was moved to the north side of the Maumee River in 1927. In 1931, the eastern terminus of the route was moved to Grand Rapids. The route was moved back to the south side of the river and the route was extended to Bowling Green in 1942. The eastern terminus of SR 110 was moved to the intersection with SR 65 in 1958.

== Route description ==
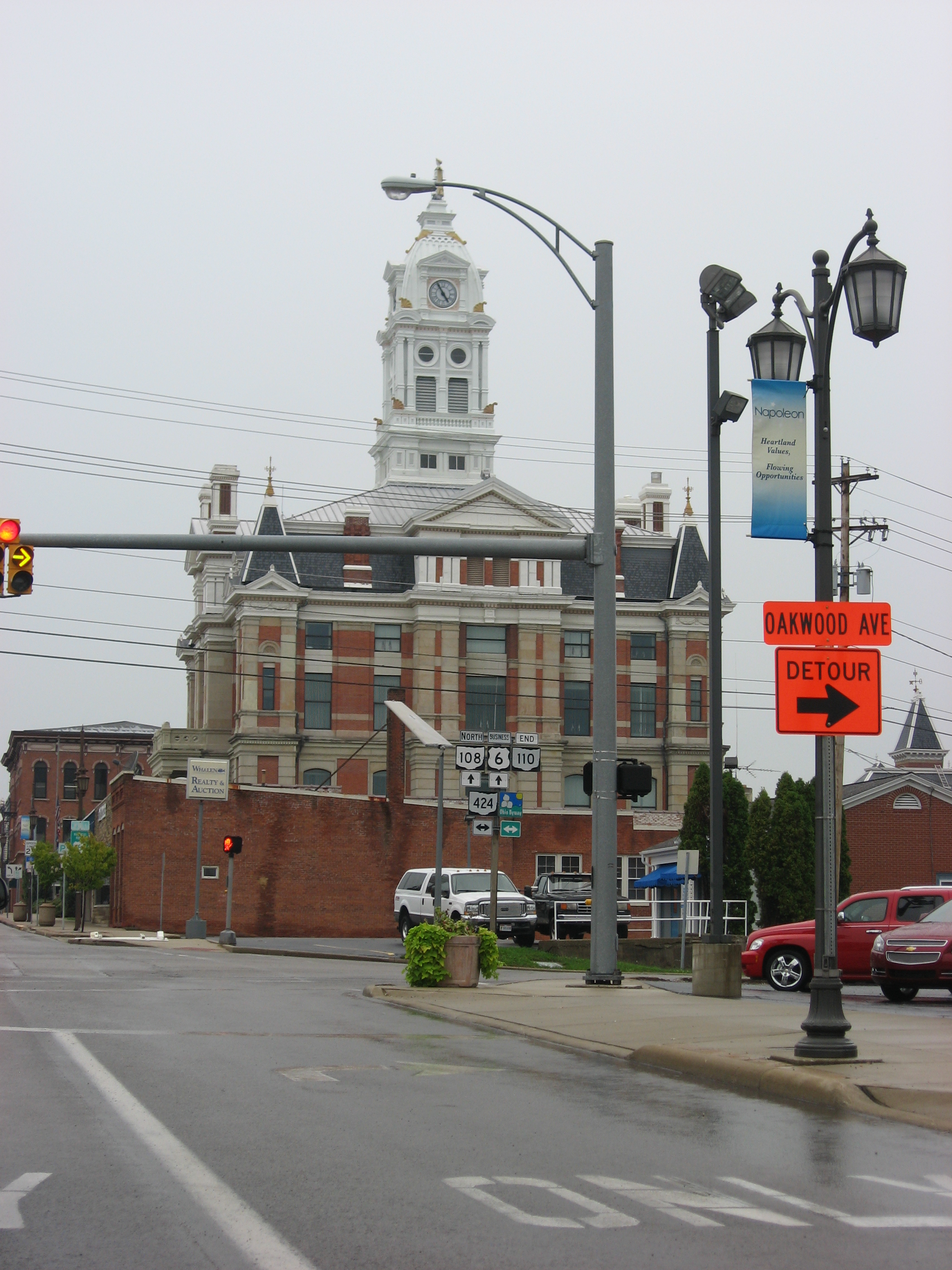
The western terminus of SR 110 is in front of the Henry County Courthouse in Napoleon. The 2009 photo also shows signage for the former SR 424.

SR 110 begins at the intersection of Riverview Avenue (former SR 424) and Perry Street (SR 108) in downtown Napoleon. SR 110 heads southeast from here concurrent with SR 108. The road passes through commercial properties as a four-lane undivided highway. The highway crosses over the Maumee River and has an intersection with the southern end of the SR 108 concurrency. SR 110 turns northeast, passing commercial properties as a four-lane undivided highway. At a traffic signal with Appian Avenue the route narrows to a two-lane highway and parallels the Maumee River, passes through residential properties. The residential properties end and the highway passes through industrial type properties. The road curves towards the east, still parallel to the river, and passes through farmland, with some woodland. The highway has an interchange with U.S. Route 6 (US 6) in rural Henry County. East of the interchange is an intersection with SR 109, this interchange is the western end of a concurrency with SR 109. The concurrency heads east passing under railroad tracks owned by Indiana and Ohio Railway. After the tracks the road curve southeast and SR 109 leaves SR 110 heading north over the Maumee River. The highway continues southeast, before curving northeast passing through a wooded area. The route turns due east and passes through farmland, before its eastern terminus at an intersection with SR 65.

SR 110 is not part of the National Highway System, a system of routes important to the nation's economy, mobility and defense. The highway is maintained by the Ohio Department of Transportation (ODOT). ODOT's 2011 annual average daily traffic (AADT) calculations showed that the lowest traffic levels were present on the section that is between SR 109 and SR 65, where only 1,500 vehicles used the highway daily; the peak traffic volume was 6,960 vehicles AADT along a section that is concurrent with SR 108.

== History ==
SR 110 was originally signed in 1923. At that time SR 110 ran along its current route from Napoleon to Grand Rapids and along current SR 65 from Grand Rapids to Perrysburg. The current route of SR 110 was paved by 1926. In 1927, SR 110 was moved to run along the north bank of the Maumee River from Napoleon to Grand Rapids, with US 24 taking the south bank of the river. In 1931, its eastern terminus was moved to Grand Rapids. In 1942, the eastern terminus was extended to Bowling Green, replacing SR 184. Also in that year the route was flipped US 24, once again putting SR 110 on the south banks of the Maumee. In 1958, SR 110 was truncated to its current terminus, leaving the road between SR 65 and SR 64 unnumbered. No significant changes have taken place to this state route since 1958.

== Major intersections ==
The entire route is in Henry County.

Location	mi	km	Destinations	Notes
Napoleon	0.00	0.00	SR 108 north (Perry Street) / Riverview Avenue	Northern end of SR 108 concurrency
Napoleon	0.29	0.47	SR 108 south (South Perry Street) / West Maumee Avenue	Southern end of SR 108 concurrency
Harrison Township	4.19	6.74	US 6 – Bryan, Bowling Green	
Harrison Township	5.21	8.38	SR 109 south – Malinta	Western end of SR 109 concurrency
Harrison Township	6.73	10.83	SR 109 north	Eastern end of SR 109 concurrency
Damascus Township	10.73	17.27	SR 65 – Grand Rapids, McClure	
1.000 mi = 1.609 km; 1.000 km = 0.621 mi: Concurrency terminus
