= Knoxville, Ohio =

Unincorporated community in Ohio, U.S.

Coordinates: 40°29′32″N 80°40′50″W

Knoxville is an unincorporated community in Jefferson County, in the U.S. state of Ohio.

== History ==
Knoxville was laid out in 1816, and named for the township in which it is located, Knox Township. A post office was established at Knoxville in 1816, and remained in operation until 1907.
