= Kieferville, Ohio =

Unincorporated community in Ohio, U.S.

Coordinates: 41°06′01″N 84°12′24″W

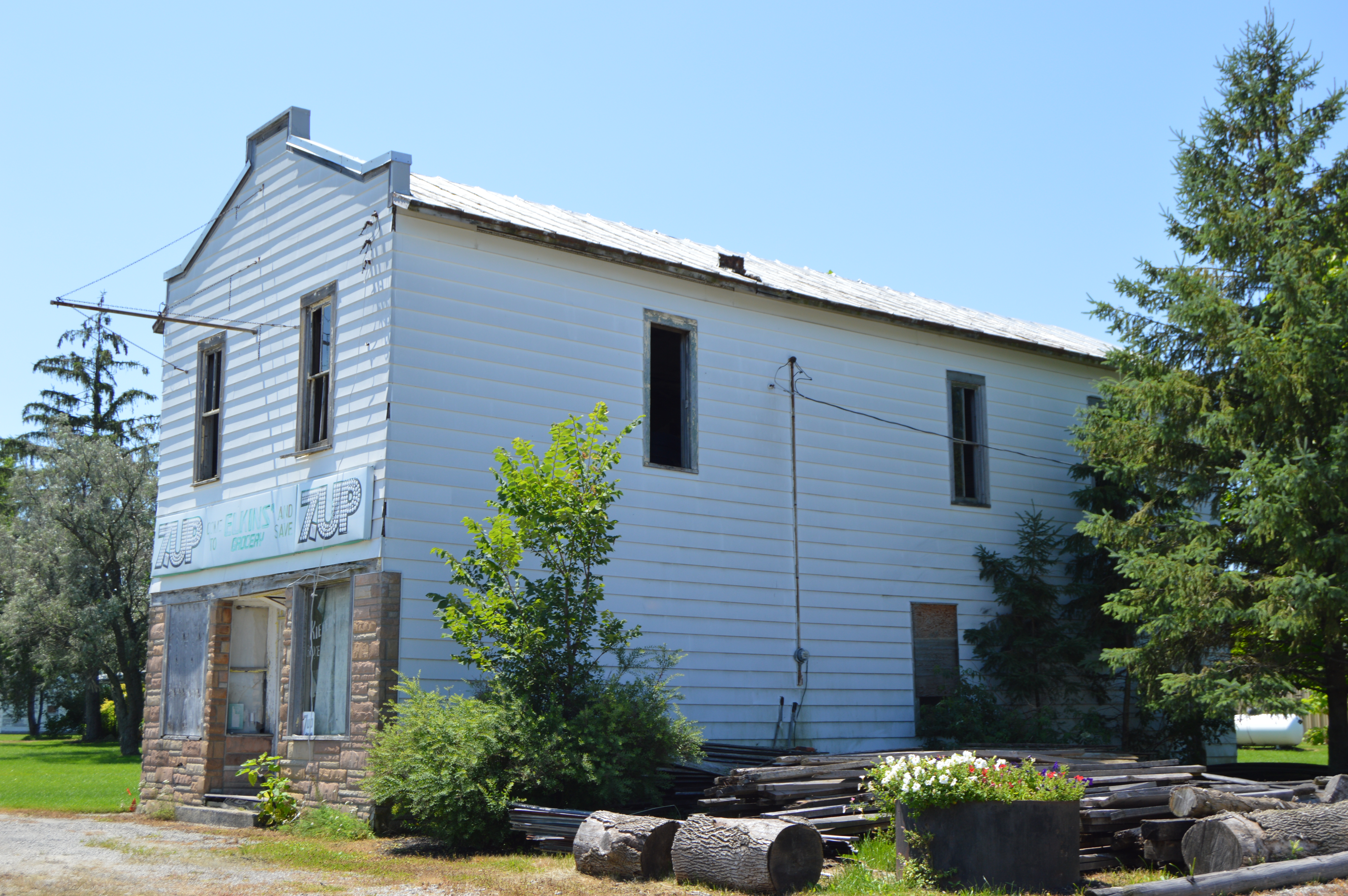
Former general store on State Route 15

Kieferville is an unincorporated community in Putnam County, in the U.S. state of Ohio.

Kieferville was platted in 1870 when the railroad was extended to that point. The community was founded by D. A. Kiefer, and named for him. A post office was established at Kieferville in 1876, and remained in operation until it was discontinued in 1905.
