= Ohio State Route 424 =

State highway in Henry County, Ohio, US

State Route 424

- Map of SR 424 c. 2008

Route information
- Maintained by ODOT
- Length: 25.77 mi (Note: This length reflects the maximum length the route was designated) (41.47 km)
- Existed: 1964–2012

Major junctions
- West end: US 24 in Defiance (Note: Western terminus from 1964 to 2008)
- East end: Dead end near Napoleon

Location
- Country: United States
- State: Ohio
- Counties: Henry

Highway system
- Ohio State Highway System; Interstate; US; State; Scenic
| ← SR 423 | → SR 430 |

State Route 424 (SR 424) was an east–west state highway in the northwestern portion of the U.S. state of Ohio. The route was a former section of US 24 that ran parallel to the Maumee River and Miami and Erie Canal between the cities of Defiance and Napoleon. First designated in 1964, the western terminus of the route for most of its history was at an intersection with US 24 west of Defiance, though between 2008 and when the route was fully removed from the state highway system in 2012, it was at the Defiance County/Henry County line. Its eastern terminus was at a dead end near the US 6 / US 24 interchange east of Napoleon.

== Route description ==
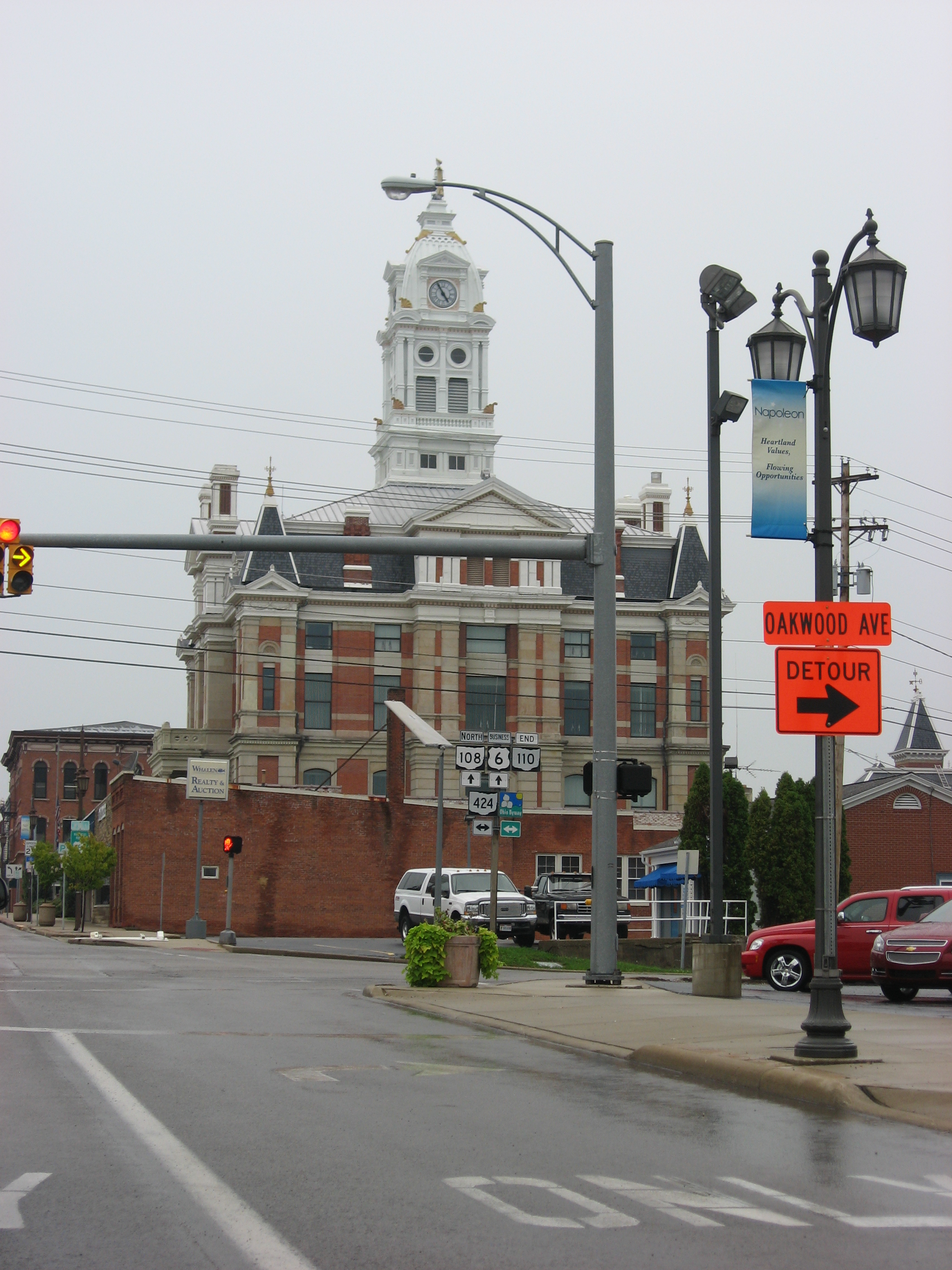
Photo of the Henry County Courthouse in Napoleon showing the intersection of SR 424, SR 108, and SR 110 in 2009.

SR 424 began at an intersection with US 24 inside the city limits of Defiance, though 3 miles (4.8 km) west of the center of the city. At this point, the route was also called Baltimore Street. At the intersection with Deatrick Street, the name of the street that carried SR 424 changed to Holgate Avenue; overheight truck routes for SR 66 and SR 111 were designated along this section of SR 424 as well. Continuing northeast, the route made a sharp curve to the southeast and changed its name to West Third Avenue. Shortly after passing under an Indiana Northeastern Railroad bridge, the route came to a signalized intersection with South Clinton Avenue which also carries SR 111 in downtown Defiance. SR 424 turned left onto South Clinton Avenue with the last block of SR 111 before coming to the intersection with State Routes 15, 18, and 66. SR 111 ends while SR 424 continued with the three state routes north on Clinton Avenue and over the Maumee River on a bridge. Immediately after the bridge, SR 424 turned right onto River Drive while the three other routes continue on Clinton Avenue. From this point to the eastern terminus, SR 424 closely followed the northern bank of the Maumee River. In the eastern neighborhoods of Defiance, SR 424 passed under the bridge that carries SR 281 over the river; a short connector road provided access to SR 281. In Richland Township, SR 424 passed the entrances to the Independence Dam State Park. Just after the park, the route curved to the northeast and crossed into Henry County.

In Henry County, the route continued northeast through Flatrock Township. SR 424 entered the village of Florida where the route was also known as High Street. After briefly traveling east to follow the river bank, the route turned north and entered the city limits of Napoleon. Throughout the city, the route name was Riverview Avenue. In the center of Napoleon, SR 424 intersected SR 108 at Perry Street. This intersection is also the western terminus of SR 110. Continuing northeast, SR 424 entered Liberty Township and had a partial interchange with US 6. 0.2 miles (0.32 km) past the interchange, SR 424-C, a 0.17-mile-long (0.27 km) connector route between SR 424 and US 24 provided the access to westbound US 6 and US 24 which was not possible at the previous interchange. The mainline SR 424 continued east along the river past a few houses before coming to a dead end just short of the mainline, two-lane segment of US 24.

Since the decommissioning of the route, the intersection at the original western terminus in Defiance has become a folded diamond interchange, exit 22 off of the US 24 freeway. SR 424-C has reverted to a township road (Township Road 10) and instead of an at-grade intersection with US 24, an overpass over the new freeway was built. The dead end before the connector between the original US 24 freeway and the two-lane section east of Napoleon has been removed and is now a continuous route. All the roads on the former SR 424 outside of city and village limits are now known as County Road 424.

== History ==
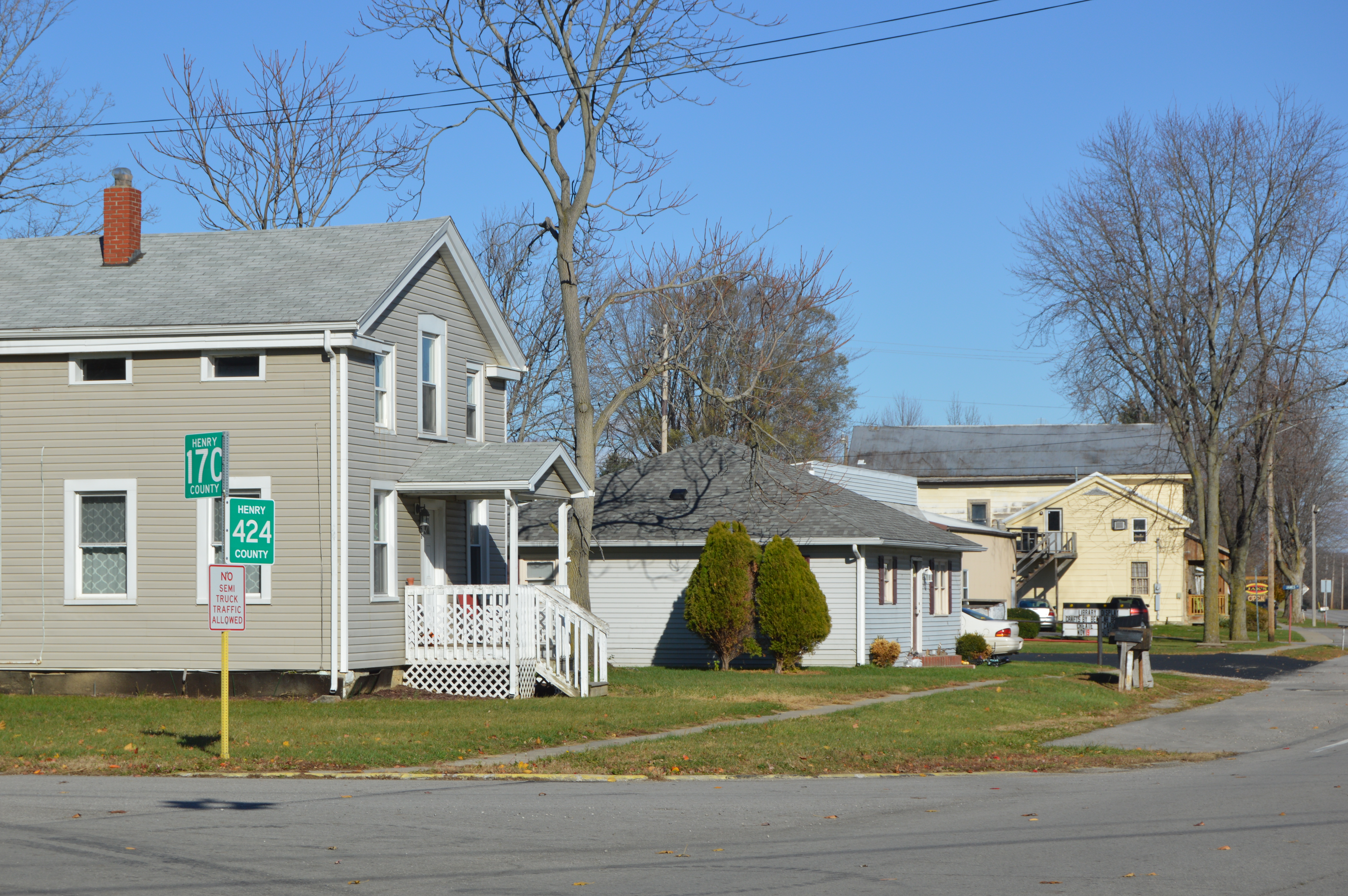
The former SR 424 in Florida

SR 424 was designated in 1964 on the old section of US 24 through Defiance. At that time, US 24 was routed on a bypass north of the city, but returned to the Maumee River alignment via SR 281. By 1969, when more of the bypass of Defiance and Napoleon opened, SR 424 was extended along the river alignment when US 24 was routed onto the new bypass. SR 424 would remain at this routing until 2008.

As the project to bring US 24 up to freeway standards between Fort Wayne, Indiana and Toledo progressed, the SR 424 designation was removed and the road transferred to county engineer departments and cities. The westernmost portion of the route in Defiance County was turned over in November 2008. For about four years, the western terminus of SR 424 was at the Defiance/Henry County line. The eastern portion of the route in Henry County was turned over to county and municipal jurisdiction on December 1, 2012.

== Major intersections ==
| County | Location | mi | km | Destinations | Notes |
|---|---|---|---|---|---|
| Defiance | Defiance | 0.00 | 0.00 | US 24 – Fort Wayne, IN, Napoleon | Western terminus (1964–2008) |
| Defiance | Defiance | 3.42 | 5.50 | SR 111 (South Clinton Avenue) / East Third Street | Western end of SR 111 concurrency |
| Defiance | Defiance | 3.49 | 5.62 | SR 15 south / SR 18 east / SR 66 south (Second Street) / SR 111 ends | Eastern end of SR 111 concurrency; western end of SR 15 / SR 18 / SR 66 concurrency |
| Defiance | Defiance | 3.73 | 6.00 | SR 15 north / SR 18 west / SR 66 north (North Clinton Avenue) / West River Drive | Eastern end of SR 15 / SR 18 / SR 66 concurrency |
| Defiance | Defiance | 5.77 | 9.29 | To SR 281 (Domersville Road) | Interchange; eastern terminus (1964–1969) |
| Defiance–Henry county line | Richland–Flatrock township line | 11.24 | 18.09 | Defiance–Henry County Line Road | Western terminus (2008–2012) |
| Henry | Napoleon | 20.96 | 33.73 | SR 108 / SR 110 east (North Perry Street) | Western terminus of SR 110 |
| Henry | Liberty Township | 24.83 | 39.96 | US 6 east – Bowling Green | No access to US 6 westbound from SR 424 |
| Henry | Liberty Township | 25.05 | 40.31 | SR 424C west to US 6 / US 24 – Toledo | |
| Henry | Liberty Township | 25.77 | 41.47 | Dead end | Eastern terminus (1969–2012) |
1.000 mi = 1.609 km; 1.000 km = 0.621 mi: Concurrency terminus; Incomplete access
