= Bono, Ohio =

- Unincorporated community
- Location within Ohio Location within the United States
- Coordinates: 41°38′08″N 83°16′09″W
- Country: United States
- State: Ohio
- County: Lucas
- Township: Jerusalem
- Elevation: 577 ft (176 m)
- Time zone: UTC-5 (Eastern (EST))
  - Summer (DST): UTC-4 (EDT)
- Area codes: 419 & 567
- GNIS feature ID: 1056226

Bono is an unincorporated community in Lucas County, Ohio, United States.

== History ==
A post office called Bono was established in 1898, and remained in operation until it was discontinued in 1974. The community bears the name of Francis Bunno, chief of the Cherokee.
