= Ohio State Route 108 =

North-south state highway in Ohio, US

State Route 108

Route information
- Maintained by ODOT
- Length: 49.21 mi (79.20 km)
- Existed: 1938–present

Major junctions
- South end: SR 15 south of Miller City
- US 6 / US 24 in Napoleon; US 20A / SR 2 in Wauseon; I-80 / I-90 / Ohio Turnpike near Wauseon; US 20 / CR 18 near Lyons
- North end: M-156 in Morenci, MI

Location
- Country: United States
- State: Ohio
- Counties: Putnam, Henry, Fulton

Highway system
- Ohio State Highway System; Interstate; US; State; Scenic
← SR 107	→ SR 109
← US 33	→ SR 34

State Route 108 (SR 108) is a 49.30-mile (79.34 km) state route that runs between SR 15 and the Michigan state line in the US state of Ohio. Most of the route is a rural two-lane highway and passes through both farmland and residential properties.

The highway was first signed in 1938 on much the same alignment as today. SR 108 replaced the SR 33 and SR 188 designation of the highway which dated back to 1923. SR 188 ran between Ottawa and Holgate and SR 33 ran between Holgate and the Michigan state line. Some of the highway was paved in 1923, with the rest of the route being paved in 1929.

== Route description ==
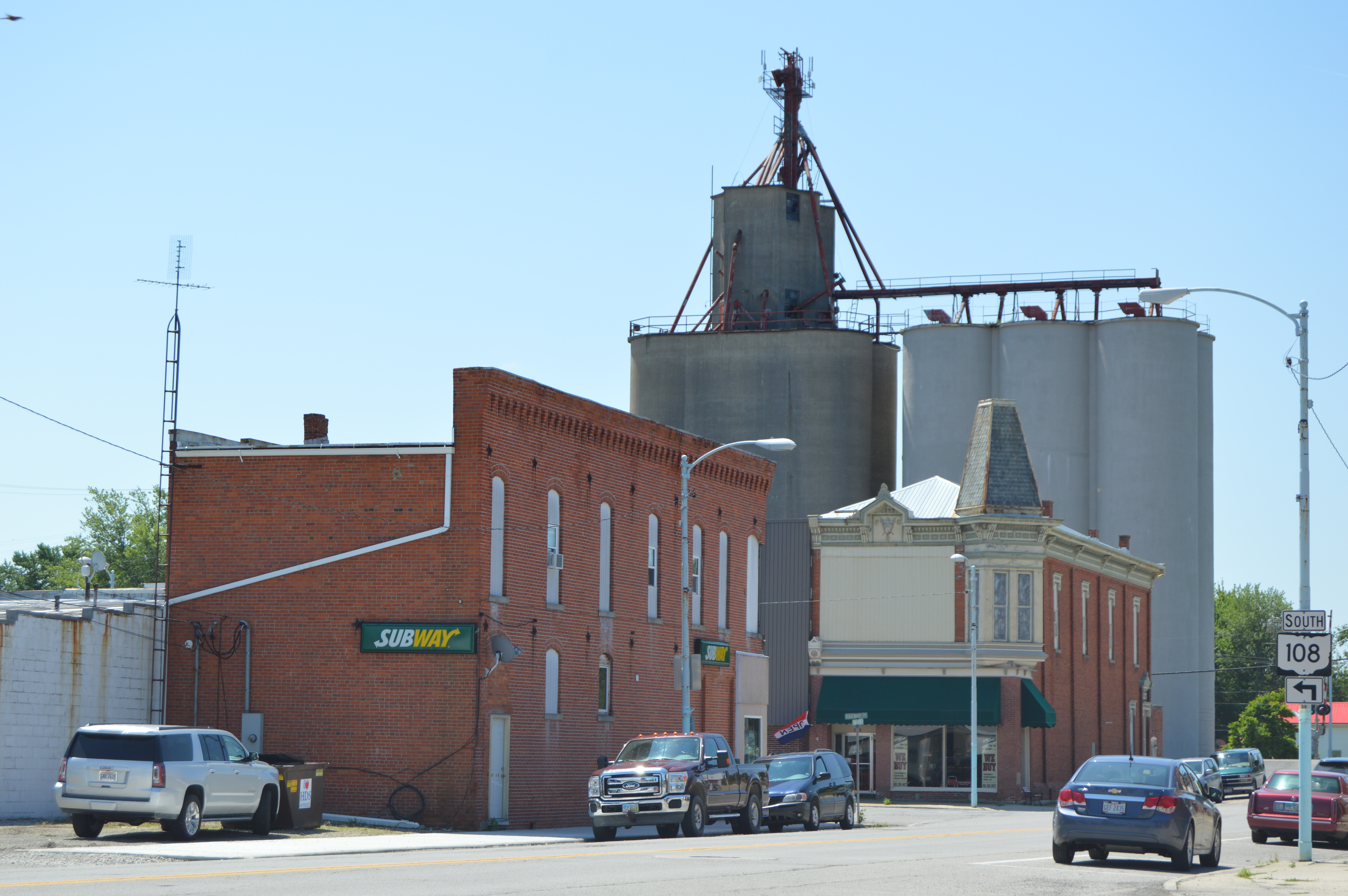
SR 108 through Holgate

SR 108 begins at an intersection with SR 15, in rural Putnam County. The highway heads north as a two-lane highway, passing through farmland, with a few houses. The route has an intersection with SR 613, followed by enter the town of Miller City. In Miller City the road has an at-grade crossing with a Norfolk Southern Railroad track. After the tracks the route passes through residential properties, before leaving Miller City. The route heads north entering Henry County. The highway enters Holgate and the roadway curves northeast, passing through residential properties. The road crosses a set of CSX Railroad tracks, before entering downtown Holgate. In downtown Holgate the road turns northwest, passing commercial businesses, before turning northeast. After turning northeast the highway leaves downtown and passes through residential properties on the north side of Holgate. Before leaving the town of Holgate is an intersection with SR 18. Northeast of Holgate the route passes through rural farmland and has an intersection with SR 281.

After SR 281, SR 108 curves due north towards Napoleon. The highway enters Napoleon, passing through residential properties and curving northwest. After curving northwest the route begins a concurrency with SR 110. The concurrency crosses over the Maumee River and enters downtown Napoleon. After the bridge end is an intersection with the former SR 424 (Riverview Avenue); this intersection is the western terminus of SR 110. In downtown Napoleon, the highway passes through commercial type business, before turning southwest onto Clinton Street. At a five-way intersection SR 108 turns northwest, onto Scott Street, leaving downtown Napoleon. The roadway heads northwest passing through an residential area of town. At a traffic light with Lagrange Street the route curves due north, passing through commercial businesses. The road has an interchange with U.S. Route 6 (US 6) and US 24, before leaving Napoleon. The road leaves Napoleon heading due north passing through rural farmland, with some houses, heading towards Wauseon. The roadway enters Wauseon, passing through a mostly residential area.

The highway passes under some Norfolk Southern Railroad tracks. After passing under the tracks the route begins a concurrency with SR 2. The concurrency continues due north through residential properties, before entering commercial use properties. At an intersection with US 20A the concurrency ends with SR 2 turning east concurrent with US 20A and SR 108 turning west concurrent with US 20A. SR 108 and US 20A head west passing through commercial and residential properties. On the northwest side of Wauseon the concurrency with US 20A ends, with SR 108 turning due north and US 20A continuing due west. North of US 20A, SR 108 leaves Wauseon and enters farmland, with some businesses and houses. The road has an intersection with the Ohio Turnpike, in rural Dover Township. The route heads north toward US 20, where SR 108 turns west concurrent with US 20. The two routes head west passing through farmland, before SR 108 turns due north leaving the concurrency. SR 108 heads north passing farmland, before ending at the Michigan state line, south of Morenci. The roadway continues north as M-156.

The section of SR 108 between the Ohio Turnpike and US 20 is part of the National Highway System, a system of routes important to the nation's economy, mobility and defense. The highway is maintained by the Ohio Department of Transportation (ODOT). ODOT's 2011 annual average daily traffic (AADT) calculations showed that the lowest traffic levels were present at the Michigan state line, where only 1,160 vehicles used the highway daily; the peak traffic volume was 12,210 vehicles AADT along a section that is concurrent with SR 110.

== History ==
State Route 33
- Location: Lima–Chesterfield Township
- Existed: 1923–1938

The route that SR 108 takes today was signed in 1923 as SR 188 south of Holgate and SR 33 north of Holgate. The route north of Holgate as paved in this year. By 1929, SR 188 was paved. SR 108 was signed in 1938 on the same route as today. No significant changes have taken place to this state route since 1938. In March 2020, a bill was signed into law naming SR 108 through Henry County the Alene Duerk Memorial Highway, named for Alene Duerk, the first female admiral in the U.S. Navy who grew up in Holgate.

== Major intersections ==
County	Location	mi	km	Destinations	Notes
Putnam	Greensburg Township	0.00– 0.60	0.00– 0.97	SR 15 / Road 14 – Ottawa, Defiance	Southern terminus
Putnam	Palmer Township	2.08	3.35	SR 613 – Continental, Leipsic	
Henry	Holgate	13.31	21.42	SR 18 (Joe E. Brown Avenue) – Defiance, Hamler	
Henry	Flatrock Township	15.51	24.96	SR 281 – Defiance, Custar	
Henry	Napoleon	22.65	36.45	US 6 Bus. east / SR 110 east (Maumee Avenue)	Southern end of US 6 Bus. / SR 110 concurrency
Henry	Napoleon	22.94	36.92	SR 110 ends / Riverview Avenue	Northern end of SR 110 concurrency; northern terminus of SR 110
Henry	Napoleon	24.42	39.30	US 6 / US 24 / US 6 Bus. ends – Maumee, Defiance	Exit 37 on US 6/US 24; northern end of US 6 Bus. concurrency
Fulton	Wauseon	34.26	55.14	SR 2 west (Elm Street)	Southern end of SR 2 concurrency
Fulton	Wauseon	34.86	56.10	SR 2 (Linfoot Street)	Southern end of westbound SR 2 concurrency, unsigned SR 2D
Fulton	Wauseon	35.86	57.71	US 20A east / SR 2 east (Airport Highway) / CR 14 – Delta, Toledo	Eastern end of US 20A concurrency; northern end of SR 2 concurrency
Fulton	Wauseon	36.59	58.89	US 20A west / Ottokee Street – West Unity	Western end of US 20A concurrency
Fulton	Dover Township	37.98	61.12	I-80 / I-90 / Ohio Turnpike – Toledo, Chicago	Exit 34 on the Ohio Turnpike
Fulton	Chesterfield Township	43.22	69.56	US 20 east – Toledo	Eastern end of US 20 concurrency
Fulton	Chesterfield Township	46.22	74.38	US 20 west / CR 18 – Fayette	Western end of US 20 concurrency
Fulton	Chesterfield Township	49.21	79.20	M-156 north – Morenci	Northern terminus at Michigan state line; M-156 continues to the north
1.000 mi = 1.609 km; 1.000 km = 0.621 mi: Concurrency terminus
