= Roachester, Ohio =

- Unincorporated community
- Location within Ohio Location within the United States
- Coordinates: 39°21′14″N 84°05′56″W
- Country: United States
- State: Ohio
- County: Warren

Area
  - Total: 1.31 sq mi (3.39 km^{2})
  - Land: 1.31 sq mi (3.39 km^{2})
  - Water: 0 sq mi (0.00 km^{2})
- Elevation: 827 ft (252 m)

Population (2020)
  - Total: 579
  - Density: 442.4/sq mi (170.81/km^{2})
- Time zone: UTC-5 (Eastern (EST))
  - Summer (DST): UTC-4 (EDT)
- Area code: 513
- GNIS feature ID: 2812844

Roachester is an unincorporated community in Warren County, Ohio, United States. As of the 2020 census, Roachester had a population of 579. Roachester is located at the junction of Ohio State Route 3 and Ohio State Route 123, 1.6 miles (2.6 km) east of Morrow.

== History ==
An early variant name was "Salem". Roachester was platted in 1816, and named for James Roach, proprietor. A post office called Rochester was established in 1825, and remained in operation until 1853.

== Demographics ==
Historical population
Census	Pop.	Note	%±
2020	579		—
U.S. Decennial Census
