= Conant, Ohio =

Unincorporated community in Ohio, U.S.

Coordinates: 40°43′08″N 84°16′50″W

Conant is an unincorporated community in Allen County, in the U.S. state of Ohio.

== History ==
Conant had its start in 1884 when the Chicago and Atlantic Railroad was extended to that point. A post office called Conant was established in 1884, and remained in operation until 1919.
