= Ohio State Route 107 =

State highway in Williams County, Ohio, US

State Route 107

Route information
- Maintained by ODOT
- Length: 11.05 mi (17.78 km)
- Existed: 1923–present

Major junctions
- West end: SR 49 near Edon
- SR 576 in Montpelier
- East end: US 20A / SR 15 near Montpelier

Location
- Country: United States
- State: Ohio
- Counties: Williams

Highway system
- Ohio State Highway System; Interstate; US; State; Scenic
← SR 106	→ SR 108

State Route 107 (SR 107) is a state route that runs between SR 49 and U.S. Route 20A (US 20A)/SR 15 in the US state of Ohio. The 11.05 miles (17.78 km) of SR 107 that lie within the state serve as a minor highway. Various sections are rural two-lane highway and rural four-lane highway. The highway passes through residential and commercial properties.

The highway was first signed in 1923 and was much longer than it is today, going to the Michigan state line. Some of the route was replaced by SR 51 and US 20A. SR 107 was extended in the 1960s, when US 20A was rerouted onto SR 15.

== Route description ==
SR 107 heads east from its western terminus as a two-lane rural highway passing through farmland with some houses. The route crosses the St. Joseph River and enters the downtown business district of Montpelier. The road has a traffic signal and begins a concurrency with SR 576. The concurrency heads east leaving the business district and ending residential areas. In the residential area the concurrency with SR 576 ends, with SR 576 turning south. The highway becomes a four-lane undivided highway passing through commercial properties, with some houses. The road leaves Montpelier and enters rural Williams County, passing through farmland with a few houses. East of Montpelier the highway has a bridge over a set of Norfolk Southern Railroad tracks and the roadway narrows to a two-lane highway. The road heads towards its eastern terminus at an intersection with US 20A and SR 15.

SR 107 is not part of the National Highway System, a network of highways important to the economy, mobility and defense of the nation. The highway is maintained by the Ohio Department of Transportation (ODOT). ODOT's 2008 annual average daily traffic (AADT) calculations showed that lowest traffic levels were the 1,260 vehicles which used the highway daily on a section at its western terminus; the peak traffic volumes were 8,980 vehicles AADT along a section of SR 107 at the eastern end of the SR 576 concurrency.

== History ==
The first time SR 107 was signed was in 1923 and went to the Michigan state line on what is now SR 49. At this time the eastern terminus was at SR 66, east of West Unity. In 1925 the north–south section was renumber to SR 51. In 1932 US 20S was commissioned in Ohio and replace SR 107 east of Montpelier. US 20S was changed to US 20A in 1935. By 1964 US 20A was reroute north concurrent with SR 15 and SR 107 was extended east of Montpelier to SR 15.

== Major intersections ==
The entire route is in Williams County.

Location	mi	km	Destinations	Notes
Florence Township	0.00	0.00	SR 49 to Ohio Turnpike	
Montpelier	8.13	13.08	SR 576 north (Monroe Street)	Western end of SR 576 concurrency
Montpelier	8.39	13.50	SR 576 south (South Platt Street)	Eastern end of SR 576 concurrency
Jefferson Township	11.05	17.78	US 20A / SR 15	
1.000 mi = 1.609 km; 1.000 km = 0.621 mi: Concurrency terminus
