= Ohio State Route 186 =

State highway in Hancock County, Ohio, US

State Route 186

Route information
- Maintained by ODOT
- Length: 3.78 mi (6.08 km)
- Existed: 1924–present

Major junctions
- South end: US 224 / SR 15 near McComb
- North end: SR 235 / SR 613 in McComb

Location
- Country: United States
- State: Ohio
- Counties: Hancock

Highway system
- Ohio State Highway System; Interstate; US; State; Scenic
← SR 185	→ SR 187

State Route 186 (SR 186) is a north–south state highway in the northwestern part of the U.S. state of Ohio. Traveling through mostly rural areas, State Route 186 has its southern terminus at a T-intersection with the U.S. Route 224/State Route 15 concurrency nearly 3.5 miles (5.6 km) south-southeast of McComb. Following a 1-mile (1.6 km) long concurrency with State Route 235 into McComb, State Route 186 arrives at its northern terminus at its junction with State Route 613. North of State Route 613, State Route 235 carries on as a solo route.

== Route description ==
State Route 186 travels entirely within the northwestern quadrant of Hancock County. It is not included within the National Highway System.

== History ==
When originally designated in 1924, State Route 186 composed of the entirety of its current route, and the stretch of State Route 235 from the current northern terminus of State Route 186 in McComb to Hoytville. In 1937, State Route 186 was extended north along the current alignment of State Route 235 from Hoytville to that highway's current northern terminus at State Route 65 along the Maumee River northeast of Grand Rapids. Two years later, however, State Route 186 was shortened to the routing that it has today when the former State Route 69 (now State Route 235) was extended north from McComb over what was the segment of State Route 186 from there to State Route 65.

== Major intersections ==
The entire route is in Hancock County.

Location	mi	km	Destinations	Notes
Liberty Township	0.00	0.00	US 224 / SR 15	
Pleasant Township	2.78	4.47	SR 235 south / CR 97	Southern end of SR 235 concurrency
McComb	3.78	6.08	SR 235 north (North Park Street) / SR 613 (East Main Street)	Northern terminus of SR 235 concurrency
1.000 mi = 1.609 km; 1.000 km = 0.621 mi: Concurrency terminus
