= Unity, Columbiana County, Ohio =

Unity, Ohio
- Unincorporated community
- Location within Ohio Location within the United States
- Country: United States
- State: Ohio
- County: Columbiana
- Township: Unity
- Elevation: 1,217 ft (371 m)
- Time zone: UTC-5 (Eastern (EST))
  - Summer (DST): UTC-4 (EDT)
- ZIP code: 44413
- Area codes: 330, 234
- GNIS feature ID: 1049261

Unity is an unincorporated community in Unity Township, Columbiana County, Ohio, United States. It lies north of East Palestine at the confluence of Ohio State Routes 14, 165, and 170.

== History ==
Unity was platted in 1810. A post office called Unity was established in 1828, and remained in operation until 1902.
