= Marquand Mills, Ohio =

Extinct town in Ohio, U.S.

Coordinates: 40°08′45″N 81°47′50″W

Marquand Mills is an extinct town in Muskingum County, in the U.S. state of Ohio.

== History ==
The namesake Marquand's Mills consisted of a gristmill, sawmill, and carding mill built in the 19th century on Wills Creek by Charles Marquand. A post office called Marquand was established in 1887, and remained in operation until 1902.
