= Ohio State Route 191 =

State highway in Williams County, Ohio, US

State Route 191

Route information
- Maintained by ODOT
- Length: 10.88 mi (17.51 km)
- Existed: 1923–present

Major junctions
- South end: US 6 / CR 22A near Stryker
- North end: US 20A / US 127 in West Unity

Location
- Country: United States
- State: Ohio
- Counties: Williams

Highway system
- Ohio State Highway System; Interstate; US; State; Scenic
← SR 190	→ SR 192

State Route 191 (abbreviated as SR 191) is a north–south state highway in northwestern Ohio, a U.S. state. SR 191's southern terminus is at U.S. Route 6 (US 6) approximately four miles (6.4 km) south of Stryker. Its northern terminus is at the concurrency of US 20A and US 127 in downtown West Unity. Between its southern terminus and Stryker, SR 191 runs parallel to, and to the east of, the Tiffin River.

== Route description ==
SR 191 begins at an intersection with US 6 and begins north toward Stryker. Just north of the southern terminus, SR 191 curves northwest, then reaches an intersection with SR 2 and SR 34. At this intersection, SR 2 becomes concurrent with SR 191, and the routes continue north until reaching the village of Stryker. Entering Stryker on Defiance Street, SR 191 forks west onto Lynn Street, while SR 2 continues north on Defiance Street. Outside of Stryker, the route curves north. After a few miles, SR 191 briefly turns west, then turns north and heads toward West Unity. Inside the village limits of West Unity, SR 191 is known as Main Street. The route ends at its northern terminus at an intersection with US 20A and US 127 in West Unity.

All of SR 191 exists within the confines of Williams County. No segment of this route is incorporated within the National Highway System.

== History ==
At its inception in 1923, SR 191 consisted of the following routes: Defiance County Road 1 from the point where SR 66 crosses the boundary between Defiance and Williams counties west to Evansport; Williams County Road 22-A from Evansport northwest to the current routing of US 6 at the current southern terminus of SR 191; and the current portion of SR 191 from there to SR 2 in Stryker. It was a renumbering of SR 312. In 1937, the highway was extended north from Stryker to its current northern terminus at US 20A and US 127 in West Unity. Then, in 1962, the highway took on its present form when the portion of SR 191 south and east of the existing US 6 was removed from the state highway system, with the segment from the current southern terminus to Evansport renamed as Williams County Road 22-A, and the part from Evansport east that, for the most part, straddles the Defiance-Williams county line given the name of Defiance County Road 1.

== Major intersections ==
The entire route is in Williams County.

Location	mi	km	Destinations	Notes
Springfield Township	0.00	0.00	US 6 / CR 22A – Napoleon, Edgerton	
Springfield Township	2.45	3.94	SR 2 west / SR 34	Southern end of SR 2 concurrency
Stryker	4.33	6.97	SR 2 east (Defiance Street) / East Lynn Street	Northern end of SR 2 concurrency
West Unity	10.88	17.51	US 20A / US 127 (Jackson Street) / Main Street	
1.000 mi = 1.609 km; 1.000 km = 0.621 mi: Concurrency terminus
