= Bloomfield, Muskingum County, Ohio =

Unincorporated community in Ohio, U.S.

Coordinates: 40°03′01″N 81°44′32″W

Bloomfield is an unincorporated community in Muskingum County, in the U.S. state of Ohio.

== History ==
Bloomfield was laid out and platted in 1853. The community was named for blooming orchard fields near the original town site. The post office at Bloomfield was called Sago. The Sago post office was established in 1857, and remained in operation until 1902.
