= U.S. Route 20A (Ohio) =

Alternate U.S. Route in Ohio, United States

U.S. Route 20A

Route information
- Maintained by ODOT
- Length: 52.448 mi (84.407 km)
- Existed: 1935–present

Major junctions
- West end: US 20 west of Pioneer
- I-80 / I-90 / Ohio Turnpike in Holiday City; US 127 near West Unity; SR 2 from Wauseon to Swanton
- East end: US 20 in Maumee

Location
- Country: United States
- State: Ohio
- Counties: Williams, Fulton, Lucas

Highway system
- United States Numbered Highway System; List; Special; Divided; Ohio State Highway System; Interstate; US; State; Scenic
← SR 20	→ US 21

U.S. Route 20A (US 20A) is a 52.4-mile-long (84.3 km) east–west alternate route of US 20 located in northwest Ohio. The western terminus of the route is at US 20 southwest of Pioneer, and the eastern terminus is at US 20 in Maumee, southwest of Toledo.

== Route description ==
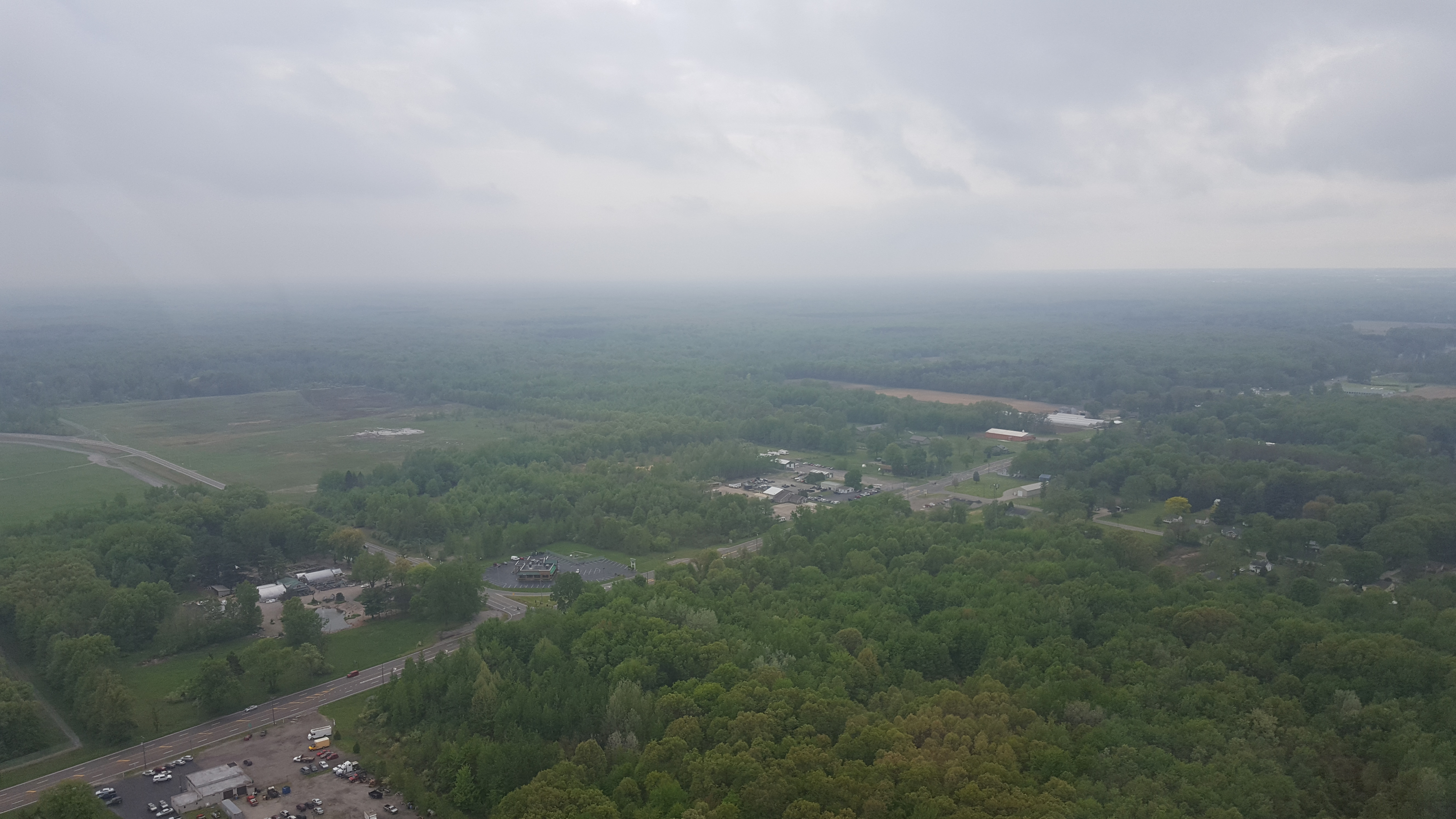
An aerial view of US 20A, SR 2, and SR 295

The route runs parallel to the Ohio Turnpike (Interstate 80/Interstate 90 [I-80/I-90]) for much of its length, and intersects the turnpike at exit 13 northeast of Montpelier in Holiday City. US 20 and US 20A are never more than five miles (8.0 km) apart for the entire 50-mile (80 km) stretch through the Ohio farm country, as the mainline of US 20 takes the more northerly route.

== History ==
The current US 20A was designated U.S. Route 20S (US 20S) in 1932, which replaced State Route 271 (SR 271) which had run from US 20 south to Montpelier, truncated SR 107, joined SR 2, and followed a road formerly not on the state highway system through most of Lucas County. It became US 20A in 1935. US 20A was moved to its current location along SR 15 from SR 576 and SR 107 in 1964. (SR 107 then reclaimed some of the miles that had been taken from it in 1932.) In the 1950s, part of the road east of Swanton was abandoned to make way for Toledo Express Airport.

== Major junctions ==
County	Location	mi	km	Destinations	Notes
Williams	Bridgewater Township	0.000– 0.033	0.000– 0.053	US 20 – Angola, IN	Western terminus of US 20A
Williams	Madison Township	1.098	1.767	SR 15 north – Pioneer; CR O	Northern end of SR 15 concurrency
Williams	Holiday City	2.866– 3.156	4.612– 5.079	I-80 / I-90 / Ohio Turnpike – Chicago, Toledo	Exit 13 on Ohio Turnpike
Williams	Jefferson Township	4.765	7.669	SR 15 south – Bryan SR 107 west – Montpelier	Southern end of SR 15 concurrency; eastern terminus of SR 107
Williams	West Unity	11.000	17.703	US 127 south (South Defiance Street)	Western end of US 127 concurrency
Williams	West Unity	11.082	17.835	SR 191 south (Main Street)	Northern terminus of SR 107
Williams	West Unity	11.198	18.021	US 127 north (Liberty Street)	Eastern end of US 127 concurrency
Fulton	German Township	16.832	27.088	SR 66 north to Ohio Turnpike / CR 24 – Fayette	Western end of SR 66 concurrency
Fulton	German Township	17.951	28.889	SR 66 south / CR 23 – Archbold	Eastern end of SR 66 concurrency
Fulton	Wauseon–Clinton Township line	26.153	42.089	SR 108 north to Ohio Turnpike / Ottokee Street – Oakshade	Western end of SR 108 concurrency
Fulton	Wauseon–Clinton Township line	26.882	43.262	SR 2 west / SR 108 south / CR 14 – Napoleon, Ottokee, Fulton County Airport	Eastern end of SR 108 concurrency; western end of SR 2 concurrency
Fulton	York Township	31.906	51.348	SR 109 north to Ohio Turnpike – Adrian	Western end of SR 109 concurrency
Fulton	Delta	33.665	54.179	SR 109 south (Madison Street)	Eastern end of SR 109 concurrency
Fulton	Swanton	39.842	64.119	SR 64 north (South Main Street) / CR 1-1	Western end of SR 64 concurrency
Fulton	Swanton	40.573	65.296	SR 64 south (Waterville–Swanton Road) – Neapolis, Whitehouse	Western end of SR 64 concurrency
Lucas	Swanton Township	42.283– 42.363	68.048– 68.177	SR 2 east / SR 295 north to Ohio Turnpike	Eastern end of SR 2 concurrency; western end of SR 295 concurrency
Lucas	Swanton Township	43.643	70.237	SR 295 south – Whitehouse	Eastern end of SR 295 concurrency
Lucas	Maumee	50.564	81.375	I-475 / US 23	New diverging diamond interchange opened on August 4, 2025
Lucas	Maumee	52.448	84.407	US 20 (Conant Street) / Indiana Avenue	Eastern terminus of US 20A
1.000 mi = 1.609 km; 1.000 km = 0.621 mi: Concurrency terminus
