= Ohio State Route 111 =

State highway in Ohio, US

State Route 111

Route information
- Maintained by ODOT
- Length: 31.49 mi (50.68 km)
- Existed: 1923–present

Major junctions
- West end: Woodburn Road near Edgerton, IN
- US 127 in Paulding
- East end: SR 15 / SR 18 / SR 66 in Defiance

Location
- Country: United States
- State: Ohio
- Counties: Paulding, Defiance

Highway system
- Ohio State Highway System; Interstate; US; State; Scenic
← SR 110	→ SR 112

State Route 111 (SR 111) is a 31.49-mile (50.68 km) state route that runs between the Indiana state line and Defiance in the US state of Ohio. Most of the route is a rural two-lane highway and passes through both farmland and residential properties. For some of its path, SR 111 runs generally parallel to the north of the Auglaize River.

The highway was first signed in 1923 on much the same alignment as today. A few realignments of the route have happened; the first in 1927 removed a section of highway west of SR 49. This section was later extended due west of SR 49 to the Indiana state line. Another realignment happened in 1983 with the route heading north out of Paulding concurrent with U.S. Route 127 (US 127).

== Route description ==
SR 111 begins at an intersection with Woodburn Road and State Line Road on the Indiana state line. The road heads north along the state line passing through farmland as a two-lane highway. The road turns due east and heads away from the state line. The highway has an intersection with SR 49 in rural Paulding County. The route enters the village of Paulding and has an intersection with SR 500. After the intersection with SR 500 the route passes through a mix of residential and commercial properties. The route makes a sharp curve and heads north towards downtown Paulding. In downtown Paulding, the road has a traffic signal at US 127 and the two routes head north concurrent. The concurrency passes the Paulding County Court House and head north out of downtown Paulding. On the north side of the village the highway passes through mostly residential properties, with some commercial properties.

The two highways leave Paulding and passes through farmland, with a few houses. North of Paulding, in rural Paulding County, SR 111 turns east towards Defiance, with US 127 still heading north. The highway heads east passing through farmland, with some houses. The route begins a concurrency with SR 637 west of Junction. The concurrency enters Junction and the concurrency ends with SR 637 heading east and SR 111 heading northeast. The highway leaves Junction heading northeast with the Auglaize River close to the south side of the roadway, resulting in that side of the highway becoming primarily wooded, while the northside of the highway remains bounded by farmland. The road enters Defiance on the southwest side of town, passing through residential properties. At Deatrick and Downs streets, SR 111 intersects SR 66 Truck and SR 111 Truck, a bypass for a low-clearance railroad bridge. The highway passes under the aforementioned railroad bridge (carrying CSX Railroad tracks) and enters downtown Defiance. In the city's downtown, SR 111 reaches a signalized intersection with Third Street, the northern end of the SR 66 and 111 truck routes (also formerly SR 424). An end SR 111 sign assembly is present at this intersection but Ohio Department of Transportation (ODOT) records continue SR 111 one block north concurrent with SR 66 Truck to end at SR 15, SR 18, and SR 66.

SR 111 is not part of the National Highway System, a system of routes important to the nation's economy, mobility and defense. The highway is maintained by ODOT. ODOT's 2009 annual average daily traffic (AADT) calculations showed that the lowest traffic levels were the 2,663 vehicles which used the highway daily on the section that is between the Indiana state line and SR 49; the peak traffic volumes were 12,220 vehicles AADT along a section of SR 111 near its eastern terminus, in downtown Defiance.

== History ==
SR 111 was first signed and paved in 1923 from the Indiana state line west of Payne to Defiance. The route from Indiana to Payne is now SR 613 and SR 111 was concurrent with SR 108, now SR 49, north of Payne. In 1927 the route from Payne west became SR 113, leaving SR 111 only between SR 49 and Defiance. The highway was extended to Indiana state line heading due west from SR 49 towards Indiana in 1935. In 1983 the route was moved to its current route between Paulding and Defiance. No significant changes have taken place to this state route since 1983.

== Major intersections ==
County	Location	mi	km	Destinations	Notes
Paulding–Allen county line	Harrison–Maumee township line	0.00	0.00	State Line Road south / Woodburn Road west	Indiana state line
Paulding	Harrison Township	4.67	7.52	SR 49 – Hicksville, Payne, Antwerp	
Paulding	Paulding	11.16	17.96	SR 500 west – Payne	Eastern terminus of SR 500
Paulding	Paulding	12.43	20.00	US 127 south (Perry Street)	Southern end of US 127 concurrency
Paulding	Crane Township	16.37	26.34	US 127 north – Sherwood	Northern end of US 127 concurrency
Paulding	Emerald–Auglaize township line	21.96	35.34	SR 637 south – Grover Hill	Western end of SR 637 concurrency
Paulding	Auglaize Township	23.40	37.66	SR 637 north – Oakwood	Eastern end of SR 637 concurrency
Defiance	Defiance	30.46	49.02	SR 111 Truck north / SR 66 Truck (Deatrick Street / Downs Street)	Southern terminus of SR 111 Truck
Defiance	Defiance	31.42	50.57	SR 111 Truck south / SR 66 Truck south (Third Street)	Northern terminus of SR 111 Truck; western end of SR 66 Truck concurrency
Defiance	Defiance	31.49	50.68	SR 15 / SR 18 / SR 66 (Second Street / Clinton Street) / SR 66 Truck ends	Eastern end of SR 66 Truck concurrency
1.000 mi = 1.609 km; 1.000 km = 0.621 mi: Concurrency terminus

== SR 111 Truck ==
State Route 111 Truck
- Location: Defiance, Ohio
- Length: 1.4 mi (2.3 km)

SR 111 Truck is a truck route which bypasses a low railroad bridge along SR 111 in southwestern Defiance. Beginning at a signalized intersection with South Clinton Street (SR 111) and Downs Street (SR 66 Truck), it and SR 66 Truck head northwest along Deatrick Street passing a supermarket and three sets of railroad tracks at-grade. At Baltimore Street (former SR 424), the two truck routes turn northeast onto Holgate Avenue paralleling the Maumee River. After heading through a residential neighborhood of the city, the road bends to the east and transitions to West Third Street. After passing under a railroad bridge, it passes numerous businesses and city facilities before ending at the intersection of Third Street and Clinton Street (SR 111).
