= McClure, Ohio =

- Village
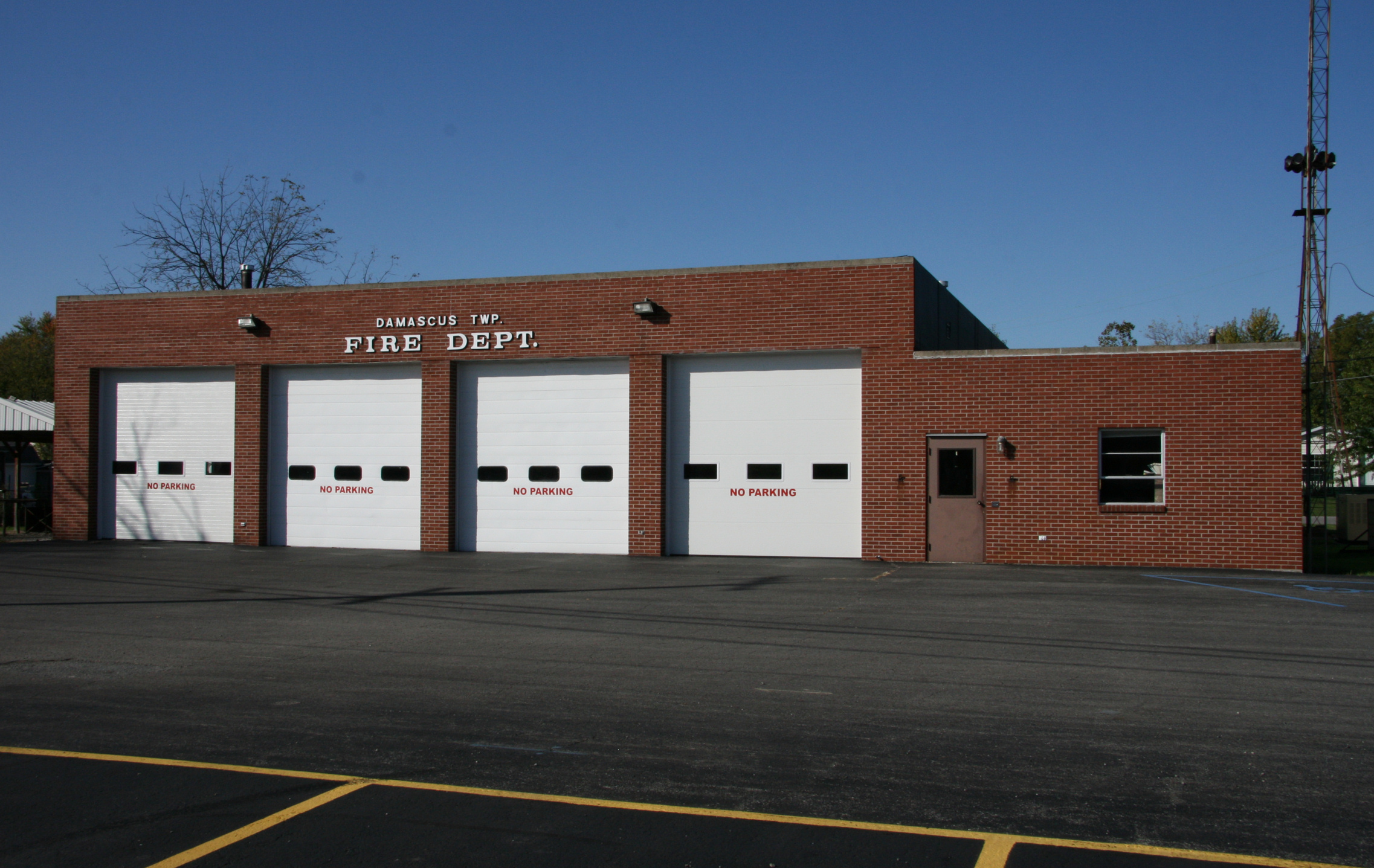
- Fire department

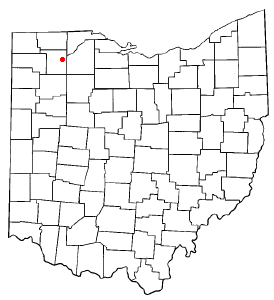
- Location of McClure, Ohio

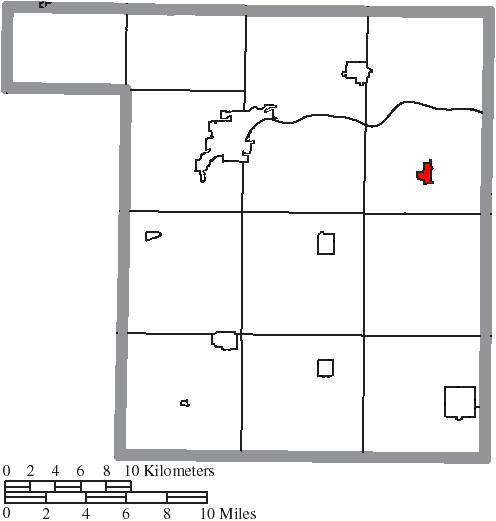
- Location of McClure in Henry County
- Coordinates: 41°22′26″N 83°56′25″W
- Country: United States
- State: Ohio
- County: Henry

Government
  - Type: Village Council

Area
  - Total: 0.50 sq mi (1.29 km^{2})
  - Land: 0.50 sq mi (1.29 km^{2})
  - Water: 0 sq mi (0.00 km^{2})
- Elevation: 676 ft (206 m)

Population (2020)
  - Total: 700
  - Density: 1,405.4/sq mi (542.63/km^{2})
- Time zone: UTC-5 (Eastern (EST))
  - Summer (DST): UTC-4 (EDT)
- ZIP code: 43534
- Area code: 419
- FIPS code: 39-45794
- GNIS feature ID: 2399285
- Website: https://mcclureoh.org/

McClure is a village in Henry County, Ohio, United States. The population was 700 at the 2020 census.

== History ==
McClure was laid out in the late 1870s, and named after John McClure, an original owner of the town site.

In the 1960s and the first half of the 1970s, McClure had the distinction of being the last place in Ohio with a manual telephone system. Since the installation of the first telephone system in the 1890s, by The Ohio Bell Telephone Co., residents used the same method to signal their town's operator; they turned a crank on their phone. The operator in most cases knew their voice or knew the person being called.

When Ohio Bell refused to run lines to McClure's rural residents, they formed a separate company, with volunteer labor used to build lines connecting the residents. The new company in 1908 bought the Bell equipment, and in 1909 changed its name to the Citizens Mutual Telephone Co. Long Distance calls were routed via Bell System equipment in Napoleon to the toll center in Maumee, and onward.

In the 1940s, the company opened a five-circuit toll line to Bowling Green, replacing the two-line circuit to Napoleon for long distance traffic. In the 1960s, realizing the need to modernize, the Citizens board began to consider selling the company. In February 1968, members of the Citizens Mutual Co. circulated a ballot asking members if they wished to modernize their system. In late 1969, the Citizen's Mutual board voted to be acquired by Otto Miller of Liberty Center. Otto Miller renamed the company to its present name: McClure Telephone Company.

The Ohio Public Utilities Commission approved the $100,000 sale in August 1971. The company spent the next several years building a new central office and running new lines to its nearly 500 subscribers. In November 1975, McClure residents at last gave up their hand-cranked magneto telephones.

== Geography ==
According to the United States Census Bureau, the village has a total area of 0.50 square miles (1.29 km^{2}), all land.

== Demographics ==
Historical population
Census	Pop.	Note	%±
1890	332		—
1900	650		95.8%
1910	547		−15.8%
1920	433		−20.8%
1930	435		0.5%
1940	467		7.4%
1950	506		8.4%
1960	651		28.7%
1970	699		7.4%
1980	694		−0.7%
1990	781		12.5%
2000	761		−2.6%
2010	725		−4.7%
2020	700		−3.4%
U.S. Decennial Census

=== 2010 census ===
As of the census of 2010, there were 725 people, 288 households, and 196 families residing in the village. The population density was 1,450.0 inhabitants per square mile (559.8/km^{2}). There were 319 housing units at an average density of 638.0 per square mile (246.3/km^{2}). The racial makeup of the village was 96.1% White, 0.1% African American, 0.1% Native American, 0.4% Asian, 2.2% from other races, and 1.0% from two or more races. Hispanic or Latino of any race were 7.3% of the population.

There were 288 households, of which 36.8% had children under the age of 18 living with them, 50.7% were married couples living together, 12.2% had a female householder with no husband present, 5.2% had a male householder with no wife present, and 31.9% were non-families. 25.3% of all households were made up of individuals, and 9% had someone living alone who was 65 years of age or older. The average household size was 2.52 and the average family size was 2.98.

The median age in the village was 37.4 years. 26.5% of residents were under the age of 18; 7.6% were between the ages of 18 and 24; 24.6% were from 25 to 44; 30.3% were from 45 to 64; and 10.9% were 65 years of age or older. The gender makeup of the village was 50.1% male and 49.9% female.

=== 2000 census ===
As of the census of 2000, there were 761 people, 285 households, and 208 families residing in the village. The population density was 1,539.5 inhabitants per square mile (594.4/km^{2}). There were 308 housing units at an average density of 623.1 per square mile (240.6/km^{2}). The racial makeup of the village was 96.58% White, 0.13% Native American, 0.26% Asian, 1.71% from other races, and 1.31% from two or more races. Hispanic or Latino of any race were 4.73% of the population.

There were 285 households, out of which 35.1% had children under the age of 18 living with them, 63.2% were married couples living together, 7.4% had a female householder with no husband present, and 26.7% were non-families. 21.4% of all households were made up of individuals, and 8.1% had someone living alone who was 65 years of age or older. The average household size was 2.67 and the average family size was 3.11.

In the village, the population was spread out, with 26.3% under the age of 18, 10.9% from 18 to 24, 28.8% from 25 to 44, 20.8% from 45 to 64, and 13.3% who were 65 years of age or older. The median age was 36 years. For every 100 females there were 100.3 males. For every 100 females age 18 and over, there were 96.8 males.

The median income for a household in the village was $40,982, and the median income for a family was $44,375. Males had a median income of $34,792 versus $21,250 for females. The per capita income for the village was $16,433. About 4.7% of families and 7.9% of the population were below the poverty line, including 12.9% of those under age 18 and 1.1% of those age 65 or over.
