= Ohio State Route 500 =

State highway in Paulding County, Ohio, US

State Route 500

Route information
- Maintained by ODOT
- Length: 13.32 mi (21.44 km)
- Existed: 1937–present

Major junctions
- West end: State Line Road near Payne
- East end: SR 111 in Paulding

Location
- Country: United States
- State: Ohio
- Counties: Paulding

Highway system
- Ohio State Highway System; Interstate; US; State; Scenic
← I-490	→ SR 501

State Route 500 (SR 500) is a 13.32-mile-long (21.44 km) Ohio State Route that runs between the Indiana state line and Paulding in the US state of Ohio. None of the highway is listed on the National Highway System. Most of the route is a rural two-lane highway and passes through both farmland and residential properties. For much of its path, SR 500 runs generally parallel to the north of Flatrock Creek.

The highway was first signed in 1937 on much of the same alignment as today. SR 500 replaced the SR 194 designation of the highway which dated back to 1923; SR 194 ran between Payne and Paulding. Some of the highway was paved in 1937, with the rest of the route being paved in 1951.

== Route description ==
SR 500 begins at an intersection with county-maintained State Line Road and Paulding Road on the Indiana state line in western Benton Township. The highway heads northeast as a two-lane highway passing through farmland, with a few houses. The route turns east, then bends back to the northeast. At this point, Flatrock Creek appears close to the south side of the roadway, resulting in that side of the highway becoming primarily wooded, while the north side of the highway remains bounded by farmland. The route arrives at a T-intersection with SR 49 on the southern boundary of Payne. At this point, it joins SR 49 heading north into the village along Main Street through a primarily residential area.

The road arrives at a traffic signal where it meets SR 613 (Townline Street). This highway comes into the intersection from the west, and joins SR 49 and SR 500 going north for two blocks along Main Street into downtown Payne. At that point, the concurrency hits a signalized intersection with Merrin Street and SR 500 and SR 613 turn to the east, while SR 49 continues heading north. East of SR 49, the SR 500 and SR 613 concurrency goes through the central business district and then into a residential neighborhood. The highway briefly jogs north via Maple Street before turning east-southeasterly onto Orchard Street, which it follows through the eastern portion of Payne. While the north side of the street is bounded by homes, the south side becomes wooded as Flatrock Creek reappears nearby.

The route curves to the northeast at the County Road 47 (CR 47) intersection and, upon crossing a set of railroad tracks, departs Payne. Now traveling through Harrison Township, the routes travel past rows of houses on each side of the highway before emerging into a landscape of farmland. Woods then appear along both sides of the roadway a short distance before SR 613 turns off to the east from SR 500, which continues in an east-northeasterly fashion. The route proceeds into Paulding Township passing a mix of farmland and houses, with forested land appearing along the south side at intervals where Flatrock Creek passes close to the highway. At CR 132, the highway turns north for a short distance, passing along the west side of the campus of Paulding County Hospital just prior to its endpoint at SR 111 in the westernmost part of Paulding. Continuing north after SR 500 ends is CR 103.

There is no section of SR 500 that is included as a part of the National Highway System. The highway is maintained by the Ohio Department of Transportation (ODOT) like all other state routes in the state. The department tracks the traffic volumes along all state highways as a part of its maintenance responsibilities using a metric called average annual daily traffic (AADT). This measurement is a calculation of the traffic level along a segment of roadway for any average day of the year. In 2012, ODOT figured that the lowest traffic levels were present on the section that is west of SR 49, where only 410 vehicles used the highway daily. The peak traffic volume was 2,830 vehicles AADT along a section of SR 500 at is concurrent with SR 49 and SR 613.

== History ==
In 1923, SR 500 was signed as SR 194 northeast from Payne to Paulding and west of Payne was a county road. SR 194 was decommissioned in 1927 leaving the route that later became SR 500 as a county road. The commissioning of SR 500 took place in 1937, and replaced a county road west of Payne, while east of Payne it replaced the former route of SR 194. The highway had a gravel surface between the Indiana state line and SR 49, while between SR 49 and its eastern terminus at SR 111 it was paved. In 1951, the westernmost portion of SR 500 between the Indiana state line and SR 49 was paved. By 1955, SR 113, now SR 613, was rerouted to be concurrent with SR 500 northeast of Payne to the current eastern split of the two routes. No significant changes have taken place to this state route since 1955.

== Major intersections ==
The entire route is in Paulding County.

Location	mi	km	Destinations	Notes
Benton Township	0.00	0.00	Paulding Road / State Line Road	Indiana state line
Payne	4.81	7.74	SR 49 south	Southern end of SR 49 concurrency
Payne	5.10	8.21	SR 613 west (Townline Street)	Western end of SR 613 concurrency
Payne	5.23	8.42	SR 49 north (North Main Street) / West Merrin Street	Northern end of SR 49 concurrency
Harrison Township	7.18	11.56	SR 613 east / CR 94 – Latty	Eastern end of SR 613 concurrency
Paulding	13.32	21.44	SR 111 / CR 103 – Paulding	Eastern terminus of SR 500
1.000 mi = 1.609 km; 1.000 km = 0.621 mi: Concurrency terminus
