= Ohio State Route 637 =

State highway in Van Wert and Paulding Counties, Ohio, US

State Route 637

Route information
- Maintained by ODOT
- Length: 23.16 mi (37.27 km)
- Existed: 1937–present

Major junctions
- South end: US 224 near Van Wert
- North end: SR 66 near Arthur

Location
- Country: United States
- State: Ohio
- Counties: Van Wert, Paulding

Highway system
- Ohio State Highway System; Interstate; US; State; Scenic
← SR 636	→ SR 638

State Route 637 (SR 637) is a 26.13-mile (42.05 km) state route that runs between U.S. Route 224 (US 224) and Arthur in the US state of Ohio. Most of the route is a rural two-lane highway and passes through farmland. The highway was first signed in 1937 on much the same alignment as today, only reaching as far north as an intersection with SR 111. Some of the highway was paved in 1939, with the rest of the route being paved in 1948. SR 637 was extended in 1983, to an intersection with SR 66.

== Route description ==
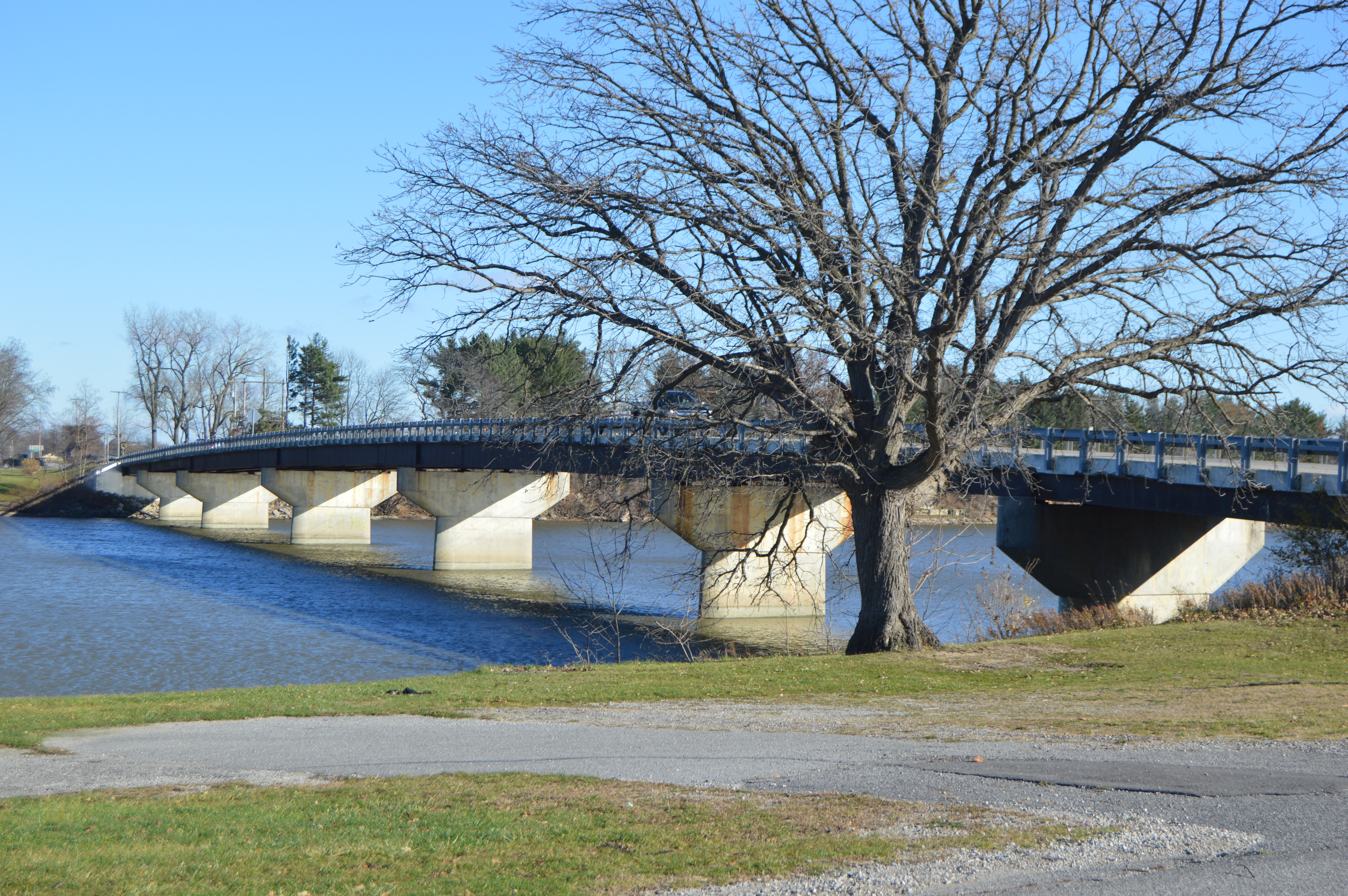
Auglaize River bridge

SR 637 begins at an intersection with U.S. Route 224 (US 224) in rural Van Wert County. The route heads north as a two-lane highway passing through farmland, with a few houses. The road enters Grover Hill, passing through residential properties and has an intersection with SR 114. The highway leaves Grover Hill and passes through farmland in rural Paulding County. The route has an at-grade crossing with Norfolk Southern Railroad tracks. After the tracks is an intersection with SR 613, in rural Jackson Township, Paulding County. North of SR 613, the highway passes through farmland, with some woodland. The route crosses the Flatrock Creek and begins a concurrency with SR 111. The concurrency heads east and enters the community of Junction. In Junction SR 111 turns northeast and SR 637 continues due east. The route crosses over the Auglaize River and passes through farmland. The northern terminus of SR 637 is at an intersection with SR 66, west of Arthur.

SR 637 is not part of the National Highway System, a system of routes important to the nation's economy, mobility and defense. The highway is maintained by the Ohio Department of Transportation (ODOT). ODOT's 2009 annual average daily traffic (AADT) calculations showed that the lowest traffic levels were present on the section that is between Paulding County Road 60 (Matson Road) and SR 613, where only 870 vehicles used the highway daily; the peak traffic volumes were 2,630 vehicles AADT along a section of SR 637 that is concurrent with SR 111.

== History ==
In 1937, SR 637 was commissioned, between US 224 and SR 111, following the same path as today. A section of highway between SR 114 and SR 613 was paved in 1939. The rest of the highway was paved in 1948. In 1983, SR 637 was reroute to run concurrent with SR 111 east into Junction and end at SR 66, west of Arthur. No significant changes have taken place to this state route since 1983.

== Major intersections ==
County	Location	mi	km	Destinations	Notes
Van Wert	Jackson–Hoaglin township line	0.00	0.00	US 224 – Van Wert, Ottawa	Southern terminus of SR 637
Paulding	Grover Hill	6.01	9.67	SR 114	
Paulding	Jackson Township	11.05	17.78	SR 613	
Paulding	Junction	18.13	29.18	SR 111 west	Western end of SR 111 concurrency
Paulding	Junction	19.57	31.49	SR 111 east	Eastern end of SR 111 concurrency
Paulding	Brown Township	23.16	37.27	SR 66	Northern terminus of SR 637
1.000 mi = 1.609 km; 1.000 km = 0.621 mi: Concurrency terminus
