= Latty =

Latty may refer to:

== Places ==
- Latty, Missouri, United States
- Latty, Ohio, United States
- Latty Township, Paulding County, Ohio, United States

== People ==
- Thierry Latty-Fairweather (born 2002), English footballer
- Vivalyn Latty-Scott (1939–2021), Jamaican cricketer
- Yvonne Latty, American journalist, writer, and academic
