= Worstville, Ohio =

Unincorporated community in Ohio, U.S.

Coordinates: 41°04′54″N 84°40′14″W

Worstville is an unincorporated community in Paulding County, in the U.S. state of Ohio.

== History ==
A post office was established at Worstville in 1882, and remained in operation until it was discontinued in 1904. Worstville has been noted for its unusual place name.
