= Blue Creek Township, Ohio =

Township in Ohio, US

- Township
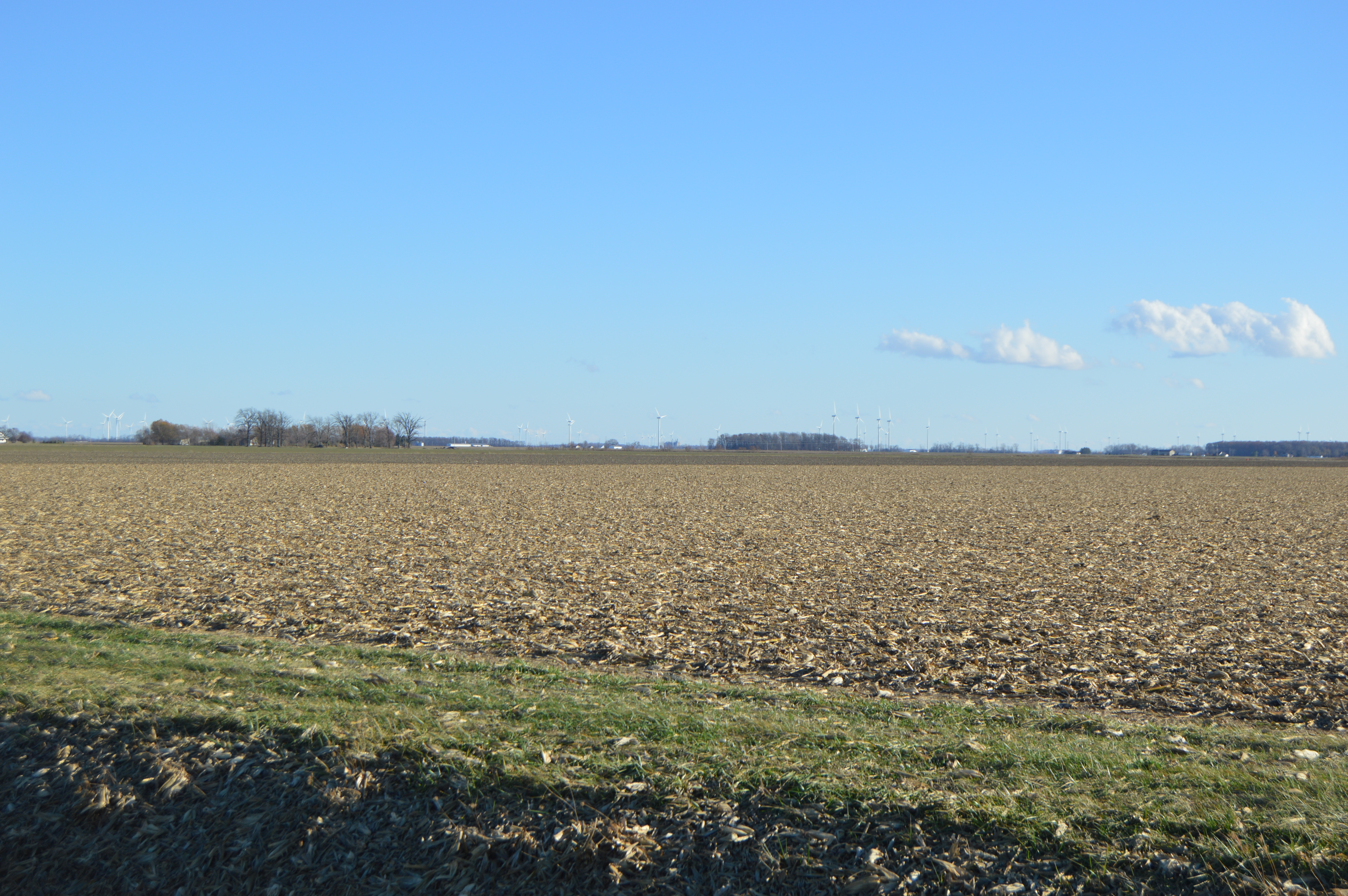
- Fields in the northern part of the township

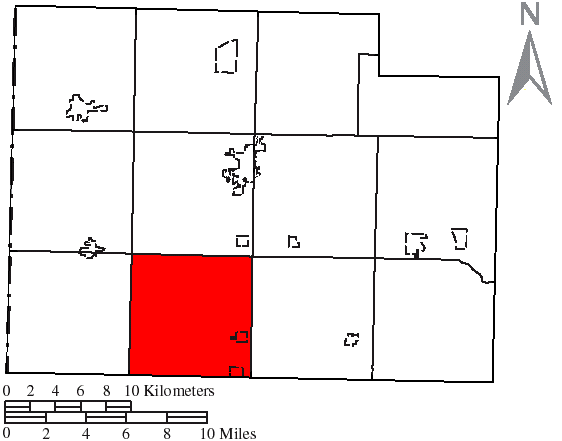
- Location of Blue Creek Township in Paulding County
- Coordinates: 41°1′18″N 84°37′12″W
- Country: United States
- State: Ohio
- County: Paulding

Area
  - Total: 36.2 sq mi (93.8 km^{2})
  - Land: 36.2 sq mi (93.8 km^{2})
  - Water: 0 sq mi (0.0 km^{2})
- Elevation: 738 ft (225 m)

Population (2020)
  - Total: 700
  - Density: 19/sq mi (7.5/km^{2})
- Time zone: UTC-5 (Eastern (EST))
  - Summer (DST): UTC-4 (EDT)
- FIPS code: 39-07370
- GNIS feature ID: 1086768

Blue Creek Township is one of the twelve townships of Paulding County, Ohio, United States. The 2020 census found 700 people in the township.

== Geography ==
Located in the southern part of the county, it borders the following townships:

- Paulding Township - north
- Jackson Township - northeast corner
- Latty Township - east
- Hoaglin Township, Van Wert County - southeast corner
- Union Township, Van Wert County - south
- Tully Township, Van Wert County - southwest corner
- Benton Township - west
- Harrison Township - northwest corner

Two villages are located in Blue Creek Township: Haviland in the eastern part of the township, and part of Scott in the southeastern part of the township along the border with Van Wert County.

== Name and history ==
It is the only Blue Creek Township statewide.

== Government ==
The township is governed by a three-member board of trustees, who are elected in November of odd-numbered years to a four-year term beginning on the following January 1. Two are elected in the year after the presidential election and one is elected in the year before it. There is also an elected township fiscal officer, who serves a four-year term beginning on April 1 of the year after the election, which is held in November of the year before the presidential election. Vacancies in the fiscal officership or on the board of trustees are filled by the remaining trustees.
