= USS LCI(L)-93 =

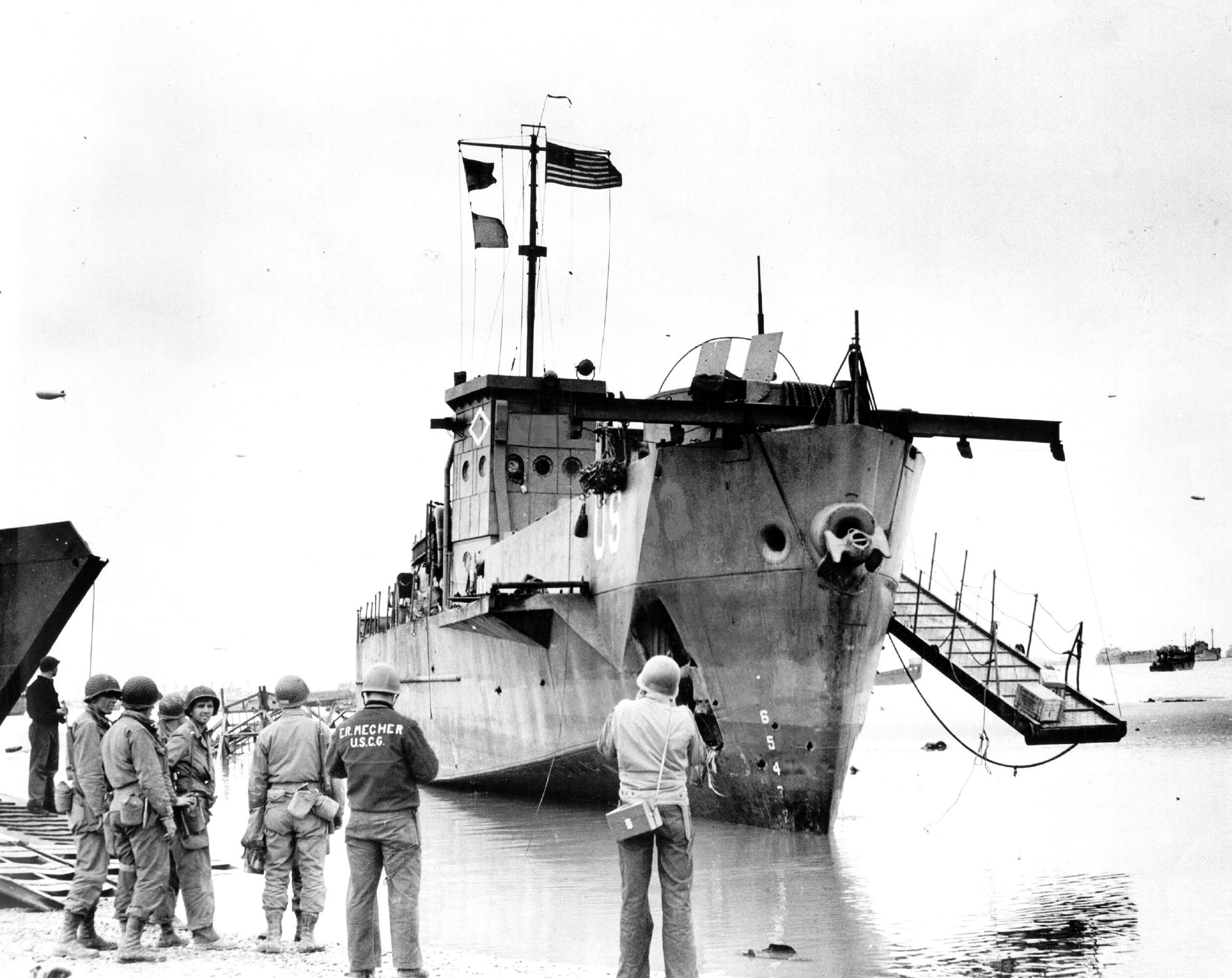
- LCI(L)-93 abandoned on Omaha Beach

History

United States
- Name: USS LCI(L)-93
- Builder: Consolidated Steel Corporation; Orange, Texas
- Laid down: December 1942
- Launched: January 1943
- Commissioned: 15 February 1943
- Stricken: Unknown
- Honors and awards: 4 battle stars, World War II
- Fate: Lost in action on Omaha Beach during D-Day

General characteristics
- Class & type: LCI(L)-351-class large landing craft
- Displacement: 216 t.(light), 234 t.(landing), 389 t.(loaded)
- Length: 158 ft 5.5 in (48.298 m)
- Beam: 23 ft 3 in (7.09 m)
- Draft: Light, 3 ft 1.5 in (0.953 m) mean; Landing, 2 ft 8 in (0.81 m) fwd, 4 ft 10 in (1.47 m) aft; Loaded, 5 ft 4 in (1.63 m) fwd, 5 ft 11 in (1.80 m) aft
- Propulsion: 2 sets of 4 General Motors diesels, 4 per shaft, BHP 1,600, twin variable pitch propellers
- Speed: 16 knots (30 km/h) (max.); 14 knots (26 km/h) maximum continuous
- Endurance: 4,000 miles at 12 knots, loaded, 500 miles at 15 knots; and 110 tons of fuel
- Capacity: 75 tons cargo
- Troops: 6 Officers, 182 Enlisted
- Complement: 3 officers, 21 enlisted
- Armament: 4 × 20 mm AA guns; 2 × .50" machine guns
- Armor: 2" plastic splinter protection on gun turrets, conning tower, and pilot house

USS LCI(L)-93 was an amphibious assault ship (Landing Craft Infantry – Large), commissioned in 1943 by the United States Coast Guard. It participated in the Operation Husky Landings in Sicily on 10 July 1943, as well as the landings at Salerno, Italy.

== Normandy Invasion ==
As part of the massive amphibious force created for The Normandy Invasion, LCI(L)-93 took part in the landings at Omaha Beach on D-Day, 6 June 1944. After offloading its second cargo of American troops, the vessel became stranded between the shore and a sandbar. German Artillery then opened fire on the vulnerable ship, seriously wounding several soldiers and Coast Guardsmen. Among those injured were Stewards Mate 2/c John Roberts, an African American crewman, who lost his leg when an enemy shell passed through a bulkhead.

Badly damaged, LCI(L)-93 was lost as a result of this action.

== In Art and Television ==
In addition to several photographs taken of LCI(L)-93 after the battle, several paintings of Omaha Beach depict the ship under fire on D-Day. The story of LCI(L)-93 was also told in The History Channel documentary A Distant Shore: African Americans of D-Day, with veteran John Roberts recounting his story of the ship's action at Normandy.
