= Broughton, Ohio =

- Village
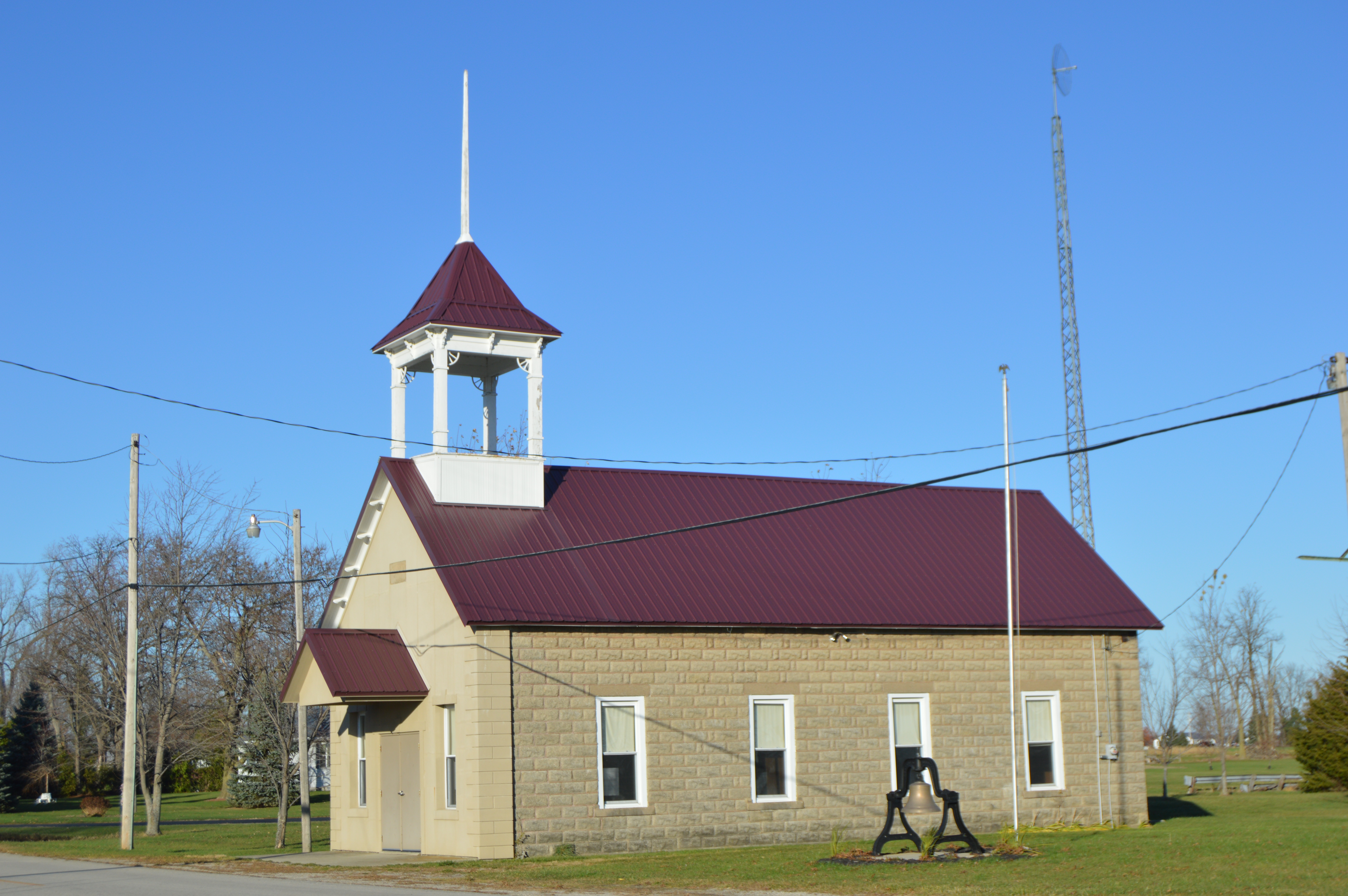
- Town hall

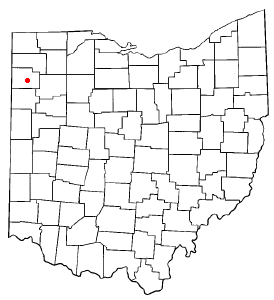
- Location of Broughton, Ohio

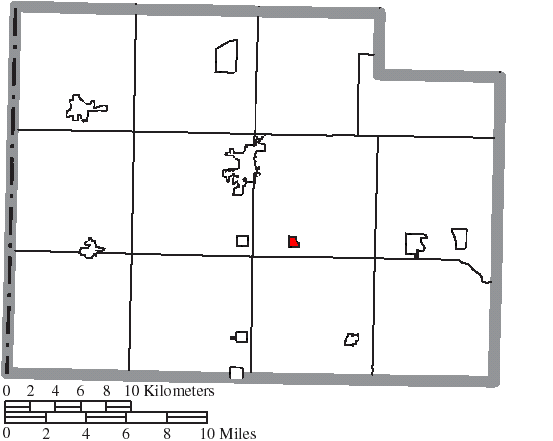
- Location of Broughton in Paulding County
- Coordinates: 41°05′17″N 84°32′06″W
- Country: United States
- State: Ohio
- County: Paulding
- Township: Jackson

Area
  - Total: 0.22 sq mi (0.56 km^{2})
  - Land: 0.22 sq mi (0.56 km^{2})
  - Water: 0 sq mi (0.00 km^{2})
- Elevation: 722 ft (220 m)

Population (2020)
  - Total: 116
  - Estimate (2023): 108
  - Density: 534.1/sq mi (206.23/km^{2})
- Time zone: UTC-5 (Eastern (EST))
  - Summer (DST): UTC-4 (EDT)
- FIPS code: 39-09386
- GNIS feature ID: 2397469

Broughton is a village in Paulding County, Ohio, United States. The population was 116 at the 2020 census.

== Geography ==
According to the United States Census Bureau, the village has a total area of 0.22 square miles (0.57 km^{2}), all land.

== Demographics ==
Historical population
Census	Pop.	Note	%±
1900	226		—
1910	195		−13.7%
1920	111		−43.1%
1930	113		1.8%
1940	131		15.9%
1950	128		−2.3%
1960	153		19.5%
1970	155		1.3%
1980	171		10.3%
1990	151		−11.7%
2000	166		9.9%
2010	120		−27.7%
2020	116		−3.3%
2023 (est.)	108	▼	−6.9%
U.S. Decennial Census

=== 2010 census ===
As of the census of 2010, there were 120 people, 49 households, and 34 families living in the village. The population density was 545.5 inhabitants per square mile (210.6/km^{2}). There were 53 housing units at an average density of 240.9 per square mile (93.0/km^{2}). The racial makeup of the village was 97.5% White, 1.7% Native American, and 0.8% from other races. Hispanic or Latino of any race were 0.8% of the population.

There were 49 households, of which 24.5% had children under the age of 18 living with them, 63.3% were married couples living together, 4.1% had a female householder with no husband present, 2.0% had a male householder with no wife present, and 30.6% were non-families. 20.4% of all households were made up of individuals, and 8.1% had someone living alone who was 65 years of age or older. The average household size was 2.45 and the average family size was 2.88.

The median age in the village was 50.2 years. 15% of residents were under the age of 18; 7.5% were between the ages of 18 and 24; 17.4% were from 25 to 44; 40% were from 45 to 64; and 20% were 65 years of age or older. The gender makeup of the village was 50.0% male and 50.0% female.

=== 2000 census ===
As of the census of 2000, there were 166 people, 57 households, and 45 families living in the village. The population density was 768.2 inhabitants per square mile (296.6/km^{2}). There were 59 housing units at an average density of 273.0 per square mile (105.4/km^{2}). The racial makeup of the village was 96.99% White, 0.60% Native American, 0.60% from other races, and 1.81% from two or more races. Hispanic or Latino of any race were 3.01% of the population.

There were 57 households, out of which 42.1% had children under the age of 18 living with them, 61.4% were married couples living together, 8.8% had a female householder with no husband present, and 19.3% were non-families. 17.5% of all households were made up of individuals, and 7.0% had someone living alone who was 65 years of age or older. The average household size was 2.91 and the average family size was 3.26.

In the village, the population was spread out, with 31.9% under the age of 18, 6.6% from 18 to 24, 34.3% from 25 to 44, 16.9% from 45 to 64, and 10.2% who were 65 years of age or older. The median age was 32 years. For every 100 females there were 112.8 males. For every 100 females age 18 and over, there were 109.3 males.

The median income for a household in the village was $34,375, and the median income for a family was $45,625. Males had a median income of $31,250 versus $16,250 for females. The per capita income for the village was $12,808. About 4.1% of families and 5.8% of the population were below the poverty line, including 5.1% of those under the age of eighteen and none of those 65 or over.
