= Haviland, Ohio =

- Village
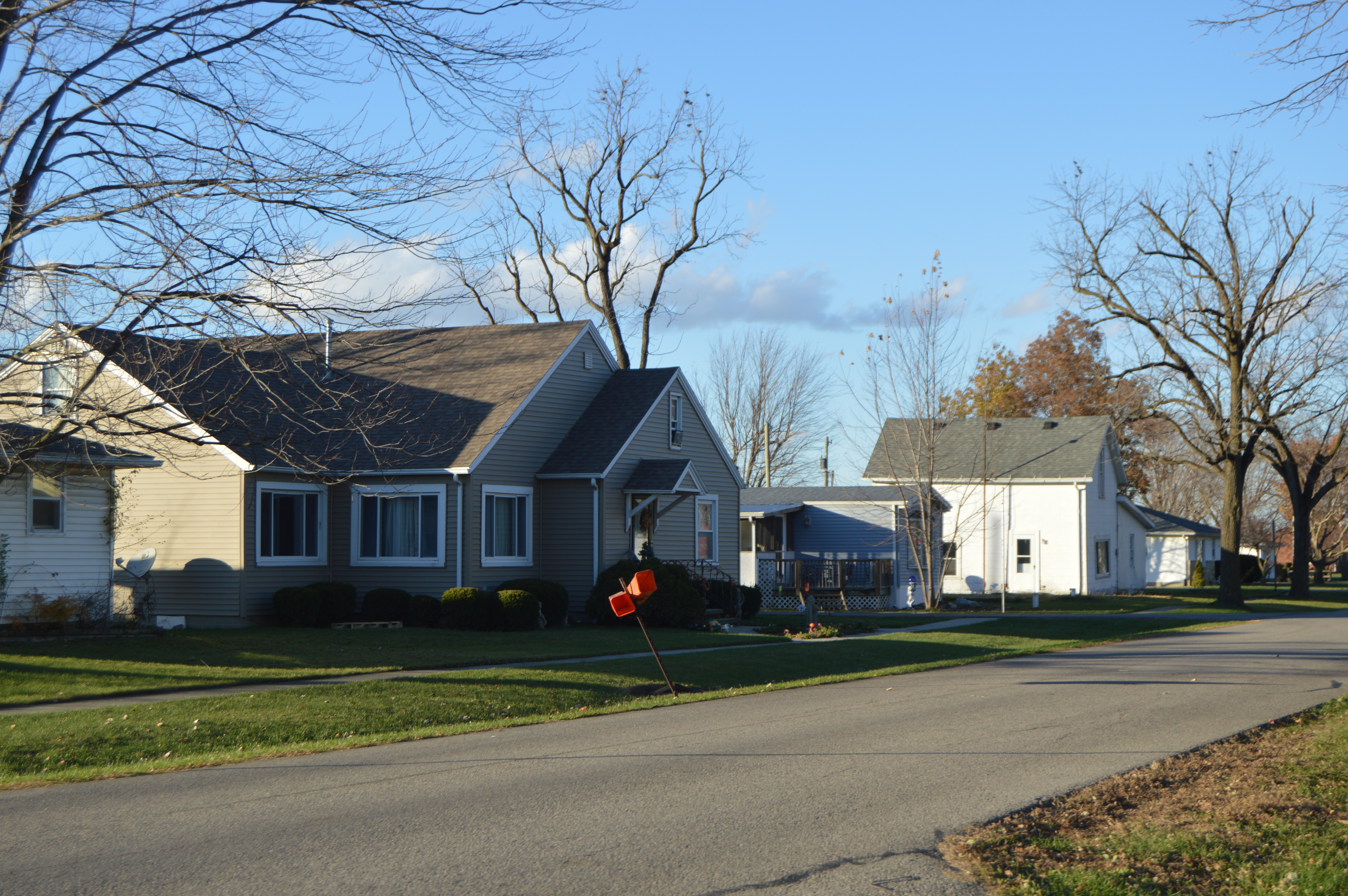
- Houses on McKinley Street

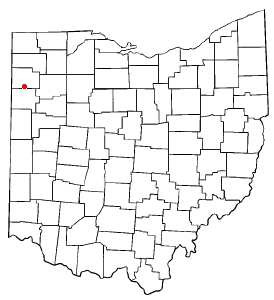
- Location of Haviland, Ohio

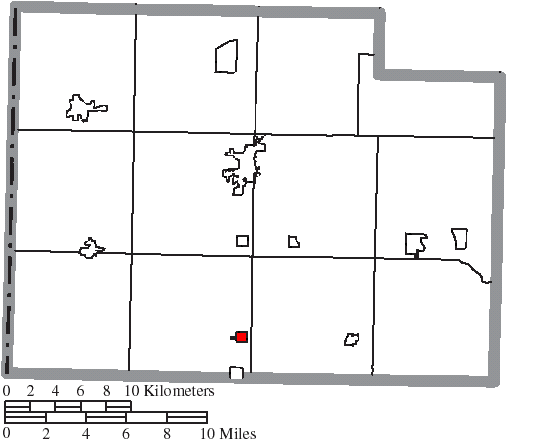
- Location of Haviland in Paulding County
- Coordinates: 41°01′04″N 84°35′07″W
- Country: United States
- State: Ohio
- County: Paulding
- Township: Blue Creek

Area
  - Total: 0.39 sq mi (1.02 km^{2})
  - Land: 0.39 sq mi (1.02 km^{2})
  - Water: 0 sq mi (0.00 km^{2})
- Elevation: 735 ft (224 m)

Population (2020)
  - Total: 160
  - Estimate (2023): 162
  - Density: 407/sq mi (157.1/km^{2})
- Time zone: UTC-5 (Eastern (EST))
  - Summer (DST): UTC-4 (EDT)
- ZIP code: 45851
- Area code: 419
- FIPS code: 39-34552
- GNIS feature ID: 2398266

Haviland is a village in Paulding County, Ohio, United States. The population was 160 at the 2020 census.

== Geography ==
According to the United States Census Bureau, the village has a total area of 0.39 square miles (1.01 km^{2}), all land.

== Demographics ==
Historical population
Census	Pop.	Note	%±
1900	186		—
1910	233		25.3%
1920	270		15.9%
1930	202		−25.2%
1940	210		4.0%
1950	235		11.9%
1960	235		0.0%
1970	231		−1.7%
1980	219		−5.2%
1990	210		−4.1%
2000	180		−14.3%
2010	215		19.4%
2020	160		−25.6%
2023 (est.)	162	▲	1.3%
U.S. Decennial Census

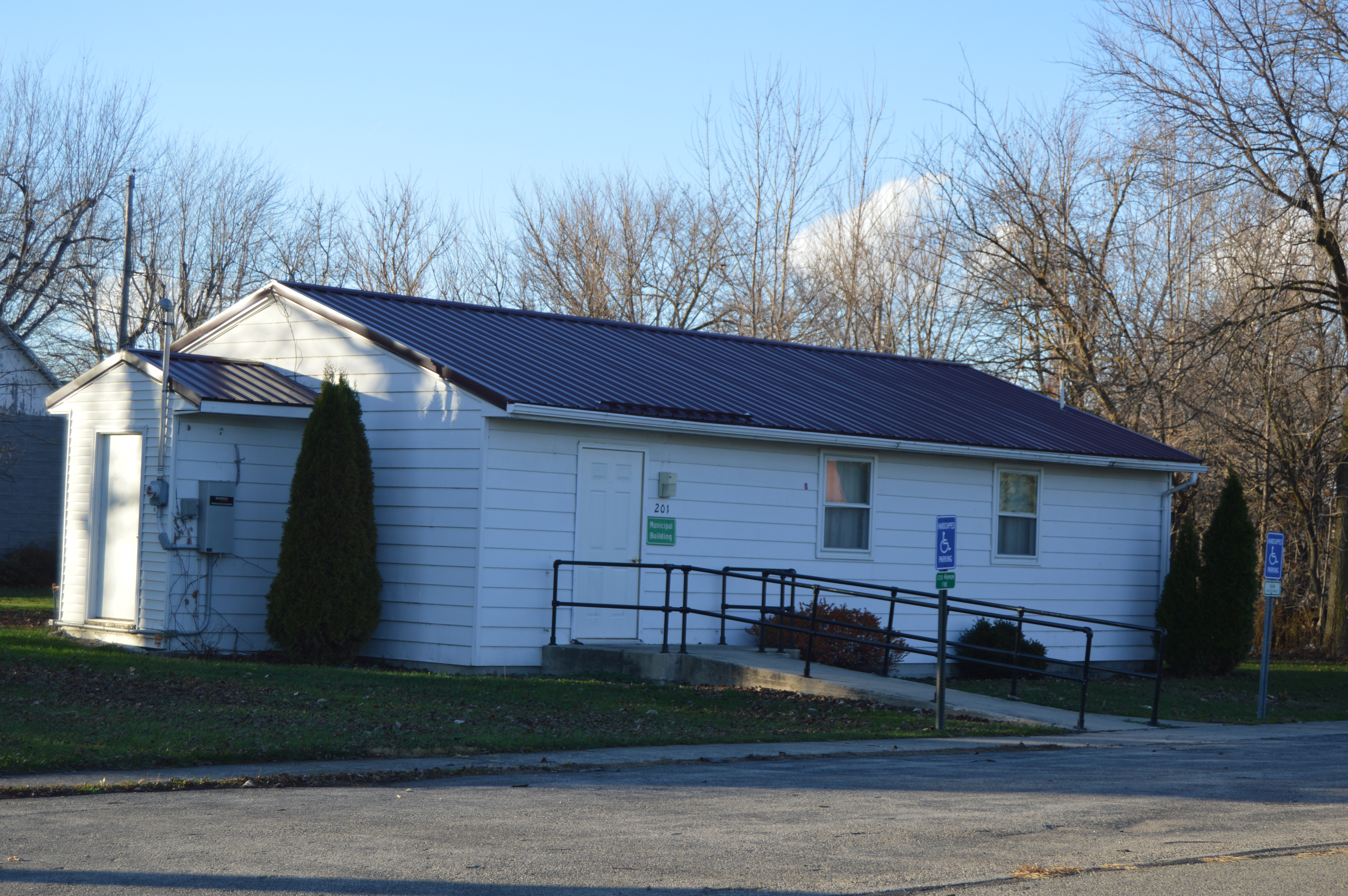
Haviland Municipal Building

=== 2010 census ===
As of the census of 2010, there were 215 people, 79 households, and 57 families living in the village. The population density was 551.3 inhabitants per square mile (212.9/km^{2}). There were 88 housing units at an average density of 225.6 per square mile (87.1/km^{2}). The racial makeup of the village was 96.3% White, 0.5% African American, 2.3% from other races, and 0.9% from two or more races. Hispanic or Latino of any race were 5.6% of the population.

There were 79 households, of which 32.9% had children under the age of 18 living with them, 54.4% were married couples living together, 10.1% had a female householder with no husband present, 7.6% had a male householder with no wife present, and 27.8% were non-families. 19.0% of all households were made up of individuals, and 10.1% had someone living alone who was 65 years of age or older. The average household size was 2.72 and the average family size was 3.02.

The median age in the village was 34.9 years. 26.5% of residents were under the age of 18; 10.3% were between the ages of 18 and 24; 27.4% were from 25 to 44; 22.8% were from 45 to 64; and 13% were 65 years of age or older. The gender makeup of the village was 47.9% male and 52.1% female.

=== 2000 census ===
As of the census of 2000, there were 180 people, 68 households, and 48 families living in the village. The population density was 626.6 inhabitants per square mile (241.9/km^{2}). There were 79 housing units at an average density of 275.0 per square mile (106.2/km^{2}). The racial makeup of the village was 97.78% White, 0.56% African American, 0.56% Native American, 0.56% from other races, and 0.56% from two or more races. Hispanic or Latino of any race were 1.11% of the population.

There were 68 households, out of which 26.5% had children under the age of 18 living with them, 60.3% were married couples living together, 4.4% had a female householder with no husband present, and 29.4% were non-families. 23.5% of all households were made up of individuals, and 10.3% had someone living alone who was 65 years of age or older. The average household size was 2.65 and the average family size was 3.17.

In the village, the population was spread out, with 25.6% under the age of 18, 13.3% from 18 to 24, 24.4% from 25 to 44, 23.3% from 45 to 64, and 13.3% who were 65 years of age or older. The median age was 34 years. For every 100 females there were 102.2 males. For every 100 females age 18 and over, there were 103.0 males.

The median income for a household in the village was $31,607, and the median income for a family was $31,250. Males had a median income of $29,583 versus $26,563 for females. The per capita income for the village was $14,029. About 10.0% of families and 13.1% of the population were below the poverty line, including 14.3% of those under the age of eighteen and none of those 65 or over.
