= A Distant Shore: African Americans of D-Day =

2007 television documentary program

A Distant Shore: African Americans of D-Day is a television documentary program that was produced for the History Channel by Flight 33 Productions in 2007. Executive Producers were Douglas Cohen (Flight 33), Louis Tarantino (Flight 33) and Dolores Gavin (The History Channel). The program was written by Douglas Cohen and produced by Samuel K. Dolan.

A one-hour special, A Distant Shore: African Americans of D-Day told the story of African American soldiers in World War II, who went ashore in France during the 1944 Invasion of Normandy. Among the interviewees were veterans from barrage balloon battalions, quartermaster and transportation companies, and engineers, as well as Coast Guard veteran John Roberts from USS LCI(L)-93, who lost a leg during the landings at Omaha Beach. Author/Historian Yvonne Latty was also interviewed for the program.

== Historical background ==
In the decades leading up to World War II, the United States Army was segregated between white and "colored" units. Before the American Civil War, the Army had very few African American enlisted-men (though many former slaves did serve in the American Revolution), until 1863 when regiments of black soldiers, led by white officers, began taking the field. The system of segregated regiments with white officers continued through the American Indian Wars of the late 19th century, the Spanish–American War, and World War I. Among the more famous segregated units during this period were the 9th and 10th Cavalry Regiments, also known as The Buffalo Soldiers, who along with segregated infantry regiments, engaged the Comanches and Apaches during the Indian Wars of the Southwestern United States.

At the onset of World War II, the Army remained segregated, and with the notable exceptions of units like the 92nd Infantry Division, very few African American soldiers were permitted to serve in Frontline Combat units. Most African American soldiers served as service and supply troops, artillerymen, military police, and in other rear-echelon companies and battalions. However, many of these soldiers did see combat in Europe and the Pacific, particularly those in artillery batteries. Among the units going ashore at Normandy in 1944, was the 320th Anti-Aircraft Barrage Balloon Battalion which did see action on D-Day. Another unit that saw considerable action in Europe was the 761st Tank Battalion, which fought with George S. Patton's Third Army in 1944 and 1945.

Another famous group of African American soldiers were the drivers of the Red Ball Express, who in the months after D-Day kept allied armies supplied with ammo, gas, and food. Many of these troops would volunteer to fall in with their white comrades during the Battle of the Bulge.

The system of segregation in the United States Army would end in 1948, and by the time of the Korean War, African American and white soldiers were serving in the same front line units.

Segregation was also a factor in the U.S. Navy and U.S. Coast Guard. Although white and black sailors had often served on the same vessels since the Age of Sail, African American sailors were generally relegated to the jobs of cooks, stewards, and other labor-intensive duties. This continued through World War II, though it is important to remember that African American sailors acquitted themselves in battle in a number of campaigns.

Before World War II the United States Marine Corps was completely segregated and did not allow African Americans to enlist in its ranks. However, in 1942 the Marines did begin inducting African Americans into segregated units. Many of these Marines would fight in Pacific battles like Iwo Jima.

== The Program ==
Focusing exclusively on the War in Europe and the mobilization for the Normandy Invasion, A Distant Shore follows the accounts of veterans as they made their way through basic training to England, and then prepared for the landings. Stories include incidents of racism encountered at home and overseas, experiences in England, and the terror of battle on the Omaha and Utah Beaches.

== Awards ==
On September 22, 2008, A Distant Shore: African Americans of D-Day received the Emmy Award for Best Historical Programming - Long Form, at the 29th Annual News and Documentary Emmy Awards ceremony in New York. Recipients were Executive Producers Louis Tarantino, Dolores Gavin, Executive Producer and Writer Douglas Cohen, and Producer Samuel K. Dolan.
