= Calvin L. Noble =

American politician (1813–1889)

Personal details
- Born: October 13, 1813 Trumbull County, Ohio, U.S.
- Died: April 10, 1889 (aged 75) Paulding, Ohio, U.S.
- Occupation: Politician; judge; newspaperman; fur trader; agent

Calvin L. Noble (October 13, 1813 – April 10, 1889) was an American politician and judge from Ohio. He served as a member of the Ohio House of Representatives. He is known for changing the spelling of the city of Cleveland from "Cleaveland" to "Cleveland".

== Early life ==
Calvin Noble was born on October 13, 1813, in Trumbull County, Ohio.

Noble learned printing and founded a Democratic newspaper in Cleveland, the Cleveland Advertiser, in 1830, when he was but 17. As the type was too wide for his display head-line he left out one letter and changed the spelling from "Cleaveland" to "Cleveland", and the public adopted the change.

== Career ==
Noble moved to Fort Defiance in September 1833. He was employed as a fur buyer for the American Fur Company, fur being the principal source of revenue in northwestern Ohio at the time. He later became an agent for the American Land Company. He laid out the city of Bryan, Ohio. He also published a newspaper in Defiance.

Noble served in the Ohio House of Representatives, representing the Williams, Defiance, and Paulding counties. He was a county recorder and county commissioner of Williams County. He was the first sheriff of Defiance County and served as probate judge of Paulding County. He was collector of leases of the Miami and Erie Canal for 12 years.

== Personal life ==
Noble married in 1842. He moved to Paulding County in 1858.

Noble died of heart disease on April 10, 1889, in Paulding.

== See also ==
- Howe's Historical Collections of Ohio, by Henry Howe, 1903.
