= Arthur, Ohio =

- Unincorporated community
- Location within Ohio Location within the United States
- Coordinates: 41°11′41″N 84°21′39″W
- Country: United States
- State: Ohio
- County: Paulding
- Elevation: 719 ft (219 m)
- Time zone: UTC-5 (Eastern (EST))
  - Summer (DST): UTC-4 (EDT)
- Area codes: 419 & 567
- GNIS feature ID: 1037493

Arthur is an unincorporated community in Paulding County, Ohio, United States. Arthur is located on Ohio State Route 66, 6.2 miles (10.0 km) south of Defiance.
