= Benton Township, Paulding County, Ohio =

Township in Ohio, US

- Township
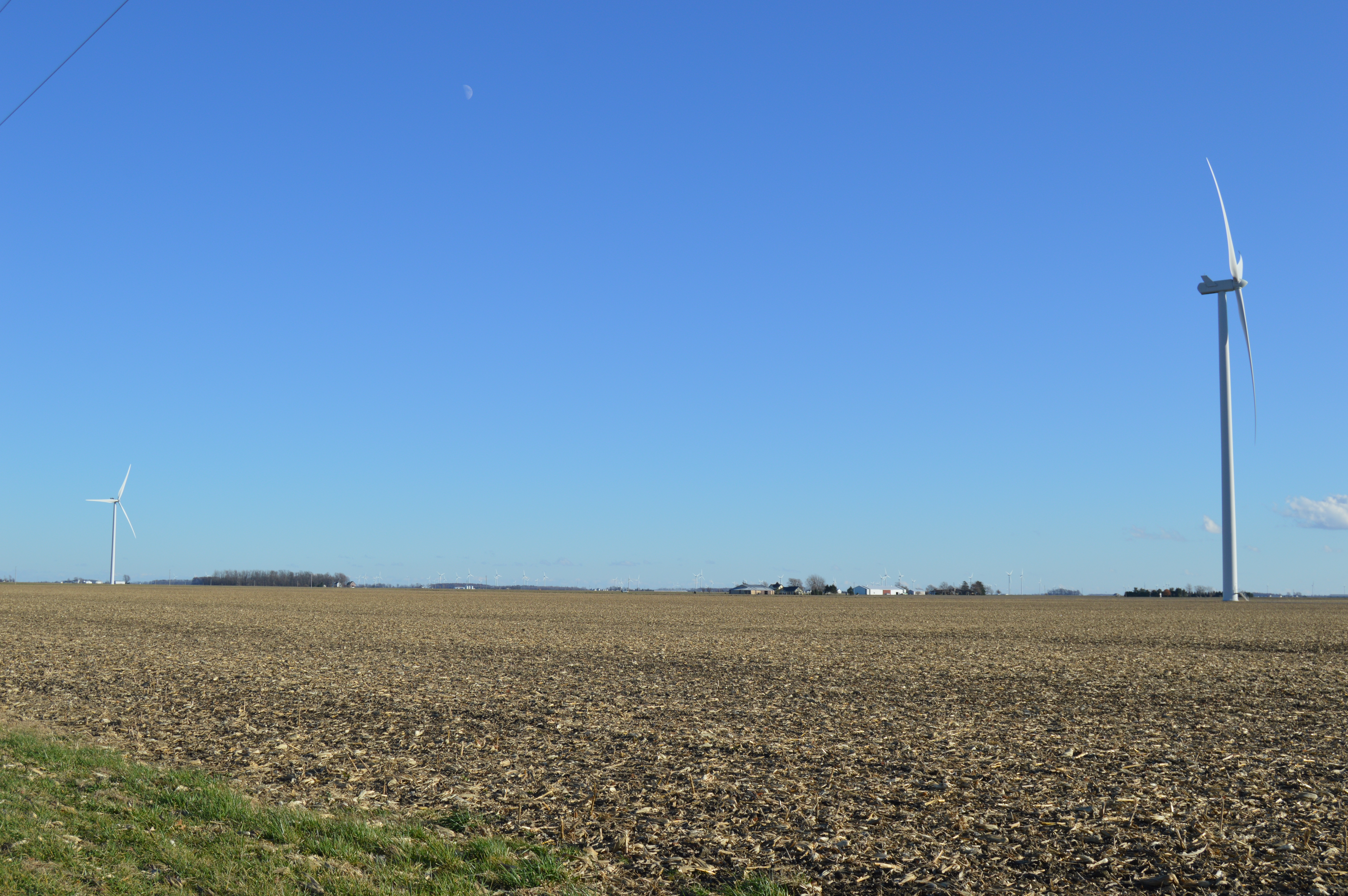
- Wind farm southeast of Payne

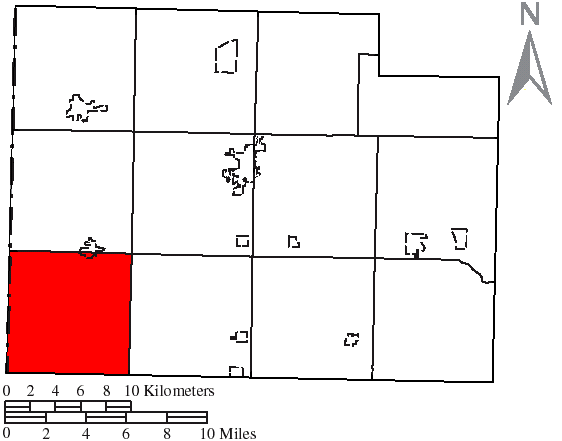
- Location of Benton Township in Paulding County
- Coordinates: 41°2′39″N 84°44′3″W
- Country: United States
- State: Ohio
- County: Paulding

Area
  - Total: 36.5 sq mi (94.6 km^{2})
  - Land: 36.5 sq mi (94.6 km^{2})
  - Water: 0 sq mi (0.0 km^{2})
- Elevation: 745 ft (227 m)

Population (2020)
  - Total: 1,019
  - Density: 27.9/sq mi (10.8/km^{2})
- Time zone: UTC-5 (Eastern (EST))
  - Summer (DST): UTC-4 (EDT)
- FIPS code: 39-05634
- GNIS feature ID: 1086767

Benton Township is one of the twelve townships of Paulding County, Ohio, United States. The 2020 census found 1,019 people in the township.

== Geography ==
Located in the southwestern corner of the county along the Indiana line, it borders the following townships:

- Harrison Township - north
- Paulding Township - northeast corner
- Blue Creek Township - east
- Union Township, Van Wert County - southeast corner
- Tully Township, Van Wert County - south
- Monroe Township, Allen County, Indiana - southwest
- Jackson Township, Allen County, Indiana - west

Part of the village of Payne is located in northern Benton Township along the border with Harrison Township.

== Name and history ==
Statewide, other Benton Townships are located in Hocking, Monroe, Ottawa, and Pike counties.

== Government ==
The township is governed by a three-member board of trustees, who are elected in November of odd-numbered years to a four-year term beginning on the following January 1. Two are elected in the year after the presidential election and one is elected in the year before it. There is also an elected township fiscal officer, who serves a four-year term beginning on April 1 of the year after the election, which is held in November of the year before the presidential election. Vacancies in the fiscal officership or on the board of trustees are filled by the remaining trustees.
