= Junction, Ohio =

- Unincorporated community
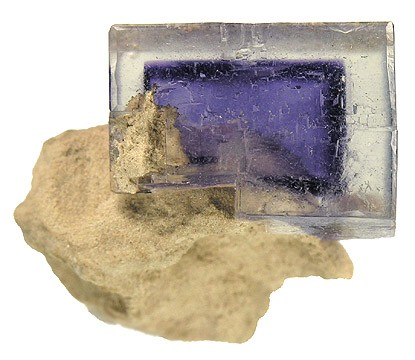
- Fluorite from Stoneco Auglaize quarry near Junction

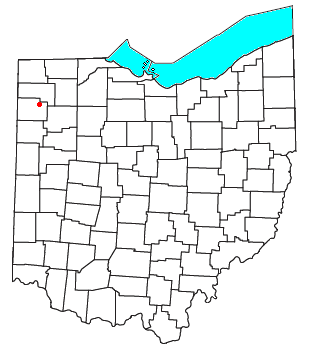
- Location of Junction, Ohio
- Coordinates: 41°11′35″N 84°27′31″W
- Country: United States
- State: Ohio
- County: Paulding
- Township: Auglaize
- Elevation: 712 ft (217 m)
- Time zone: UTC-5 (Eastern (EST))
  - Summer (DST): UTC-4 (EDT)
- GNIS feature ID: 1042164

Junction is an unincorporated community in western Auglaize Township, Paulding County, Ohio, United States. It lies along the concurrent State Routes 111 and 637. The Auglaize River flows along the eastern edge of the community. It is located midway between the village of Paulding, the county seat of Paulding County, and the city of Defiance, the county seat of Defiance County.

== History ==
Junction was so-named because it was the junction between the Wabash and Erie Canal and Miami and Erie Canal. With the construction of the railroad, business activity shifted to other nearby places, and the town's population dwindled.
