= Yvonne Latty =

American journalist, writer, and academic

- Born: Manhattan, New York, United States
- Education: New York University
- Occupations: Journalist and Professor

Yvonne Latty is an American journalist, author, filmmaker and professor at New York University's Arthur L. Carter Journalism Institute. She has traveled the country to speak on subjects including race to writing, and is also a Leeway Foundation Fellow.

Latty is the director of the Reporting The Nation/Reporting New York in Multimedia graduate program at NYU and is the author of two books: We Were There: Voices of African American Veterans From World War II to the War in Iraq (HarperCollins/Amistad, 2004) and In Conflict: Iraq War Veterans Speak Out On Duty, Loss and the Fight To Stay Alive (Polipoint Press, 2006). In Conflict was later developed into an award-winning play. She is also the producer and director of Sacred Poison, a documentary which tells the story of the legacy of uranium mining on the Navajo Nation. It was awarded the David Horowitz Media Award at the 2011 Santa Fe Independent Film Festival.

== Personal and professional life ==
Latty was born to Albert and Ramona Latty. She and her older sister, Margie, grew up in a tenement in New York City's South Harlem neighborhood, which was then overrun by drugs and poverty. The daughter of a Jamaican father and Dominican mother, Latty spent a lot of time on her fire escape, watching stories unfold on the streets below. What she saw and heard sparked her initial interest in telling stories — especially those of the unheard urban poor.

She attended New York University and received a BFA in film–television. After spending a few years as a photographer, she decided to become a writer. Latty received a master's degree in journalism at NYU, and then worked for 13 years as a reporter for the Philadelphia Daily News. There, she was an award-winning journalist specializing in urban issues. Her work has also been featured in USA Today, the Chicago Sun-Times, The Washington Post, CNN, Newsweek, NPR, Fox News, The Philadelphia Inquirer, Detroit Free Press, and the Miami Herald.

After 18 years as a newspaper reporter, Latty began teaching in NYU's journalism program. There, she founded Pavement Pieces, a student-produced news website focused on local and national stories. Pavement Pieces has received two Excellence in Student Journalism Award from the National Lesbian and Gay Journalists Association for work on the LGBT community. and won a host of national awards for a package of the issues facing the Navajo.

In addition to heading the graduate journalism programs for Reporting New York/Reporting the Nation, she was the director of the institute's Urban Journalism Workshop, an intensive multimedia program connecting city high school students to journalism.

She also appeared in two documentaries, the Emmy award-winning A Distant Shore: African Americans of D-Day and Honor Deferred, a History Channel documentary about African Americans serving in World War II.

== Books ==
Latty's first book, We Were There, explores the stories of 28 African-American veterans who served in five wars: World War II, The Korean War, Vietnam, Afghanistan, and Iraq. Latty said it was inspired by hearing her father's own stories of serving in the U.S. Army during World War II. The book eventually became an exhibit at the National Constitution Center in Philadelphia.

In Conflict also features first-hand accounts of American military, with 25 Iraq War veterans from various backgrounds. Each veteran explained in their own words what they experienced during the war and the physical and mental damage they suffered afterward. Once the book was published, Temple University Artistic Director Douglas Wager offered to turn it into a play. In Conflict appeared Off-Broadway at the Barrow Street Theatre in 2008 and enjoyed a warm reception from critics. The play also won the Fringe First award at the Edinburgh Festival Fringe in Scotland.

== Controversies ==
In 2006, Latty wrote a USA Today criticizing the lack of African-American Marines in Clint Eastwood's films about Iwo Jima. She was misquoted by Time Magazine, claiming she said that "blacks had the most dangerous job in Iwo Jima." Her work attracted the attention of director Spike Lee, who asked her to speak on the subject over the summer in advance of his own World War II film, Miracle at St. Anna.

In Conflict inspired a Connecticut high school teacher to develop a play based on the book. Her drama students produced the play, titled Voices in Conflict, as a class project. But the school's principal deemed the play too controversial and all performances were canceled. This story was picked up by The New York Times, and the students received widespread support, including from soldiers serving in Iraq. Several New York theaters then offered to present public performances of the work.
