= Jackson Township, Paulding County, Ohio =

Township in Ohio, US

- Township
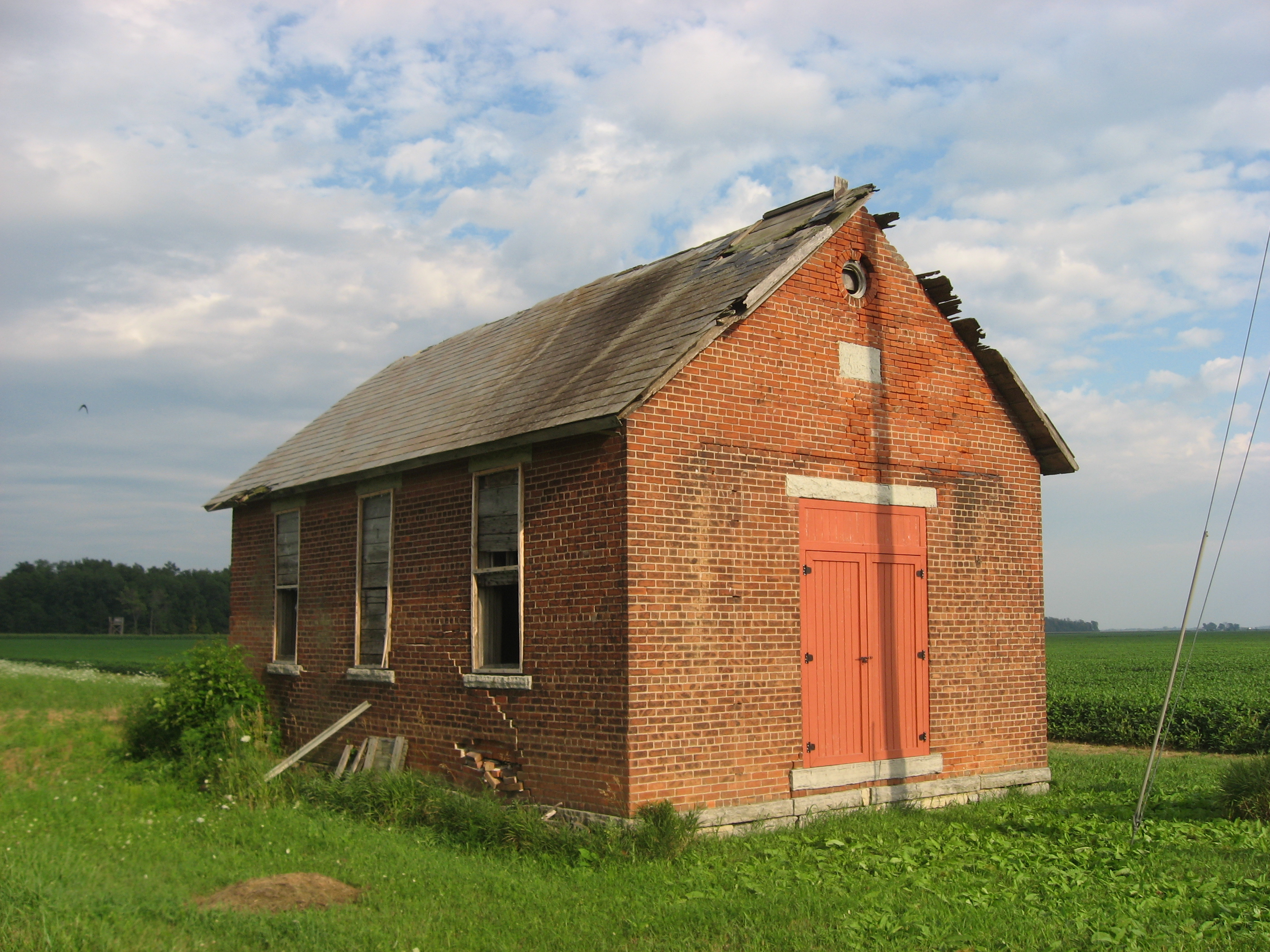
- Abandoned school in the township's northwest

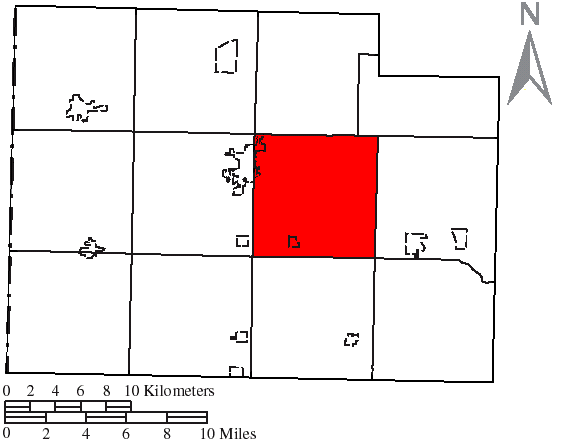
- Location of Jackson Township in Paulding County
- Coordinates: 41°7′3″N 84°31′30″W
- Country: United States
- State: Ohio
- County: Paulding

Area
  - Total: 36.8 sq mi (95.4 km^{2})
  - Land: 36.8 sq mi (95.2 km^{2})
  - Water: 0.039 sq mi (0.1 km^{2})
- Elevation: 720 ft (220 m)

Population (2020)
  - Total: 1,773
  - Density: 48/sq mi (18.6/km^{2})
- Time zone: UTC-5 (Eastern (EST))
  - Summer (DST): UTC-4 (EDT)
- FIPS code: 39-37954
- GNIS feature ID: 1086774

Jackson Township is one of the twelve townships of Paulding County, Ohio, United States. The 2020 census found 1,773 people in the township.

== Geography ==
Located in the central part of the county, it borders the following townships:

- Emerald Township - north
- Auglaize Township - northeast
- Brown Township - east
- Washington Township - southeast corner
- Latty Township - south
- Blue Creek Township - southwest corner
- Paulding Township - west
- Crane Township - northwest corner

Two villages are located in Jackson Township: a slight portion of Paulding, the county seat and largest village of Paulding County, in the northwest; and Broughton in the southwest.

It is one of two county townships (the other being Paulding Township) without a border on any other county.

== Name and history ==
It is one of thirty-seven Jackson Townships statewide.

== Government ==
The township is governed by a three-member board of trustees, who are elected in November of odd-numbered years to a four-year term beginning on the following January 1. Two are elected in the year after the presidential election and one is elected in the year before it. There is also an elected township fiscal officer, who serves a four-year term beginning on April 1 of the year after the election, which is held in November of the year before the presidential election. Vacancies in the fiscal officership or on the board of trustees are filled by the remaining trustees.
