= Grover Hill, Ohio =

- Village
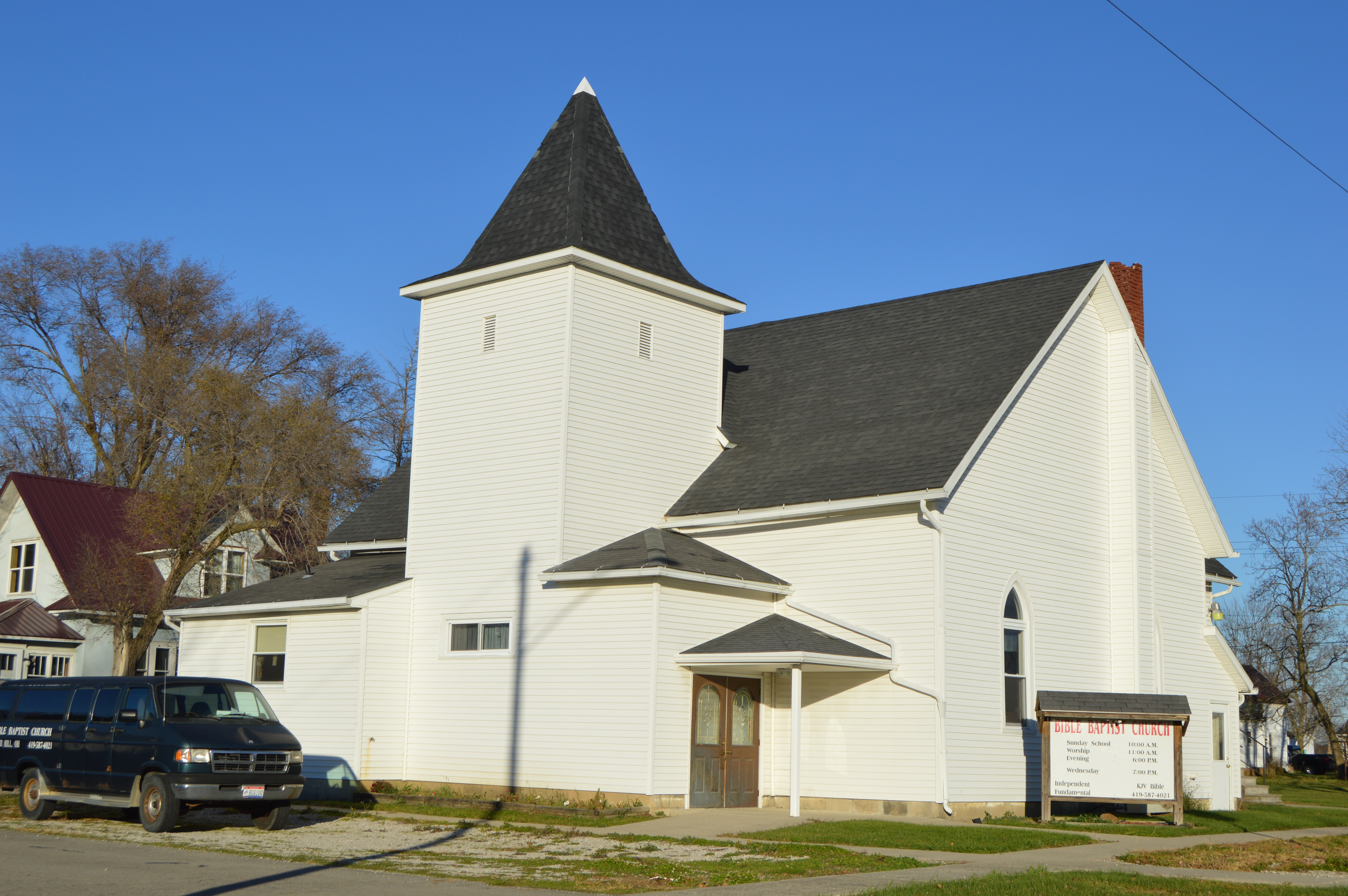
- Bible Baptist Church

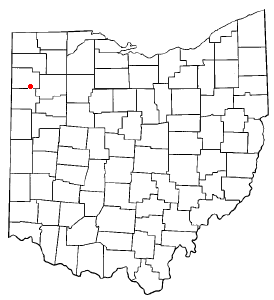
- Location of Grover Hill, Ohio

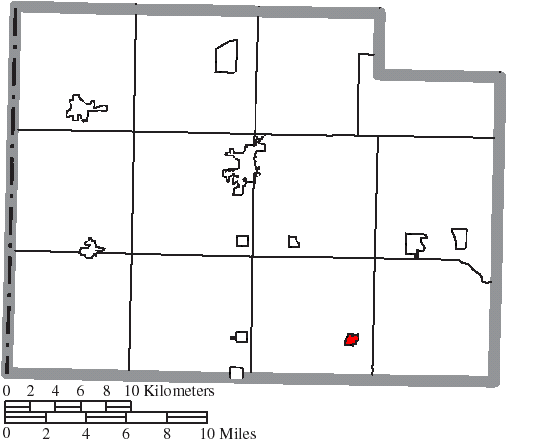
- Location of Grover Hill in Paulding County
- Coordinates: 41°01′08″N 84°28′39″W
- Country: United States
- State: Ohio
- County: Paulding
- Township: Latty

Area
  - Total: 0.27 sq mi (0.71 km^{2})
  - Land: 0.27 sq mi (0.71 km^{2})
  - Water: 0 sq mi (0.00 km^{2})
- Elevation: 728 ft (222 m)

Population (2020)
  - Total: 382
  - Estimate (2023): 380
  - Density: 1,384/sq mi (534.3/km^{2})
- Time zone: UTC-5 (Eastern (EST))
  - Summer (DST): UTC-4 (EDT)
- ZIP code: 45849
- Area code: 419
- FIPS code: 39-32620
- GNIS feature ID: 2398214

Grover Hill is a village in Paulding County, Ohio, United States. The population was 382 at the 2020 census. The village is named after President Grover Cleveland and congressman W. D. Hill.

== History ==
Grover Hill was a boomtown, created as a stop on the railroad. A comprehensive history of the town and nearby communities was self-published by Laurence R. Hipp, a longtime resident of Grover Hill.

== Geography ==
According to the United States Census Bureau, the village has a total area of 0.28 square miles (0.73 km^{2}), all of which is land.

== Demographics ==
Historical population
Census	Pop.	Note	%±
1900	655		—
1910	676		3.2%
1920	530		−21.6%
1930	414		−21.9%
1940	478		15.5%
1950	463		−3.1%
1960	547		18.1%
1970	536		−2.0%
1980	486		−9.3%
1990	518		6.6%
2000	412		−20.5%
2010	402		−2.4%
2020	382		−5.0%
2023 (est.)	380	▼	−0.5%
U.S. Decennial Census

=== 2010 census ===
As of the census of 2010, there were 402 people, 159 households, and 110 families residing in the village. The population density was 1,435.7 inhabitants per square mile (554.3/km^{2}). There were 183 housing units at an average density of 653.6 per square mile (252.4/km^{2}). The racial makeup of the village was 98.5% White, 0.2% African American, and 1.2% from two or more races. Hispanic or Latino of any race were 1.0% of the population.

There were 159 households, of which 34.6% had children under the age of 18 living with them, 52.2% were married couples living together, 12.6% had a female householder with no husband present, 4.4% had a male householder with no wife present, and 30.8% were non-families. 25.8% of all households were made up of individuals, and 11.3% had someone living alone who was 65 years of age or older. The average household size was 2.53 and the average family size was 3.03.

The median age in the village was 37.1 years. 28.6% of residents were under the age of 18; 7.4% were between the ages of 18 and 24; 22.4% were from 25 to 44; 26.6% were from 45 to 64; and 14.9% were 65 years of age or older. The gender makeup of the village was 51.0% male and 49.0% female.

=== 2000 census ===
As of the census of 2000, there were 412 people, 167 households, and 115 families residing in the village. The population density was 1,420.4 inhabitants per square mile (548.4/km^{2}). There were 183 housing units at an average density of 630.9 per square mile (243.6/km^{2}). The racial makeup of the village was 96.12% White, 0.49% African American, 0.24% Native American, 0.73% from other races, and 2.43% from two or more races. Hispanic or Latino of any race were 2.43% of the population.

There were 167 households, out of which 31.7% had children under the age of 18 living with them, 55.7% were married couples living together, 11.4% had a female householder with no husband present, and 31.1% were non-families. 28.7% of all households were made up of individuals, and 12.6% had someone living alone who was 65 years of age or older. The average household size was 2.47 and the average family size was 2.97.

In the village, the population was spread out, with 26.0% under the age of 18, 7.8% from 18 to 24, 29.1% from 25 to 44, 21.8% from 45 to 64, and 15.3% who were 65 years of age or older. The median age was 37 years. For every 100 females there were 93.4 males. For every 100 females age 18 and over, there were 95.5 males.

The median income for a household in the village was $33,750, and the median income for a family was $41,667. Males had a median income of $31,563 versus $22,222 for females. The per capita income for the village was $14,872. About 11.5% of families and 17.7% of the population were below the poverty line, including 31.0% of those under age 18 and 8.8% of those age 65 or over.
