= Paulding Township, Ohio =

Township in Ohio, US

Paulding Township, Paulding County, Ohio
- Township
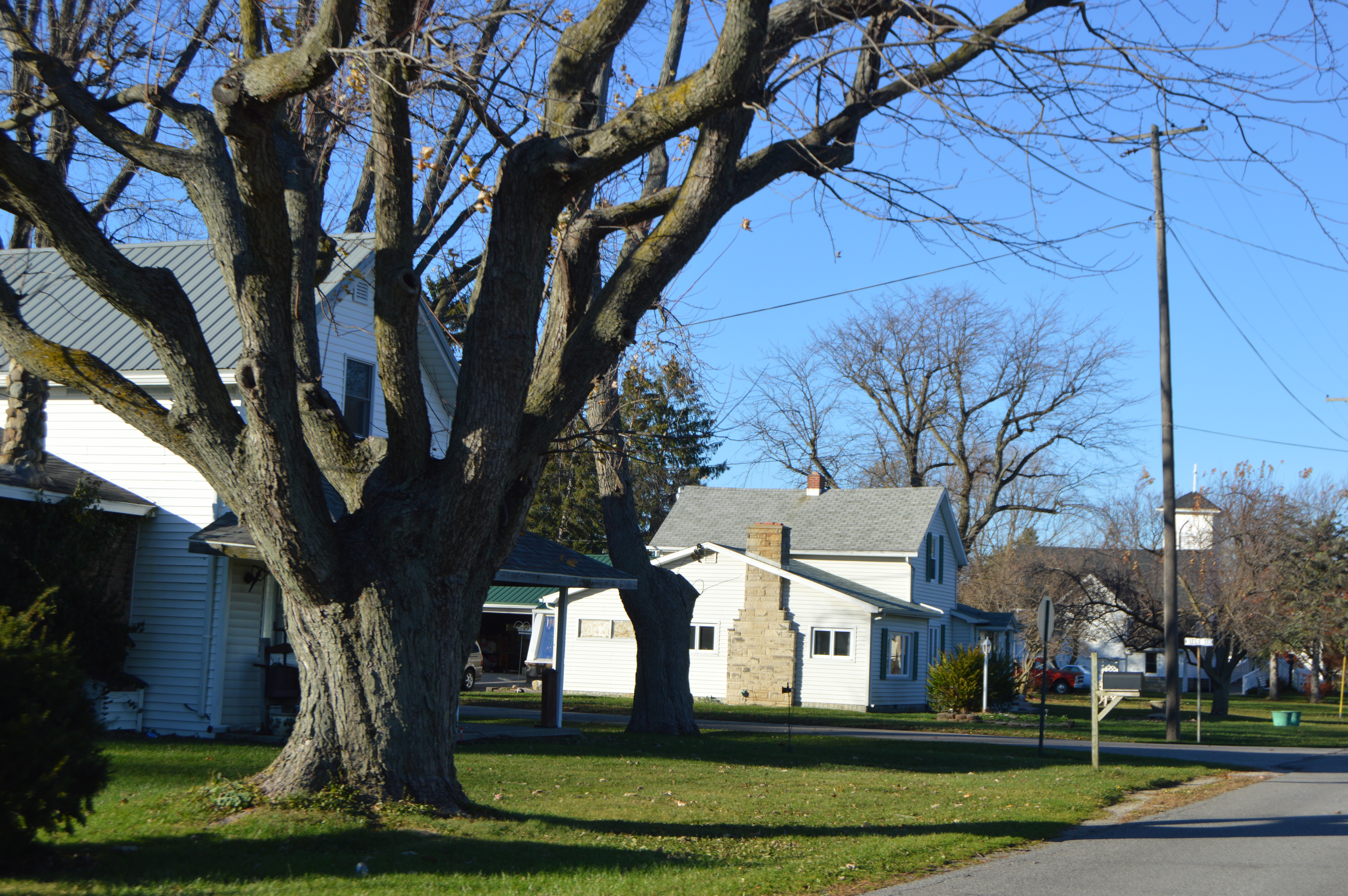
- Main Street in Briceton

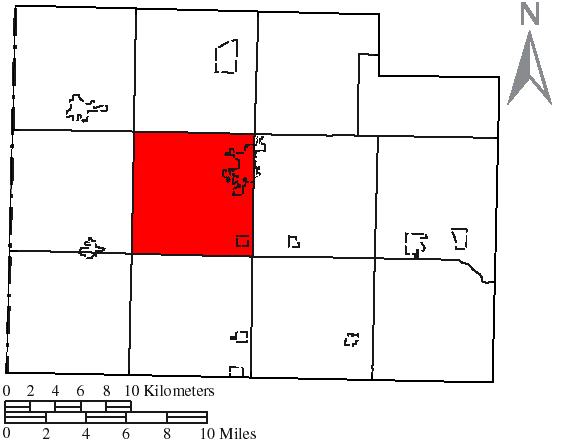
- Location of Paulding Township in Paulding County
- Coordinates: 41°7′46″N 84°35′44″W
- Country: United States
- State: Ohio
- County: Paulding

Area
  - Total: 36.2 sq mi (93.8 km^{2})
  - Land: 36.1 sq mi (93.5 km^{2})
  - Water: 0.12 sq mi (0.3 km^{2})
- Elevation: 720 ft (220 m)

Population (2020)
  - Total: 3,878
  - Density: 107/sq mi (41.5/km^{2})
- Time zone: UTC-5 (Eastern (EST))
  - Summer (DST): UTC-4 (EDT)
- ZIP code: 45879
- Area code: 419
- FIPS code: 39-61266
- GNIS feature ID: 1086776

Paulding Township is one of the twelve townships of Paulding County, Ohio, United States. The 2020 census found 3,878 people in the township.

== Geography ==
Located in the central part of the county, it borders the following townships:

- Crane Township - north
- Emerald Township - northeast corner
- Jackson Township - east
- Latty Township - southeast corner
- Blue Creek Township - south
- Benton Township - southwest corner
- Harrison Township - west
- Carryall Township - northwest corner

Two villages are located in Paulding Township: most of Paulding, the county seat and largest village of Paulding County, in the northeast; and Latty in the southeast.

It is one of two county townships (the other being Jackson Township) without a border on any other county.

== Name and history ==
It is the only Paulding Township statewide.

== Government ==
The township is governed by a three-member board of trustees, who are elected in November of odd-numbered years to a four-year term beginning on the following January 1. Two are elected in the year after the presidential election and one is elected in the year before it. There is also an elected township fiscal officer, who serves a four-year term beginning on April 1 of the year after the election, which is held in November of the year before the presidential election. Vacancies in the fiscal officership or on the board of trustees are filled by the remaining trustees.
