= Scott, Ohio =

- Village
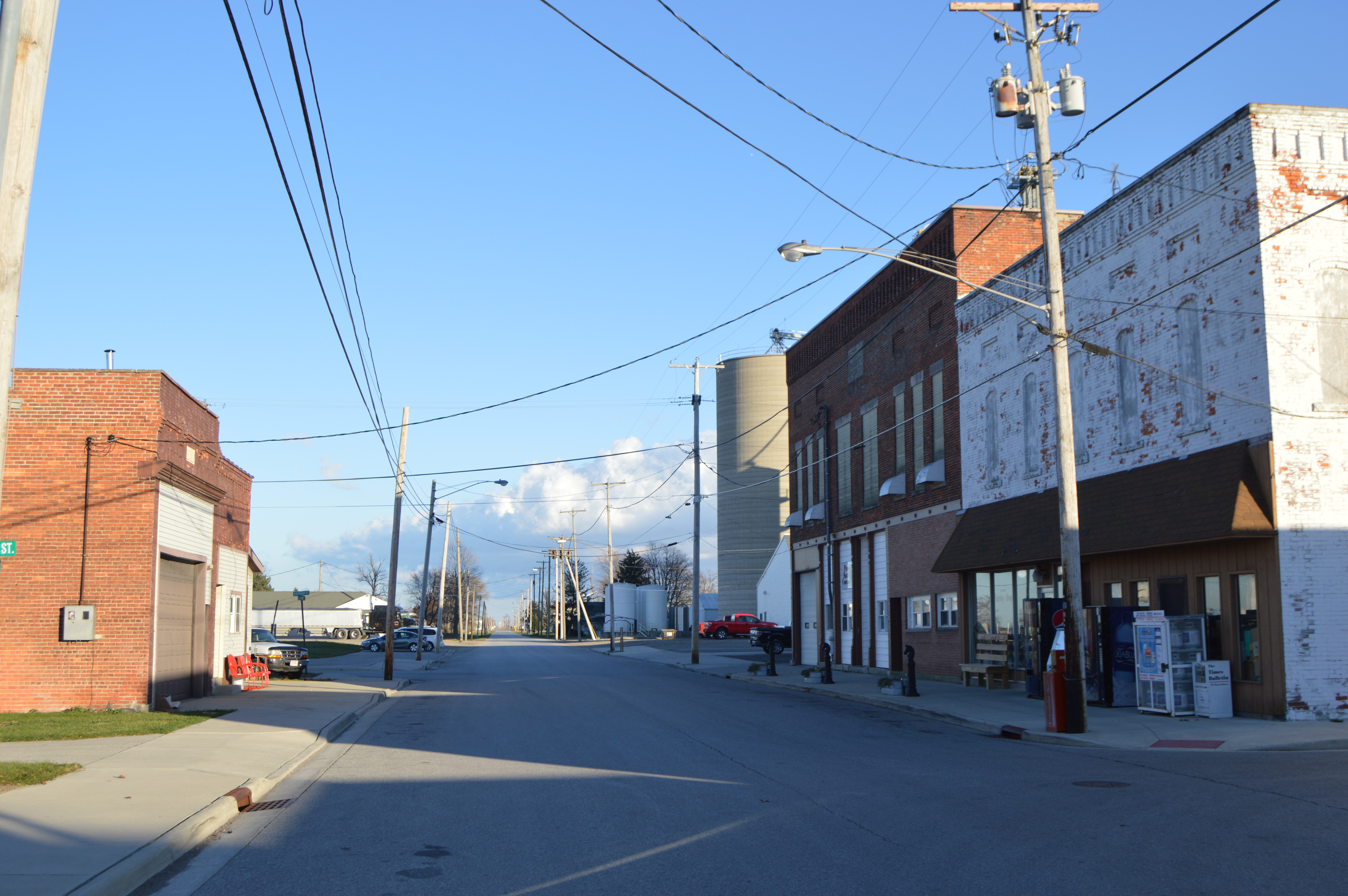
- Blaine Street, downtown. Paulding County is to the left, and Van Wert County to the right.

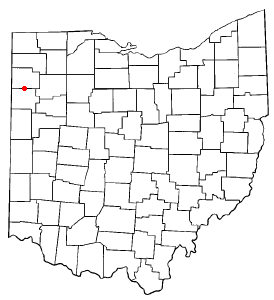
- Location of Scott, Ohio

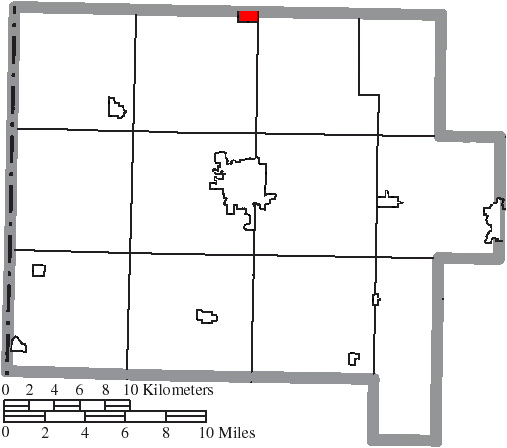
- Location of Scott in Van Wert County
- Coordinates: 40°59′20″N 84°35′01″W
- Country: United States
- State: Ohio
- Counties: Van Wert, Paulding

Government
  - Mayor: Jeremy Akom

Area
  - Total: 0.81 sq mi (2.10 km^{2})
  - Land: 0.81 sq mi (2.10 km^{2})
  - Water: 0 sq mi (0.00 km^{2})
- Elevation: 738 ft (225 m)

Population (2020)
  - Total: 242
  - Density: 298.5/sq mi (115.24/km^{2})
- Time zone: UTC-5 (Eastern (EST))
  - Summer (DST): UTC-4 (EDT)
- ZIP code: 45886
- Area code: 419
- FIPS code: 39-71080
- GNIS feature ID: 2399776

Scott is a village in Paulding and Van Wert counties in the U.S. state of Ohio. The population was 242 at the 2020 census. The Van Wert County portion of Scott is part of the Van Wert Micropolitan Statistical Area.

== History ==
Scott was platted in 1882 by J. T. Scott, and named for him. A post office called Scott has been in operation since 1882.

== Geography ==
According to the United States Census Bureau, the village has a total area of 0.81 square miles (2.10 km^{2}), all land.

== Demographics ==
Historical population
Census	Pop.	Note	%±
1890	733		—
1900	547		−25.4%
1910	472		−13.7%
1920	342		−27.5%
1930	353		3.2%
1940	359		1.7%
1950	347		−3.3%
1960	365		5.2%
1970	329		−9.9%
1980	340		3.3%
1990	339		−0.3%
2000	322		−5.0%
2010	286		−11.2%
2020	242		−15.4%
U.S. Decennial Census

=== 2010 census ===
As of the census of 2010, there were 286 people, 111 households, and 76 families living in the village. The population density was 353.1 inhabitants per square mile (136.3/km^{2}). There were 126 housing units at an average density of 155.6 per square mile (60.1/km^{2}). The racial makeup of the village was 98.6% White, 0.7% from other races, and 0.7% from two or more races. Hispanic or Latino of any race were 0.7% of the population.

There were 111 households, of which 38.7% had children under the age of 18 living with them, 55.0% were married couples living together, 7.2% had a female householder with no husband present, 6.3% had a male householder with no wife present, and 31.5% were non-families. 27.9% of all households were made up of individuals, and 14.4% had someone living alone who was 65 years of age or older. The average household size was 2.58 and the average family size was 3.18.

The median age in the village was 34.7 years. 28.3% of residents were under the age of 18; 8.7% were between the ages of 18 and 24; 25.1% were from 25 to 44; 24.7% were from 45 to 64; and 12.9% were 65 years of age or older. The gender makeup of the village was 47.6% male and 52.4% female.

=== 2000 census ===
As of the census of 2000, there were 322 people, 121 households, and 87 families living in the village. The population density was 399.1 inhabitants per square mile (154.1/km^{2}). There were 130 housing units at an average density of 161.1 per square mile (62.2/km^{2}). The racial makeup of the village was 95.96% White, 2.80% African American, 0.31% Native American, 0.93% from other races. Hispanic or Latino of any race were 1.86% of the population.

There were 121 households, out of which 38.0% had children under the age of 18 living with them, 63.6% were married couples living together, 5.8% had a female householder with no husband present, and 27.3% were non-families. 23.1% of all households were made up of individuals, and 9.9% had someone living alone who was 65 years of age or older. The average household size was 2.66 and the average family size was 3.14.

In the village, the population was spread out, with 29.5% under the age of 18, 11.8% from 18 to 24, 26.4% from 25 to 44, 21.1% from 45 to 64, and 11.2% who were 65 years of age or older. The median age was 32 years. For every 100 females there were 100.0 males. For every 100 females age 18 and over, there were 104.5 males.

The median income for a household in the village was $36,667, and the median income for a family was $41,667. Males had a median income of $31,563 versus $21,875 for females. The per capita income for the village was $14,192. About 8.0% of families and 13.3% of the population were below the poverty line, including 22.0% of those under age 18 and 8.8% of those age 65 or over.
