= Latty Township, Paulding County, Ohio =

Township in Ohio, US

- Township
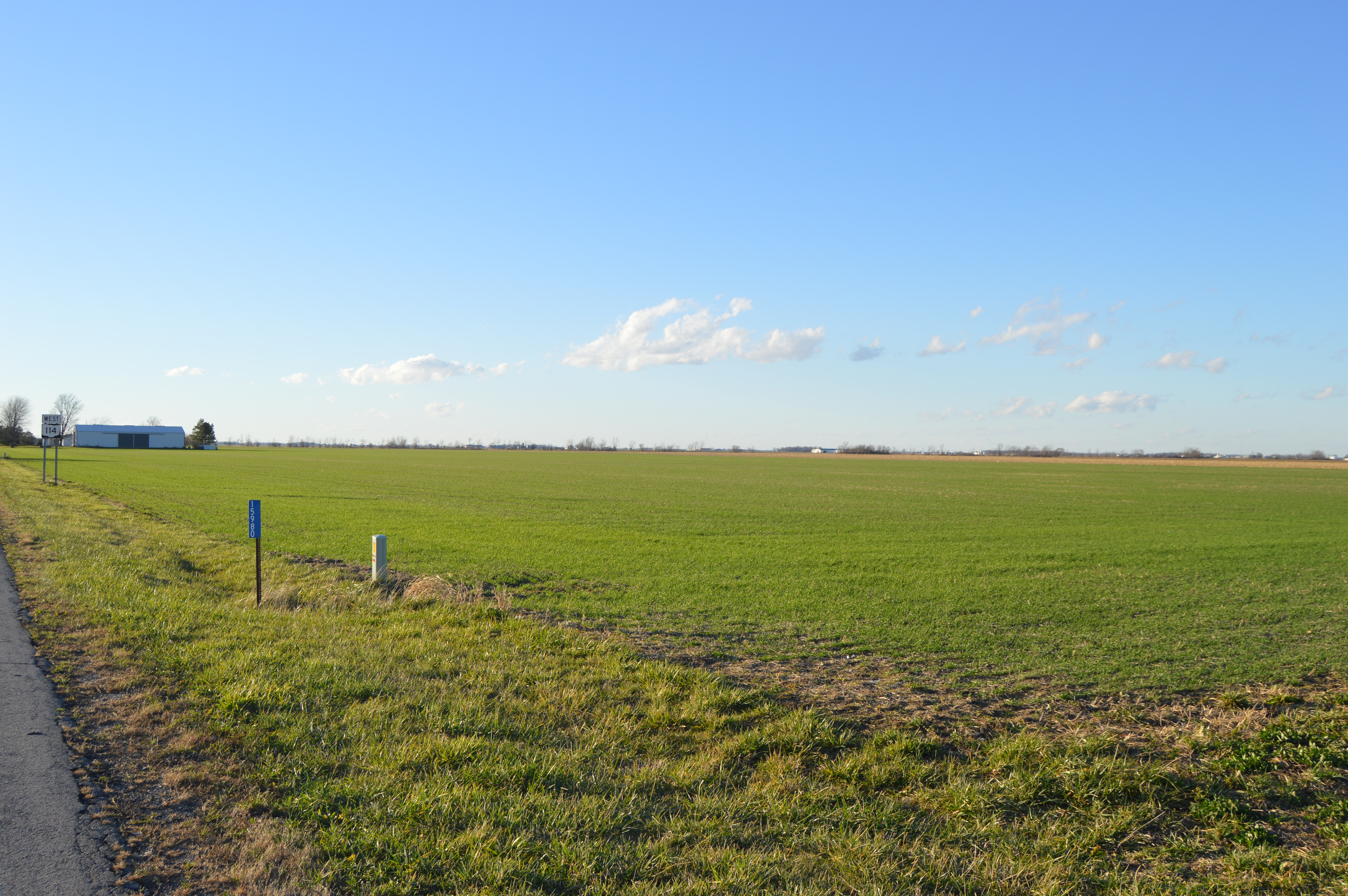
- Farmland between Grover Hill and Haviland

- Flag

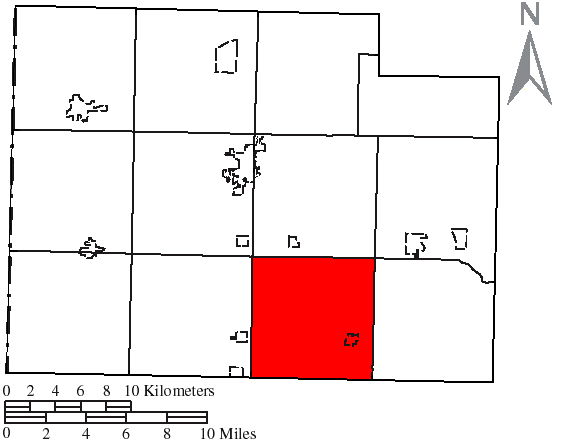
- Location of Latty Township in Paulding County
- Coordinates: 41°1′35″N 84°30′19″W
- Country: United States
- State: Ohio
- County: Paulding

Area
  - Total: 36.4 sq mi (94.3 km^{2})
  - Land: 36.4 sq mi (94.3 km^{2})
  - Water: 0 sq mi (0.0 km^{2})
- Elevation: 725 ft (221 m)

Population (2020)
  - Total: 978
  - Density: 26.9/sq mi (10.4/km^{2})
- Time zone: UTC-5 (Eastern (EST))
  - Summer (DST): UTC-4 (EDT)
- ZIP code: 45855
- Area code: 419
- FIPS code: 39-42000
- GNIS feature ID: 1086775

Latty Township is one of the twelve townships of Paulding County, Ohio, United States. The 2020 census found 978 people in the township.

== Geography ==
Located in the southern part of the county, it borders the following townships:

- Jackson Township - north
- Brown Township - northeast corner
- Washington Township - east
- Jackson Township, Van Wert County - southeast
- Hoaglin Township, Van Wert County - south
- Union Township, Van Wert County - southwest corner
- Blue Creek Township - west
- Paulding Township - northwest corner

The village of Grover Hill is located in southeastern Latty Township.

== Name and history ==
It is the only Latty Township statewide.

== Government ==
The township is governed by a three-member board of trustees, who are elected in November of odd-numbered years to a four-year term beginning on the following January 1. Two are elected in the year after the presidential election and one is elected in the year before it. There is also an elected township fiscal officer, who serves a four-year term beginning on April 1 of the year after the election, which is held in November of the year before the presidential election. Vacancies in the fiscal officership or on the board of trustees are filled by the remaining trustees.
