= Payne, Ohio =

- Village
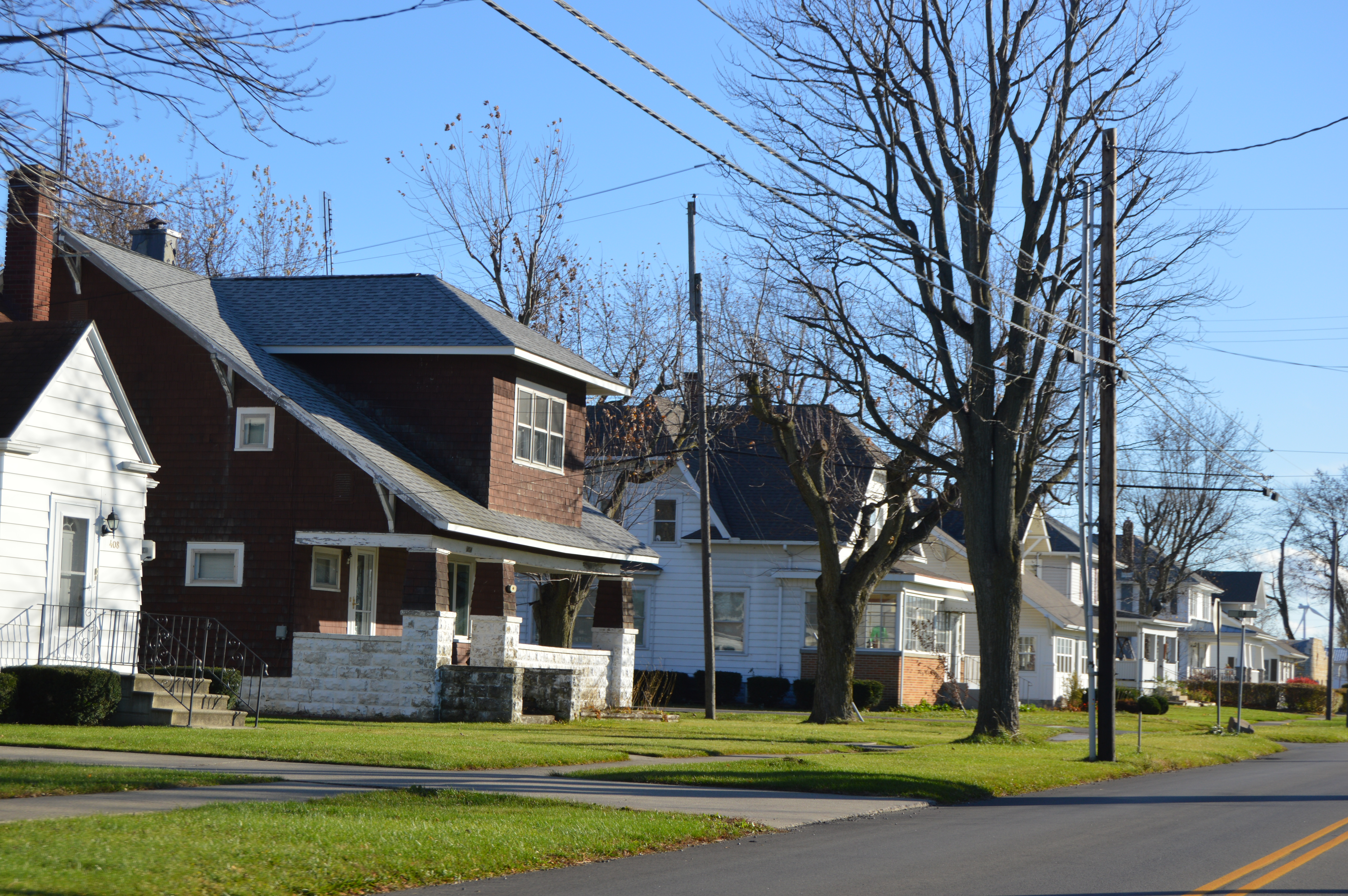
- Main Street

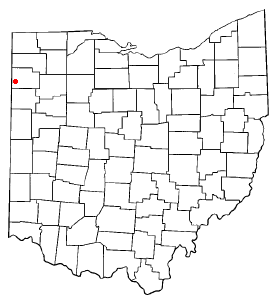
- Location of Payne, Ohio

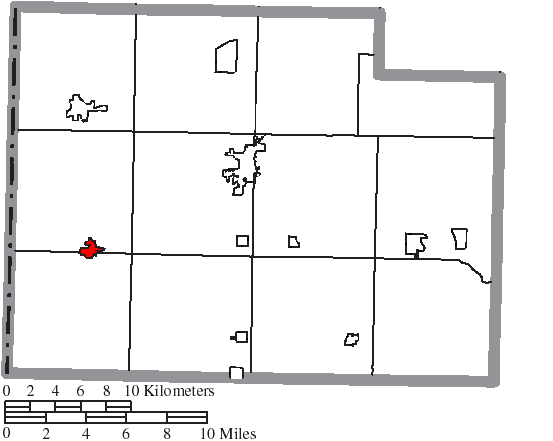
- Location of Payne in Paulding County
- Coordinates: 41°04′47″N 84°43′38″W
- Country: United States
- State: Ohio
- County: Paulding

Government
  - Mayor: Lora Lyons

Area
  - Total: 0.68 sq mi (1.76 km^{2})
  - Land: 0.68 sq mi (1.76 km^{2})
  - Water: 0 sq mi (0.00 km^{2})
- Elevation: 751 ft (229 m)

Population (2020)
  - Total: 1,192
  - Density: 1,756.7/sq mi (678.25/km^{2})
- Time zone: UTC-5 (Eastern (EST))
  - Summer (DST): UTC-4 (EDT)
- ZIP code: 45880
- Area code: 419
- FIPS code: 39-61322
- GNIS feature ID: 2399637

Payne is a village in Paulding County, Ohio, United States. The population was 1,192 at the 2020 census.

== History ==
Payne was originally called Flatrock City, and under the latter name was laid out in 1872. The present name honors Henry B. Payne, an Ohio senator.

== Geography ==
According to the United States Census Bureau, the village has a total area of 0.68 square miles (1.76 km^{2}), all land.

== Demographics ==
Historical population
Census	Pop.	Note	%±
1890	1,146		—
1900	1,336		16.6%
1910	1,207		−9.7%
1920	984		−18.5%
1930	1,614		64.0%
1940	1,003		−37.9%
1950	1,062		5.9%
1960	1,287		21.2%
1970	1,351		5.0%
1980	1,399		3.6%
1990	1,244		−11.1%
2000	1,166		−6.3%
2010	1,194		2.4%
2020	1,192		−0.2%
U.S. Decennial Census

=== 2010 census ===
As of the census of 2010, there were 1,194 people, 497 households, and 320 families living in the village. The population density was 1,755.9 inhabitants per square mile (678.0/km^{2}). There were 554 housing units at an average density of 814.7 per square mile (314.6/km^{2}). The racial makeup of the village was 95.5% White, 0.4% African American, 0.1% Native American, 0.1% Asian, 0.1% Pacific Islander, 2.0% from other races, and 1.8% from two or more races. Hispanic or Latino of any race were 4.0% of the population.

There were 497 households, of which 32.4% had children under the age of 18 living with them, 46.3% were married couples living together, 11.7% had a female householder with no husband present, 6.4% had a male householder with no wife present, and 35.6% were non-families. 32.2% of all households were made up of individuals, and 15.9% had someone living alone who was 65 years of age or older. The average household size was 2.36 and the average family size was 2.91.

The median age in the village was 39.4 years. 25.3% of residents were under the age of 18; 8.2% were between the ages of 18 and 24; 22.6% were from 25 to 44; 24.3% were from 45 to 64; and 19.4% were 65 years of age or older. The gender makeup of the village was 47.2% male and 52.8% female.

=== 2000 census ===
As of the census of 2000, there were 1,166 people, 508 households, and 325 families living in the village. The population density was 2,168.6 inhabitants per square mile (837.3/km^{2}). There were 544 housing units at an average density of 1,011.8 per square mile (390.7/km^{2}). The racial makeup of the village was 97.26% White, 0.43% African American, 0.09% Asian, 1.03% from other races, and 1.20% from two or more races. Hispanic or Latino of any race were 3.34% of the population.

There were 508 households, out of which 28.1% had children under the age of 18 living with them, 47.6% were married couples living together, 11.0% had a female householder with no husband present, and 36.0% were non-families. 32.5% of all households were made up of individuals, and 16.7% had someone living alone who was 65 years of age or older. The average household size was 2.29 and the average family size was 2.85.

In the village, the population was spread out, with 23.7% under the age of 18, 9.9% from 18 to 24, 27.8% from 25 to 44, 20.8% from 45 to 64, and 17.8% who were 65 years of age or older. The median age was 37 years. For every 100 females there were 86.6 males. For every 100 females age 18 and over, there were 84.6 males.

The median income for a household in the village was $36,250, and the median income for a family was $42,024. Males had a median income of $36,912 versus $20,833 for females. The per capita income for the village was $17,908. About 3.2% of families and 5.3% of the population were below the poverty line, including 6.3% of those under age 18 and 8.4% of those age 65 or over.

== Education ==
Payne students attend the Wayne Trace Local School District.

Payne has a public library, a branch of the Paulding County Library.
