= Latty, Ohio =

- Village
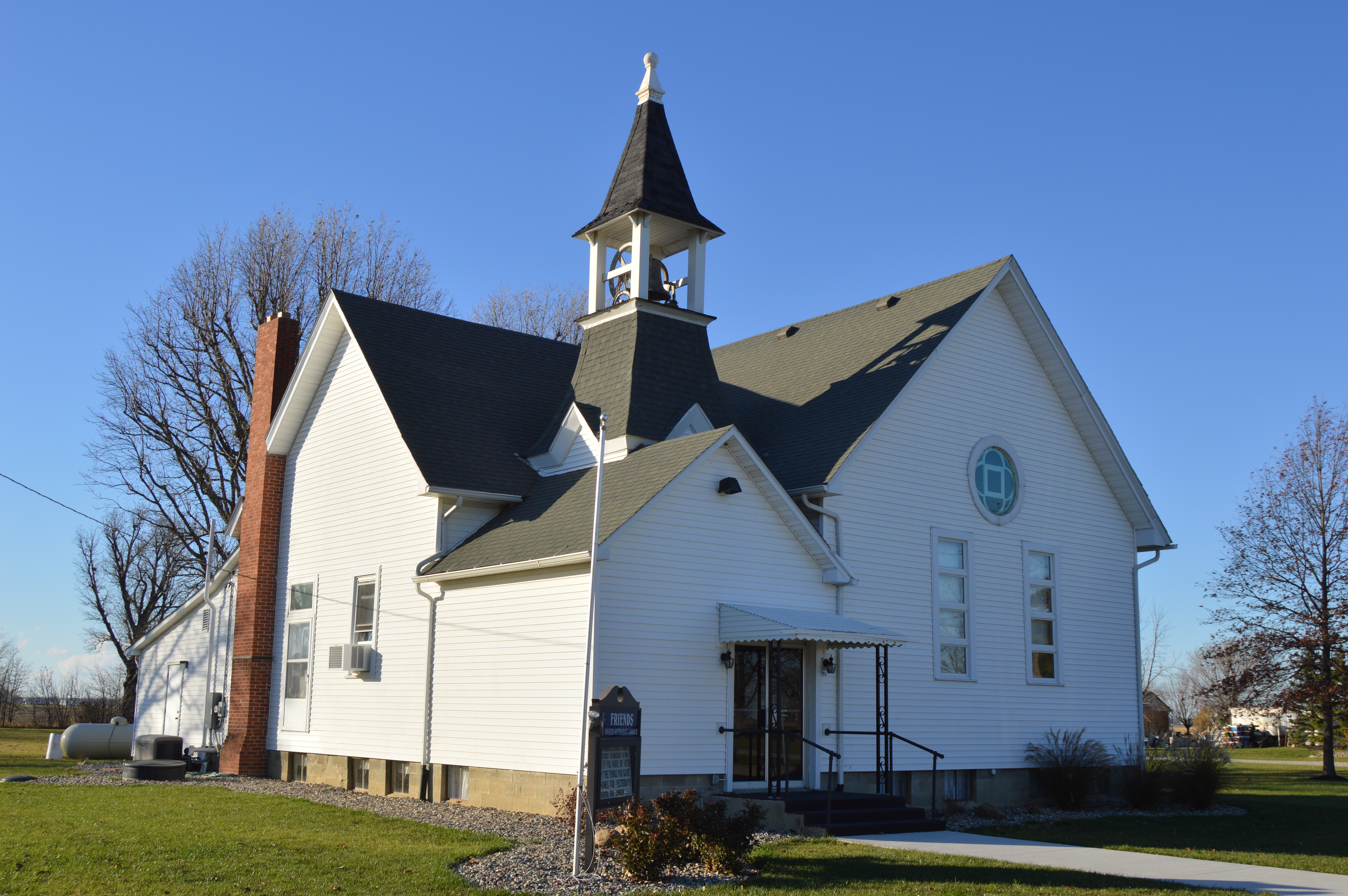
- Friends United Methodist Church on Lewis Street

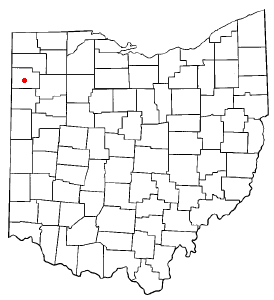
- Location of Latty, Ohio

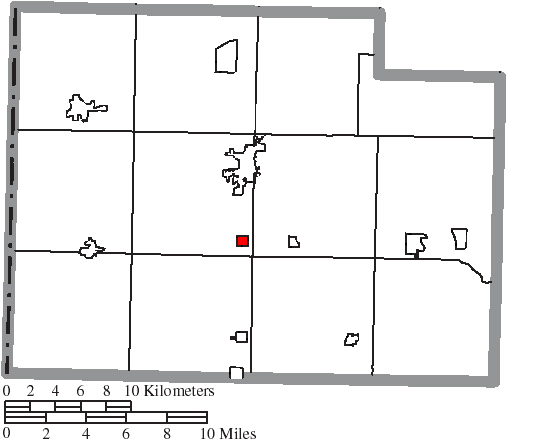
- Location of Latty in Paulding County
- Coordinates: 41°05′16″N 84°34′59″W
- Country: United States
- State: Ohio
- County: Paulding
- Township: Paulding

Area
  - Total: 0.27 sq mi (0.70 km^{2})
  - Land: 0.27 sq mi (0.70 km^{2})
  - Water: 0 sq mi (0.00 km^{2})
- Elevation: 728 ft (222 m)

Population (2020)
  - Total: 165
  - Density: 614.0/sq mi (237.08/km^{2})
- Time zone: UTC-5 (Eastern (EST))
  - Summer (DST): UTC-4 (EDT)
- ZIP code: 45855
- Area code: 419
- FIPS code: 39-41986
- GNIS feature ID: 2398397

Latty is a village in Paulding County, Ohio, United States. The population was 165 at the 2020 census.

== History ==
A post office called Latty has been in operation since 1882. The village was named for Judge A. S. Latty, an early settler.

== Geography ==
According to the United States Census Bureau, the village has a total area of 0.27 square miles (0.70 km^{2}), all land.

== Demographics ==
Historical population
Census	Pop.	Note	%±
1890	594		—
1900	444		−25.3%
1910	339		−23.6%
1920	294		−13.3%
1930	274		−6.8%
1940	293		6.9%
1950	272		−7.2%
1960	286		5.1%
1970	269		−5.9%
1980	261		−3.0%
1990	205		−21.5%
2000	200		−2.4%
2010	193		−3.5%
2020	165		−14.5%
U.S. Decennial Census

=== 2010 census ===
As of the census of 2010, there were 193 people, 70 households, and 55 families living in the village. The population density was 714.8 inhabitants per square mile (276.0/km^{2}). There were 80 housing units at an average density of 296.3 per square mile (114.4/km^{2}). The racial makeup of the village was 88.6% White, 5.2% African American, 3.1% Native American, and 3.1% from two or more races. Hispanic or Latino of any race were 3.6% of the population.

There were 70 households, of which 35.7% had children under the age of 18 living with them, 54.3% were married couples living together, 17.1% had a female householder with no husband present, 7.1% had a male householder with no wife present, and 21.4% were non-families. 21.4% of all households were made up of individuals, and 7.2% had someone living alone who was 65 years of age or older. The average household size was 2.76 and the average family size was 3.09.

The median age in the village was 37.3 years. 28.5% of residents were under the age of 18; 9.4% were between the ages of 18 and 24; 21.2% were from 25 to 44; 31% were from 45 to 64; and 9.8% were 65 years of age or older. The gender makeup of the village was 50.3% male and 49.7% female.

=== 2000 census ===
As of the census of 2000, there were 200 people, 77 households, and 56 families living in the village. The population density was 748.2 people per square mile (286.0/km^{2}). There were 82 housing units at an average density of 306.8 per square mile (118.5/km^{2}). The racial makeup of the village was 82.50% White, 9.50% African American, 2.00% Native American, 0.50% Asian, 1.50% from other races, and 4.00% from two or more races. Hispanic or Latino of any race were 4.00% of the population.

There were 77 households, out of which 40.3% had children under the age of 18 living with them, 59.7% were married couples living together, 6.5% had a female householder with no husband present, and 26.0% were non-families. 22.1% of all households were made up of individuals, and 13.0% had someone living alone who was 65 years of age or older. The average household size was 2.60 and the average family size was 3.09.

In the village, the population was spread out, with 31.5% under the age of 18, 5.0% from 18 to 24, 28.0% from 25 to 44, 20.5% from 45 to 64, and 15.0% who were 65 years of age or older. The median age was 380 years. For every 100 females there were 100.0 males. For every 100 females age0 18 and over, there were 90.30 males.

The median income for a household in the village was $38,125, and the median income for a family was $46,667. Males had a median income of $38,214 versus $21,250 for females. The per capita income for the village was $17,801. About 8.3% of families and 12.6% of the population were below the poverty line, including 5.4% of those under the age of eighteen and 23.9% of those 65 or over.

== Notable person ==
- Ralph L. Ropp, the president of Louisiana Tech University in Ruston, Louisiana, from 1949 to 1962, graduated from Latty High School in 1913.
