= Paulding County, Ohio =

County in Ohio, United States

- County
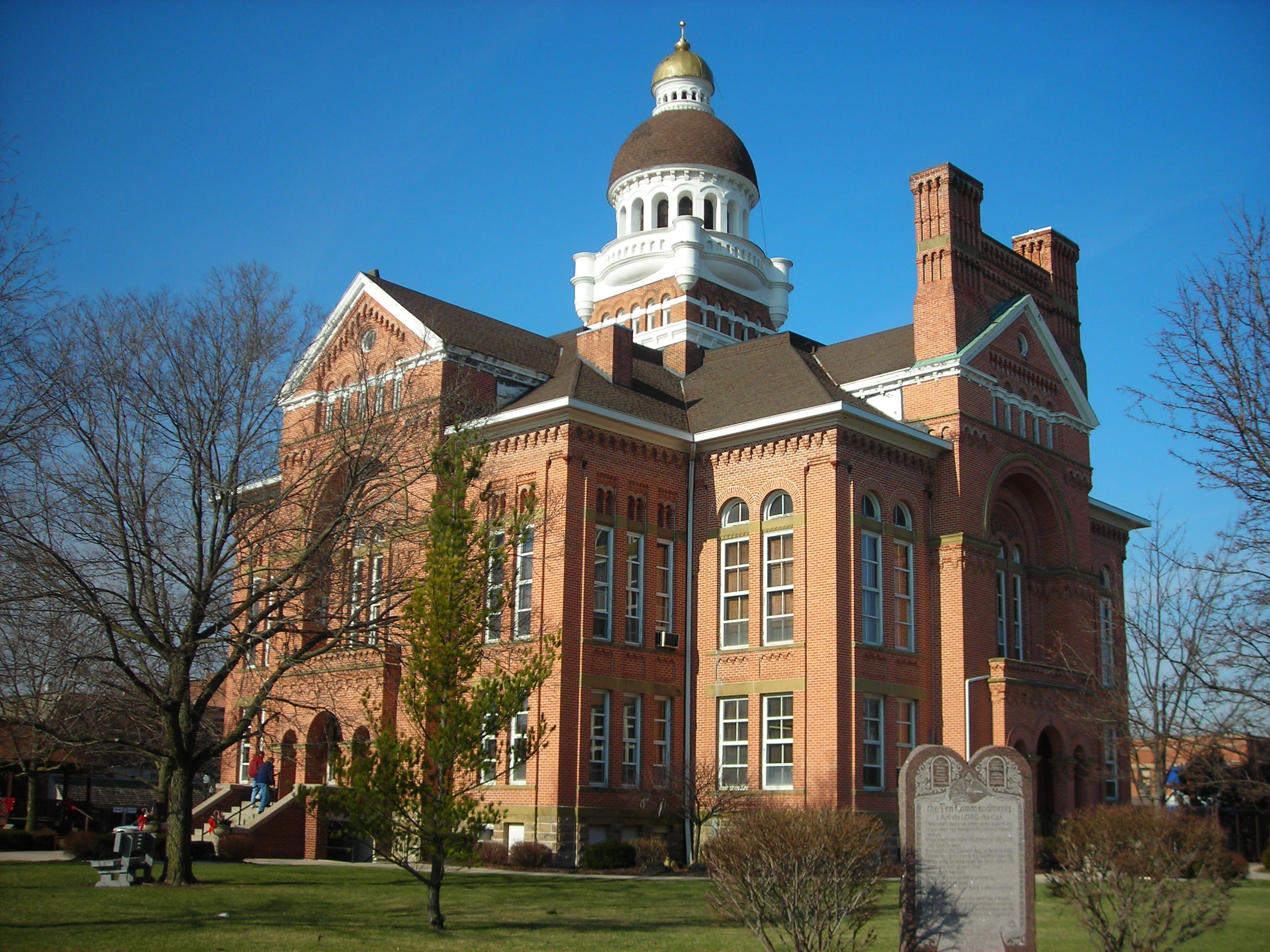
- Courthouse in village of Paulding

- Flag Seal
- Motto: No Compromise
- Location within the U.S. state of Ohio
- Coordinates: 41°07′N 84°35′W
- Country: United States
- State: Ohio
- Founded: March 18, 1839
- Named for: John Paulding
- Seat: Paulding
- Largest village: Paulding

Area
  - Total: 419 sq mi (1,090 km^{2})
  - Land: 416 sq mi (1,080 km^{2})
  - Water: 2.4 sq mi (6.2 km^{2}) 0.6%

Population (2020)
  - Total: 18,806
  - Estimate (2025): 18,727 ▼
  - Density: 45/sq mi (17/km^{2})
- Time zone: UTC−5 (Eastern)
  - Summer (DST): UTC−4 (EDT)
- Congressional district: 5th
- Website: www.pauldingcountyoh.com

Paulding County is a county located in the U.S. state of Ohio. As of the 2020 census, the population was 18,806. Its county seat is Paulding. The county was created in 1820 and later organized in 1839. It is named for John Paulding, one of the captors of Major John André in the American Revolutionary War.

== History ==
The Ottawa tribe of Native Americans were the prevalent occupants of the region before Europeans arrived in North America following the 1492 expedition of Christopher Columbus. By 1750, however, there were Miamis, Prankaahaws, Delawares, Shawnee, Kickapoos, Muscounteres, Huron, Weas, Wyandotts and Mohawks.

Under the Northwest Ordinance of 1787, the Continental Congress opened what is now Ohio, Indiana, Illinois, Michigan, and Wisconsin to settlement. However, the Treaty of Paris that ended the American Revolution in 1783 allowed the British to remain in the Northwest Territory until matters were resolved with the Indians. General Washington sent General "Mad" Anthony Wayne to subdue the native population. He built a series of forts, including Fort Brown, located between Charloe and Melrose. In order to defend against Indian ambush, he cut a swath of woods a mile wide, known as the Wayne Trace. His campaign culminated in a decisive 1794 victory by the Legion of the United States against Indians led by Chief Little Turtle of the nearby Maumee, Ohio in the Battle of Fallen Timbers, and signing of the Treaty of Greenville in 1795.

Paulding County was originally part of territory set aside for Ohio's Indian people by the Treaty of Greenville, though that did not last long. Paulding County was organized by the legislature on April 1, 1820, from lands that were formerly part of Williams County. At that point, it consisted of 12 perfectly square townships. In 1845, Defiance County was formed from lands that were part of Williams County, plus the northern half of Auglaize Township. It was at this time that four sections of Emerald Township were transferred to Auglaize Township.

Settlement of Paulding County was slow, due to the difficult living conditions. Farmers complained that they grew two crops a year - frogs and ice. Many residents suffered from the ague, a disease later determined to be malaria. The primary industries were based on the thick forests. Many timbers were floated up the Maumee River to be used as ship's masts. The trees were so large that one man lived in a hollow tree. There were also many who earned money through the winter by crafting barrel staves with an adze.

George Washington had promoted the construction of canals to provide interior transportation for the fledgling nation. Once the Erie Canal was opened in 1825, entrepreneurs promoted other canals, including the Miami and Erie Canal and the Wabash and Erie Canal. The Miami and Erie ran from Lake Erie to the Little Miami River near Cincinnati, through Paulding County, and the Wabash and Erie Canal went west into Indiana, meeting the Miami and Erie in Junction, a community in Auglaize township. The canal excitement was so great that people were leaving Fort Wayne, Indiana for Junction, feeling that it had a much brighter future. Canal workers choosing Paulding County as their tax home built the county's population to 25,000 people in 1835, a number it has never approached since.

The combined canal system was the largest canal system in the world, but was profitable for only a short period. The canal was useless in winter, and the banks were constantly caving in, requiring constant dredging to remain passable. To protect the banks, canal boats had to operate at extremely slow speed. The canal system started being abandoned even before it was completely built. The coming of the railroad quickly supplanted the canals as the primary means of long-haul travel.

A relic of this era is the Furnace Farm near Cecil. Ore was brought in by canal, where it was turned into iron using the ample local fuel. One furnace remains, where it was allowed to cool without being emptied, there being no point in pouring iron that could not be shipped economically to market.

Built in the 1910s, the Paulding County Carnegie Library was the first Carnegie library to serve an entire county instead of a single city. In addition to the library, Andrew Carnegie matched local funds to install a pipe organ in what is now known as Paulding United Methodist Church.

In the early 20th century, Paulding had the highest unsolved murder rate of any county in the USA. The Purple Gang was thought to be exporting the corpses of their victims to the rural countryside, where they could be dumped without being seen. The sheriff argued that they were not local people, not murdered locally, and it was not worth spending large sums of tax dollars on what was essentially a littering problem.

== Geography ==
According to the U.S. Census Bureau, the county has a total area of 419 square miles (1,090 km^{2}), of which 416 square miles (1,080 km^{2}) is land and 2.4 square miles (6.2 km^{2}) (0.6%) is water.

The center of the county is 723 feet above sea level, and the rest of the county does not vary much from that. The land is the most level of any county in the state, and plats look like a checkerboard, with roads every mile. This level terrain resulted in Paulding County being entirely within the Great Black Swamp, unlike any other.

The county contains U.S. Routes 127, 24, and 30 (the Lincoln Highway). There are two major rivers, the Auglaize and the Maumee, as well as numerous small creeks. The largest bodies of water are manmade ponds.

=== Adjacent counties ===
- Defiance County (north)
- Putnam County (east)
- Van Wert County (south)
- Allen County, Indiana (west)

== Demographics ==
Historical population
Census	Pop.	Note	%±
1830	161		—
1840	1,034		542.2%
1850	1,766		70.8%
1860	4,945		180.0%
1870	8,544		72.8%
1880	13,485		57.8%
1890	25,932		92.3%
1900	27,528		6.2%
1910	22,730		−17.4%
1920	18,736		−17.6%
1930	15,301		−18.3%
1940	15,527		1.5%
1950	15,047		−3.1%
1960	16,792		11.6%
1970	19,329		15.1%
1980	21,302		10.2%
1990	20,488		−3.8%
2000	20,293		−1.0%
2010	19,614		−3.3%
2020	18,806		−4.1%
2025 (est.)	18,727	▼	−0.4%
U.S. Decennial Census; 1790–1960 1900–1990; 1990–2000 2020

=== 2020 census ===
As of the 2020 census, the county had a population of 18,806. The median age was 41.3 years. 24.1% of residents were under the age of 18 and 19.5% of residents were 65 years of age or older. For every 100 females there were 97.7 males, and for every 100 females age 18 and over there were 97.4 males age 18 and over.

The racial makeup of the county was 91.8% White, 0.8% Black or African American, 0.5% American Indian and Alaska Native, 0.2% Asian, <0.1% Native Hawaiian and Pacific Islander, 2.0% from some other race, and 4.8% from two or more races. Hispanic or Latino residents of any race comprised 5.4% of the population.

<0.1% of residents lived in urban areas, while 100.0% lived in rural areas.

There were 7,590 households in the county, of which 29.8% had children under the age of 18 living in them. Of all households, 51.9% were married-couple households, 18.6% were households with a male householder and no spouse or partner present, and 22.7% were households with a female householder and no spouse or partner present. About 27.7% of all households were made up of individuals and 13.3% had someone living alone who was 65 years of age or older.

There were 8,490 housing units, of which 10.6% were vacant. Among occupied housing units, 77.8% were owner-occupied and 22.2% were renter-occupied. The homeowner vacancy rate was 1.5% and the rental vacancy rate was 8.4%.

=== Racial and ethnic composition ===
Paulding County, Ohio – Racial and ethnic composition Note: the US Census treats Hispanic/Latino as an ethnic category. This table excludes Latinos from the racial categories and assigns them to a separate category. Hispanics/Latinos may be of any race.
Race / ethnicity (NH = Non-Hispanic)	Pop 1980	Pop 1990	Pop 2000	Pop 2010	Pop 2020	% 1980	% 1990	% 2000	% 2010	% 2020
White alone (NH)	20,494	19,580	19,227	18,348	16,972	96.21%	95.57%	94.75%	93.55%	90.25%
Black or African American alone (NH)	238	210	188	158	139	1.12%	1.02%	0.93%	0.81%	0.74%
Native American or Alaska Native alone (NH)	21	43	53	51	41	0.10%	0.21%	0.26%	0.26%	0.22%
Asian alone (NH)	16	17	31	38	30	0.08%	0.08%	0.15%	0.19%	0.16%
Native Hawaiian or Pacific Islander alone (NH)	x	x	3	2	5	x	x	0.01%	0.01%	0.03%
Other race alone (NH)	26	10	4	5	61	0.12%	0.05%	0.02%	0.03%	0.32%
Mixed race or Multiracial (NH)	x	x	175	174	548	x	x	0.86%	0.89%	2.91%
Hispanic or Latino (any race)	507	628	612	838	1,010	2.38%	3.07%	3.02%	4.27%	5.37%
Total	21,302	20,488	20,293	19,614	18,806	100.00%	100.00%	100.00%	100.00%	100.00%

=== 2010 census ===
As of the 2010 United States census, there were 19,614 people, 7,769 households, and 5,467 families living in the county. The population density was 47.1 inhabitants per square mile (18.2/km^{2}). There were 8,749 housing units at an average density of 21.0 units per square mile (8.1 units/km^{2}). The racial makeup of the county was 95.7% white, 0.9% black or African American, 0.3% American Indian, 0.2% Asian, 1.3% from other races, and 1.6% from two or more races. Those of Hispanic or Latino origin made up 4.3% of the population. In terms of ancestry, 40.1% were German, 10.5% were Irish, 10.4% were English, and 10.4% were American.

Of the 7,769 households, 32.5% had children under the age of 18 living with them, 56.1% were married couples living together, 9.2% had a female householder with no husband present, 29.6% were non-families, and 25.0% of all households were made up of individuals. The average household size was 2.51 and the average family size was 2.99. The median age was 40.0 years.

The median income for a household in the county was $46,459 and the median income for a family was $56,170. Males had a median income of $38,656 versus $27,182 for females. The per capita income for the county was $20,919. About 8.6% of families and 11.0% of the population were below the poverty line, including 17.6% of those under age 18 and 8.9% of those age 65 or over.

=== 2000 census ===
As of the census of 2000, there were 20,293 people, 7,773 households, and 5,689 families living in the county. The population density was 49 people per square mile (19 people/km^{2}). There were 8,478 housing units at an average density of 20 units per square mile (7.7/km^{2}). The racial makeup of the county was 95.85% White, 0.96% Black or African American, 0.29% Native American, 0.15% Asian, 0.01% Pacific Islander, 1.41% from other races, and 1.33% from two or more races. 3.02% of the population were Hispanic or Latino.

There were 7,773 households, out of which 34.10% had children under the age of 18 living with them, 60.90% were married couples living together, 8.10% had a female householder with no husband present, and 26.80% were non-families. 23.00% of all households were made up of individuals, and 10.30% had someone living alone who was 65 years of age or older. The average household size was 2.59 and the average family size was 3.06.

In the county, the population was spread out, with 26.80% under the age of 18, 8.60% from 18 to 24, 28.00% from 25 to 44, 24.00% from 45 to 64, and 12.60% who were 65 years of age or older. The median age was 36 years. For every 100 females there were 96.70 males. For every 100 females age 18 and over, there were 95.40 males.

The median income for a household in the county was $40,327, and the median income for a family was $45,481. Males had a median income of $35,809 versus $21,965 for females. The per capita income for the county was $18,062. About 4.90% of families and 7.70% of the population were below the poverty line, including 9.50% of those under age 18 and 7.10% of those age 65 or over.

== Politics ==
Paulding County is a Republican stronghold county in presidential elections. Lyndon B. Johnson in 1964 was the last Democratic candidate to win the county. In the 1980 Senate election, while Democrat John Glenn won the state by 40 points, Paulding County was the only county he lost, by 5.5 points, after winning it by 24 points in his previous election where he carried all counties. However, the county would back Glenn again in his last two elections in 1986 and 1992.

United States presidential election results for Paulding County, Ohio
Year	Republican		Democratic		Third party(ies)	
Year	No.	%	No.	%	No.	%
1856	497	73.96%	170	25.30%	5	0.74%
1860	554	58.07%	391	40.99%	9	0.94%
1864	805	69.10%	360	30.90%	0	0.00%
1868	834	57.24%	623	42.76%	0	0.00%
1872	979	60.32%	637	39.25%	7	0.43%
1876	1,313	52.67%	1,180	47.33%	0	0.00%
1880	1,527	51.54%	1,431	48.30%	5	0.17%
1884	2,182	50.95%	2,082	48.61%	19	0.44%
1888	2,975	50.51%	2,781	47.22%	134	2.28%
1892	2,900	47.53%	2,997	49.12%	204	3.34%
1896	3,580	49.30%	3,656	50.34%	26	0.36%
1900	3,597	51.64%	3,284	47.14%	85	1.22%
1904	3,496	56.83%	2,505	40.72%	151	2.45%
1908	3,049	51.62%	2,767	46.84%	91	1.54%
1912	1,542	29.27%	2,296	43.58%	1,431	27.16%
1916	2,647	52.23%	2,313	45.64%	108	2.13%
1920	4,549	61.76%	2,739	37.18%	78	1.06%
1924	3,648	57.79%	2,242	35.52%	422	6.69%
1928	4,093	61.79%	2,473	37.33%	58	0.88%
1932	3,201	42.77%	4,165	55.64%	119	1.59%
1936	3,853	46.70%	4,179	50.65%	219	2.65%
1940	4,949	61.07%	3,155	38.93%	0	0.00%
1944	4,515	65.72%	2,355	34.28%	0	0.00%
1948	3,579	58.58%	2,512	41.11%	19	0.31%
1952	4,837	66.97%	2,386	33.03%	0	0.00%
1956	4,885	69.24%	2,170	30.76%	0	0.00%
1960	4,961	63.72%	2,825	36.28%	0	0.00%
1964	3,254	42.16%	4,465	57.84%	0	0.00%
1968	4,074	53.01%	2,703	35.17%	908	11.82%
1972	4,553	64.81%	2,283	32.50%	189	2.69%
1976	3,593	51.42%	3,229	46.21%	165	2.36%
1980	4,971	58.52%	2,778	32.71%	745	8.77%
1984	5,545	65.71%	2,811	33.31%	83	0.98%
1988	5,381	62.78%	3,114	36.33%	76	0.89%
1992	3,652	38.40%	3,293	34.63%	2,565	26.97%
1996	3,760	43.74%	3,449	40.12%	1,387	16.14%
2000	5,210	58.24%	3,384	37.83%	352	3.93%
2004	6,206	62.82%	3,610	36.54%	63	0.64%
2008	5,317	54.34%	4,165	42.57%	303	3.10%
2012	5,354	58.51%	3,538	38.67%	258	2.82%
2016	6,500	71.47%	2,093	23.01%	502	5.52%
2020	7,086	74.72%	2,213	23.33%	185	1.95%
2024	7,203	77.22%	1,987	21.30%	138	1.48%

United States Senate election results for Paulding County, Ohio1
Year	Republican		Democratic		Third party(ies)	
Year	No.	%	No.	%	No.	%
2024	6,678	72.67%	2,056	22.37%	456	4.96%

== Education ==
In 1971, the Ohio Board of Education revoked the charters of Payne, Blue Creek, Grover Hill and Auglaize-Brown school districts. Blue Creek was itself the merger of Latty and Haviland schools only a few years prior. Payne, Blue Creek, and Grover Hill merged to form the Wayne Trace school district, and Auglaize-Brown joined Paulding Exempted Village Schools.

- Antwerp Local School District
- Paulding Exempted Village School District
- Wayne Trace Local School District
- Vantage Career Center

In the late 1950s, Paulding Exempted Village Schools enacted a pay-as-you-go tax for school construction, designed to reduce overall taxes by paying cash for school construction rather than paying high interest rates on bonds. The pay-as-you-go concept has been adopted in a number of local government units in Ohio.

With students from kindergarten to high school at one location, the Paulding campus of PEVS is one of the largest schools in the state.

== Communities ==
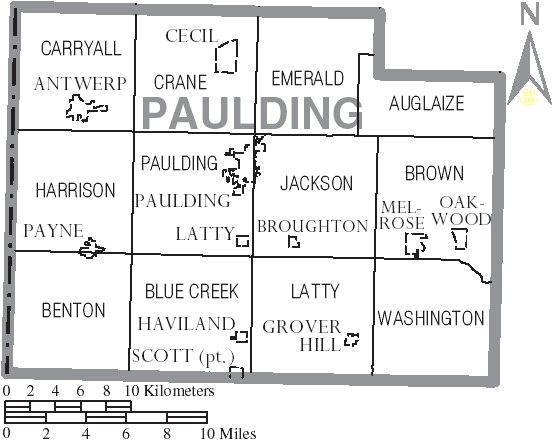
Map of Paulding County, Ohio with municipal and township labels

=== Villages ===
- Antwerp
- Broughton
- Cecil
- Grover Hill
- Haviland
- Latty
- Melrose
- Oakwood
- Paulding (county seat)
- Payne
- Scott

=== Townships ===
- Auglaize
- Benton
- Blue Creek
- Brown
- Carryall
- Crane
- Emerald
- Harrison
- Jackson
- Latty
- Paulding
- Washington

=== Unincorporated communities ===
- Junction
- Mandale
- Roselms

== Interesting facts ==
The Paulding County motto of "No Compromise" came from a banner carried by participants in the Reservoir War.

Paulding County was the first county in the US to receive funding from steel magnate Andrew Carnegie to build a library. Carnegie also matched funds to purchase the pipe organ in the Paulding Methodist Church.

Judge Calvin L. Noble of Paulding County spent the better part of his life as a Paulding County resident. His claim to fame is that he changed the name of the city of Cleaveland, Ohio to Cleveland. Earlier in life, as a printer, he founded the Cleaveland Advertiser. As the name was slightly too long to fit atop the page, he omitted the one letter.

Paulding County was the last county in the United States with no providers offering coverage through the Patient Protection and Affordable Care Act policies on the government's health insurance exchange. In August 2017, CareSources announced plans to sell healthcare through the exchange.

== See also ==
- National Register of Historic Places listings in Paulding County, Ohio
