= Ohio State Route 1 (1961–1965) =

State highway in Ohio, United States

State Route 1
- Original SR 1 highlighted in red; subsequent changes in green and blue

Route information
- Maintained by ODOT
- Length: 353 mi (568 km)
- Existed: 1961–1965

Major junctions
- South end: Cincinnati
- I-75 in Cincinnati; US 25; I-70; US 40; I-71 in Columbus; US 21; I-80S; I-77; Ohio Turnpike; I-80; I-90 in Cleveland; I-271 / I-290
- North end: Pennsylvania state line

Location
- Country: United States
- State: Ohio

Highway system
- Ohio State Highway System; Interstate; US; State; Scenic
← SR 872	→ SR 2

State Route 1 (SR 1) is a former state highway in Ohio originally planned as a second Ohio Turnpike. Its southern terminus was in Cincinnati, and its northern terminus was in Conneaut at the Pennsylvania state line. The majority of its route is now Interstate 71.

== History ==
After the original SR 1 was redesignated as US 40 in 1927, SR 1 was not used for an Ohio highway again until 1961. After planning had been completed for the Ohio Turnpike and construction of the Turnpike was substantially underway, Ohio highway authorities began planning a second Ohio Turnpike extending southwest to northeast across the state. It was planned to run from Cincinnati to Conneaut and connect with an extension built across the panhandle of Pennsylvania to the New York State Thruway. As the highway was being planned, the Federal Aid Highway Act of 1956 was enacted, and the project was converted from a toll road to a free Interstate Highway. It was designated as SR 1, since the Interstate Highway numbering system had not yet been implemented. Portions of the freeway began to be completed and opened in 1959 with the new Interstate Highway funding, and they were later marked as SR 1 (the Interstate Highway numbers did not go up until 1962). Since large gaps existed along the corridor where no freeway had yet been completed, existing two-lane or four-lane highways were designated as Temporary SR 1 in order to complete the route.

SR 1 was rerouted as sections of Interstate opened.

The SR 1 signage was removed in 1965 as the Interstate Highway numbers adequately marked the route and the state highway numbering was superfluous. The present day route of what was once planned as SR 1 is Interstate 71 from Cincinnati to just northeast of Medina, Interstate 271 for its entire length from northeast of Medina to Willoughby Hills, and Interstate 90 from Willoughby Hills to the Pennsylvania state line at Conneaut.

Since 1965, there has been no highway designated as SR 1.

== Route description (1961) ==
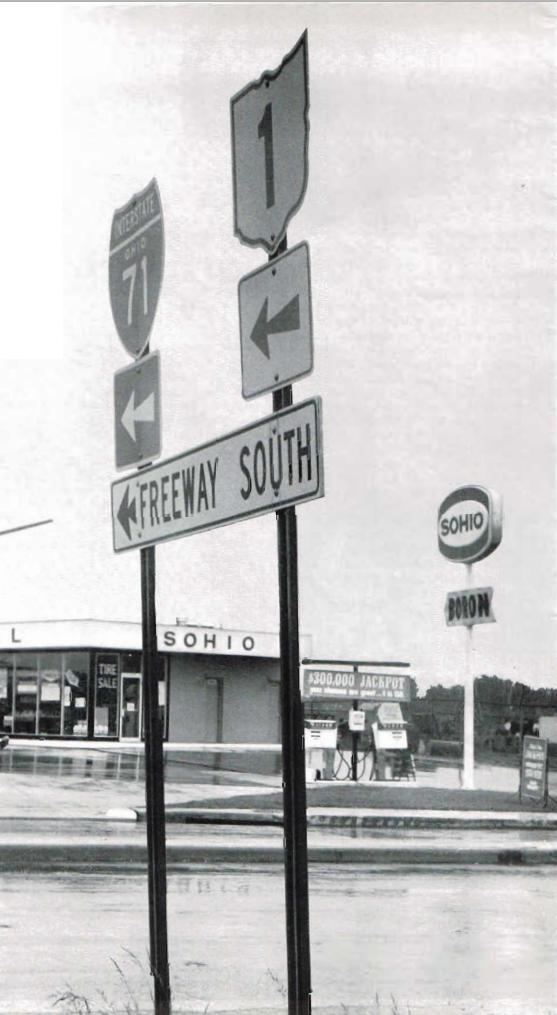
Columbus-area highway marker designating Interstate 71 and Ohio Route 1 (1965).

In 1961, SR 1 followed Central Ave. in Cincinnati, to John Street, to Lincoln Park Drive (now Ezzard Charles Drive), to Freeman Avenue, to Western Avenue, to Spring Grove Avenue, to Colerain Avenue to Interstate 75 (at what is now the I-75/I-74 interchange); Interstate 75 from current I-74 interchange to West Carrollton; U.S. Route 25 (Dixie Drive) from West Carrollton to Interstate 70; Interstate 70 from Dixie Drive to near Enon (the current I-70/SR 4 split); State Route 4 from near Enon to Springfield; U.S. Route 40 from Springfield to Columbus; Broad St. (US 40) in Columbus, to 4th Street, to Summit/3rd Street (US 23), to Hudson Street, to Interstate 71; I-71 from Columbus to just east of Medina (the only portion of Interstate 71 complete at the time); State Route 18 from near Medina to Montrose; U.S. Route 21 from Montrose to Brecksville; State Route 82 from Brecksville to Aurora; (an alternate SR 1 ran from Twinsburg southeast along State Route 14 to Streetsboro and then on State Route 43 to Aurora, in order to connect SR 1 to the Ohio Turnpike;) State Route 306 from Aurora to State Route 84; SR 84 from State Route 306 to just west of what was then State Route 44; due south to Interstate 90 along what is now a section of SR 44; and finally Interstate 90 to the Pennsylvania state line.

== Major intersections (1964) ==
County	Location	mi	km	Destinations	Notes
Hamilton	Cincinnati	0.00	0.00	I-75 north / US 25	Southern Terminus at Kentucky state line; southern end of I-75 concurrency; southern terminus of US 25 concurrency
See Interstate 75 Exits 1–61
Montgomery	West Carrollton	47.31	76.14	I-75	Northern terminus of I-75 segment;
Montgomery	Moraine			SR 741	
Montgomery	Dayton	54.97	88.47	SR 48	Southern terminus of SR 48 concurrency
Montgomery	Dayton	55.69	89.62	US 35 / SR 4	Southern terminus of SR 4 concurrency
Montgomery	Dayton			SR 49	Southern terminus of SR 49
Montgomery	Dayton	56.60	91.09	US 25 / SR 48 / SR 69	Northern terminus of US 25 and SR 48 concurrency; southern terminus of SR 69 concurrency
Montgomery	Dayton			SR 202 north	Southern terminus of SR 202
Montgomery	Dayton			SR 201 north	Southern terminus of SR 201
Montgomery	Dayton			SR 444 north	Southern terminus of SR 444
Montgomery	Wayne Township			SR 235 north	Northern terminus of SR 235
Montgomery	Wayne Township	78.1	125.7	I-70 / US 40 / SR 69	Northern end of SR 69 concurrency; east end of I-70 and US 40 concurrency
Clark	Mad River Township	84.39	135.81	I-70	Eastern end of I-70; east end of I-70 concurrency
Clark	Bethel Township			SR 369	
Clark	Springfield Township	89.89	144.66	SR 440 west	Eastern terminus of SR 440
Clark	Springfield			US 68	
Clark	Springfield			SR 41	Northern end of SR 41 concurrency
Clark	Springfield			SR 4	Northern end of SR 4 concurrency
Clark	Springfield			SR 41	Southern end of SR 41 concurrency
Clark	South Vienna			SR 54	
Madison	Summerford			SR 56	
Madison	Summerford			SR 38	
Madison	Lafayette			US 42	
Madison	West Jefferson			SR 29	Western terminus of SR 29
Madison	West Jefferson			SR 142	Western terminus of SR 142
Franklin	Columbus			US 62	East end of US 62 concurrency
Franklin	Columbus	137.07	220.59	I-71 / US 40 / US 62	Southern terminus of I-71 concurrency; east end of US 40 and US 62 concurrency
See Interstate 71 Exits 108B–204
Medina	Westfield Township			I-80S / US 224 – Lodi, Akron	
Medina	Medina Township	247.30	397.99	I-71 south / SR 18 west	Northern terminus of completed I-71; north end of concurrency; west end of SR 18 concurrency
Medina	Sharon–Granger township line	250.41	403.00	SR 94	
Summit	Copley Township	254.83	410.11	US 21 south / SR 18 west	Southern terminus of US 21 concurrency; north end of SR 18 concurrency
Summit	Montrose-Ghent	257.04	413.67	I-77 / SR 176	Southern terminus of SR 176 concurrency; southern terminus of I-77
Summit	Richfield			SR 176 north	Northern terminus of SR 176 concurrency
Summit	Richfield			SR 303	
Summit	Richfield	264.58	425.80	I-77	Northern end of concurrency and terminus of completed I-77
Summit	Richfield	265.38	427.09	Ohio Turnpike	
Cuyahoga	Brecksville			SR 82	
Cuyahoga	Independence			SR 17	
Cuyahoga	Cleveland			SR 14 / SR 43	Southern terminus of SR 14 and SR 43 concurrency
Cuyahoga	Cleveland			SR 10 west	Eastern terminus of SR 10
Cuyahoga	Cleveland			US 422 / SR 8 / SR 87	Southern end of US 422 and SR 87 concurrency
Cuyahoga	Cleveland	281.58	453.16	I-90 / US 21 / US 422 / SR 14 / SR 8 / SR 43 / SR 87	Western terminus of I-90 concurrency; northern end of US 21 / US 422 / SR 14 / SR 43 / SR 87 concurrency
Cuyahoga	Cleveland			SR 2 west	Western end of SR 2 concurrency
Cuyahoga	Cleveland			SR 283 west	Western end of SR 283 concurrency
Cuyahoga	Bratenahl			SR 283 east	Eastern terminus of concurrency with SR 283
Cuyahoga	Cleveland			SR 175	
Cuyahoga	Cleveland			SR 2 east	Eastern terminus of concurrency with SR 2
Cuyahoga–Lake county line	Euclid–Wickliffe line			US 20 (Euclid Avenue)	
Lake	Wickliffe			SR 84	
Lake	Willoughby Hills			I-271 south / I-290 west	Northern terminus of I-271 and I-290
See Interstate 90 Exits 188–241
Ashtabula	Conneaut	353.15	568.34	I-90 east	Continuation into Pennsylvania; Northern terminus of SR 1
1.000 mi = 1.609 km; 1.000 km = 0.621 mi: Concurrency terminus
