= Ohio State Route 6 =

State Route 6

Route information
- Maintained by ODOT

Location
- Country: United States
- State: Ohio

Highway system
- Ohio State Highway System; Interstate; US; State; Scenic
← US 6	→ SR 7

In Ohio, State Route 6 may refer to:

- U.S. Route 6 in Ohio, the only Ohio highway numbered 6 since 1931
- Ohio State Route 6 (1923-1927), now SR 4 (Cincinnati to Middletown), SR 73 (Middletown to Franklin), and old US 25 (Franklin to Michigan)
- Ohio State Route 6 (1927), now US 250
- Ohio State Route 6 (pre-1931), now SR 283
