= Ohio State Route 90 =

State Route 90

Route information
- Maintained by ODOT

Location
- Country: United States
- State: Ohio

Highway system
- Ohio State Highway System; Interstate; US; State; Scenic
← I-90	→ SR 91

In Ohio, State Route 90 may refer to:

- Interstate 90 in Ohio, the only Ohio highway numbered 90 since about 1962
- Ohio State Route 90 (1923), now SR 193 (North Kingsville to Youngstown), SR 170 (Youngstown to Petersburg), and SR 617 (Petersburg to Pennsylvania)
