= Ohio State Route 611 =

State highway in Lorain County, Ohio, US

State Route 611

Route information
- Maintained by ODOT
- Length: 11.13 mi (17.91 km)
- Existed: 1937–present

Major junctions
- West end: US 6 in Lorain
- SR 58 in Lorain SR 57 in Lorain SR 301 in Sheffield I-90 / SR 2 in Avon
- East end: SR 254 in Avon

Location
- Country: United States
- State: Ohio
- Counties: Lorain

Highway system
- Ohio State Highway System; Interstate; US; State; Scenic
← SR 609	→ SR 612

State Route 611 (SR 611) is an east–west state highway in the northern portion of the U.S. state of Ohio. The western terminus of SR 611 is at a partial interchange with US 6 in Lorain. Its eastern terminus is at a signalized intersection with SR 254 in Avon.

== Route description ==
The entirety of SR 611 exists within northern Lorain County. No part of the highway is included as a component of the National Highway System.

== History ==
SR 611 was designated in 1937. Originally, the highway began at US 6 where it meets Colorado Avenue east of where US 6 crosses the Black River near downtown Lorain and followed Colorado Avenue southeast to where the current SR 611 comes in at the intersection with Kansas Avenue and Henderson Drive. From there, the highway was routed along its current alignment to its eastern terminus at SR 254 in Avon.

In 1946, SR 611 took on the alignment that it follows today, as the result of a westward extension. From the intersection of Colorado Avenue, Kansas Avenue and Henderson Drive in Lorain, the highway was re-routed south onto Henderson Drive, which is used to cross the Black River, then turned southwesterly into a connection with 21st Street, which it followed heading west across Lorain to its current western terminus at US 6 in the northwestern portion of the city.

== Major intersections ==
The entire route is in Lorain County.

Location	mi	km	Destinations	Notes
Lorain	0.00	0.00	US 6 / LECT west (West Erie Avenue)	Partial interchange; access provided from US 6 eastbound to SR 611 eastbound, and from SR 611 westbound to US 6 westbound (via SR 611-D) only
Lorain	1.14	1.83	SR 58 (North Leavitt Road) – Vermilion, Amherst	
Lorain	3.02	4.86	SR 57 (Broadway) to I-90 / SR 2 / Ohio Turnpike – Lorain, Elyria	
Sheffield	8.58	13.81	SR 301 (North Abbe Road)	
Avon	9.78	15.74	I-90 / SR 2 – Toledo, Cleveland	Exit 148 (I-90/SR 2)
Avon	11.13	17.91	SR 254 (Detroit Road)	
1.000 mi = 1.609 km; 1.000 km = 0.621 mi: Incomplete access
