= Ohio State Route 615 =

State highway in Lake County, Ohio, US

State Route 615

Route information
- Maintained by ODOT
- Length: 6.93 mi (11.15 km)
- Existed: 1937–present

Major junctions
- South end: SR 306 in Kirtland
- I-90 in Mentor; US 20 in Mentor; SR 2 in Mentor
- North end: SR 283 in Mentor-on-the-Lake

Location
- Country: United States
- State: Ohio
- Counties: Lake

Highway system
- Ohio State Highway System; Interstate; US; State; Scenic
← SR 614	→ SR 616

State Route 615 (SR 615) is a 6.93-mile-long (11.15 km) north–south state highway in the northeastern portion of the U.S. state of Ohio. SR 615 runs from its southern terminus at a signalized intersection with SR 306 in Kirtland to its northern terminus at a signalized intersection with SR 283 in Mentor-on-the-Lake.

== Route description ==
The entirety of SR 615 exists within Lake County. The highway begins at a signalized intersection with SR 306 in Kirtland, and follows a portion of Chillicothe Road running northeast into Kirtland Hills until its intersection with Center Street. It then turns to the north, intersecting Interstate 90 (I-90) at a diamond interchange as it passes into Mentor. Continuing to the north, SR 615 crosses SR 84 and U.S. Route 20 (US 20). After its junction with the SR 2 freeway at a diamond interchange, it stays on Center Street until the intersection with Munson Road. Turning west on Munson, the route heads toward its northern terminus at a signalized intersection with SR 283 in Mentor-on-the-Lake.

No portion of SR 615 is included as a part of the National Highway System.

== History ==
The SR 615 designation was established in 1937. The highway has utilized essentially the same routing between SR 306 and SR 283 through Kirtland, Kirtland Hills and Mentor throughout its history. In 2001 the route at the southern end was realigned slightly north to accommodate the construction of Historic Kirtland Village; The Church of Jesus Christ of Latter-day Saints provided all funding for the reroute and related construction.

Prior to 2003, SR 615 traveled over I-90 in the southern end of Mentor without any direct connection. Consequential to this portion of Lake County experiencing growth, on November 24, 2003, a new interchange was opened linking SR 615 with the Interstate.

== Major intersections ==
The entire route is in Lake County.

Location	mi	km	Destinations	Notes
Kirtland	0.00	0.00	SR 306 (Kirtland Road) / Eisenhower Drive	
Mentor	1.89	3.04	I-90 – Cleveland, Buffalo, NY	Exit 195 (I-90)
Mentor	2.82	4.54	SR 84 (Johnnycake Ridge Road)	
Mentor	3.32	5.34	US 20 (Mentor Avenue)	
Mentor	4.69	7.55	SR 2 – Cleveland, Erie, PA	Interchange
Mentor-on-the-Lake	6.93	11.15	SR 283 / LECT (Lake Shore Boulevard / Andrews Road) – Cleveland, Erie, PA	
1.000 mi = 1.609 km; 1.000 km = 0.621 mi
