= Ohio State Route 535 =

State highway in Lake County, Ohio, US

State Route 535

Route information
- Maintained by ODOT
- Length: 4.85 mi (7.81 km)
- Existed: 1937–present

Major junctions
- West end: SR 283 in Painesville
- SR 2 near Painesville
- East end: US 20 near Painesville

Location
- Country: United States
- State: Ohio
- Counties: Lake

Highway system
- Ohio State Highway System; Interstate; US; State; Scenic
← SR 534	→ SR 536

State Route 535 (SR 535) is an east–west state highway in the northeastern portion of the U.S. state of Ohio. The western terminus of State Route 535 is at a signalized intersection with State Route 283 in the northwestern portion of Painesville, and just north of State Route 283's interchange with State Route 2. The route's eastern terminus is at a signalized T-intersection with U.S. Route 20 about 1.25 miles (2.01 km) northeast of Painesville.

Created in the late 1930s, the route begins on a portion of Richmond Street which becomes High Street in Fairport Harbor; the route then follows East Street toward the north. It then turns east onto Fairport Nursery Road, following that road all the way to its terminus at U.S. Route 20, which is just east of State Route 535's interchange with State Route 2.

== Route description ==
The entirety of State Route 535 exists in the Painesville vicinity in central Lake County. The highway is not included as a part of the National Highway System a network of highways deemed most vital to the nation's economy, mobility and defense.

== History ==
SR 535 was designated in 1937. The highway maintains the same routing in the Painesville vicinity today that it had when it was first designated, and has not experienced any major changes.

== Major intersections ==
The entire route is in Lake County.

Location	mi	km	Destinations	Notes
Painesville	0.00	0.00	SR 283 / LECT (Richmond Street)	
Painesville Township	4.69	7.55	SR 2 west – Cleveland	Partial interchange; access provided from SR 2 eastbound to SR 535, and from SR 535 to SR 2 westbound only
Painesville Township	4.85	7.81	US 20 / LECT (Ridge Road)	
1.000 mi = 1.609 km; 1.000 km = 0.621 mi: Incomplete access
