= Ohio State Route 91 =

State highway in northeastern Ohio, US

State Route 91

Route information
- Maintained by ODOT
- Length: 44.12 mi (71.00 km)
- Existed: 1912–present

Major junctions
- South end: US 224 / CR 66 in Springfield Township
- I-480 / SR 14 in Twinsburg; US 422 in Solon; US 322 in Mayfield Heights; US 6 in Willoughby Hills; I-90 in Willoughby Hills; US 20 in Willoughby
- North end: SR 283 on Timberlake/Eastlake border

Location
- Country: United States
- State: Ohio
- Counties: Summit, Cuyahoga, Lake

Highway system
- Ohio State Highway System; Interstate; US; State; Scenic
← SR 90	→ SR 92

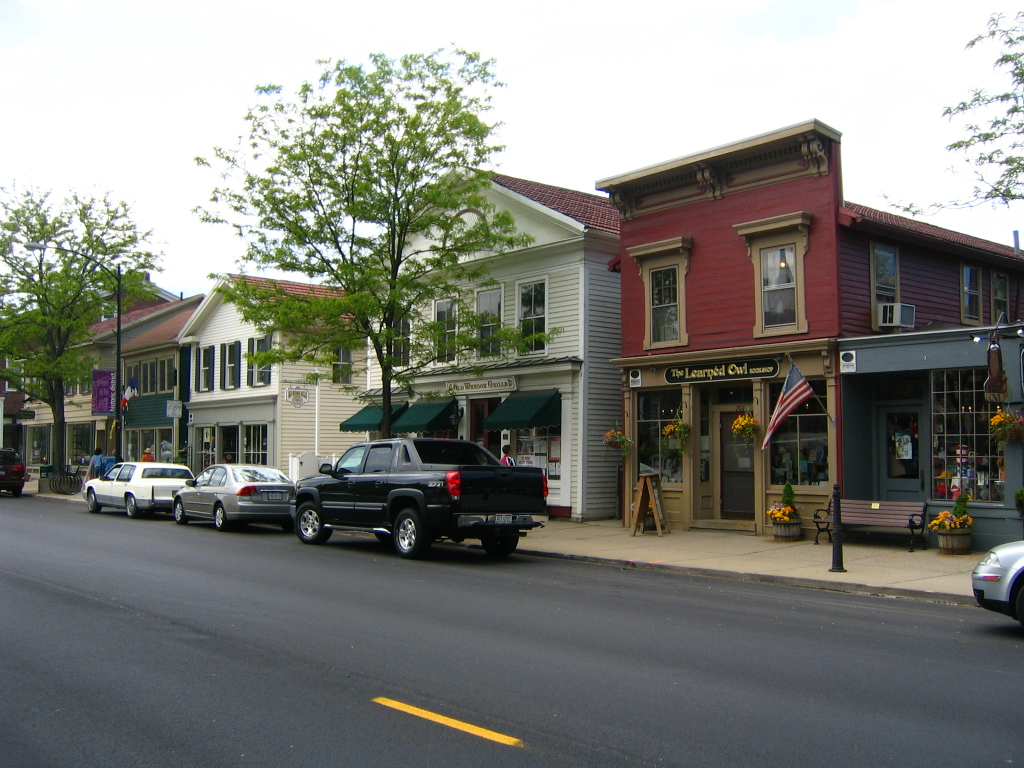
State Route 91 in Hudson

State Route 91 (SR 91), formerly known as Inter-county Highway 91 until 1921 and State Highway 91 in 1922, is a north–south state highway in the northeastern portion of the U.S. state of Ohio. Its southern terminus is at U.S. Route 224 (East Waterloo Road) in Springfield Township, east of Akron. Its northern terminus is at State Route 283 (Lakeshore Boulevard) on the Timberlake/Eastlake border less than one mile (1.6 km) south of Lake Erie.

The route is known as Canton Road from its southern terminus to just north of its interchange with Interstate 76 in Akron (Canton Road continues south as County Route 66, a former portion of State Route 8). North of this interchange, it is called Darrow Road until it enters the city of Tallmadge, where it is named South Avenue south of the Tallmadge Circle, and North Avenue north of the circle. It next passes through the Munroe Falls village limits and is known as South Main Street and North Main Street. It becomes Darrow Road once again in the city of Stow and for its remaining length in Summit County, aside from within the Hudson city limits, where it is South and North Main Streets.

In Cuyahoga and Lake Counties, State Route 91 is known as SOM Center Road, named for the fact that it runs through the centers of the original Solon, Orange, and Mayfield Townships in Cuyahoga County.

The State Route 91 corridor includes examples of Connecticut Western Reserve town planning, particularly the public squares of Hudson, Tallmadge, and Mayfield. It also dissects several affluent communities of Northeast Ohio, including Hudson, Gates Mills, Pepper Pike, Hunting Valley, Moreland Hills and Solon .

== History ==
- 1912 – Route runs from Stow to Chagrin Falls
- 1923 – Rerouted from Stow to three miles (4.8 km) east of Wickliffe
- 1930 – Extended south through Tallmadge and Munroe Falls to 3 miles (4.8 km) north of Lakemore along a previously unnumbered road
- 1966 – Upgraded to four lanes from U.S. Route 6 to three miles (4.8 km) east of Wickliffe by this time
- 1970 – Extended south to U.S. Route 224 in Springfield Township along former State Route 8 alignment; extended north to Eastlake as a divided highway

== Major intersections ==
County	Location	mi	km	Destinations	Notes
Summit	Springfield Township	0.00	0.00	US 224 (East Waterloo Road) / CR 66 (South Canton Road) – Lakemore	
Summit	Akron	1.81	2.91	SR 18 west (East Market Street) / Robindale Avenue	Eastern terminus of SR 18
Summit	Tallmadge	5.01– 5.10	8.06– 8.21	SR 261 to I-76 – Brimfield, Kent, Cuyahoga Falls, Akron	Tallmadge Circle
Summit	Stow	9.10	14.65	SR 59 (Kent Road)	
Summit	Hudson	14.67	23.61	SR 303 (Streetsboro Street)	
Summit	Twinsburg	19.15– 19.26	30.82– 31.00	I-480 / SR 14 – Youngstown, Cleveland	Exit 37 (I-480)
Summit	Twinsburg	19.60	31.54	SR 82 (East Aurora Road)	
Cuyahoga	Solon	24.71	39.77	SR 43 (Aurora Road)	
Cuyahoga	Solon	25.32– 25.52	40.75– 41.07	US 422 – Warren, Cleveland	Exit 18 (US 422)
Cuyahoga	Pepper Pike	30.00	48.28	SR 87 (Woodland Road)	
Cuyahoga	Mayfield Heights	34.20	55.04	US 322 (Mayfield Road) to I-271	
Lake	Willoughby Hills	38.86	62.54	US 6 (Chardon Road)	
Lake	Willoughby Hills	39.66– 40.00	63.83– 64.37	I-90 – Erie, Pa., Cleveland	Exit 189 (I-90)
Lake	Willoughby	40.23	64.74	SR 84 (Ridge Road)	
Lake	Willoughby	41.45	66.71	US 20 (Euclid Avenue)	
Lake	Eastlake	42.15– 42.26	67.83– 68.01	SR 2 – Painesville, Cleveland	Exit 211 (SR 2)
Lake	Eastlake	42.68	68.69	SR 640 (Vine Street)	
Lake	Timberlake–Eastlake line	44.12	71.00	SR 283 / LECT (Lakeshore Boulevard)	
1.000 mi = 1.609 km; 1.000 km = 0.621 mi
