= Ohio State Route 640 =

State highway in Lake County, Ohio, US

State Route 640

Route information
- Maintained by O.D.O.T.
- Length: 3.35 mi (5.39 km)
- Existed: 1941–present
- History: 1931–1940 (as State Route 288)

Major junctions
- West end: SR 283 in Willowick
- SR 2 in Willoughby
- East end: US 20 / SR 174 in Willoughby

Location
- Country: United States
- State: Ohio
- Counties: Lake

Highway system
- Ohio State Highway System; Interstate; US; State; Scenic
← SR 638	→ SR 643

State Route 640 (SR 640) is an east–west state highway in the northeastern portion of the U.S. state of Ohio. SR 640 has its western terminus is at a signalized intersection with SR 283 (Lakeshore Boulevard) in Willowick. Its eastern terminus is in downtown Willoughby at a signalized intersection where it meets US 20 and SR 174, the latter of which has its northern terminus at this same intersection.

Located entirely within the western part of Lake County, SR 640 serves the northeastern Cleveland suburbs of Willowick, Eastlake and Willoughby. Known as Vine Street for its entire length, this stretch of roadway carried the designation of SR 288 prior to being re-designated as SR 640 in the early 1940s.

== Route description ==
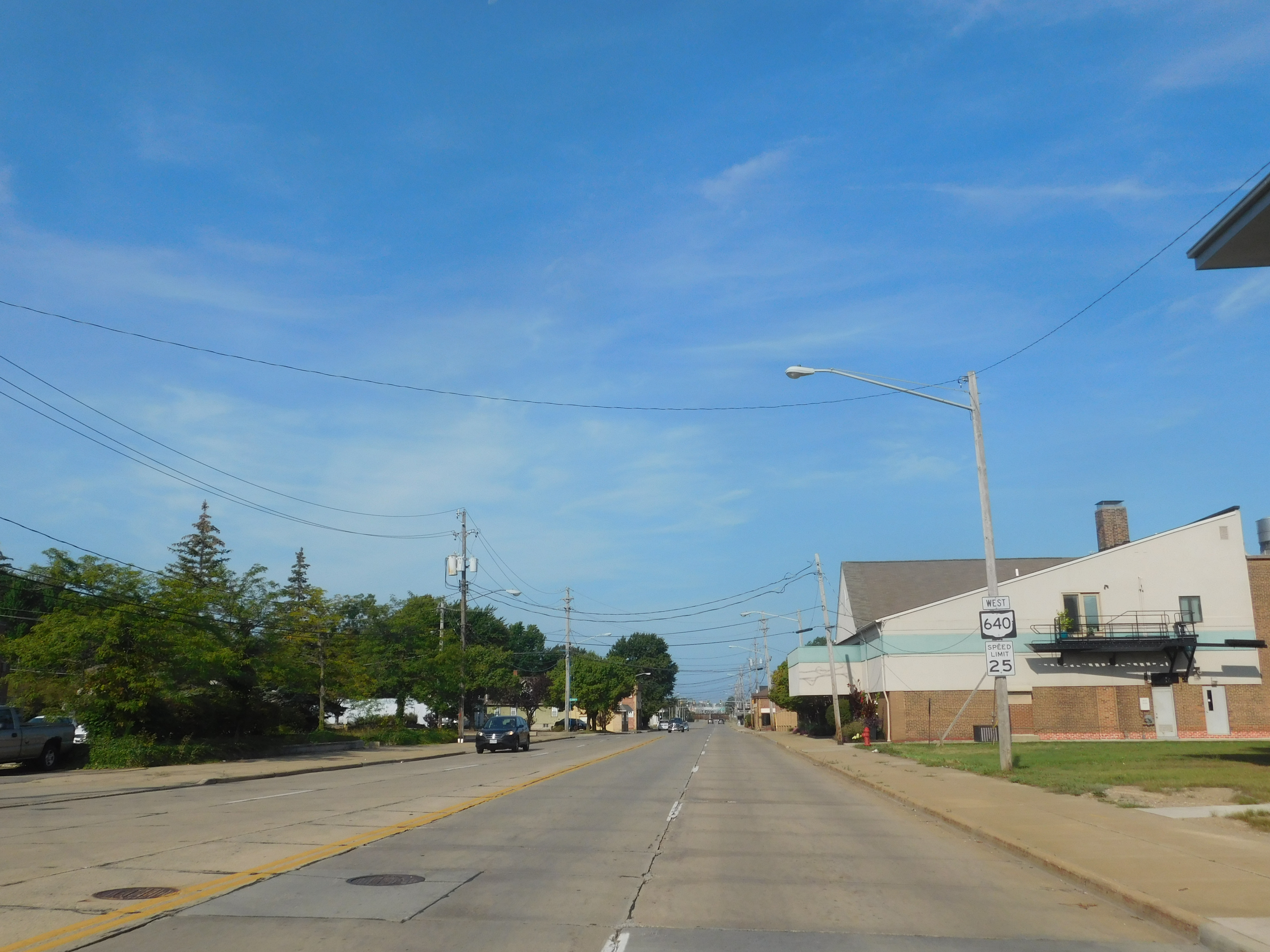
SR 640 westbound in Willoughby

SR 640 runs entirely within western Lake County in the northeastern suburbs of Cleveland. Starting at the highway's western terminus, the highway is three lanes with a center turn lane. The highway widens to four lanes when it crosses into Eastlake, and remains four lanes for the remainder of its length. The highway passes mostly chain retailers and apartment complexes along its length. It passes just north of Classic Park near the intersection with SR 91 (S.O.M. Center Road).

No portion of the highway is included within the National Highway System, a network of highways deemed most important for the country's economy, mobility and defense.

== History ==
In 1941, SR 640 was designated along the path that it maintains to this day between Willowick and Willoughby in western Lake County. SR 640 replaced the stretch of roadway that was designated as SR 288 prior to 1941. No changes of major significance have taken place to the route since its inception.

== Major intersections ==
The entire route is in Lake County.

Location	mi	km	Destinations	Notes
Willowick	0.00	0.00	SR 283 / LECT (Lake Shore Boulevard)	
Eastlake	1.74	2.80	SR 91 (Som Center Road)	
Willoughby	2.35	3.78	SR 2 – Cleveland, Painesville	Interchange
Willoughby	3.35	5.39	US 20 south / SR 174 (Mentor Avenue / Erie Street)	Northern terminus of SR 174
1.000 mi = 1.609 km; 1.000 km = 0.621 mi
