= Main Avenue Bridge =

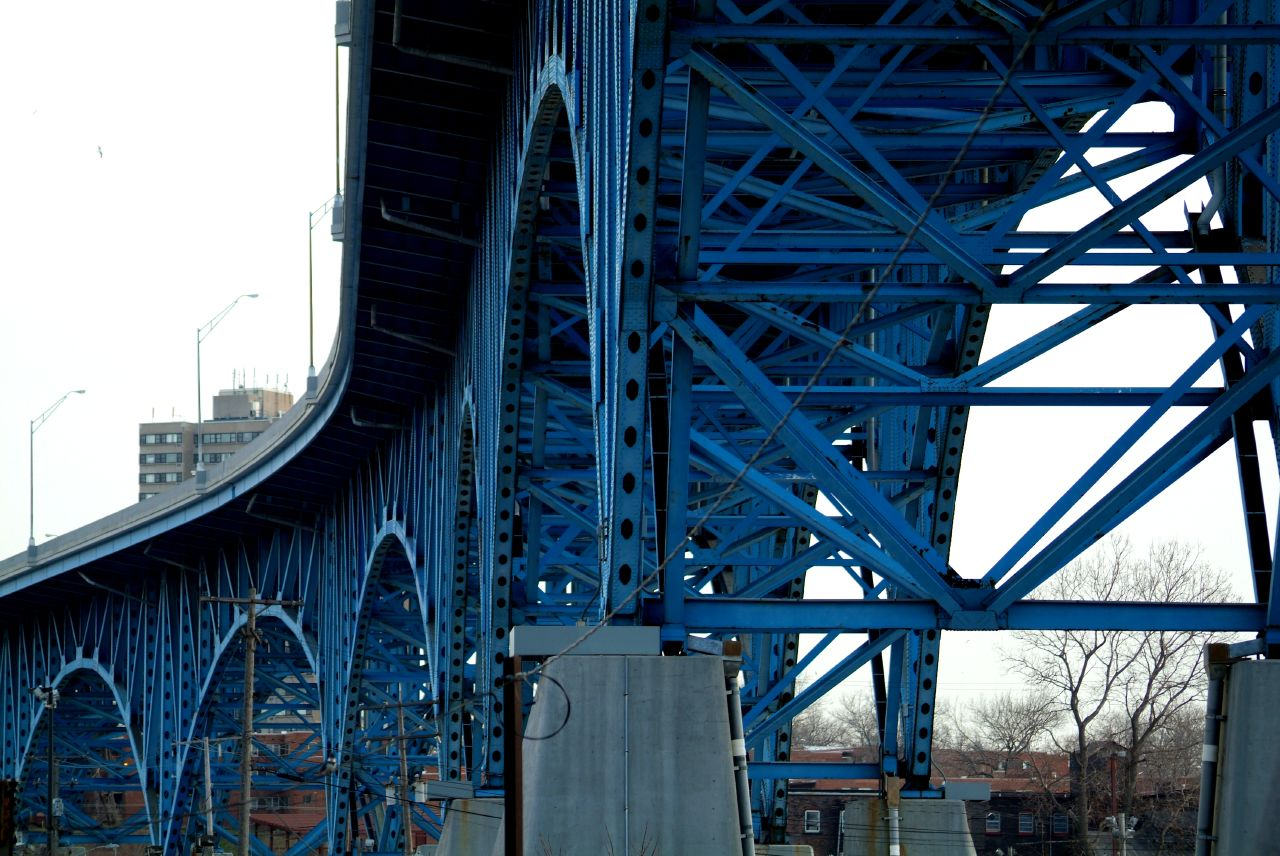
- Bridge in 2005
- Coordinates: 41°29′55″N 81°42′18″W
- Carries: OH 2
- Crosses: Cuyahoga River
- Locale: Cleveland, Ohio
- ID number: 1800035

Characteristics
- Design: Metal-Riveted Cantilever Deck Truss, Stationary
- Total length: 6,580 feet (2,010 m); 8,000 feet (2,400 m) including ramps
- Width: 82 feet (25 m)
- Longest span: 120 m
- Clearance above: 100 feet (30 m) (over river)
- Clearance below: 96 feet (29 m)

History
- Construction end: 1939
- Opened: 1939

Location
- Interactive map of Main Avenue Bridge

The Main Avenue (Harold H. Burton Memorial) Bridge (alternately Main Avenue Viaduct) is a cantilever truss bridge in Cleveland, Ohio carrying Ohio State Route 2/Cleveland Memorial Shoreway over the Cuyahoga River. The bridge, completed in 1939, is 8,000 feet (2,400 m) in length, and was the longest elevated structure in Ohio until the 2007 completion of the Veterans' Glass City Skyway in Toledo. It was named for Harold H. Burton, 45th mayor of Cleveland, in late January 1986. The bridge replaced an 1869 bridge at the same site, and was built in conjunction with construction of the Cleveland Memorial Shoreway.

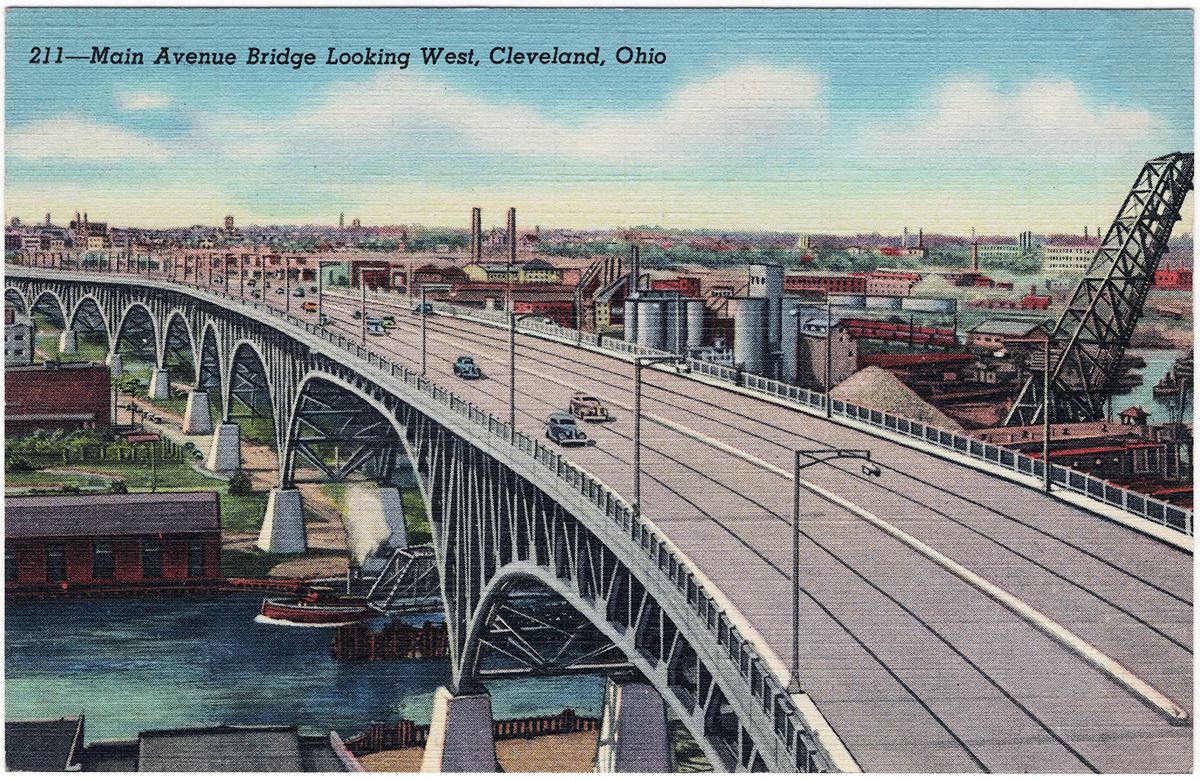
Main Avenue Bridge Looking West, Cleveland, Ohio vintage postcard

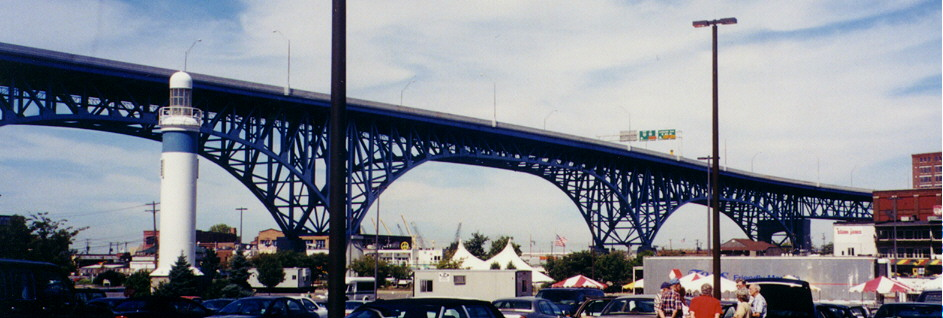
Looking north, 1999

The bridge received extensive renovations 1991–1992; it subsequently received major structural repairs in 2007 and again in 2012–2013, both instances necessitating re-routing of large vehicles.

In 2013, the Federal Highway Administration listed the Main Avenue Bridge as "structurally deficient" and "fracture critical".

The bridge has been designated as a National Historic Civil Engineering Landmark by the American Society of Civil Engineers.

== See also ==
- List of crossings of the Cuyahoga River
