= Ohio State Route 254 =

State highway in northern Ohio, US

State Route 254

Route information
- Maintained by ODOT
- Length: 17.15 mi (27.60 km)
- Existed: 1929–present

Major junctions
- West end: SR 57 near Lorain
- I-90 / SR 2 near Lorain; I-90 / SR 2 in Rocky River
- East end: US 6 / US 20 / SR 2 in Lakewood

Location
- Country: United States
- State: Ohio
- Counties: Lorain, Cuyahoga

Highway system
- Ohio State Highway System; Interstate; US; State; Scenic
← SR 253	→ SR 255

State Route 254 (SR 254) is a 17.15 miles (27.60 km) east–west state route in northern Ohio. The route begins at State Route 57 in Lorain and ends at U.S. Route 20 in Lakewood. SR 254 intersects Interstate 90 twice, both times near its endpoints. State Route 254 is known as Detroit Road for most of its routing, and as North Ridge Road at its western end.

The route has a signed eastern terminus at the intersection of Detroit Road and Wooster Road, which is also the signed terminus of SR 113 and where a brief concurrency with US 20 and Alternate US 6 begins. The designated route continues via an unsigned concurrency with SR 2 from the Marion Ramp in Rocky River rejoining of US 6. From there, it continues on Clifton Boulevard before ending at the intersection of Clifton and West Clifton Boulevards (the terminus of SR 237 and the unsigned terminus of SR 113), where US 20 joins US 6 and SR 2 for a triple concurrency on Clifton Boulevard through Lakewood.

The signed portion of State Route 254 on Detroit Road from the Marion Ramp to the intersection of Detroit Road and Wooster Road is officially known as State Route 254-D. SR 254-D also briefly travels north on West Lake Road (US 6 Alternate) unsigned before terminating at Old Detroit Road.

== Major intersections ==
=== SR 254 ===
County	Location	mi	km	Destinations	Notes
Lorain	Sheffield Township	0.00	0.00	SR 57 (Lorain Boulevard) / North Ridge Road – Lorain, Elyria	
Lorain	Sheffield	1.91	3.07	I-90 / SR 2 – Toledo, Cleveland	Exit 148 (I-90)
Lorain	Sheffield	2.28	3.67	SR 301 (Abbe Road)	
Lorain	Avon	5.09	8.19	SR 611 west (Colorado Avenue)	Eastern terminus of SR 611
Lorain	Avon	6.02	9.69	SR 83 (Center Road)	
Cuyahoga	Westlake	12.50	20.12	SR 252 (Columbia Road) to I-90 / SR 2	
Cuyahoga	Rocky River	14.77	23.77	I-90 west / SR 2 west – Toledo	Exit 161 (I-90); eastbound exit from I-90 / westbound entrance to I-90 only; western end of SR 2 concurrency
Cuyahoga	Rocky River	16.18	26.04	SR 254-D (Detroit Road) to US 6 Alt.	Western terminus of unsigned SR 254-D (signed SR 254)
Cuyahoga	Rocky River	16.29	26.22	US 6 east (Clifton Boulevard)	Access to US 6 eastbound / from US 6 westbound only; western end of US 6 concurrency
Cuyahoga	Lakewood	17.15	27.60	US 6 / LECT east / US 20 / SR 2 east / SR 237 south (Clifton Boulevard / West Clifton Boulevard)	Eastern end of US 6 / SR 2 concurrency; northern terminus of SR 237; unsigned eastern terminus of SR 113
1.000 mi = 1.609 km; 1.000 km = 0.621 mi: Concurrency terminus

=== SR 254-D ===
The entire route is in Rocky River, Cuyahoga County.

mi	km	Destinations	Notes
0.00	0.00	SR 2 / SR 254 (Detroit Road / Marion Ramp)	
0.34	0.55	US 6 Alt. east / US 20 / SR 113 (Detroit Road / Wooster Road)	Western end of US 6 Alt. concurrency
0.41	0.66	US 6 Alt. west (West Lake Road) / Old Detroit Road	Eastern end of US 6 Alt. concurrency
1.000 mi = 1.609 km; 1.000 km = 0.621 mi: Concurrency terminus
