= Ohio State Route 2 =

State highway in Ohio, United States

State Route 2
- Route of SR 2 highlighted in red

Route information
- Maintained by ODOT (outside of cities)
- Length: 227.13 mi (365.53 km)
- Existed: 1912–present
- Tourist routes: Lake Erie Circle Tour

Major junctions
- West end: SR 37 near Hicksville
- I-80 / I-90 / Ohio Turnpike near Swanton; I-475 / US 23 near Toledo; I-280 / LECT near Toledo; I-90 in Elyria; I-90 / SR 254 in Rocky River; I-90 in Cleveland; I-90 in Euclid; SR 44 in Mentor; SR 44 in Painesville Township
- East end: US 20 in Painesville Township

Location
- Country: United States
- State: Ohio
- Counties: Defiance, Williams, Fulton, Lucas, Ottawa, Erie, Lorain, Cuyahoga, Lake

Highway system
- Ohio State Highway System; Interstate; US; State; Scenic
← SR 1	→ SR 3
← US 23	SR 23	→ US 24

State Route 2 (SR 2), formerly known as Inter-county Highway 2 until 1921 and State Highway 2 in 1922, is an east–west highway crossing most of northern Ohio and the fourth longest state route. Its western terminus is at the Indiana state line near Hicksville where the route becomes Indiana State Road 37 which continues to Fort Wayne, Indiana. The eastern terminus of the route is in Painesville Township in Lake County at U.S. Route 20 (US 20).

== Route description ==
It passes through Bryan, Wauseon (where it briefly becomes a couplet), and enters greater Toledo west of its interchange with the Ohio Turnpike. It continues east from greater Toledo and soon parallels Lake Erie, becoming a freeway near Port Clinton. From Oregon to Sandusky SR 2 is part of 293 miles (472 km) of the highway designated the "Lake Erie Coastal Ohio Trail". and on September 22, 2005, was designated a National Scenic Byway. From Toledo to Sandusky the highway is also part of and designated the Lake Erie Circle Tour that is also part of the 6,500-mile (10,500 km) "Great Lakes Circle Tour". It then passes Sandusky, where it meets U.S. Route 250 (US 250) and US 6, and separates from the lakeshore as a freeway, and traverses rural Erie County before entering Lorain County. Near Elyria, it joins Interstate 90 (I-90), whose route it shares to Rocky River, where it follows SR 254 along Detroit Road into Lakewood. Here it again joins US 6, as well as US 20 on Clifton Boulevard. It then becomes part of the Cleveland Memorial Shoreway in Cleveland, joining I-90 again near Burke Lakefront Airport. These two highways split near Euclid, and SR 2 continues along the Lakeland Freeway to Painesville, feeding into US 20 eastbound. SR 2 serves as an access route to lakeshore attractions on Lake Erie from Toledo and Cleveland and as an alternative to the Ohio Turnpike.

The stretch of SR 2 from Toledo to Sandusky passes several attractions. The Ottawa National Wildlife Refuge is just east of SR 19 in Carroll Township. It sits on 733 acres (297 ha) along with the Davis–Besse Nuclear Power Station.

While Ohio state-numbered routes within cities are usually maintained by those cities (see Numbered highways in Ohio), SR 2 within the cities in the section in Lake County is maintained by the county.

SR 2 is the lowest numbered state route in Ohio. The SR 1 designation was removed in 1965.

=== Cleveland Memorial Shoreway ===
The Cleveland Memorial Shoreway, often shortened to "the Shoreway", is a limited-access freeway in Cleveland and Bratenahl. It closely follows the shore of Lake Erie and connects the east and west sides of Cleveland via the Main Avenue Bridge over the Cuyahoga River. The entire length of the Shoreway is part of SR 2 and the Lake Erie Circle Tour; the Shoreway also carries parts of I-90 and SR 283 on its eastern side and parts of US 6 and US 20 on its western side. The Cleveland neighborhood of Detroit-Shoreway is named after the two roads that form the northern border, the Shoreway and Detroit Avenue.

The Shoreway was originally constructed in 1936 under the Works Progress Administration (WPA) and was extended in both directions during the 1930s and 1940s, finally completed and widened in 1953. Later in the 1950s, it was connected with additional freeways. It was named in honor of the city's war veterans during World War II. Between 2014 and 2018, the West Shoreway, the portion of the Shoreway from the Cuyahoga River westward, was reconstructed in order to increase ease of access to Lake Erie; the project included a speed limit reduction and various other feature modifications, though not as many as originally planned. Since the reconstruction, this section is also called Edgewater Parkway.

=== Lakeland Freeway ===
The Lakeland Freeway links Cleveland and Cuyahoga County to the suburban areas of Lake County. It begins at the east end of the Cleveland Memorial Shoreway and passes through the municipalities of Euclid, where I-90 diverges from SR 2; Wickliffe; Willowick; Willoughby; Eastlake; Mentor; Painesville; and Painesville Township. The freeway was extensively rebuilt in Lake County west of SR 44 between 2006 and 2012, which included the extension of one lane in each direction between SR 640 and SR 44. The Lake County section of freeway was authorized by Lake County Commissioners in 1957, and constructed and opened to traffic in the early 1960s. It was blended into the Cleveland Memorial Shoreway at the western end in Cuyahoga County, roughly as planned in 1944; because of that, the "Shoreway" name is often applied to the Lakeland Freeway from its west end to the I-90/SR 2 interchange.

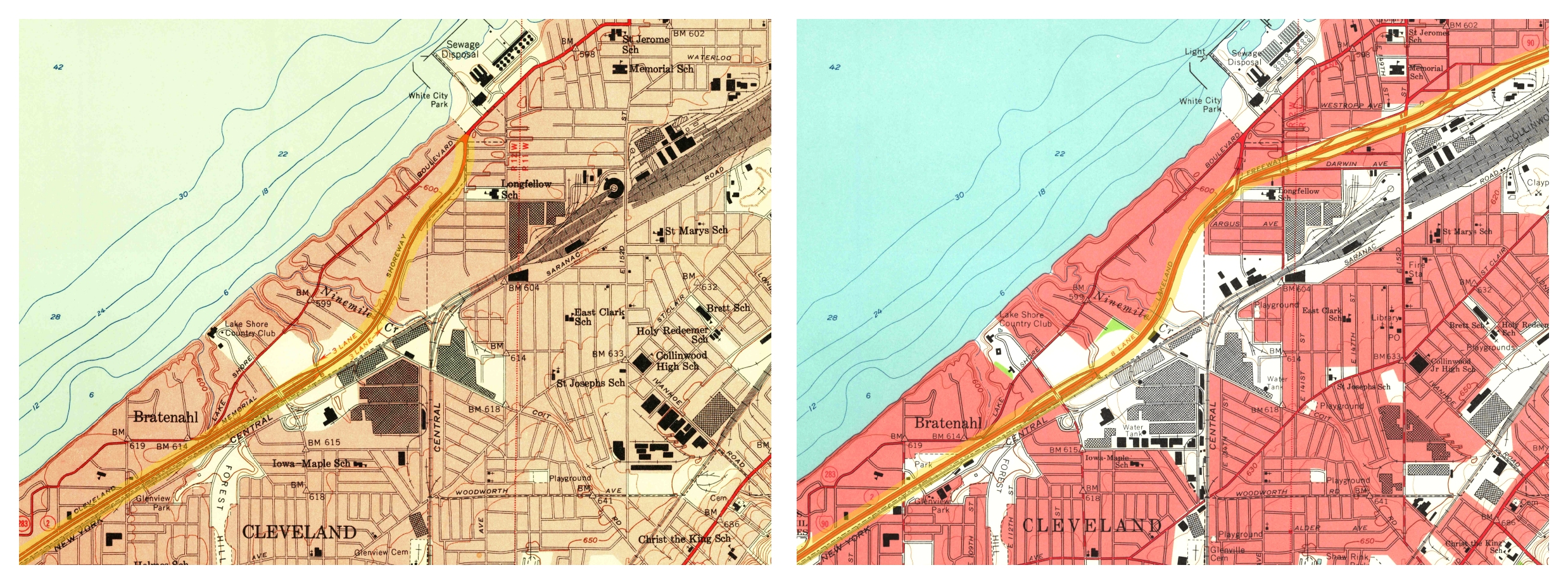
Cleveland Memorial Shoreway and the Lakeland Freeway: At left is the USGS topographic map showing the eastern terminus of the Cleveland Memorial Shoreway in 1953. At right is the same map area in 1963 showing the Cleveland Memorial Shoreway merging with the newly constructed Lakeland Freeway.

=== Honorary names ===
- The section of SR 2 that runs through Erie County is called the "Jackie Mayer Miss America Highway" and is named for Jackie Mayer, a former Miss America who was raised in Sandusky.
- The Cleveland Memorial Shoreway West is named the "Governor Richard F. Celeste Highway" for former governor Dick Celeste.
- The section of SR 2 that runs through Willoughby is named "Brian Montgomery Memorial Highway" in honor of a Marine lance corporal who was killed in the Iraq War in August 2005.

== History ==
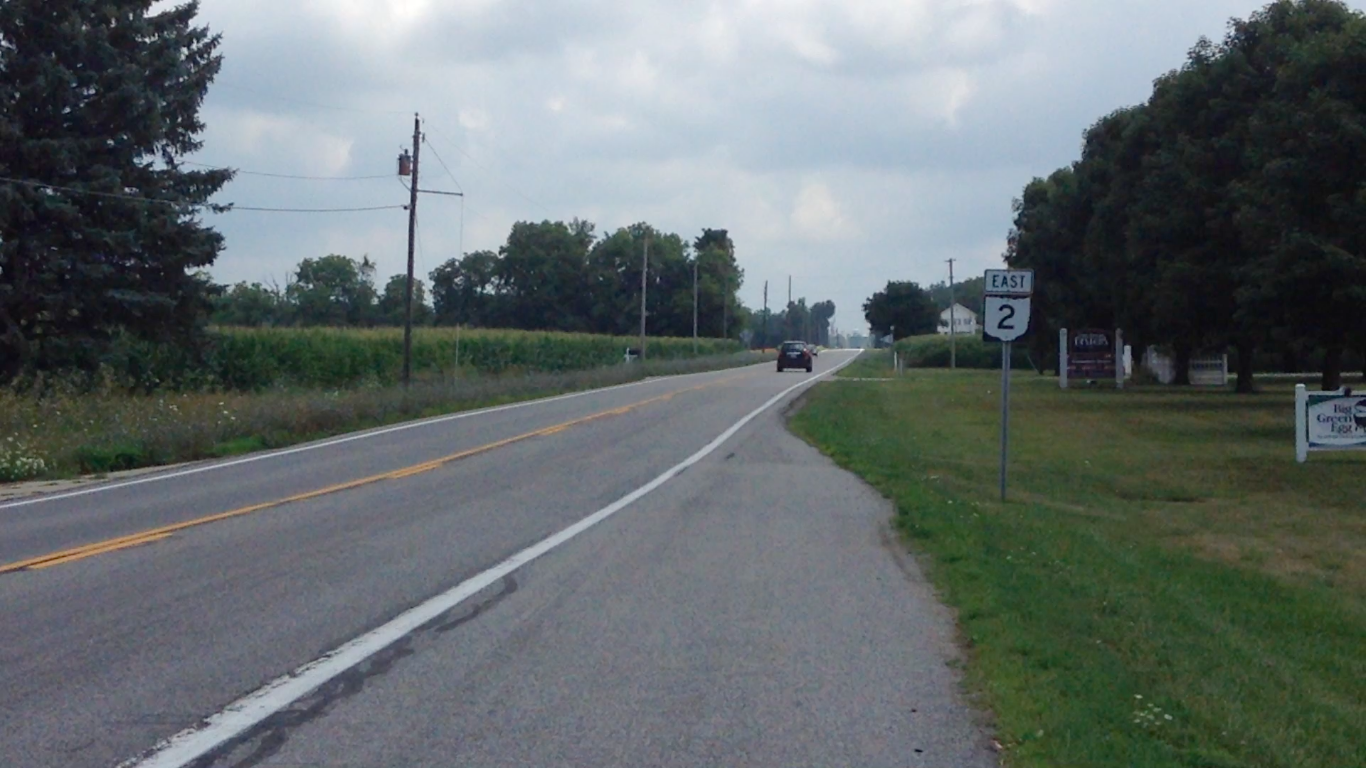
Western terminus of SR 2

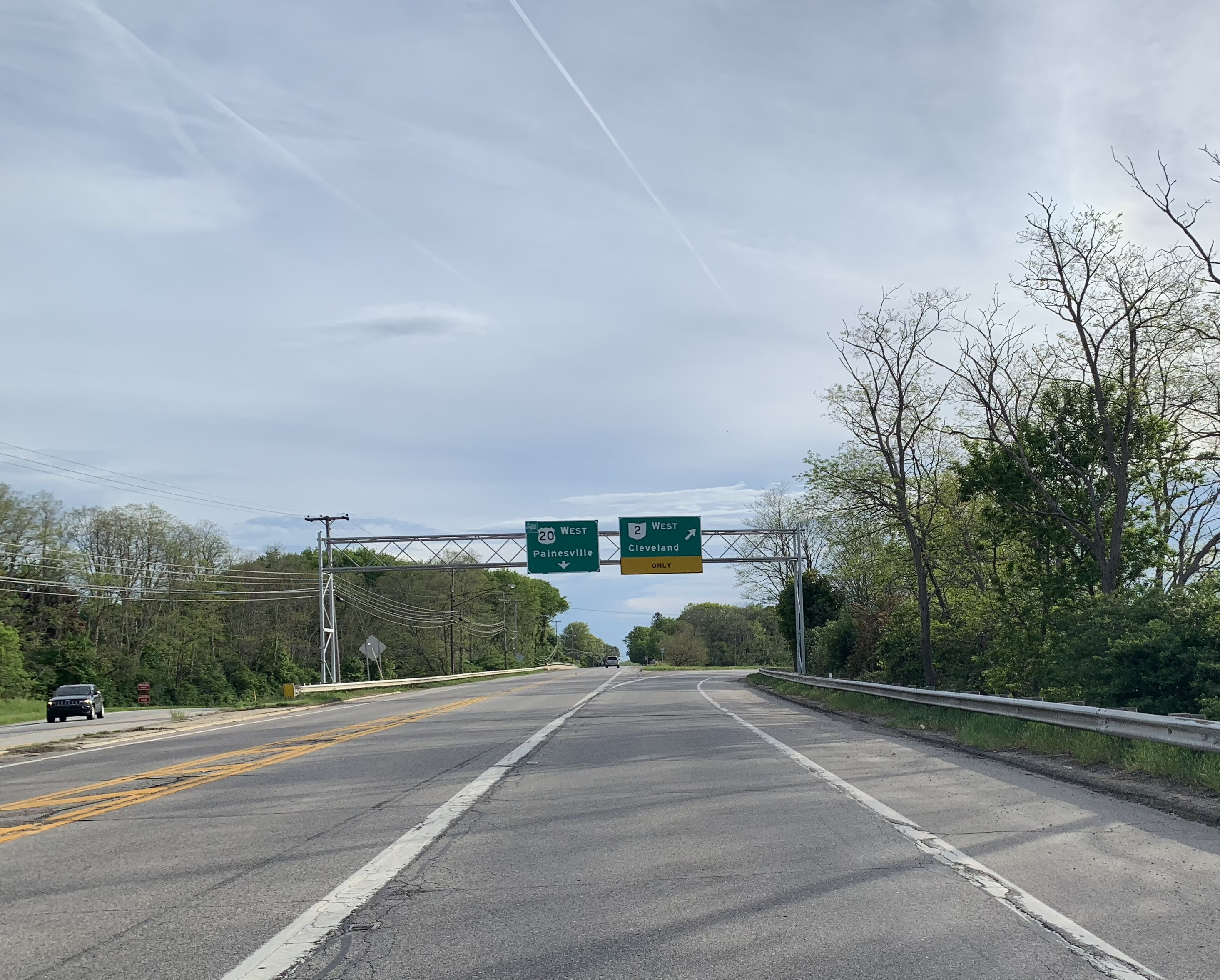
Eastern terminus of SR 2

Established in 1912 as Intercounty Highway 2, the route initially connected Cleveland to the Pennsylvania state line.

By 1923, it extended westward, aligning with what is now US 6 from the Indiana border to Bryan, and following current SR 51 and US 20 from Toledo to Pennsylvania.

Between 1926 and 1927, SR 2 was rerouted from Toledo to Cleveland, utilizing the former SR 23 alignment to Port Clinton, an unnumbered stretch to two miles (3.2 km) west of Sandusky, and the previous SR 12 into Cleveland. Concurrently, the segment from Cleveland to Pennsylvania was designated as US 20.

In 1931, the route extended east to Willoughby via St. Clair Avenue. However, by 1932, its western terminus was shortened to Bryan, with the segment from Bryan to the Indiana state line reclassified as US 6.

In 1936, the route was extended to the Indiana state line via the former SR 108 alignment from Hicksville to Bryan, and the former SR 18 alignment from the Indiana state line to Hicksville, with which it was dually certified along this route until 1940.

In 1939 SR 18 alignment was removed from SR 2 alignment west of Hicksville. Additionally, the route extended east to Lost Nation Road in Willoughby. Two years later, in 1941 SR 2 from West 6th to East 9th moved from Lakeside Avenue to the Lakefront Highway, later called the Cleveland Memorial Shoreway. Lakeside certified as SR 2 temporarily.

In 1962 the route was extended east to SR 283 in Painesville; Euclid-to-Painesville alignment upgraded to freeway.

In 1967 the portion of the route from nine miles (14 km) west of Sandusky to four miles (6.4 km) west of Sandusky was upgraded to freeway, and rerouted on the bypass around Sandusky on former US 6 alignment. Additionally, the route was extended to its current eastern terminus at US 20 in Painesville Township. A year later in 1968, the portion of the route from SR 163 to nine miles (14 km) west of Sandusky upgraded to freeway.

In 1970 the portion of the route from two miles (3.2 km) west of Amherst to SR 83 (SR 76 at that time) upgraded to freeway; from 4 miles (6.4 km) east of Amherst to SR 83 dually certified with I-90.

From 1973 to 1975, SR 2 Alt. was deleted as discontinuous sections of SR 2 are moved from US 6 to I-90.

In 1976, the portion of the route from Ceylon to two miles (3.2 km) west of Amherst upgraded to freeway. And in 1977, the portion from SR 83 to Rocky River was upgraded to freeway and dually certified with I-90.

On August 30, 1990, the portion from Huron to Ceylon was upgraded to freeway.

== Future ==
As of 2025 a project is underway to convert the East Shoreway west of I-90 into an at-grade boulevard, including relocating the east landing of the Main Avenue Bridge southward to a T-intersection at West Third Street. The project is related to North Coast Harbor redevelopment.

== Cultural references ==
In the 2014 film Captain America: The Winter Soldier, the Cleveland Memorial Shoreway is used to depict a freeway in Washington, D.C.

== Gallery ==
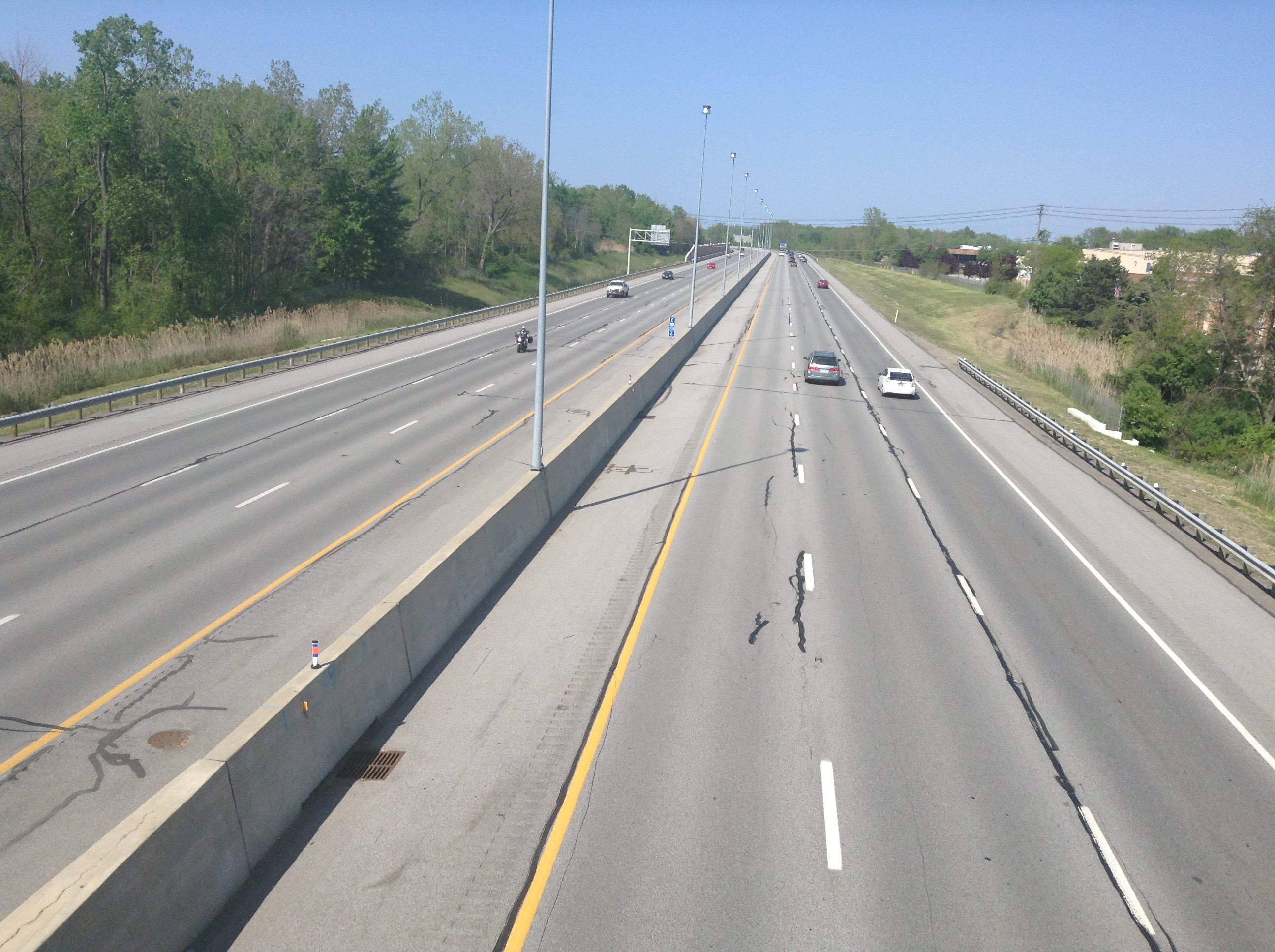
Lakeland Freeway in Mentor

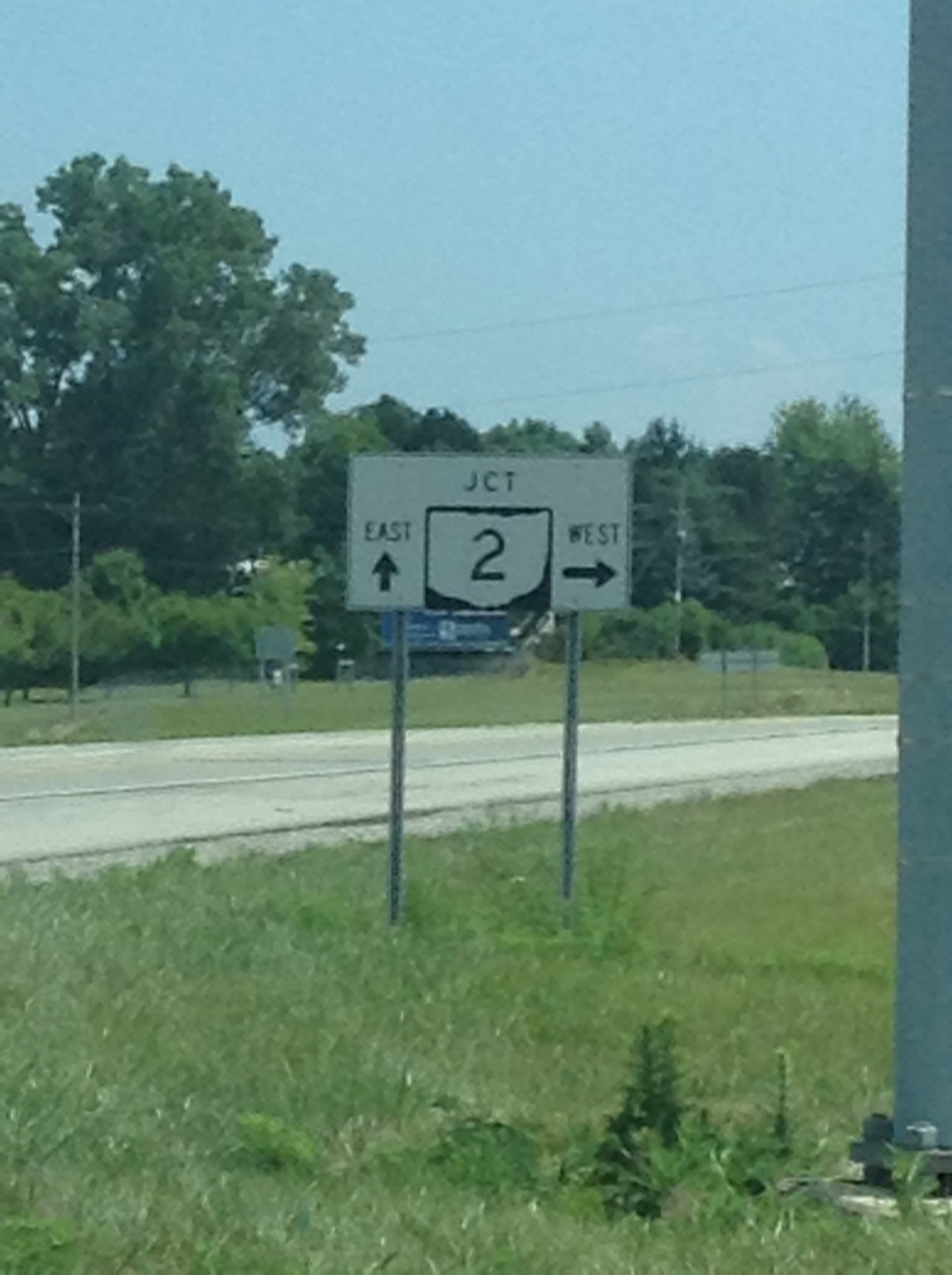
Wide variant of State Route 2 signage at US 6 in Bryan

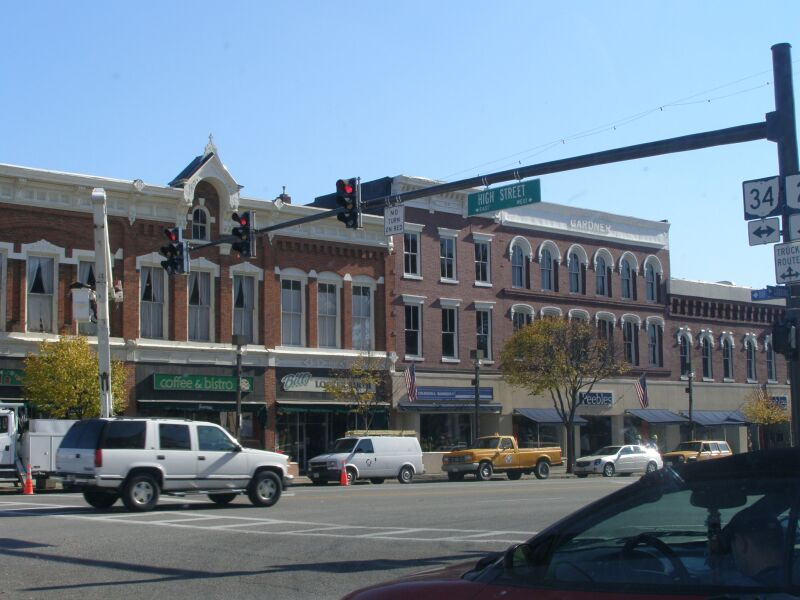
SR 2 in Bryan

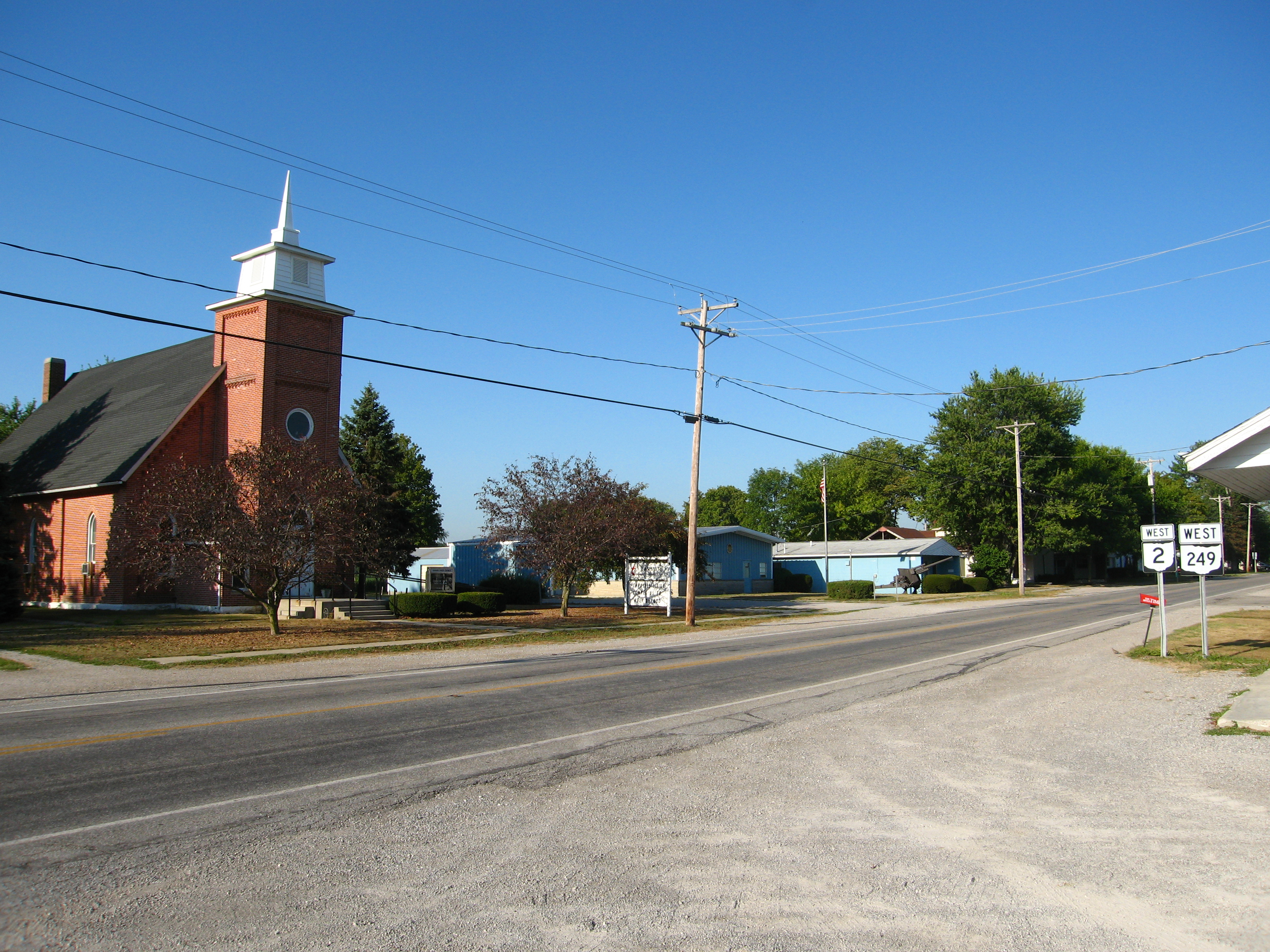
SR 2 in Farmer

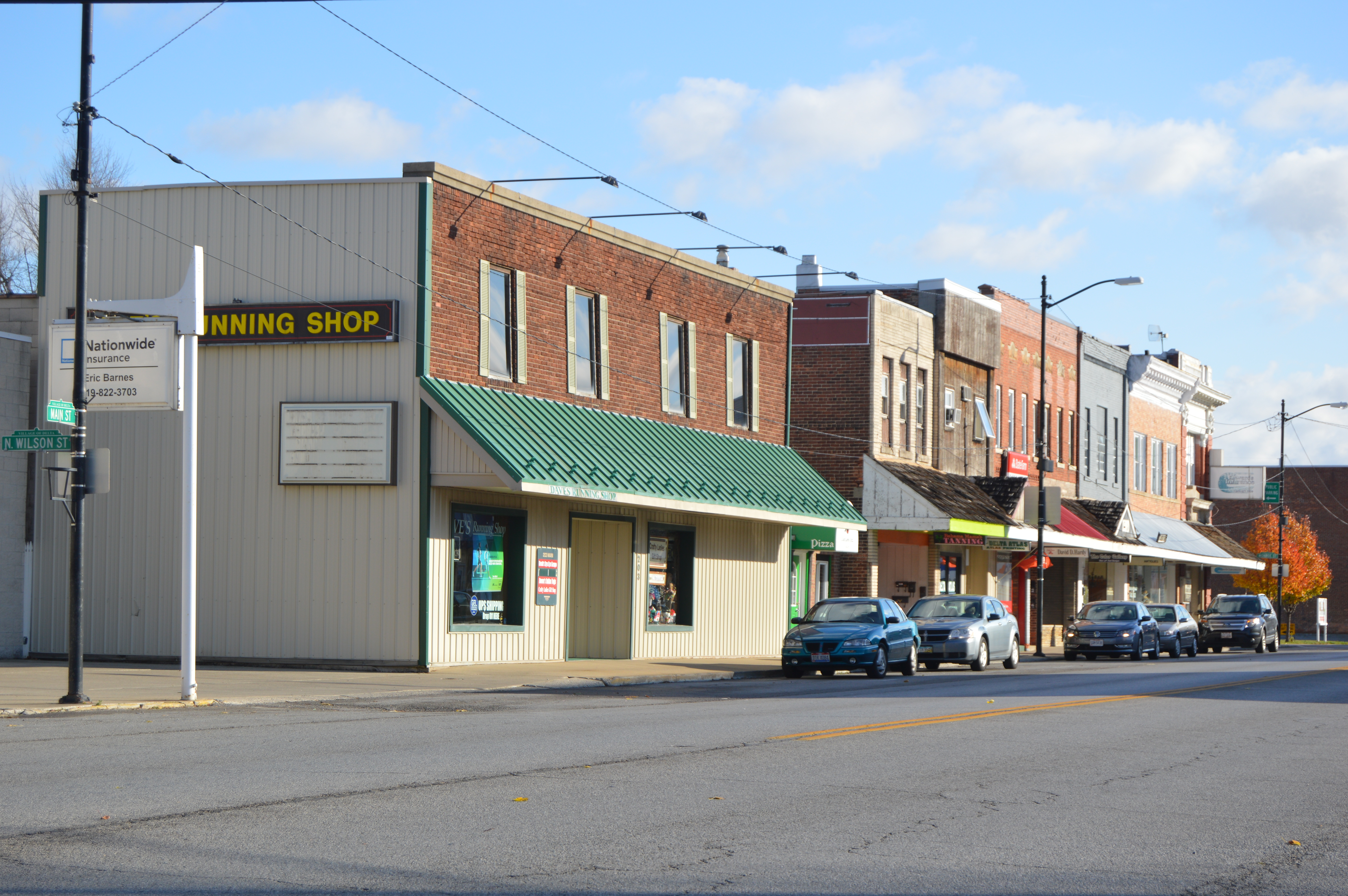
US 20A / SR 2 in Delta

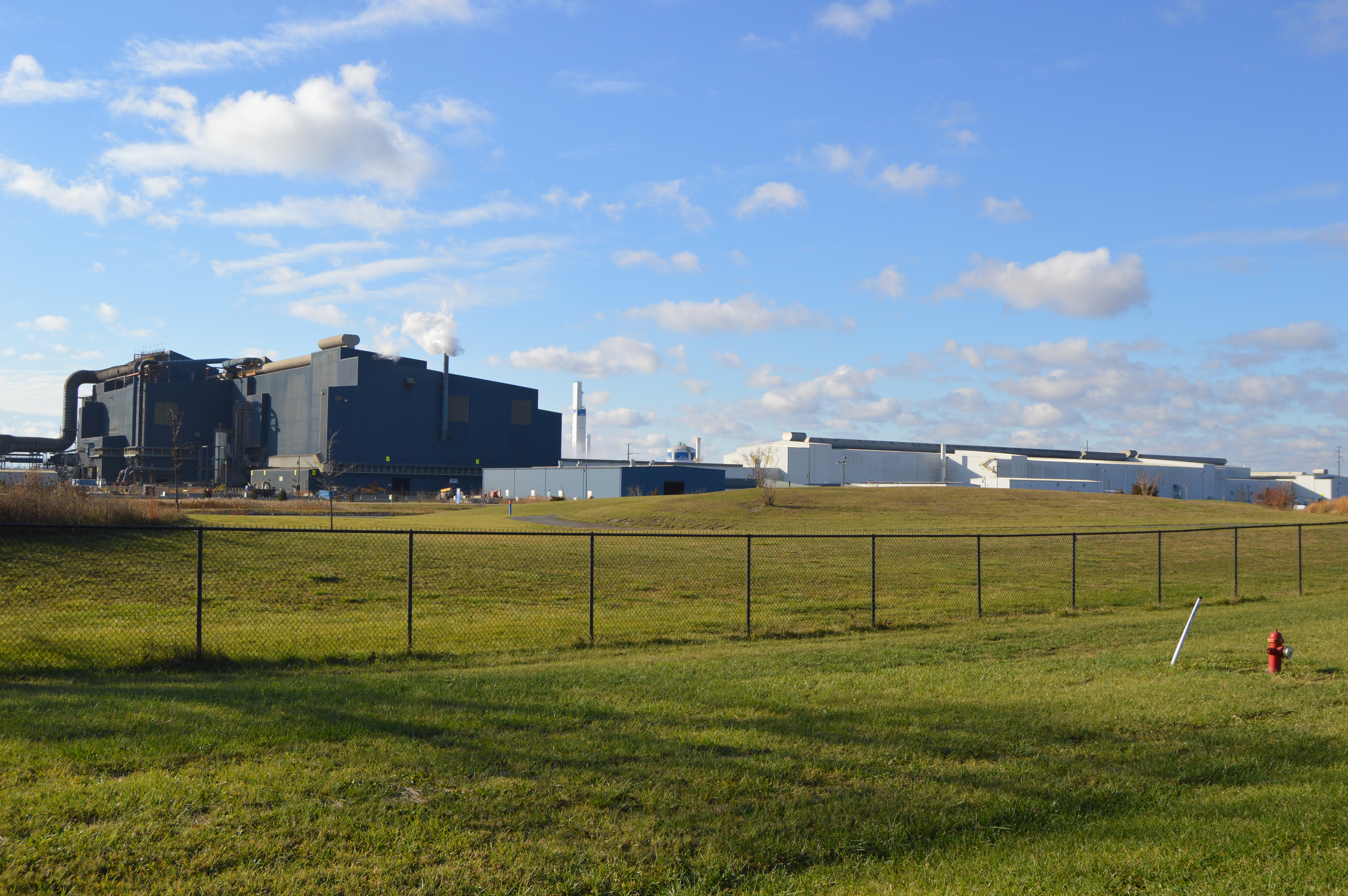
US 20A / SR 2 along the North Star BlueScope Steel mill located southwest of Delta

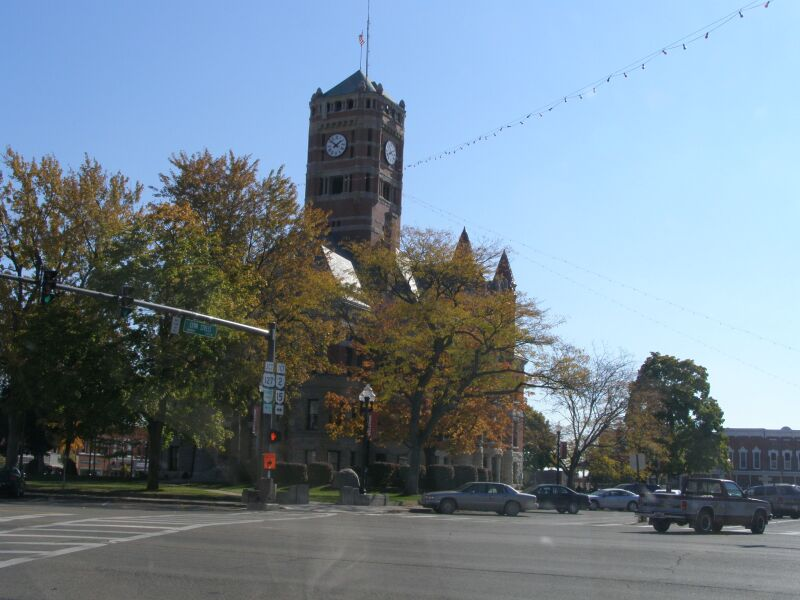
US 127 / SR 2 / SR 15 in Bryan

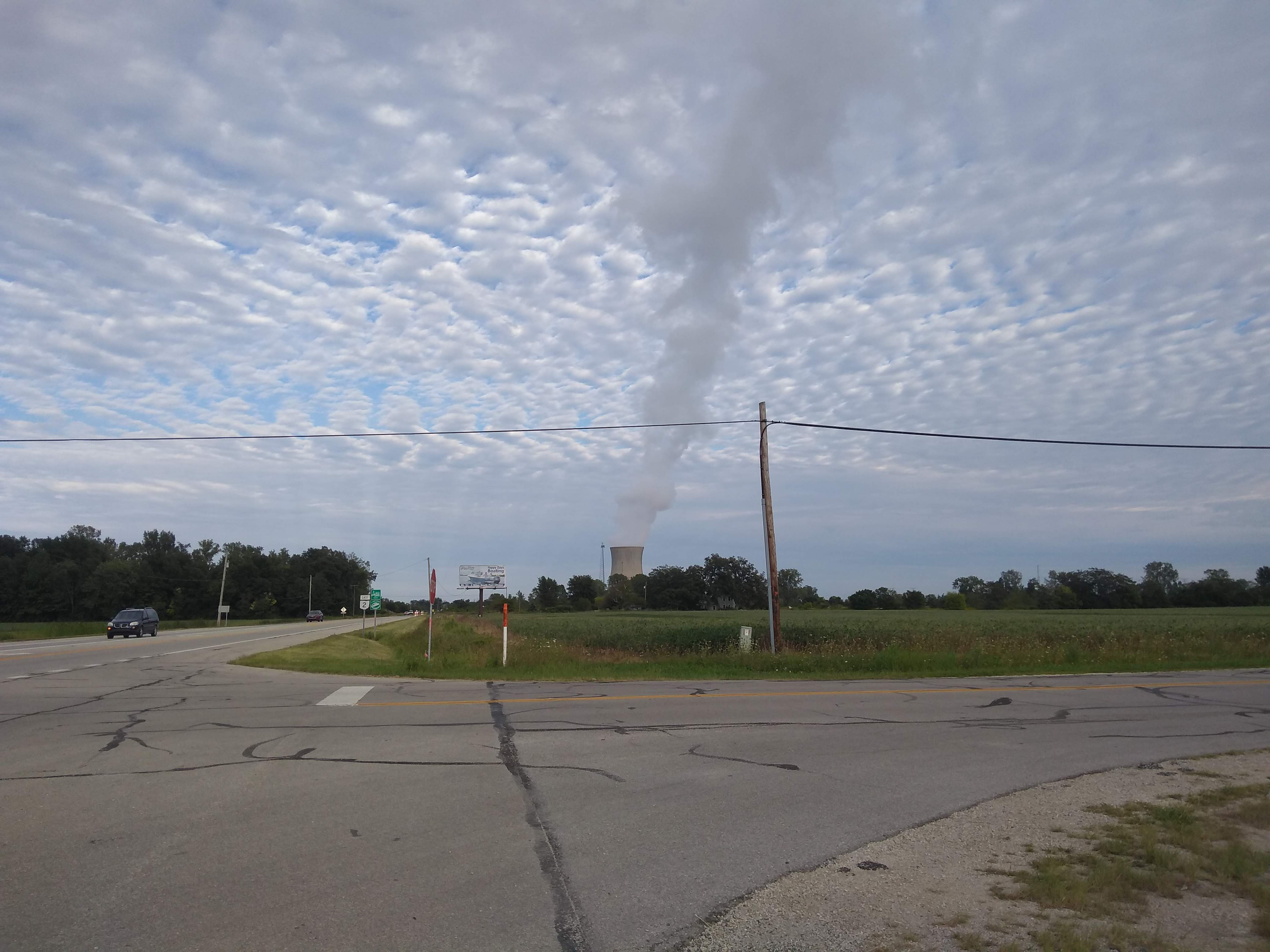
Davis–Besse Nuclear Power Station viewed from Ohio State Route 2

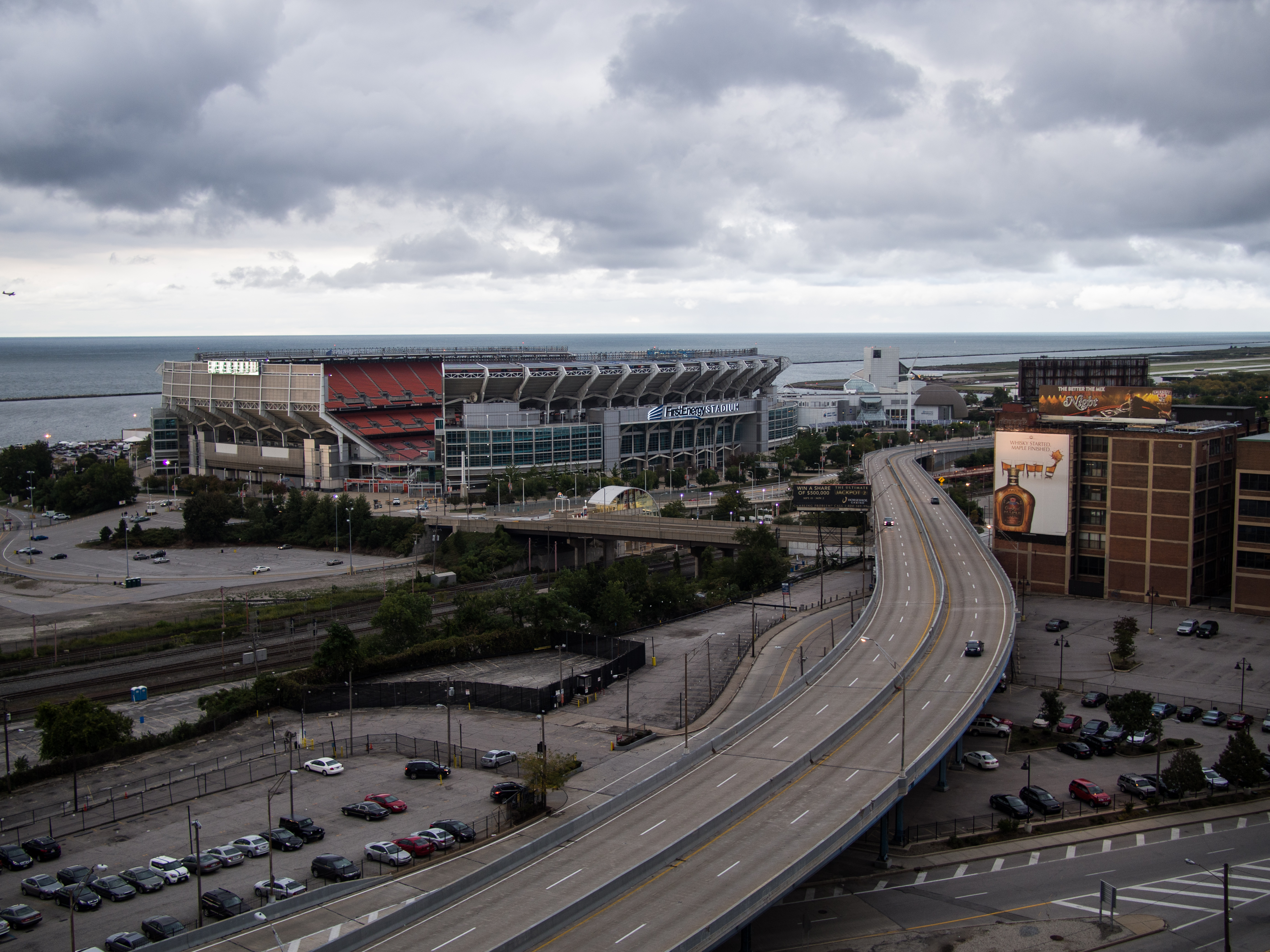
Cleveland Memorial Shoreway in 2013

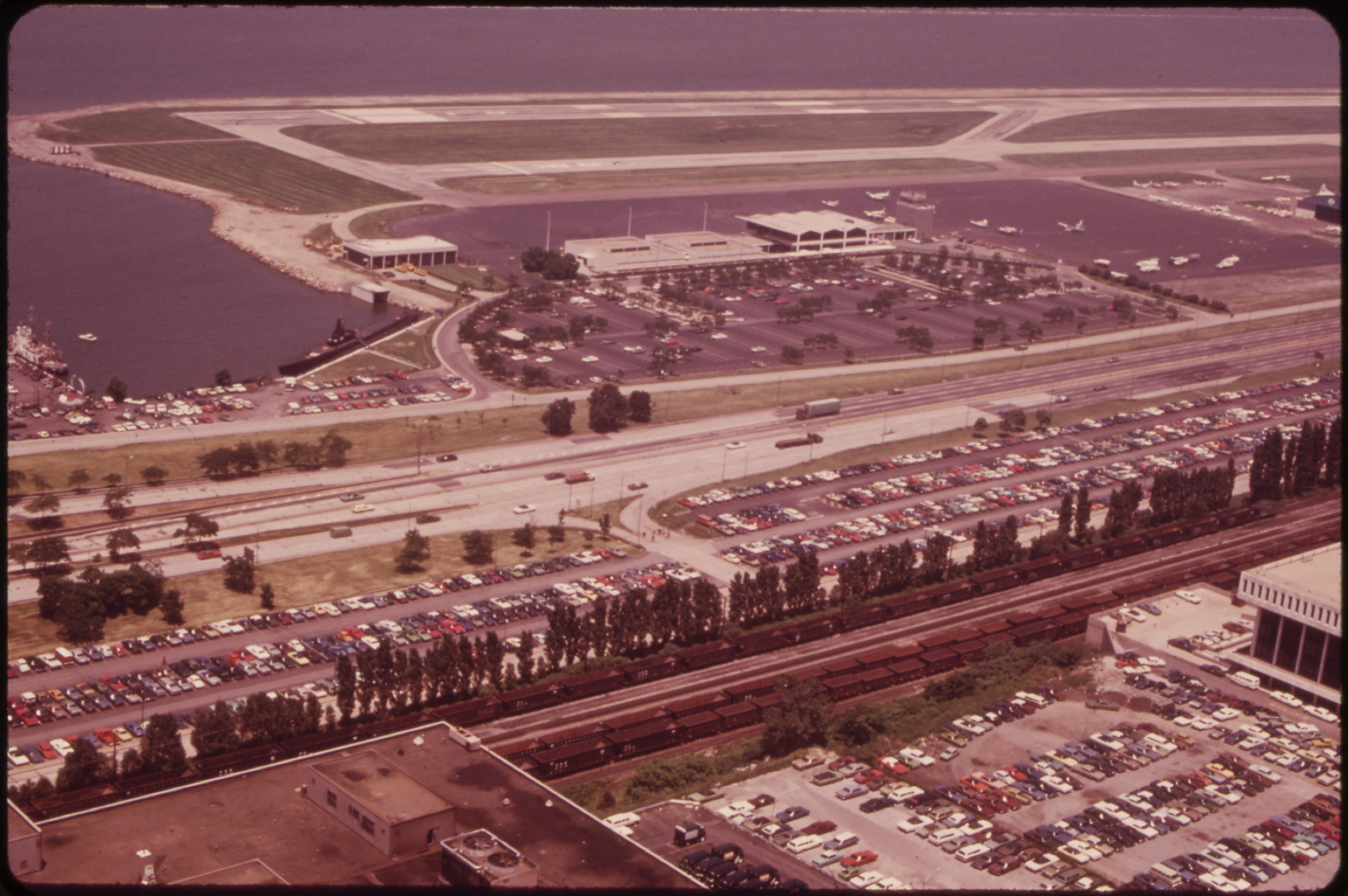
Cleveland Memorial Shoreway in 1973

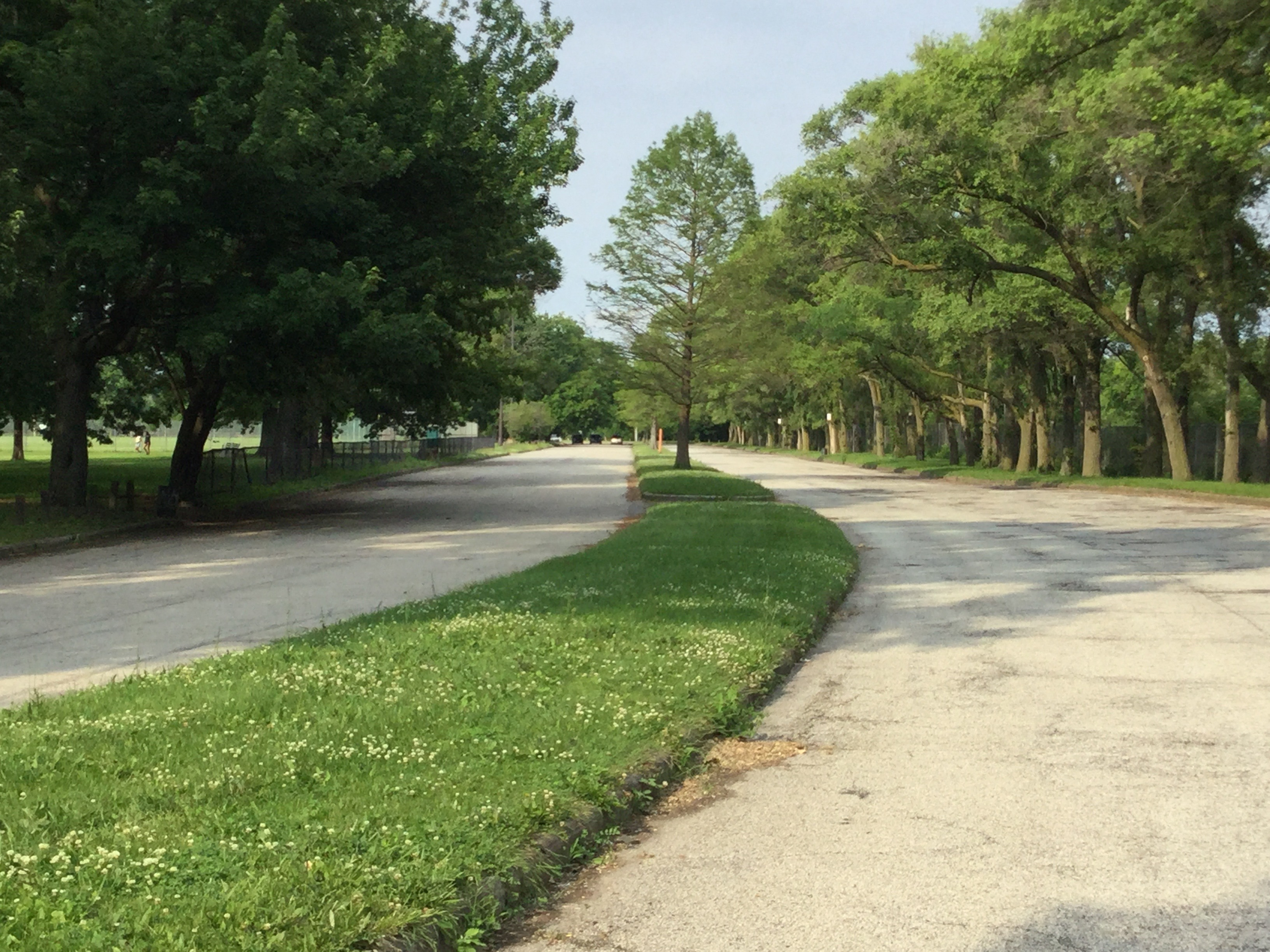
Abandoned stretch of SR 2 in Gordon Park

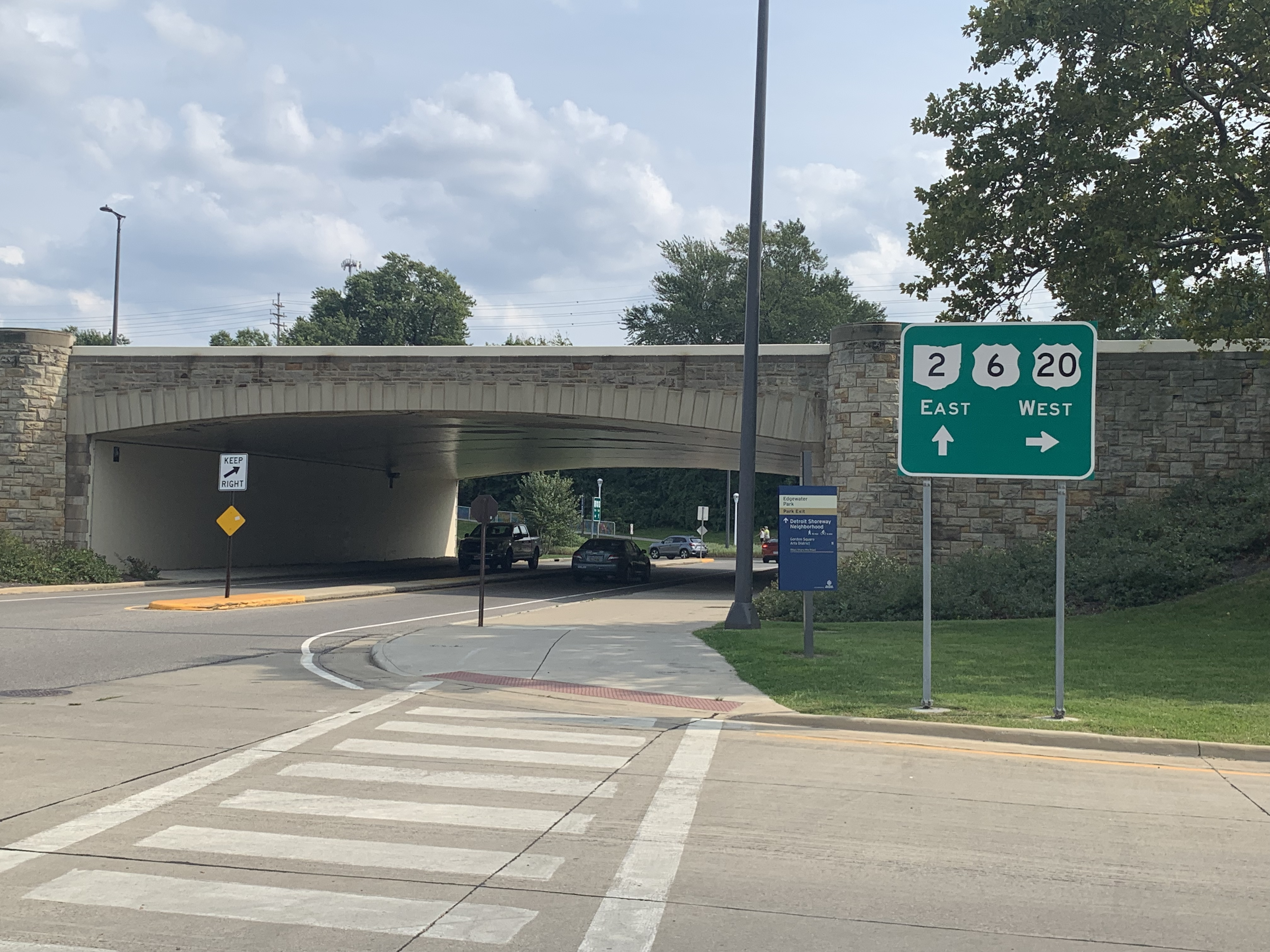
Edgewater Park overpass in Cleveland

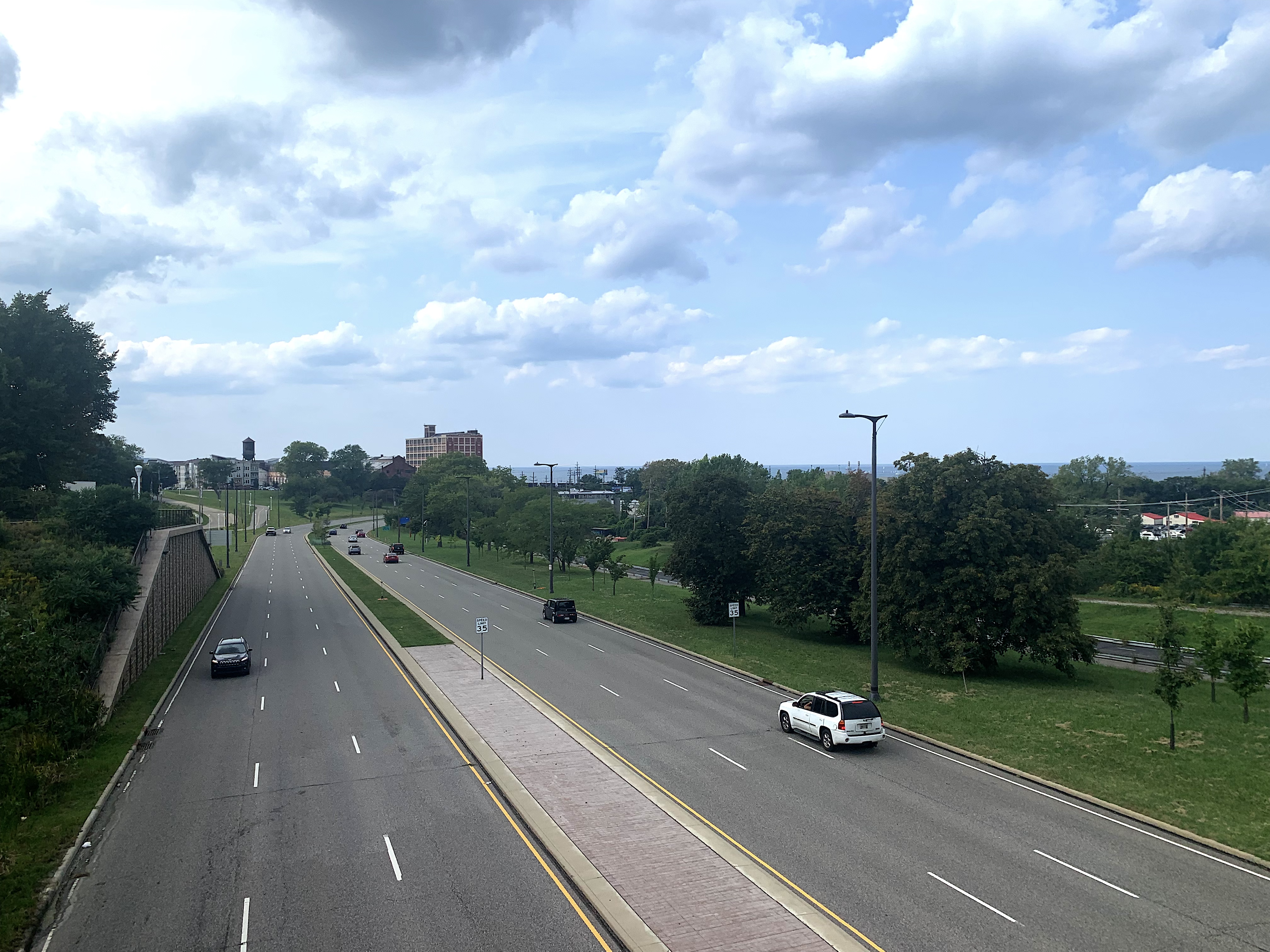
West Shoreway in 2022

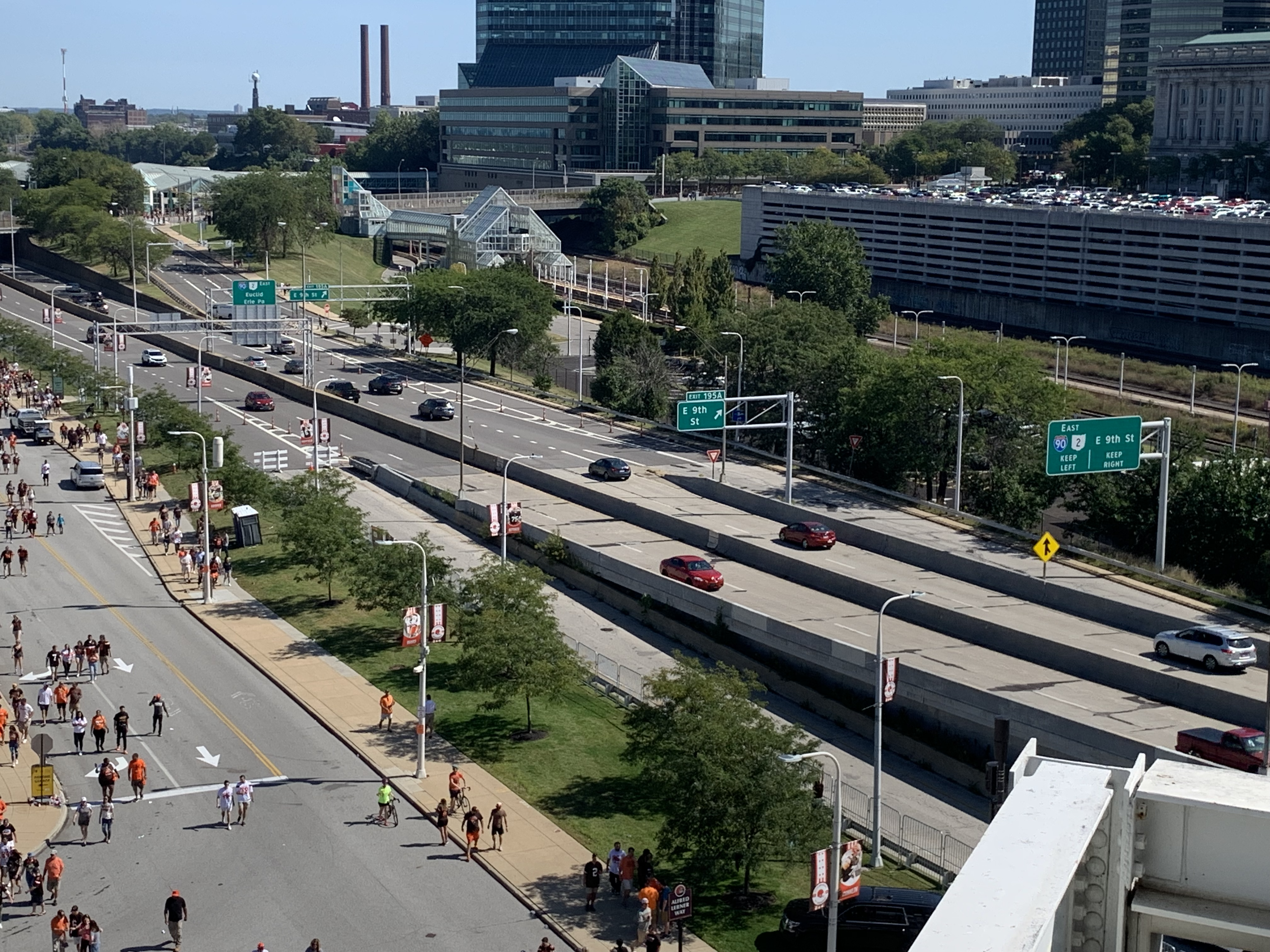
East Shoreway from Huntington Bank Field

== Major intersections ==
County	Location	mi	km	Old exit	New exit	Destinations	Notes
Defiance	Hicksville Township	0.00	0.00			SR 37 south / Ohio Indiana State Line Road – Fort Wayne	Continuation into Indiana
Defiance	Hicksville	2.34	3.77			SR 49 south (Antwerp Drive) / Spencerville Street – Antwerp	Southern end of SR 49 concurrency
Defiance	Hicksville	2.65	4.26			SR 18 west (Main Street)	Southern end of SR 18 concurrency
Defiance	Hicksville	3.06	4.92			SR 18 east (Defiance Avenue)	Northern end of SR 18 concurrency
Defiance	Hicksville	3.71	5.97			SR 49 north – Edgerton	Northern end of SR 49 concurrency
Defiance	Farmer Township	11.16	17.96			SR 249 west / Ridenour Road	Western end of SR 249 concurrency
Defiance	Farmer Township	13.17	21.20			SR 249 east / Farmer Mark Road – Ney	Eastern end of SR 249 concurrency
Williams	Center Township	16.54	26.62			SR 576 north	Southern terminus of SR 576
Williams	Center Township	17.79	28.63			US 6 west / CR 12C – Edgerton	Western end of US 6 concurrency
Williams	Pulaski Township	20.23	32.56			US 6 east – Napoleon US 127 south / SR 15 south – Sherwood	Eastern end of US 6 concurrency; southern end of US 127/SR 15 concurrency
Williams	Bryan	22.50	36.21			US 127 north / SR 15 north (North Main Street) SR 34 west (West High Street)	Northern end of US 127/SR 15 concurrency; western end of SR 34 concurrency
Williams	Springfield Township	29.78	47.93			SR 34 east – Napoleon SR 191 south	Eastern end of SR 34 concurrency; southern end of SR 191 concurrency
Williams	Stryker	31.66	50.95			SR 191 north (Lynn Street)	Northern end of SR 191 concurrency
Fulton	Archbold	38.02	61.19			SR 66 south (Defiance Street)	Southern end of SR 66 concurrency
Fulton	German Township	39.52	63.60			SR 66 north / Township Road E – Fayette	Northern end of SR 66 concurrency
Fulton	Wauseon	48.30	77.73			SR 2D east (Fulton Street)	Western terminus of SR 2D; eastbound unsigned
Fulton	Wauseon	48.67	78.33			SR 108 south (North Shoop Avenue) / East Elm Street	Southern end of SR 108 concurrency
Fulton	Wauseon	49.27	79.29			SR 2D west (East Linfoot Street)	Eastern terminus of SR 2D; signed as SR 2 westbound
Fulton	Wauseon	50.27	80.90			US 20A west / SR 108 north to Ohio Turnpike / CR 14 – West Unity, Ottokee, Fulton County Airport	Northern end of SR 108 concurrency; western end of US 20A concurrency
Fulton	York Township	55.30	89.00			SR 109 north to Ohio Turnpike – Adrian	Western end of SR 109 concurrency
Fulton	Delta	57.06	91.83			SR 109 south (Madison Street)	Eastern end of SR 109 concurrency
Fulton	Swanton	63.42	102.06			SR 64 north (South Main Street) / CR 1-1	Western end of SR 64 concurrency
Lucas	Swanton Township	63.96	102.93			SR 64 south (Waterville–Swanton Road) – Neapolis, Whitehouse	Eastern end of SR 64 concurrency
Lucas	Swanton Township	65.71	105.75			US 20A east / SR 295 south (Wilkins Road) – Maumee, Whitehouse, Oak Openings Preserve Metropark	Eastern end of US 20A concurrency; western end of SR 295 concurrency
Lucas	Swanton Township	66.50	107.02			SR 295 north (Berkey–Southern Road) – Berkey	Eastern end of SR 295 concurrency
Lucas	Monclova Township	67.41	108.49			I-80 / I-90 / Ohio Turnpike / Toledo Express Airport Main Terminal – Toledo, Chicago	Exit 52 on I-80/I-90/Ohio Tpk.
Lucas	Springfield Township	73.60– 73.93	118.45– 118.98			I-475 / US 23 to I-80 / I-90 – Maumee, Ann Arbor	Exit 8 on I-475/US 23
Lucas	Toledo	75.37	121.30			US 20 (Reynolds Road)	
Lucas	Toledo	79.21	127.48			US 24 (Detroit Avenue / Fearing Boulevard)	Former US 25
Lucas	Toledo	80.76	129.97			SR 25 (Anthony Wayne Trail) to I-75	Former US 24
Lucas	Toledo	82.08	132.09			SR 51 north / SR 65 north (Clayton Street) / Broadway Street	Western end of SR 51/SR 65 concurrency
Lucas	Toledo	82.08– 82.78	132.09– 133.22			Anthony Wayne Bridge over Maumee River	
Lucas	Toledo	82.88	133.38			SR 65 south (Oak Street)	Eastern end of SR 65 concurrency
Lucas	Toledo	83.33	134.11			SR 51 south (Woodville Road) / Navarre Avenue	Eastern end of SR 51 concurrency
Lucas	Oregon	84.69– 84.76	136.30– 136.41			I-280 / LECT north / Dearborn Avenue / Munding Drive	Western end of LECT concurrency; exit 7 on I-280
Ottawa	Benton Township	99.12	159.52			SR 579 west (Williston Road) – Williston	Eastern terminus of SR 579
Ottawa	Benton Township	100.88	162.35			SR 590 south – Rocky Ridge	Northern terminus of SR 590
Ottawa	Carroll Township	104.84	168.72			SR 19 south – Oak Harbor	Northern terminus of SR 19
Ottawa	Erie Township	111.05	178.72			SR 358 south / Camp Perry	Northern terminus of SR 358
Ottawa	Erie Township	114.23	183.84	Rest Area (at grade intersection)			
Ottawa	Erie Township	114.82	184.78	Western end of freeway section			
Ottawa	Erie Township	115.66	186.14		115	SR 163 – Oak Harbor, Genoa	Eastbound entrance and westbound exit
Ottawa	Bay Township	117.07– 117.59	188.41– 189.24		117	SR 53 south (West Fremont Road) to I-80 / I-90 – Fremont	Western end of SR 53 concurrency
Ottawa	Portage Township	120.96– 121.62	194.67– 195.73		121	SR 163 – Port Clinton, Catawba Island	Double trumpet interchange; signed as 121A (west) and 121B (east); via unsigned SR 2C
Ottawa	Portage Township	123.38– 123.90	198.56– 199.40		124	SR 53 north – Catawba Island	Eastern end of SR 53 concurrency
Ottawa	Danbury Township	124.25– 124.88	199.96– 200.97		125A	SR 269 north – Lakeside, Marblehead	Northern end of SR 269 concurrency
Ottawa	Danbury Township	124.25– 124.88	199.96– 200.97		125B	Bay Shore Road	Access to Bay Shore Road from SR 269
Ottawa	Sandusky Bay	126.05– 126.51	202.86– 203.60	Thomas A. Edison Memorial Bridge			
Erie	Margaretta Township	127.82– 128.52	205.71– 206.83		128	SR 269 south / Martins Point Road – Castalia, Bay View	Southern end of SR 269 concurrency
Erie	Sandusky	130.29– 130.99	209.68– 210.81		131	US 6 / LECT east – Sandusky, Fremont	Eastern terminus of LECT concurrency
Erie	Margaretta Township	132.18– 132.91	212.72– 213.90		133	SR 101 – Castalia, Sandusky	Eastern terminus of SR 101
Erie	Perkins Township	134.07– 134.85	215.76– 217.02		134	SR 4 to Ohio Turnpike – Bucyrus, Sandusky	
Erie	Perkins Township	137.87– 138.72	221.88– 223.25		138	US 250 – Norwalk, Sandusky	
Erie	Huron	141.41– 142.12	227.58– 228.72		142	US 6 / LECT west (Rye Beach Road)	Western end of US 6 concurrency
Erie	Huron	142.28– 142.34	228.98– 229.07		143	US 6 / LECT east – Huron	Eastern end of US 6 concurrency; eastbound exit and westbound entrance
Erie	Huron Township	144.37– 144.97	232.34– 233.31		145	SR 13 – Huron, Norwalk	
Erie	Berlin Township	146.72– 147.53	236.12– 237.43		147	Berlin Road	
Erie	Berlin Township	148.16– 148.90	238.44– 239.63		148	SR 61 – Berlin Heights	
Erie	Vermilion Township	155.52– 156.21	250.29– 251.40		156	SR 60 – Wakeman, Vermillion	
Lorain	Brownhelm Township	157.17– 157.69	252.94– 253.78	Lorain Service Plaza / Rest Area			
Lorain	Vermillion	158.24– 158.55	254.66– 255.16		158	Vermilion Road / Sunnyside Road	Exit numbered only on eastbound side
Lorain	Vermillion	160.05– 160.40	257.58– 258.14		160	To Ohio Turnpike Baumhart Road	Exit numbered only on westbound side
Lorain	Amherst	162.54– 162.93	261.58– 262.21		163	North Lake Street / Oak Point Road	
Lorain	Amherst	164.11– 164.52	264.11– 264.77		164	SR 58 – Amherst, Lorain	
Lorain	Lorain	166.37– 166.75	267.75– 268.36	10	166	Middle Ridge Road / Broadway	
Lorain	Elyria Township	168.02	270.40		—	I-90 west (Ohio Turnpike Connector) to I-80 / Ohio Turnpike west – Toledo	Western end of I-90 concurrency; westbound exit and eastbound entrance; I-90 exit 144
Lorain	Elyria	169.03– 169.61	272.03– 272.96		145	SR 57 to I-80 / Ohio Turnpike – Elyria, Lorain	Exit numbers follow I-90 east of the turnpike
Lorain	Sheffield	171.49– 171.89	275.99– 276.63		148	SR 254 – Sheffield, Avon	
Lorain	Avon	174.71– 175.10	281.17– 281.80		151	SR 611 – Avon, Sheffield	
Lorain	Avon	176.41– 176.75	283.90– 284.45		153	SR 83 – Avon, Avon Lake	
Lorain	Avon	179.09– 179.56	288.22– 288.97		155	Nagel Road – Avon Lake, North Ridgeville, Avon	
Cuyahoga	Westlake	180.02– 180.64	289.71– 290.71		156	Crocker Road / Bassett Road – Bay Village, Westlake, North Olmsted	
Cuyahoga	Westlake	182.68– 183.28	293.99– 294.96		159	SR 252 (Columbia Road)	
Cuyahoga	Westlake	183.92– 184.23	295.99– 296.49		160	Clague Road	Westbound exit, eastbound entrance
Cuyahoga	Rocky River	185.16– 185.43	297.99– 298.42			I-90 east (Northwest Freeway) / SR 254 west (Detroit Road) – Cleveland	Eastern end of I-90 concurrency; western end of SR 254 concurrency; no access to I-90 eastbound from SR 2 westbound; I-90 exit 161
Cuyahoga	Rocky River	185.16– 185.43	297.99– 298.42	Eastern end of freeway section			
Cuyahoga	Rocky River	186.50	300.14			SR 254 east (Detroit Road)	Eastern end of SR 254 concurrency; SR 254 continues along SR 2 unsigned while SR 254-D (signed as SR 254) continues along Detroit Road
Cuyahoga	Rocky River	186.82	300.66		—	US 6 west (Lake Road) / LECT	Interchange; western end of US 6 and LECT concurrency; westbound left exit and eastbound left entrance
Cuyahoga	Lakewood	187.68	302.04			US 20 west / SR 113 west / SR 237 south (West Clifton Boulevard) / SR 254 ends	Western end of US 20 concurrency; eastern terminus of SR 113; northern terminus of SR 237; unsigned eastern terminus of SR 254
Cuyahoga	Cleveland	191.83– 191.98	308.72– 308.96	191	—	Lake Avenue / West Boulevard	Westbound exit and eastbound entrance; exit numbered during mid 2010s
Cuyahoga	Cleveland	192.36– 192.69	309.57– 310.10	192	—	West 73rd Street	Access to West 73rd Street opened December 12, 2015; exit formerly known as Edgewater Park, Whiskey Island; exit numbered during mid 2010s
Cuyahoga	Cleveland	193.30– 193.38	311.09– 311.21	193A	—	West 45th Street	Eastbound exit and entrance; exit numbered during mid 2010s
Cuyahoga	Cleveland	193.28– 193.40	311.05– 311.25		193	West 49th Street	Westbound exit and entrance; exit numbered only on westbound side
Cuyahoga	Cleveland	193.73	311.78	Western end of freeway			
Cuyahoga	Cleveland	193.73	311.78		193B	US 6 east / US 20 east to US 6 Alt. / US 42 / SR 3 (West 25th Street)	Eastern end of US 6/US 20 concurrency; eastbound exit and westbound entrance; eastbound entrance in planning stages
Cuyahoga	Cleveland	194.01	312.23		194	West 28th Street – Flats West	Westbound exit and eastbound entrance; entrance to be closed to reroute entrance traffic via 45th.
Cuyahoga	Cleveland	194.19– 194.65	312.52– 313.26	Main Avenue Bridge over the Cuyahoga River			
Cuyahoga	Cleveland	194.65	313.26		194	Lakeside Avenue / West 6th Street	Eastbound exit and westbound entrance
Cuyahoga	Cleveland	195.14– 195.18	314.05– 314.11		195B	West 3rd Street	Westbound exit and eastbound entrance
Cuyahoga	Cleveland	195.17– 195.51	314.10– 314.64		195A	East 9th Street – Rock and Roll Hall of Fame	
Cuyahoga	Cleveland	195.51	314.64			City of Cleveland Parking	Eastbound entrance; former exit removed after 1979
Cuyahoga	Cleveland	195.65– 195.79	314.87– 315.09		195B	City of Cleveland Parking	Eastbound exit and entrance, first exit
Cuyahoga	Cleveland	196.05– 196.08	315.51– 315.56		195A	City of Cleveland Parking – Amtrak Station	Eastbound exit and entrance, second exit; erroneous exit number (196A)
Cuyahoga	Cleveland	196.24	315.82		196B	I-90 west to I-71 / I-77 south – Toledo, Columbus	Eastbound exit
Cuyahoga	Cleveland	196.23– 196.34	315.80– 315.98		196	South Marginal Road	Westbound exit and entrance
Cuyahoga	Cleveland	196.61– 196.86	316.41– 316.82		—	I-90 west to I-71 / I-77 south – Toledo, Columbus	Western end of I-90 westbound concurrency; westbound exit and entrance from I-90 via exit 174B; eastbound entrance via eastbound I-90 from the Innerbelt
Cuyahoga	Cleveland	196.78	316.69		196C	South Marginal Road	Eastbound exit
Cuyahoga	Cleveland	196.86	316.82	Western end of eastbound concurrency with I-90			
Cuyahoga	Cleveland	197.78– 198.36	318.30– 319.23		175	East 55th Street / Marginal Roads	Exit numbers west of Dead Man's Curve follow I-90
Cuyahoga	Cleveland	198.76– 199.13	319.87– 320.47		176	SR 283 west (East 72nd Street)	Western end of SR 283 concurrency
Cuyahoga	Cleveland	199.16– 199.51	320.52– 321.08		177	Martin Luther King Jr. Boulevard / University Circle	
Cuyahoga	Bratenahl	200.76– 201.20	323.09– 323.80		178	Eddy Road – Bratenahl	
Cuyahoga	Bratenahl	201.97	325.04		179	SR 283 east / LECT (Lakeshore Boulevard)	Eastern end of SR 283 and LECT concurrencies; eastbound exit and westbound entrance
Cuyahoga	Cleveland	202.20– 202.82	325.41– 326.41		180	East 140th Street / East 152nd Street	Signed as exits 180A (East 140th Street) and 180B (East 152nd Street) eastbound
Cuyahoga	Cleveland	203.08– 203.21	326.83– 327.03		181	East 156th Street	Westbound entrance and exit
Cuyahoga	Cleveland	204.22– 204.95	328.66– 329.84		182A	East 185th Street	
Cuyahoga	Cleveland	204.64– 205.75	329.34– 331.12		182B	East 200th Street	
Cuyahoga	Euclid	205.14– 206.41	330.14– 332.18		183	East 222nd Street	
Cuyahoga	Euclid	206.80– 207.16	332.81– 333.39		184	SR 175 (East 260th Street) / Babbitt Road	Signed as exits 184A (Babbitt Rd.) and 184B (E. 260th) eastbound
Cuyahoga	Euclid	207.58– 208.16	334.07– 335.00		207	I-90 east to I-271 south – Erie Pa.	Left exit westbound; exit numbers follow SR 2 in Lake County; eastern end of I-90 concurrency; exit 185 on I-90 westbound
Lake	Wickliffe	208.70– 209.01	335.87– 336.37		208	Lloyd Road (SR 633) – Wickliffe	Access via Lakeland Boulevard
Lake	Willowick–Wickliffe municipal line	209.83– 210.38	337.69– 338.57		210	East 305th Street – Willowick	
Lake	Eastlake	211.30– 211.64	340.05– 340.60		211	SR 91 – Eastlake	
Lake	Willoughby	212.35– 212.48	341.74– 341.95		212	SR 640 (Vine Street) – Willoughby	
Lake	Willoughby	213.32– 214.02	343.31– 344.43		213	Lost Nation Road	
Lake	Mentor	214.94– 215.56	345.91– 346.91		215	SR 306 to US 20 – Kirtland, Mentor-on-the-Lake	
Lake	Mentor	217.68– 217.96	350.32– 350.77		217	SR 615 – Mentor	
Lake	Mentor	220.67– 221.09	355.13– 355.81		220	SR 44 north (Heisley Road) – Grand River	Western end of SR 44 concurrency
Lake	Painesville Township	221.55– 222.07	356.55– 357.39		221	SR 44 south to I-90 – Chardon	Eastern end of SR 44 concurrency
Lake	Painesville	223.20– 223.33	359.21– 359.41		223	SR 283 / LECT to SR 535 – Painesville, Fairport Harbor	
Lake	Painesville Township	225.69– 225.78	363.21– 363.36		225	SR 535 (Fairport Nursery Road)	Eastbound exit and westbound entrance
Lake	Painesville Township	227.13	365.53		227	US 20 / LECT east – Ashtabula	
1.000 mi = 1.609 km; 1.000 km = 0.621 mi: Concurrency terminus; Incomplete access; Tolled

== Auxiliary routes ==
=== SR 2 Temporary ===
State Route 2 Temporary
- Location: Cleveland
- Existed: 1941–1958

State Route 2 temporary was a designation that ran from West 6th to East 9th along Lakeside Avenue in downtown Cleveland. The designation was added when the final alignments of SR 2 were moved to the then new Lakeside Highway, later referred to as the Cleveland Memorial Shoreway. The route's eastern terminus was moved to Public Square via Ontario St. in 1957.

=== SR 2C ===
State Route 2C
- Location: Port Clinton
- Length: 0.798 mi (1,284 m)
- Existed: 1967–present

State Route 2C is an unsigned connecting road that runs from State Route 163 to State Route 2 and State Route 53 near Port Clinton in Ottawa County, Ohio. State Route 2C was constructed as an access road for the SR 2–SR 163 interchange.
