= Ohio State Route 612 =

State highway in Cuyahoga County, Ohio, US

State Route 612

- Route of SR 612 c. 1951 in red

Route information
- Maintained by ODOT
- Length: 10.1 mi (Note: This length reflects the maximum approximate length the route was designated) (16.3 km)
- Existed: 1937–1951

Major junctions
- South end: SR 82 on the North Royaltion–Strongsville line
- North end: SR 10 in Cleveland

Location
- Country: United States
- State: Ohio
- Counties: Cuyahoga

Highway system
- Ohio State Highway System; Interstate; US; State; Scenic
← SR 611	→ SR 613

State Route 612 (SR 612) was a state route located in Cuyahoga County, Ohio. The route existed from 1937 until 1951.

== Route description ==
SR 612 traveled on what is now West 130th Street in western Cuyahoga County. The route began at SR 82 on the Strongsville–North Royalton line. It continued northward, traversing along the borders of Stongsville, North Royalton, Middleburg Heights, Parma, Brook Park, and Parma Heights, before intersecting SR 17 on the border of Cleveland and Parma. The highway continued further north to SR 10 in Cleveland, where it terminated.

== History ==
SR 612 was formed in 1937, running between SR 82 and SR 17. In 1939, the northern terminus for SR 612 was extended an extra three miles (4.8 km), to a new terminus at SR 10 in Cleveland. The route was deleted from the state highway system in 1951.

== Major intersections ==
The entire route was in Cuyahoga County.

Location	mi	km	Destinations	Notes
Strongsville–North Royalton line	0.0	0.0	SR 82 (Royalton Road)	Southern terminus
Middleburg Heights–Parma Heights line	4.6	7.4	US 42 (Pearl Road)	
Cleveland–Parma line	7.3	11.7	SR 17 (Brookpark Road)	Northern terminus until 1939
Cleveland	10.1	16.3	SR 10 (Lorain Road)	Northern terminus
1.000 mi = 1.609 km; 1.000 km = 0.621 mi
