= Chillicothe Turnpike =

19th century roadway in Ohio, United States

The Chillicothe Turnpike was an early highway in the U.S. state of Ohio that led from Painesville in Northeast Ohio south to Chillicothe in the southern part of the state, which served as state capital on two occasions in the early 19th century. Established in 1802 by Benjamin Tappan, remnants of road named Chillicothe Road still remain on portions of State Route 615, State Route 306, and State Route 43 through Lake, Geauga, and Portage counties.

Ephraim George Squier and Edwin Hamilton Davis, in their 1848 work Ancient Monuments of the Mississippi Valley, noted construction of the turnpike destroyed a portion of the Cedar-Bank Works in Ross County.
