= Ohio State Route 175 =

State highway in Cuyahoga County, Ohio, US

State Route 175
- Richmond Road

Route information
- Maintained by ODOT
- Length: 15.70 mi (25.27 km)
- Existed: 1923–present

Major junctions
- South end: SR 43 in Solon
- I-271 / US 422 in Warrensville Heights; US 422 / SR 87 in Beachwood; US 322 in Lyndhurst; US 6 / SR 84 in Richmond Heights; US 20 in Euclid; I-90 / SR 2 in Euclid
- North end: SR 283 in Euclid

Location
- Country: United States
- State: Ohio
- Counties: Cuyahoga

Highway system
- Ohio State Highway System; Interstate; US; State; Scenic
← SR 174	→ SR 176

State Route 175 (SR 175) is a 15.70-mile (25.27 km) long north–south state highway in the northeastern part of the U.S. state of Ohio. The southern terminus of SR 175 is at a signalized intersection with SR 43 in Solon. Its northern terminus is at a signalized intersection with SR 283 in Euclid.

== Route description ==
All of SR 175 traverses the eastern portion of Cuyahoga County. SR 175 begins at the intersection of Richmond Road and Aurora Road (Ohio State Route 43). It quickly intersects Cannon Road, turns right to follow Cannon Road, and immediately turns left to continue north along Richmond Road. SR 175 intersects with the Outerbelt East Freeway, commonly known as Interstate 271 and also part of U.S. Route 422. However, it is only a partial interchange; there is an exit ramp from I-271 South/US 422 East and an entrance ramp to I-271 North/US 422 West. It soon after intersects with Harvard Road, passing the Ahuja Medical Center and entering the city of Beachwood. Further into Beachwood, it crosses Chagrin Boulevard (now with the US 422 designation) and picks up the designation for OH-87. OH -87 leaves Richmond Road at an intersection for Shaker Boulevard. SR 175 continues through the eastern suburbs of Cleveland, eventually terminating with Lakeshore Boulevard (OH 283).

== History ==
When SR 175 was created in 1923, it ran from Painesville westward along current SR 283 along Lake Erie to the current intersection of SR 175 and SR 283 in Euclid, then turned south along its current alignment until just northwest of its current southern terminus, where it followed Perkins and Columbus Roads southwest to SR 14 in Bedford.

In 1929, the portion of SR 175 along Lake Erie was replaced with part of the SR 6 designation (now SR 283), and SR 175 was shortened to its current northern terminus.

In 1946, SR 175 was re-routed and extended southward through its current southern terminus to SR 14/Broadway Avenue on the boundary between Cuyahoga and Summit Counties, replacing the SR 613 designation that had run between SR 43 and SR 14. (SR 14 was later relocated onto Interstate 480.) By 1967, SR 175 was shortened to its current southern terminus.

== Major intersections ==
The entire route is in Cuyahoga County.

Location	mi	km	Destinations	Notes
Bedford Heights–Solon line	0.00	0.00	SR 43 (Aurora Road)	Southern terminus
Warrensville Heights	2.82	4.54	I-271 north / US 422 west	Exit 28A on I-271 south / US 422 east only
Beachwood	4.75	7.64	US 422 / SR 87 east (Chagrin Boulevard)	Southern terminus of concurrency with SR 87
Beachwood	5.78	9.30	SR 87 west (Shaker Boulevard)	Northern terminus of concurrency with SR 87
Lyndhurst	8.59	13.82	US 322 (Mayfield Road)	
Richmond Heights	12.47	20.07	US 6 (Chardon Road) / SR 84 (White Road)	
Euclid	13.43	21.61	US 20 (Euclid Avenue)	
Euclid	14.36	23.11	I-90 west / SR 2 west (via Lakeland Boulevard)	Exit 184 on I-90 / SR 2 east only
Euclid	15.70	25.27	SR 283 / LECT (Lakeshore Boulevard)	Northern terminus
1.000 mi = 1.609 km; 1.000 km = 0.621 mi: Concurrency terminus; Incomplete access
