= Ohio State Route 306 =

State highway in northeastern Ohio, US

State Route 306

Route information
- Maintained by ODOT
- Length: 27.42 mi (44.13 km)
- Existed: 1932–present

Major junctions
- South end: SR 43 in Aurora
- US 422 in Bainbridge Township; US 322 in Chester Township; US 6 in Kirtland; I-90 in Willoughby; US 20 in Mentor
- North end: SR 283 in Mentor

Location
- Country: United States
- State: Ohio
- Counties: Portage, Geauga, Lake

Highway system
- Ohio State Highway System; Interstate; US; State; Scenic
← SR 305	→ SR 307

State Route 306 (SR 306) is a north–south state highway in northeastern Ohio, running from its southern terminus at SR 43 in Aurora to its northern terminus at SR 283 in Mentor. Most of the road from Aurora north to Kirtland is part of the former Chillicothe Turnpike and is known as Chillicothe Road. The Kirtland Temple, the first temple built by the Latter Day Saint movement (Mormons), is located on SR 306 in central Kirtland.

== History ==
SR 306 was first designated in 1932 following its current route between US 322 and SR 283. In 1935, the Aurora-US 422 segment was brought into the state highway system, but as SR 382. By 1937, the two routes were united as SR 306; also at this time, the road connecting Aurora and Hudson was included as the southernmost segment of SR 306. In 1942, the Hudson-Aurora segment was removed from the state highway system, but by this time, the entire route had been paved. No major changes have occurred to the routing since that time.

== Major junctions ==
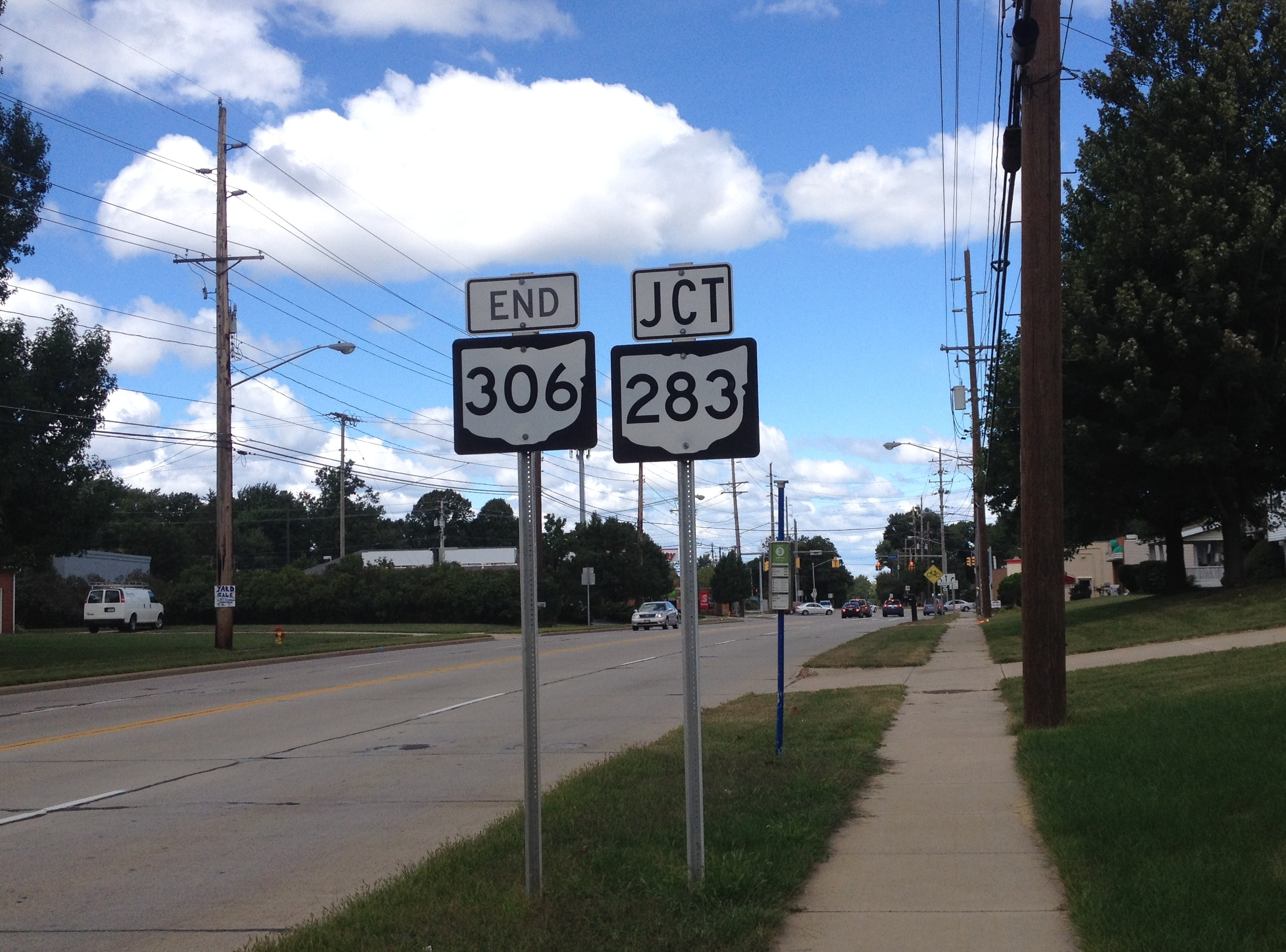
SR 306 at its northern terminus with SR 283 in Mentor.

County	Location	mi	km	Destinations	Notes
Portage	Aurora	0.00	0.00	SR 43 (Aurora Road / Chillicothe Road) – Streetsboro	
Portage	Aurora	0.28	0.45	SR 82 (Garfield Road)	
Geauga	Bainbridge Township	5.25	8.45	US 422 – Warren, Cleveland	Interchange
Geauga	Russell Township	10.45	16.82	SR 87 (Kinsman Road)	
Geauga	Chester Township	14.49	23.32	US 322 (Mayfield Road) – Orwell, Cleveland	
Lake	Kirtland	18.93	30.46	US 6	
Lake	Kirtland	22.11	35.58	SR 615 north (Chillicothe Road) / Eisenhower Drive	Southern terminus of SR 615
Lake	Willoughby	23.20	37.34	I-90 – Erie, PA, Cleveland	Exit 193 (I-90)
Lake	Mentor	23.51	37.84	SR 84 (Johnnycake Ridge Road)	
Lake	Mentor	24.11	38.80	US 20 (Mentor Avenue)	
Lake	Mentor	24.87	40.02	SR 2 – Painesville, Cleveland	Interchange
Lake	Mentor	27.42	44.13	SR 283 / LECT (Lake Shore Boulevard) / Reynolds Road	
1.000 mi = 1.609 km; 1.000 km = 0.621 mi
