= Ohio State Route 283 =

State highway in northeastern Ohio, US

State Route 283

Route information
- Maintained by ODOT
- Length: 29.76 mi (47.89 km)
- Existed: 1932–present
- Tourist routes: LECT

Major junctions
- West end: US 6 in Cleveland
- I-90 / SR 2 in Cleveland; SR 91 in Timberlake; SR 44 in Mentor; SR 2 in Painesville
- East end: US 20 in Painesville

Location
- Country: United States
- State: Ohio
- Counties: Cuyahoga, Lake

Highway system
- Ohio State Highway System; Interstate; US; State; Scenic
← SR 282	→ SR 284
← US 6	→ SR 7

State Route 283 (SR 283) is an east–west state highway in the northeastern portion of the U.S. state of Ohio. Its western terminus at U.S. Route 6 2 1/2 miles northeast of Downtown Cleveland, and its eastern terminus at U.S. Route 20 (Erie Street) in Painesville. Most of the route is known as Lakeshore Boulevard until it approaches the Grand River in Lake County. During its final stretch, its name changes to Olive Street, River Street, and finally to Richmond Street. The entire highway is part of the Lake Erie Circle Tour.

== History ==
The original route was established in 1932; the route east of current State Route 175 was State Route 175 before 1929, and was then the former State Route 6 from 1929 to 1932. In 1959, the portion ranging 4 miles (6.4 km) east of Downtown Cleveland to 3 miles (4.8 km) west of Euclid was upgraded to freeway and dually certified with State Route 2; in 1962, interstate 90 certification was added to it.

== Major intersections ==
County	Location	mi	km	Destinations	Notes
Cuyahoga	Cleveland	0.00	0.00	US 6 (Superior Avenue)	
Cuyahoga	Cleveland	1.84	2.96	I-90 / SR 2 / LECT – Downtown, Erie, PA	Exit 176 (I-90 / SR 2)
Cuyahoga	Cleveland	5.03	8.10	I-90 west / SR 2 west – Downtown	Exit 179 (I-90 / SR 2)
Cuyahoga	Euclid	11.39	18.33	SR 175 south (East 260 Street)	Northern terminus of SR 175
Lake	Willowick	13.69	22.03	SR 640 east (Vine Street)	Western terminus of SR 640
Lake	Timberlake	16.09	25.89	SR 91 south (Som Center Road)	Northern terminus of SR 91
Lake	Mentor	20.80	33.47	SR 306 south (Reynolds Road)	Northern terminus of SR 306
Lake	Mentor-on-the-Lake	21.60	34.76	SR 615 south (Munson Road)	Northern terminus of SR 615
Lake	Mentor	26.57	42.76	SR 44 – Chardon, Headlands Beach	Interchange
Lake	Painesville	28.56	45.96	SR 535 east (Richmond Street) – Fairport Harbor	Western terminus of SR 535
Lake	Painesville	28.69	46.17	SR 2 (Lakeland Freeway) – Downtown, Perry	Interchange
Lake	Painesville	29.76	47.89	US 20 / LECT (Erie Street)	
1.000 mi = 1.609 km; 1.000 km = 0.621 mi: Concurrency terminus
