= Timberlake, Ohio =

- Village
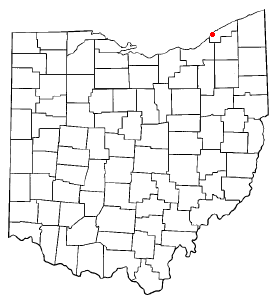
- Location of Timberlake, Ohio

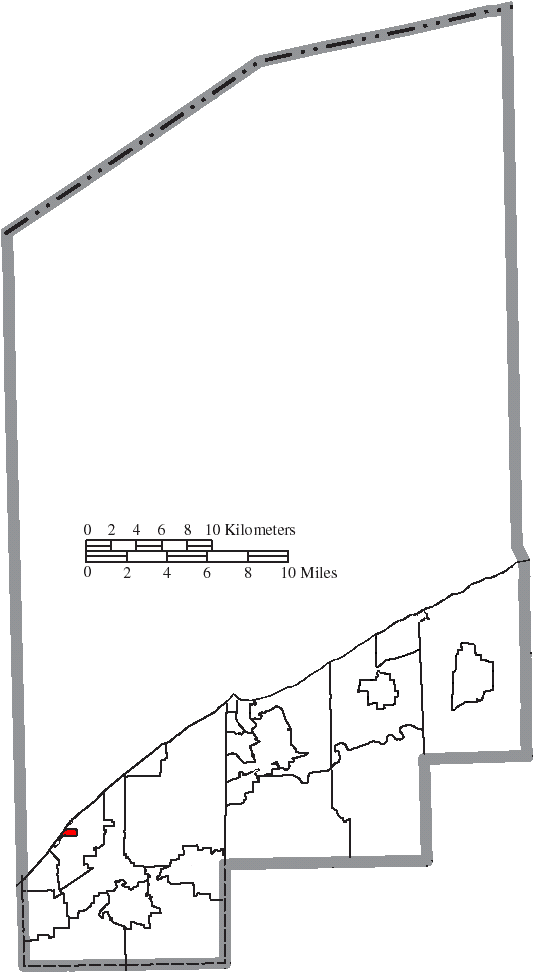
- Location of Timberlake in Lake County
- Coordinates: 41°39′56″N 81°26′34″W
- Country: United States
- State: Ohio
- County: Lake
- Incorporated: 1947

Government
  - Mayor: John Marra (R)

Area
  - Total: 0.21 sq mi (0.55 km^{2})
  - Land: 0.21 sq mi (0.55 km^{2})
  - Water: 0 sq mi (0.00 km^{2})
- Elevation: 617 ft (188 m)

Population (2020)
  - Total: 629
  - Density: 2,981.1/sq mi (1,151.01/km^{2})
- Time zone: UTC-5 (Eastern (EST))
  - Summer (DST): UTC-4 (EDT)
- ZIP code: 44095
- Area code: 440
- FIPS code: 39-76834
- GNIS feature ID: 1086432
- Website: https://villageoftimberlake.com/

Timberlake is a village in Lake County, Ohio, United States. The population was 629 at the 2020 census.

== Geography ==
According to the United States Census Bureau, the village has a total area of 0.21 square miles (0.54 km^{2}), all land.

Timberlake is nearly completely surrounded by Eastlake, with one entrance to the village coming through Lakeline, and the remaining portion bordering Lake Erie.

== Demographics ==
Historical population
Census	Pop.	Note	%±
1950	236		—
1960	670		183.9%
1970	964		43.9%
1980	885		−8.2%
1990	833		−5.9%
2000	775		−7.0%
2010	675		−12.9%
2020	629		−6.8%
U.S. Decennial Census

=== 2010 census ===
As of the census of 2010, there were 675 people, 295 households, and 206 families living in the village. The population density was 3,214.3 inhabitants per square mile (1,241.0/km^{2}). There were 307 housing units at an average density of 1,461.9 per square mile (564.4/km^{2}). The racial makeup of the village was 96.3% White, 0.6% African American, 0.6% Native American, 0.6% Asian, 1.2% from other races, and 0.7% from two or more races. Hispanic or Latino of any race were 2.4% of the population.

There were 295 households, of which 22.7% had children under the age of 18 living with them, 58.6% were married couples living together, 7.8% had a female householder with no husband present, 3.4% had a male householder with no wife present, and 30.2% were non-families. 26.4% of all households were made up of individuals, and 10.8% had someone living alone who was 65 years of age or older. The average household size was 2.29 and the average family size was 2.75.

The median age in the village was 49.6 years. 18.2% of residents were under the age of 18; 4.2% were between the ages of 18 and 24; 19% were from 25 to 44; 36.2% were from 45 to 64; and 22.4% were 65 years of age or older. The gender makeup of the village was 49.2% male and 50.8% female.

=== 2000 census ===
As of the census of 2000, there were 775 people, 309 households, and 225 families living in the village. The population density was 3,614.1 inhabitants per square mile (1,395.4/km^{2}). There were 321 housing units at an average density of 1,496.9 per square mile (578.0/km^{2}). The racial makeup of the village was 99.10% White, 0.26% Asian, 0.26% from other races, and 0.39% from two or more races. Hispanic or Latino of any race were 1.42% of the population. 20.6% were of German, 16.4% Italian, 10.7% Irish, 8.0% Slovene, 5.7% English and 5.6% Polish ancestry according to Census 2000.

There were 309 households, out of which 24.3% had children under the age of 18 living with them, 63.4% were married couples living together, 6.5% had a female householder with no husband present, and 26.9% were non-families. 23.3% of all households were made up of individuals, and 7.4% had someone living alone who was 65 years of age or older. The average household size was 2.51 and the average family size was 2.96.

In the village, the population was spread out, with 19.4% under the age of 18, 7.0% from 18 to 24, 23.1% from 25 to 44, 34.1% from 45 to 64, and 16.5% who were 65 years of age or older. The median age was 46 years. For every 100 females there were 98.7 males. For every 100 females age 18 and over, there were 92.9 males.

The median income for a household in the village was $52,422, and the median income for a family was $57,604. Males had a median income of $40,536 versus $33,125 for females. The per capita income for the village was $24,078. About 0.9% of families and 1.4% of the population were below the poverty line, including 0.7% of those under age 18 and 1.6% of those age 65 or over.

== Education ==
It is in the Willoughby-Eastlake City School District.

== See also ==
- List of villages in Ohio
