= Ohio State Route 52 =

State Route 52

Route information
- Maintained by ODOT

Location
- Country: United States
- State: Ohio

Highway system
- Ohio State Highway System; Interstate; US; State; Scenic
← US 52	→ SR 53

In Ohio, State Route 52 may refer to:

- U.S. Route 52 in Ohio, the only Ohio highway numbered 52 since 1927
- Ohio State Route 52 (1923-1927), now SR 4 (Middletown to Dayton), SR 444 (Dayton to Fairborn), and CR 333 (Fairborn to Springfield)
