= Ohio State Route 20 =

State Route 20

Route information
- Maintained by ODOT

Location
- Country: United States
- State: Ohio

Highway system
- Ohio State Highway System; Interstate; US; State; Scenic
← SR 19	→ SR 21

In Ohio, State Route 20 may refer to:

- U.S. Route 20 in Ohio, the only Ohio highway numbered 20 since 1927
- Ohio State Route 20 (1923-1927), now SR 16 (Columbus to Newcomerstown), CR 21 (Newcomerstown to New Philadelphia), and SR 39 (New Philadelphia to East Liverpool)
