= Ohio State Route 523 =

State highway in Sandusky County, Ohio, US

State Route 523

Route information
- Maintained by ODOT
- Length: 3.79 mi (6.10 km)
- Existed: 1939–present

Major junctions
- West end: SR 19 north of Kingsway
- East end: SR 53 northeast of Fremont

Location
- Country: United States
- State: Ohio
- Counties: Sandusky

Highway system
- Ohio State Highway System; Interstate; US; State; Scenic
← SR 522	→ SR 524

Ohio State Route 523 (OH 523) is a state highway in North Central Ohio. A short connector route, OH 523 links OH 19 at its western terminus with OH 53 at its eastern terminus. OH 523's intersection with OH 53 is located less than 4 miles (6.4 km) northeast of the OH 53 exit off of I-80/I-90/Ohio Turnpike.

== Route description ==
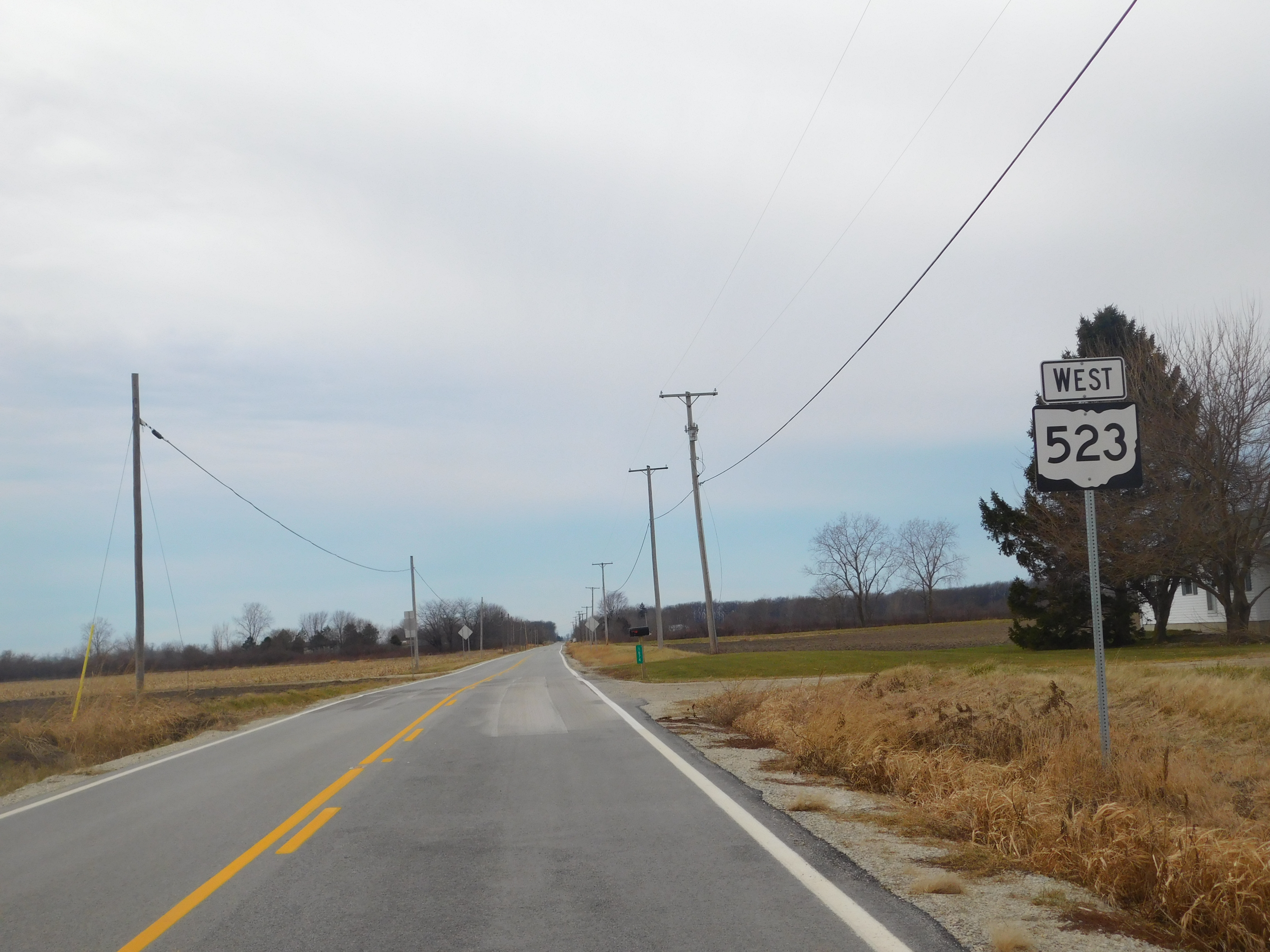
OH 523 westbound from OH 53 in Rice Township

OH 523 begins at an intersection with OH 19 and County Road 143 in Rice Township. The route heads eastward along a flat terrain, passing a couple of homes and then progressing through fields and nothing else around it. There is an intersection with Fangboner Road (Township Road 166) soon after, but there is no intersections with other state-maintained roads afterwards. County Road 170 comes soon after, crossing at about the midpoint of the highway.

As the road progresses eastward, there are intersections with county roads 174 and 182 and one township road. OH 523 terminates at an intersection with OH 53 in Rice Township, nearly 4 miles (6.4 km) to the east of OH 19.

== History ==
OH 523 was assigned to its current routing in 1939, and has not seen any changes of significance since its inception.

== Junctions ==
The entire route is in Rice Township, Sandusky County.

mi	km	Destinations	Notes
0.00	0.00	SR 19 (Oak Harbor Road)	
3.79	6.10	SR 53	
1.000 mi = 1.609 km; 1.000 km = 0.621 mi
