= Ohio State Route 412 =

State highway in Sandusky County, Ohio, US

State Route 412

Route information
- Maintained by ODOT
- Length: 12.42 mi (19.99 km)
- Existed: 1969–present

Major junctions
- West end: US 20 / SR 19 near Fremont
- East end: SR 101 near Castalia

Location
- Country: United States
- State: Ohio
- Counties: Sandusky

Highway system
- Ohio State Highway System; Interstate; US; State; Scenic
← SR 387	→ SR 416

State Route 412 (SR 412) is an east–west state highway in northern Ohio. The western terminus of State Route 412 is just northeast of Fremont at a diamond interchange with the U.S. Route 20/State Route 19 duplex, which follows the Fremont Bypass at that point. The eastern terminus of the state highway is at a T-intersection with State Route 101 approximately 3 miles (4.8 km) southwest of Castalia.

== Route description ==
State Route 412 runs exclusively within Sandusky County. No portion of this route is incorporated in the National Highway System.

== History ==
Making its debut in 1969, State Route 412 was designated along what was formerly the portion of State Route 12 east of Fremont. In that year, State Route 12 was truncated back to its new eastern terminus at its junction with State Route 53 southwest of Fremont, and consequently, State Route 412 was established.

== Major intersections ==
The entire route is in Sandusky County.

Location	mi	km	Destinations	Notes
Riley Township	0.00	0.00	US 20 / SR 19 – Toledo, Norwalk	Interchange
Riley Township	5.70	9.17	SR 510 – Clyde	
Townsend Township	12.42	19.99	SR 101 – Castalia	
1.000 mi = 1.609 km; 1.000 km = 0.621 mi
