= Ohio State Route 19 =

State highway in Ohio, US

State Route 19

Route information
- Maintained by ODOT
- Length: 86.48 mi (139.18 km)
- Existed: 1932–present

Major junctions
- South end: US 42 / CR 22 near Mount Gilead
- US 30 in Bucyrus; US 224 near Bloomville; US 20 in Green Creek Township; US 6 in Fremont; US 6 / US 20 / SR 53 in Fremont; SR 163 near Oak Harbor
- North end: SR 2 near Oak Harbor

Location
- Country: United States
- State: Ohio
- Counties: Morrow, Crawford, Seneca, Sandusky, Ottawa

Highway system
- Ohio State Highway System; Interstate; US; State; Scenic
← SR 18	→ US 20
← US 62	→ SR 63

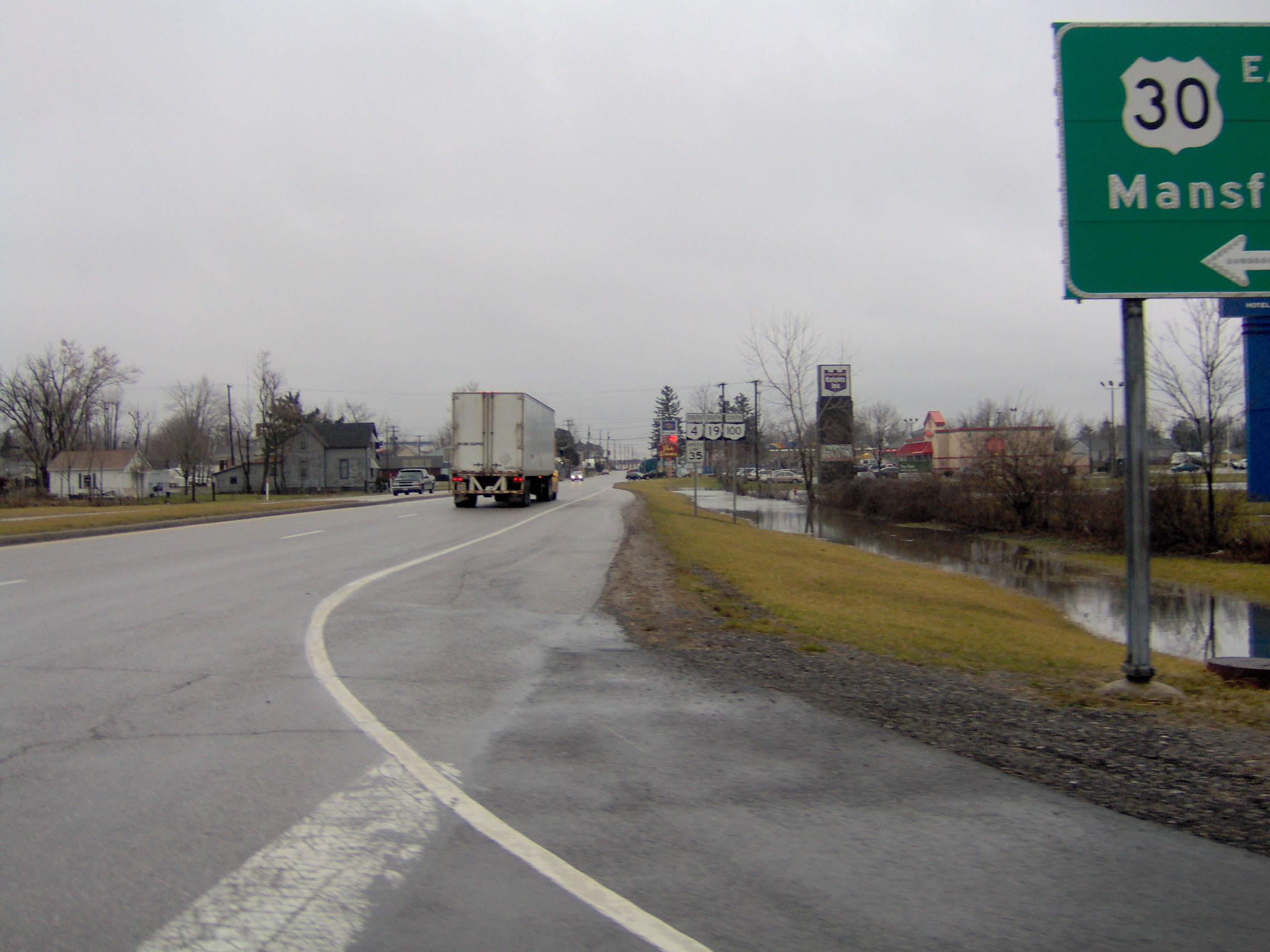
State Route 19 concurrent with State Routes 4 and 100 near Bucyrus

State Route 19 (SR 19) is a north–south route in northern and central Ohio. Its southern terminus is at U.S. Route 42 in the unincorporated village of Williamsport, and its northern terminus is at State Route 2 north of Oak Harbor.

== History ==
The current State Route 19 was certified in 1932 and originally went from Galion to Oak Harbor, going through Fremont on State Street (U.S. Route 20) and Stone Street. The route was extended in the north to State Route 2 in 1938, and in the south to U.S. Route 42 in 1939. In 1960, State Route 19 was rerouted around Fremont along with U.S. Route 20, U.S. Route 6, and State Route 53 (Ohio) via a freeway bypass.

The route number 19 was used for the route of an original state highway that went from Columbus to the Pennsylvania state line. This route is now the eastern Ohio portion of U.S. Route 62. The route number was then given to the route of the former State Route 62, which the U.S. highway system had made defunct.

== Major intersections ==
County	Location	mi	km	Exit	Destinations	Notes
Morrow	Congress Township	0.00	0.00		US 42 / CR 22 – Mansfield, Mount Gilead	
Morrow	North Bloomfield Township	8.78	14.13		SR 288 – Lexington	
Crawford	Galion	11.90	19.15		SR 97 east (Harding Way) / Cummings Avenue	Southern end of SR 97 concurrency
Crawford	Galion	12.60	20.28		SR 61 north / SR 309 east (East Street) / SR 97 ends	Northern end of SR 97 concurrency; southern end of SR 61 / SR 309 concurrency
Crawford	Galion	13.87	22.32		SR 61 south / SR 309 west / SR 598 north (Portland Way)	Northern end of SR 61 / SR 309 concurrency; southern terminus of SR 598
Crawford	Polk–Whetstone township line	17.05	27.44		SR 602 north – North Robinson	Southern terminus of SR 602
Crawford	Whetstone Township	21.51	34.62		SR 100 south	Southern end of SR 100 concurrency
Crawford	Bucyrus	24.92	40.10		SR 4 south / SR 98 south (North Sandusky Avenue) / West Perry Street	Southern end of SR 4 / SR 98 concurrency
Crawford	Bucyrus	25.12	40.43		SR 98 north (Plymouth Street)	Northern end of SR 98 concurrency
Crawford	Bucyrus	25.92	41.71		US 30 – Mansfield, Upper Sandusky	Interchange
Crawford	Bucyrus	26.48	42.62		SR 4 north – Sandusky	Northern end of SR 4 concurrency
Crawford	Lykens Township	33.68	54.20		SR 100 north / CR 27 (Carey Road) – Tiffin	Northern end of SR 100 concurrency
Crawford	Lykens Township	35.69	57.44		SR 103 – Sycamore, Chatfield	
Seneca	Bloom–Scipio township line	44.75	72.02		US 224 – Attica, Tiffin	
Seneca	Republic	47.75	76.85		SR 162 (Jefferson Street) – North Fairfield	
Seneca	Republic	47.86	77.02		SR 18 / SR 67 south (Kilbourne Street) – Bellevue, Tiffin	Northern terminus of SR 67
Seneca	Adams Township	53.86	86.68		SR 228 north / CR 32 – Clyde	Southern terminus of SR 228
Seneca	Adams Township	55.49	89.30		SR 101	
Seneca	Adams Township	55.89	89.95		SR 778 south / CR 44	Northern terminus of SR 778
Sandusky	Green Creek Township	64.23	103.37		US 20 east / Shock Road – Clyde	Southern end of US 20 concurrency
Sandusky	Green Creek Township	64.53– 64.70	103.85– 104.12	105	State Street – Fremont	Interchange; northbound exit / southbound entrance only
Sandusky	Sandusky Township	66.52	107.05	103	SR 412 east (Castalia Street)	Interchange; western terminus of SR 412
Sandusky	Fremont	67.47	108.58	102	US 6 east / North 5th Street – Sandusky	Interchange; southern end of US 6 concurrency
Sandusky	Fremont	68.88	110.85	101	SR 53 north to Ohio Turnpike / Rawson Avenue – Port Clinton, Lake Erie Islands	Interchange; southern end of SR 53 concurrency
Sandusky	Fremont	69.64	112.07	100	US 6 west / US 20 west / SR 53 south / Oak Harbor Road – Toledo, Bowling Green, Tiffin	Interchange; northern end of US 6 / US 20 / SR 53 concurrency
Sandusky	Rice Township	74.93	120.59		SR 523 east / T-143	Western terminus of SR 523
Ottawa	Oak Harbor	79.85	128.51		SR 105 west / SR 163 (Water Street)	Eastern terminus of SR 105
Ottawa	Carroll Township	86.48	139.18		SR 2 / LECT – Oregon, Toledo, Port Clinton	
1.000 mi = 1.609 km; 1.000 km = 0.621 mi: Concurrency terminus; Incomplete access
