= OH4 =

OH-4 may refer to:

- Ohio's 4th congressional district
- Original military designation of the Bell 206.
- Ohio State Route 4
