= U.S. Route 6 in Ohio =

Segment of American highway

U.S. Route 6
- Grand Army of the Republic Highway
- US 6 highlighted in red

Route information
- Maintained by ODOT
- Length: 248.002 mi (399.121 km)
- Existed: 1931–present
- Tourist routes: Lake Erie Circle Tour

Major junctions
- West end: US 6 at the Indiana state line near Edgerton
- US 127 / SR 2 / SR 15 in Pulaski; I-75 near Bowling Green; US 20 in Fremont; US 250 in Sandusky; US 422 / SR 8 / SR 14 / SR 43 / SR 87 in Cleveland; US 322 in Cleveland; I-90 in Cleveland; SR 44 in Chardon; SR 11 in Dorset; SR 7 / SR 85 in Andover
- East end: US 6 at the Pennsylvania state line near Pierpont

Location
- Country: United States
- State: Ohio
- Counties: Williams, Henry, Wood, Sandusky, Erie, Lorain, Cuyahoga, Lake, Geauga, Ashtabula

Highway system
- United States Numbered Highway System; List; Special; Divided; Ohio State Highway System; Interstate; US; State; Scenic
← SR 5	→ SR 6

U.S. Route 6 (US 6) is a part of the United States Numbered Highway System that runs from Bishop, California, to Provincetown, Massachusetts. In Ohio, the road runs west–east from the Indiana state line near Edgerton to the Pennsylvania state line near Andover. The 248.002 miles (399.121 km) that lie in Ohio are maintained by the Ohio Department of Transportation (ODOT). US 6 serves the major cities of Sandusky, Lorain, and Cleveland. The highway is also called the Grand Army of the Republic Highway to honor the Union forces of the U.S. Civil War. The alternate name was designated in 1953.

US 6 originally ran from Massachusetts to Pennsylvania. It was extended through Ohio to Colorado in June 1931. The route of US 6 has remained largely unchanged since 1931.

== Route description ==
US 6 traverses the far northern portion of Ohio, passing through 10 counties. The highway travels through largely farm and field country until it reaches Sandusky. After Sandusky, US 6 travels along the coast of Lake Erie until Cleveland. From Cleveland to the Pennsylvania state line, US 6 passes through mostly wooded land.

=== Western Ohio ===
US 6 crosses into Williams County at the Indiana state line between Butler, Indiana, and Edgerton. The highway goes east from the border, passing through the small town of Edgerton, where it has a brief concurrency with State Route 49 (SR 49). Continuing east through farm country, US 6 passes through Ridgeville Corners, until reaching Napoleon in Henry County, where it intersects US 24, starting a 4.6-mile-long (7.4 km) concurrency. East of Napoleon, US 6 passes through McClure. US 6 passes south of the college town of Bowling Green 15 miles (24 km) east of McClure, intersecting with Interstate 75 (I-75). Along this 15-mile (24 km) stretch, the road crosses into Wood County. Just east of Bowling Green, US 6 has a one-mile-long (1.6 km) overlap with SR 199.

US 6 continues through rural country until it passes just north of Bradner. Here, the highway intersects US 23 at the Wood–Sandusky county line. In Sandusky County, US 6 passes through the small towns of Rollersville and Helena before reaching the city of Fremont. In Fremont, US 6 overlaps with SR 53 for 4.1 miles (6.6 km), US 20 for 3.9 miles (6.3 km), and SR 19 for 2.6 miles (4.2 km). US 6 skirts the northern city limits of Fremont before turning northeast just east of Fremont. Three miles (4.8 km) from Fremont, US 6 crosses under I-80/I-90, but there is not an interchange between the highways. US 6 crosses into Erie County 11 miles (18 km) northeast of the Interstate.

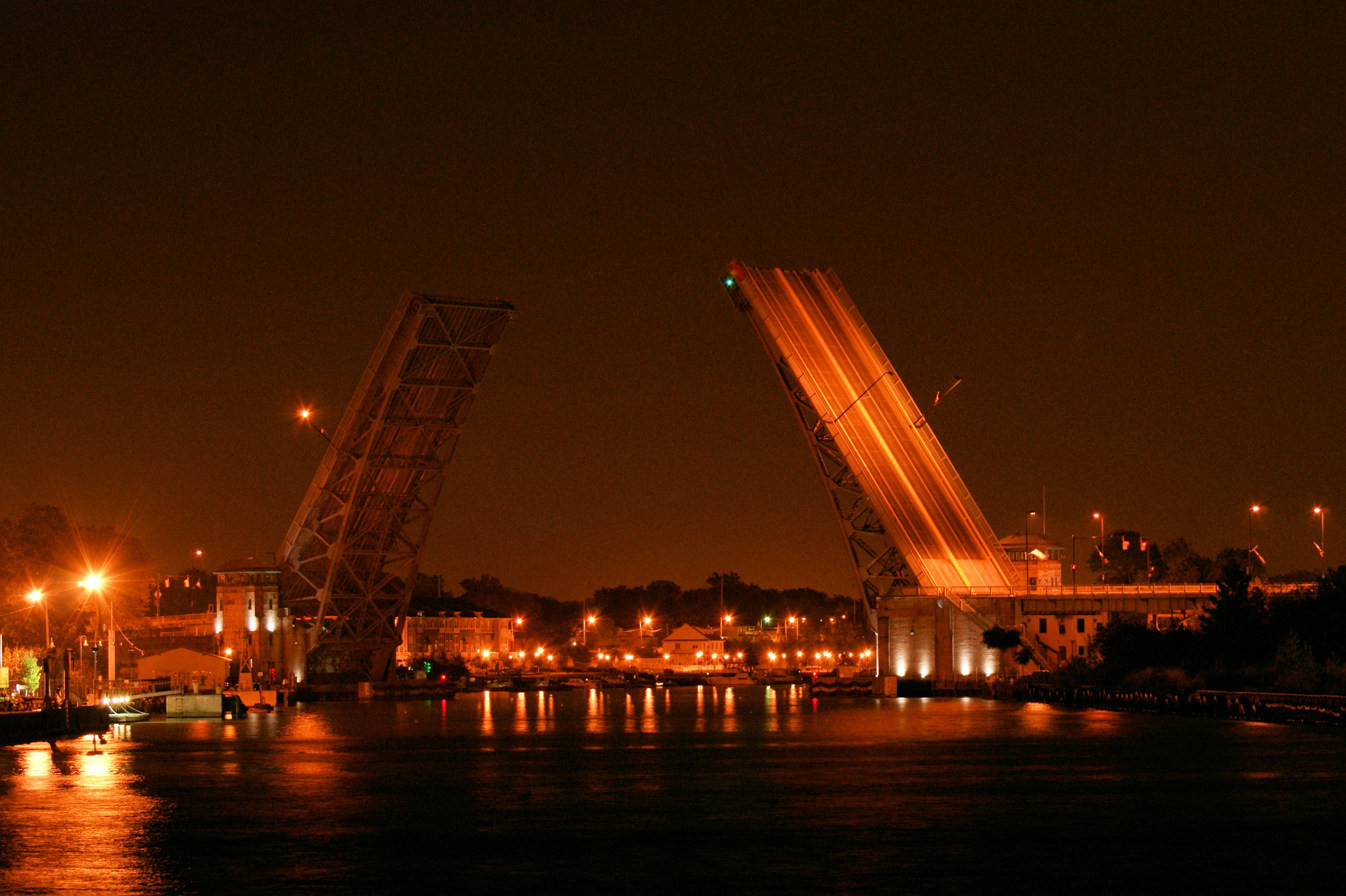
The Charles Berry Bridge over the Black River in Lorain

Just into Erie County, US 6 overlaps SR 269 for 0.6 miles (0.97 km), then intersects SR 2 1.8 miles (2.9 km) east of the SR 269 concurrency. Just east of this intersection, US 6 enters the city of Sandusky. US 6 passes through a largely residential part of Sandusky. Locally, the highway is also known as Tiffin Avenue, West Washington Street, Warren Street, and Cleveland Road West. Cedar Point is accessed from US 6. Southeast of Sandusky, US 6 passes Griffing Sandusky Airport near Fairview Lanes. As US 6 continues east through Erie County, it passes through the city of Huron, the communities of Mitiwanga and Beulah Beach, and the city of Vermilion before crossing into Lorain County. East of Vermilion, in Lorain County, US 6 enters the city of Lorain, the last major city before the highway reaches Cleveland. In Lorain, US 6 stays close to the Lake Erie shoreline and crosses the Black River on the Charles Berry Bridge, the second-largest bascule bridge in the world. East of Lorain, US 6 passes through Sheffield Lake and Avon Lake before crossing into Cuyahoga County.

=== Cleveland ===
After passing through Bay Village, US 6 enters the suburbs of Cleveland. In Rocky River, US 6 starts concurrencies with SR 2 and US 20. Also, US 6 Alternate starts in Rocky River and winds along Detroit Avenue for 7.3 miles (11.7 km) to its eastern terminus just west of the Cuyahoga River in the Ohio City neighborhood.

US 6 enters the city of Cleveland during its overlap with SR 2 and US 20. US 6, along with US 20, splits from SR 2 just before it crosses the Cuyahoga River on the Main Avenue Bridge. US 6 meets up with SR 3 and US 42 at West 25th Street, and the four highways (US 6, US 20, US 42, and SR 3) cross the Cuyahoga River on the Detroit–Superior Bridge. At the east end of the bridge, following Superior Avenue, US 6 passes through Public Square. Here, the concurrencies with US 20, US 42, and SR 3 end. US 322 also starts a concurrency with US 6 in Public Square that ends 0.5 miles (0.80 km) east of the plaza

East of Public Square, US 6 has an interchange with I-90. US 6 starts another concurrency with US 20 4.5 miles (7.2 km) east of this intersection in East Cleveland that lasts for 4.2 miles (6.8 km). After splitting from US 20, US 6 runs concurrent with SR 84 for 2.1 miles (3.4 km) before entering Lake County.

=== Eastern Ohio ===
The 10.23 miles (16.46 km) that lie within Lake County pass through many small residential developments in Willoughby Hills and Kirtland before crossing into Geauga County. In Geauga County, US 6 passes through the city of Chardon, where it has a brief overlap with SR 44. In Chardon, US 6 turns northeast to serve Hambden and Montville townships before crossing into Ashtabula County.

In Ashtabula County, US 6 travels straight east through the townships of Hartsgrove, Rome, New Lyme, and Cherry Valley, as well as the village of Andover before turning north with SR 7. US 6 breaks its concurrency with SR 7 7.5 miles (12.1 km) north of Andover, turns east, and enters Pennsylvania in Crawford County, just north of the Pymatuning Reservoir.

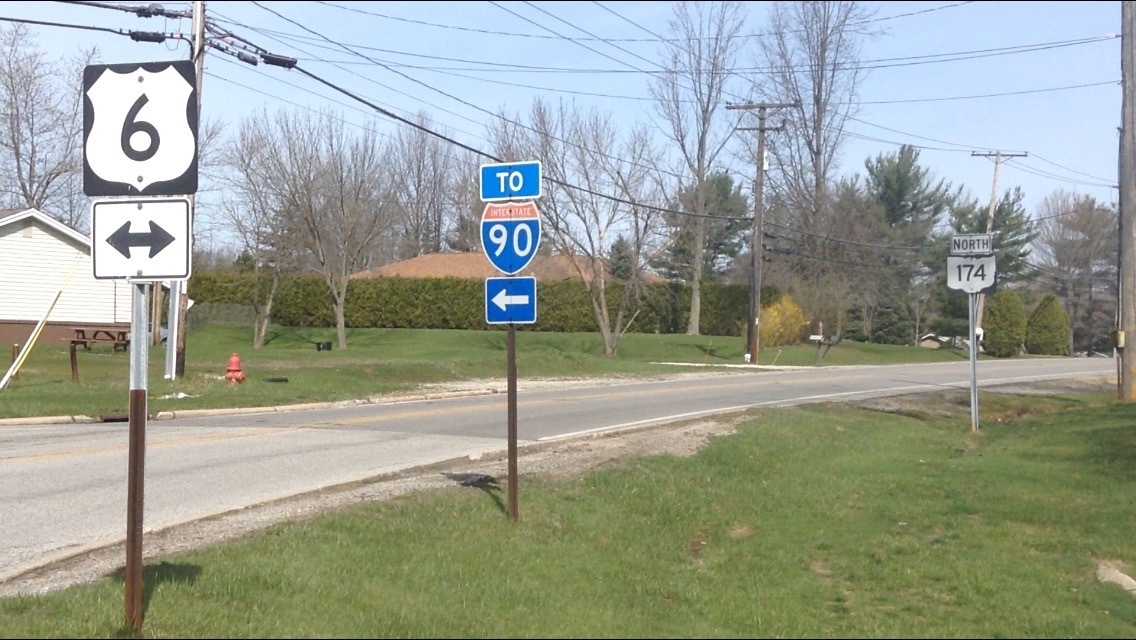
US 6 at SR 174 in Willoughby Hills, Lake County

== History ==
US 6 was one of the original routes created when the U.S. Numbered Highway System was formed. Originally, US 6 was only routed from Provincetown, Massachusetts, to Brewster, New York. Soon after, it was routed to Pennsylvania and was alternatively named the Roosevelt Highway. The route was not extended into Ohio until 1931, when the highway was expanded to Greeley, Colorado. The Ohio routing established in 1931 has not been changed since then.

By the 1930s, the Roosevelt Highway name had started to fade. Major William Anderson Jr. took notice of this and proposed the idea of redesignating the highway to honor Union forces during the Civil War. Veteran associations started promoting the idea in 1934. Because each state along the highway owned its portion of US 6, each state had to act on the proposal. Each state had approved the renaming by 1953, and it was in that year that US 6 was designated as the Grand Army of the Republic Highway along its entire length. The name is signed in all 14 states that US 6 passes through.

== Major intersections ==
County	Location	mi	km	Exit	Destinations	Notes
Williams	St. Joseph Township	0.00	0.00		US 6 west – Butler, Kendallville, Chicago	Indiana state line
Williams	Edgerton	2.98	4.80		SR 49 south (Michigan Avenue)	Western end of SR 49 concurrency
Williams	Edgerton	3.03	4.88		SR 49 north (Michigan Avenue) to Ohio Turnpike	Eastern end of SR 49 concurrency
Williams	Center Township	10.21	16.43		SR 576 – Montpelier, Williams Center	
Williams	Center Township	10.98	17.67		SR 2 west / CR 12C – Williams Center, Hicksville	Western end of SR 2 concurrency
Williams	Pulaski Township	13.41	21.58		US 127 / SR 2 east / SR 15 – Bryan, Sherwood	Eastern end of SR 2 concurrency
Williams	Springfield Township	20.89	33.62		SR 191 north / CR 22A – Stryker, West Unity, Evansport	Southern terminus of SR 191
Williams	Springfield Township	23.25	37.42		SR 66 south / CR 24 – Defiance	Western end of SR 66 concurrency
Henry	Ridgeville Township	26.13	42.05		SR 66 north / CR 23 – Archbold, Sauder Village	Eastern end of SR 66 concurrency
Henry	Ridgeville Township	27.90	44.90		SR 34 west – Bryan	Eastern terminus of SR 34
Henry	Napoleon Township	35.19	56.63		US 24 west / Woodlawn Avenue – Defiance, Fort Wayne, Napoleon	Western end of US 24 concurrency; partial cloverleaf interchange; western end of freeway; US 6 west follows exit 39 (formerly exit 36)
Henry	Napoleon	36.72	59.10	40	SR 108 / US 6 Bus. east – Wauseon, Napoleon	
Henry	Napoleon	38.19	61.46	41	Industrial Drive (CR 503)	
Henry	Liberty Township	40.20	64.70		US 24 east – Maumee, Toledo	Eastern end of US 24 concurrency; eastbound exit and westbound entrance; US 6 east follows exit 43; formerly exit 40A
Henry	Liberty Township	40.62	65.37	44A	CR 424 – Napoleon	No westbound entrance; former SR 424; formerly exit 40B
Henry	Harrison Township	41.02	66.02	44B	SR 110 to US 24 east – Grand Rapids, Napoleon	Eastern end of freeway; formerly exit 41
Henry	Harrison Township	43.63	70.22		County Road O (US 6 Bus. west) – Henry County Airport	
Henry	Harrison Township	44.17	71.08		SR 109 – Liberty Center, Malinta	
Henry	McClure	49.21	79.20		SR 65	
Wood	Weston Township	57.29	92.20		SR 235 – Weston, Hoytville, McComb	
Wood	Center Township	64.929	104.493	65	SR 25 – Bowling Green, Portage	Diamond interchange
Wood	Center Township	66.40	106.86	66A-B	I-75 – Toledo, Dayton	Diamond interchange; signed as exits 66A (south) and 66B (north); I-75 exit 179
Wood	Freedom Township	72.27	116.31		SR 199 north – Perrysburg	Western end of SR 199 concurrency
Wood	Freedom Township	73.24	117.87		SR 199 south – Fostoria	Eastern end of SR 199 concurrency
Wood	Freedom Township	76.68	123.40		SR 281 west – Bradner, Wayne	Eastern terminus of SR 281
Wood–Sandusky county line	Freedom–Scott township line	77.69	125.03		US 23 – Rising Sun, Fostoria	
Sandusky	Madison Township	82.71	133.11		SR 300 north – Gibsonburg	Southern terminus of SR 300
Sandusky	Washington Township	85.21	137.13		SR 635 south	Northern terminus of SR 635
Sandusky	Jackson Township	87.74	141.20		SR 590 – Lindsey, Bettsville	
Sandusky	Ballville Township	90.68	145.94		SR 53 south – Tiffin	Western end of SR 53 concurrency
Sandusky	Sandusky Township	92.47	148.82	98	US 20 west – Fremont, Toledo	Western end of US 20 concurrency; western end of freeway; formerly exit 92; no westbound exit into Fremont; exit 98 is signed eastbound only (US 6 west follows exit 98)
Sandusky	Fremont	93.82	150.99	100	SR 19 north – Oak Harbor	Western end of SR 19 concurrency; formerly exit 94
Sandusky	Fremont	94.75	152.49	101	SR 53 north – Port Clinton, Lake Erie Islands	Eastern end of SR 53 concurrency; formerly exit 95
Sandusky	Fremont	96.50	155.30		US 20 east / SR 19 south – Norwalk	Eastern end of US 20/SR 19 concurrences; eastern end of freeway; US 6 east follows exit 102
Sandusky	Riley Township	103.38	166.37		SR 510 south – Clyde	Northern terminus of SR 510
Erie	Margaretta Township	111.52	179.47		SR 269 south – Bellevue, Castalia	Western end of SR 269 concurrency
Erie	Margaretta Township	112.15	180.49		SR 269 north – Bayview	Eastern end of SR 269 concurrency
Erie	Sandusky	113.93	183.35		SR 2 / LECT – Toledo, Cleveland	interchange
Erie	Sandusky	115.90	186.52		SR 101 west – Castalia	West end of SR 101 overlap
Erie	Sandusky	116.55	187.57		Sanford Street	Former SR 387 east
Erie	Sandusky	118.20	190.22		SR 4 south (Columbus Avenue)	Northern terminus of SR 4; east end of SR 101 overlap
Erie	Sandusky	119.19	191.82		US 250 east (Sycamore Line) to I-80 / I-90 / SR 2 / Ohio Turnpike	Western terminus of US 250
Erie	Sandusky	119.72	192.67		To Butler Street / US 250	
Erie	Sandusky	120.14	193.35		Cedar Point Drive - Cedar Point	
Erie	Huron	125.65	202.21		SR 2 west / Rye Beach Road west	Western end of SR 2 concurrency; western end of freeway
Erie	Huron	126.70	203.90		SR 2 east – Cleveland	Eastern end of SR 2 concurrency; eastbound exit and westbound entrance; eastern end of freeway
Erie	Huron	127.74	205.58		SR 13 south (Main Street)	Northern terminus of SR 13
Erie	Berlin Township	131.34	211.37		SR 61 south – Berlin Heights, Norwalk	Northern terminus of SR 61
Erie	Vermilion	138.75	223.30		SR 60 south (Main Street)	Northern terminus of SR 60
Lorain	Lorain	146.51	235.78		SR 611 east (West 21st Street) – Lorain	Western terminus of SR 611; interchange; eastbound exit and westbound entrance
Lorain	Lorain	147.85	237.94		SR 58 south (Leavitt Road) to Ohio Turnpike – Amherst	Northern terminus of SR 58
Lorain	Lorain	149.29	240.26		SR 57 south (Broadway Avenue) – Elyria	Northern terminus of SR 57
Lorain	Sheffield Lake	155.05	249.53		SR 301 south (Abbe Road)	Northern terminus of SR 301
Lorain	Avon Lake	158.19	254.58		SR 83 south (Avon Belden Road)	Northern terminus of SR 83
Cuyahoga	Bay Village	164.74	265.12		SR 252 south (Columbia Road)	Northern terminus of SR 252
Cuyahoga	Rocky River	168.07	270.48		SR 2 west / SR 254 (Detroit Road)	Western end of SR 2 overlap; interchange; westbound exit and eastbound entrance
Cuyahoga	Rocky River	168.27	270.80		US 6 Alt. (West Lake Road) / Detroit Road – truck route	Western terminus of US 6 Alt.; interchange; eastbound exit and westbound entrance
Cuyahoga	Lakewood	169.06	272.08		US 20 west / SR 237 south (West Clifton Boulevard)	Northern terminus of SR 237; Western end of US 20 concurrency
Cuyahoga	Cleveland	173.1	278.6		Lake Avenue / West Boulevard	interchange; westbound exit and eastbound entrance; west end of freeway
Cuyahoga	Cleveland	173.89	279.85		West 73rd Street	former exit 192
Cuyahoga	Cleveland	174.62	281.02		West 45th Street / West 49th Street	former exit 193A
Cuyahoga	Cleveland	175.26	282.05		SR 2 east / LECT east	Eastern end of SR 2 concurrency; eastbound exit and westbound entrance; eastern end of freeway; US 6 east follows exit 193B
Cuyahoga	Cleveland	175.38	282.25		US 6 Alt. west (Detroit Avenue) / US 42 south / SR 3 south (West 25th Street)	Eastern terminus of US 6 Alt.; western terminus of US 42 / SR 3 concurrency
Cuyahoga	Cleveland	175.45	282.36	Detroit-Superior Bridge over the Cuyahoga River		
Cuyahoga	Cleveland	176.30	283.73		Ontario Street (US 422 east / SR 8 south / SR 14 east / SR 43 south / SR 87 east) / Euclid Avenue (US 20 east)	Public Square; eastern terminus of US 20 concurrency; termini of US 42, US 322, US 422, SR 3, SR 8, SR 14, SR 43, SR 87
Cuyahoga	Cleveland	176.85	284.61		US 322 east (East 13th Street)	Eastern end of US 322 concurrency
Cuyahoga	Cleveland	177.61	285.84		I-90 to I-71 / I-77 / SR 2	I-90 exit 173C
Cuyahoga	Cleveland	178.81	287.77		SR 283 east (East 55th Street)	Western terminus of SR 283
Cuyahoga	East Cleveland	182.07	293.01		US 20 west (Euclid Avenue)	Western end of US 20 concurrency
Cuyahoga	Euclid	186.29	299.80		US 20 east (Euclid Avenue)	Eastern end of US 20 concurrency; west end of SR 84 overlap
Cuyahoga	Richmond Heights	188.50	303.36		SR 175 (Richmond Road)	
Lake	Willoughby Hills	189.57	305.08		SR 84 east (Bishop Road) to I-90	Eastern end of SR 84 concurrency
Lake	Willoughby Hills	191.74	308.58		SR 91 (Som Center Road) to I-90	
Lake	Willoughby Hills	192.90	310.44		SR 174 (River Road)	
Lake	Kirtland	196.54	316.30		SR 306 (Chillicothe Road)	
Geauga	Chardon	204.43	329.00		SR 44 south (South Street) / South Hambden Street	Western end of SR 44 concurrency
Geauga	Chardon	204.63	329.32		SR 44 north (Center Street)	Eastern end of SR 44 concurrency
Geauga	Hambden Township	207.98	334.71		SR 608	
Geauga	Hambden Township	208.23	335.11		SR 166 east (Rock Creek Road)	Western terminus of SR 166
Geauga	Montville Township	212.62	342.18		SR 86 (Plank Road)	
Geauga	Montville Township	213.04	342.85		SR 528 – Madison, Middlefield	
Ashtabula	Hartsgrove Township	218.09	350.98		SR 534 – Geneva, Newton Falls	traffic circle
Ashtabula	Rome Township	222.67	358.35		SR 45 – Rock Creek, Warren	
Ashtabula	New Lyme Township	227.06	365.42		SR 46 – Jefferson, Cortland	
Ashtabula	New Lyme Township	230.52	370.99		SR 11 – Ashtabula, Youngstown	interchange
Ashtabula	Cherry Valley Township	232.97	374.93		SR 193 – North Kingsville	
Ashtabula	Andover	237.94	382.93		SR 7 south / SR 85 east	Western end of SR 7 concurrency; traffic circle
Ashtabula	Pierpont Township	245.45	395.01		SR 7 north – Conneaut	Eastern end of SR 7 concurrency
Ashtabula	Pierpont Township	248.10	399.28		US 6 east – Conneaut Lake	Pennsylvania state line
1.000 mi = 1.609 km; 1.000 km = 0.621 mi: Concurrency terminus; Incomplete access

== See also ==
U.S. Route 6
Previous state: Indiana	Ohio	Next state: Pennsylvania
