= Ohio State Route 510 =

State highway in Sandusky County, Ohio, US

State Route 510

Route information
- Maintained by ODOT
- Length: 7.03 mi (11.31 km)
- Existed: 1937–present

Major junctions
- South end: SR 101 in Clyde
- US 20 in Clyde
- North end: US 6 near Bay View

Location
- Country: United States
- State: Ohio
- Counties: Sandusky

Highway system
- Ohio State Highway System; Interstate; US; State; Scenic
← SR 509	→ SR 511

State Route 510 (SR 510) is a north–south state highway in the northern portion of Ohio. The entirety of SR 510 lies within Sandusky County. Its southern terminus is at SR 101 in Clyde, and its northern terminus is at U.S. Route 6 (US 6) between Fremont and Sandusky.

== Route description ==
SR 510 runs exclusively within Sandusky County. The highway is not included as a part of the National Highway System.

SR 510 begins in downtown Clyde at a signalized intersection with SR 101, where Main Street and Maple Street meet. Following Main Street north from there, the state highway crosses the Norfolk Southern Railway tracks, then passes some homes and then a small commercial district as it arrives at its junction with US 20. Continuing north, SR 510 passes through a residential area, intersecting a few side streets along the way. Departing Clyde heading due north, SR 510 enters into rural Sandusky County, specifically Green Creek Township, and passes amid wide-open farmland, with homes appearing every so often along the roadway. SR 510 meets Bookmeyer Road, then goes on to intersect Sandusky County Road 229 (CR 229), at which point the state highway enters into Riley Township. Further north, SR 510 passes through respective intersections with CR 231 and CR 233 before arriving at its junction with SR 412. Just north of there, SR 510 passes underneath the Ohio Turnpike, which carries Interstates 80 and 90. North of there, continuing its way through farm country, SR 510 crosses CR 247 en route to arriving at its endpoint at US 6. Continuing north of US 6 after SR 510 terminates is Brugger Road.

== History ==
In 1937, SR 510 came into being along the routing between SR 101 and US 6 that it occupies today. No significant changes have taken place to this highway since its inception.

== Major intersections ==
The entire route is in Sandusky County.

Location	mi	km	Destinations	Notes
Clyde	0.00	0.00	SR 101 (Main Street / Maple Street)	
Clyde	0.21	0.34	US 20 (McPherson Highway)	
Riley Township	4.30	6.92	SR 412 (Castalia Road) – Fremont, Castalia	
Riley Township	7.03	11.31	US 6 / Brugger Road – Fremont, Sandusky	
1.000 mi = 1.609 km; 1.000 km = 0.621 mi
