= Ohio State Route 269 =

North-south state highway in Ohio, US

State Route 269

Route information
- Maintained by ODOT
- Length: 28.09 mi (45.21 km)
- Existed: 1931–present

Major junctions
- South end: SR 4 near Bellevue
- US 20 / SR 18 / SR 113 in Bellevue; US 6 near Crystal Rock
- North end: Merritime Shoreway at East Harbor State Park near Marblehead

Location
- Country: United States
- State: Ohio
- Counties: Huron, Erie, Ottawa

Highway system
- Ohio State Highway System; Interstate; US; State; Scenic
← SR 268	→ I-270

State Route 269 (SR 269) is a north–south state highway in the north central portion of the U.S. state of Ohio. Its southern terminus is at SR 4 on the Huron–Seneca county line nearly seven miles (11 km) south of Bellevue, and its northern terminus is at the entrance to East Harbor State Park near Marblehead.

== History ==
SR 269 was first designated in 1928 albeit on a much shorter route than it runs today. The original two-mile-long (3.2 km) route served as a cutoff to the Sandusky Bay Bridge on SR 2 and SR 12 (modern-day U.S. Route 6). In 1935, the route was extended south to end in Castalia at SR 12 (now on a different route than it was in 1928) and SR 101. Two years later, SR 269 was extended much further south through Bellevue to its current southern terminus at SR 4. The extension of SR 296 to SR 4 lead to the deletion of SR 296 as SR 269 was routed along the latter's entire route between SR 4 and Bellevue.

The route was extended north c. 1969 after SR 2 was moved onto the new Thomas Edison Bridge over the Sandusky Bay. SR 269 utilized the old Bay Bridge and followed the former SR 240 to East Harbor State Park. Though the Bay Bridge was closed in 1985, SR 269 would still be officially designated on the approach routes until SR 269 was moved onto the SR 2 freeway, the Edison Bridge, and a former spur route of SR 269 by 1997.

== Major junctions ==
County	Location	mi	km	Destinations	Notes
Huron–Seneca county line	Sherman–Thompson township line	0.00	0.00	SR 4	
Huron–Seneca county line	Sherman–Thompson township line	1.97	3.17	SR 547 east / Kotz Road	Western terminus of SR 547
Huron	Bellevue	6.90	11.10	US 20 / SR 18 / SR 113 (Main Street)	
Erie	Castalia	15.60	25.11	SR 101 south (Lucas Street)	Southern end of SR 101 concurrency
Erie	Castalia	16.05	25.83	SR 101 north (Main Street)	Southern end of SR 101 concurrency
Erie	Margaretta Township	18.78	30.22	US 6 west – Fremont	Southern end of US 6 concurrency
Erie	Margaretta Township	19.41	31.24	US 6 east – Sandusky	Northern end of US 6 concurrency
Erie	Margaretta Township	20.67	33.27	SR 2 / LECT east / Martins Point Road – Sandusky, Cleveland	Interchange; southern end of SR 2 concurrency
Sandusky Bay		22.57	36.32	Thomas A. Edison Memorial Bridge	
Ottawa	Danbury Township	24.07	38.74	SR 2 / LECT west – Port Clinton, Toledo	Interchange; northern end of SR 2 concurrency
Ottawa	Danbury Township	26.51	42.66	SR 163 west (East Harbor Road) – Port Clinton	Southern end of SR 163 concurrency
Ottawa	Danbury Township	26.94	43.36	SR 163 east (East Harbor Road) – Lakeside, Marblehead	Northern end of SR 163 concurrency
Ottawa	Danbury Township	28.09	45.21	East Harbor State Park entrance	
1.000 mi = 1.609 km; 1.000 km = 0.621 mi: Concurrency terminus
