= Ohio State Route 101 =

State highway in Ohio, US

State Route 101

Route information
- Maintained by ODOT
- Length: 37.09 mi (59.69 km)
- Existed: 1924–present

Major junctions
- West end: SR 18 / SR 53 in Tiffin
- US 20 in Clyde; US 6 in Sandusky
- East end: SR 4 in Sandusky

Location
- Country: United States
- State: Ohio
- Counties: Seneca, Sandusky, Erie

Highway system
- Ohio State Highway System; Interstate; US; State; Scenic
← SR 100	→ SR 102

State Route 101 (SR 101) is a southwest-northeast (signed east–west) state highway in the north central portion of the U.S. state of Ohio. Its western terminus is at the junction of SR 18 and SR 53 in Tiffin; it runs concurrently with SR 18 for about one mile (1.6 km). Its eastern terminus is at the junction of U.S. Route 6 (US 6) and SR 4 in Sandusky; it runs concurrently with US 6 for just over one and a half miles (2.4 km) to its western terminus.

== Route description ==
The highway begins in the county seat of Seneca County, Tiffin, at the intersection of Market Street and Sandusky Street. Sandusky Street carries SR 53 north and south through the area while the one way Market Street carries only eastbound traffic for SR 18. Eastbound SR 18 and SR 101 head east along Market Street crossing the Sandusky River and intersecting Washington Street (SR 100 / SR 231; the latter's northern terminus). At the campus of Heidelberg University, Market Street begins to curve to the northeast reaching an intersection with Perry Street. In downtown Tiffin, Perry Street carries westbound SR 18 and SR 101 traffic (officially designated SR 18-D and SR 101-D) while it carries both directions of SR 18 east of the city. After exiting the city, SR 101 heads northeast through mostly farmland with some patches of woodlands and residential clusters. In the northeast corner of the county in Adams Township, SR 101 intersects three state highways in close proximity to each other: SR 778, SR 19, and SR 228. SR 778 and SR 228 are shortcuts to SR 19 as SR 19 briefly travels east and west across SR 101.

Soon after entering Sandusky County, SR 101 makes a left turn to head due north towards the city of Clyde. Through the city, SR 101 first travels along South Main Street. In the center, SR 101 turns northeast onto East Maple Street while SR 510 continues north along Main Street. The highway intersects US 20 inside the city limits but exits soon after. Heading northeasterly again, the road again passes through mainly farmland but single-family homes line the road throughout the rest of its trip through Sandusky County. The highway passes over the Ohio Turnpike (Interstates 80 and 90) without an interchange and intersects SR 412 at its eastern terminus. About 0.2 miles (0.32 km) east of this intersection, SR 101 enters Erie County. At first, SR 101 deviates from its northeasterly bearing and travels more northerly before curving to due east following the southern border of Castalia. At a T-intersection with SR 269, SR 101 turns left onto SR 269 passing through a mostly residential neighborhood of the village on Washington Street. After crossing a culvert over the Castalia Pond, the road comes to the central business district of the village. SR 101 ends its concurrency with SR 269 by turning right onto Main Street. The road heads back to its northeastern bearing and comes to an interchange with the SR 2 freeway. About one and a quarter miles (2.0 km) northeast of the interchange, just before reaching the Sandusky city limits, SR 101 makes a sharp reverse curve towards the north passing through a light industrial area of western Sandusky before reaching an intersection with US 6. The official SR 101 designation ends at this intersection however signage shows SR 101 traveling east along US 6 into downtown Sandusky. After the aforementioned intersection, US 6 and SR 101 pass over a Norfolk Southern railroad on an overpass and curve to the northeast to travel along Tiffin Avenue. Tiffin Avenue and Washington Street pass mostly through residential neighborhoods until it reaches Washington Park in the center of the city. Signage for SR 101 ends at its intersection with Columbus Avenue which also marks the northern terminus of SR 4. US 6 continues east along Washington Street for another block.

== History ==
SR 101 was designated in 1923 following the same Tiffin–Clyde–Sandusky route it follows today. At the time of its designation, the route was a mix of dirt roads, gravel roads, and asphalt-paved roads. The road was fully paved by 1929. In 1932, SR 12 was routed along SR 101 from what is now SR 412 into downtown Sandusky. This configuration would last until the late 1960s when SR 12 was truncated and the segment between Fremont and SR 101 was redesignated SR 412.

Near the southern city limits of Sandusky, SR 101 formerly traveled on a straight line along Tiffin Avenue where it began a concurrency with US 6 at Venice Road and Sanford Street. Because of long-time concerns about a grade crossing with the Norfolk Southern railroad at Tiffin Street and nearby Venice Street (which carried US 6 at the time). The project to realign the two highways began in 2010 and was completed four years later. As of June 2015, the former alignment of SR 101 is designated SR 101-J (with former alignments of Venice Road being designated US 6-C and US 6-J); the "J" suffix meant that the route is awaiting abandonment by the Ohio Department of Transportation.

== Major intersections ==
County	Location	mi	km	Destinations	Notes
Seneca	Tiffin	0.00	0.00	SR 18 west (Market Street) / SR 53 (Sandusky Street)	Western end of SR 18 concurrency
Seneca	Tiffin	0.55	0.89	SR 100 / SR 231 south (Washington Street)	Northern terminus of SR 231
Seneca	Tiffin	1.01	1.63	SR 18 east / SR 101 west (Perry Street)	Eastern end of SR 18 concurrency; eastern end of SR 18 / SR 101 one-way pair
Seneca	Adams Township	9.66	15.55	SR 778 north / CR 43 – Green Springs	Southern terminus of SR 778
Seneca	Adams Township	10.23	16.46	SR 19 – Bucyrus, Fremont	
Seneca	Adams Township	12.07	19.42	SR 228 south / CR 180 (Rowe Road)	Northern terminus of SR 238
Sandusky	Clyde	18.47	29.72	SR 510 north (North Main Street) / West Maple Street	Southern terminus of SR 510
Sandusky	Clyde	18.70	30.09	US 20 (McPherson Highway)	
Sandusky	Townsend Township	26.48	42.62	SR 412 west – Fremont	Eastern terminus of SR 412
Erie	Castalia	29.42	47.35	SR 269 south (Washington Street)	Western end of SR 269 concurrency
Erie	Castalia	29.88	48.09	SR 269 north (Washington Street)	Eastern end of SR 269 concurrency
Erie	Margaretta Township	32.83– 33.01	52.83– 53.12	SR 2 – Cleveland, Toledo	Interchange
Erie	Sandusky	34.79	55.99	US 6 / LECT west	Western end of US 6 concurrency
Erie	Sandusky	37.09	59.69	US 6 east (Washington Street) / LECT south (Columbus Street) / SR 4	Eastern end of US 6 concurrency; northern terminus of SR 4
1.000 mi = 1.609 km; 1.000 km = 0.621 mi: Concurrency terminus
