= Ohio State Route 228 =

State highway in Seneca County, Ohio, US

State Route 228

Route information
- Maintained by ODOT
- Length: 1.30 mi (2.09 km)
- Existed: 1924–present

Major junctions
- South end: SR 19 near Green Springs
- North end: SR 101 near Green Springs

Location
- Country: United States
- State: Ohio
- Counties: Seneca

Highway system
- Ohio State Highway System; Interstate; US; State; Scenic
← SR 227	→ SR 229

State Route 228 (SR 228) is a short north–south state highway in the U.S. state of Ohio. The southern terminus of the state route is at State Route 19 (SR 19) nearly five and a half miles (8.9 km) north of Republic. Its northern terminus is at SR 101 approximately 5.5 miles (8.9 km) southwest of Clyde.

The state highway was established in 1924. It serves as a connector between SR 19 and SR 101 east and northeast of where the two routes intersect. SR 19 jogs west from SR 228's southern terminus, and SR 101 traverses in a southwest-to-northeast fashion, creating a tight angle between the two routes. SR 778 serves a similar purpose to SR 228 to the west and southwest of the junction of SR 19 and SR 101.

== Route description ==
SR 228 is located entirely within Adams Township in Seneca County, and it has an annual average daily traffic count of 320. The short connector route begins where SR 19 and County Road 32 (CR 32) meet, an intersection in which SR 19 forms the southern and western legs and CR 32 approaches from the east. The route passes through mostly farmland. After that, SR 228 arrives at its endpoint at the intersection of SR 101, where it crosses southwest-to-northeast, and Township Road 180 (Rowe Road) continues to the northwest after SR 228 terminates.

== History ==
SR 228 came into being in 1924 along the routing that it occupies to this day. No significant changes have taken place to the route since its designation. The route was repaved in 1969, 1983, and 1995.

== Major intersections ==
The entire route is in Adams Township, Seneca County.

mi	km	Destinations	Notes
0.00	0.00	SR 19	
1.30	2.09	SR 101 (Portland Road)	
1.000 mi = 1.609 km; 1.000 km = 0.621 mi
