= Carrie Chase Davis =

American physician, suffragist

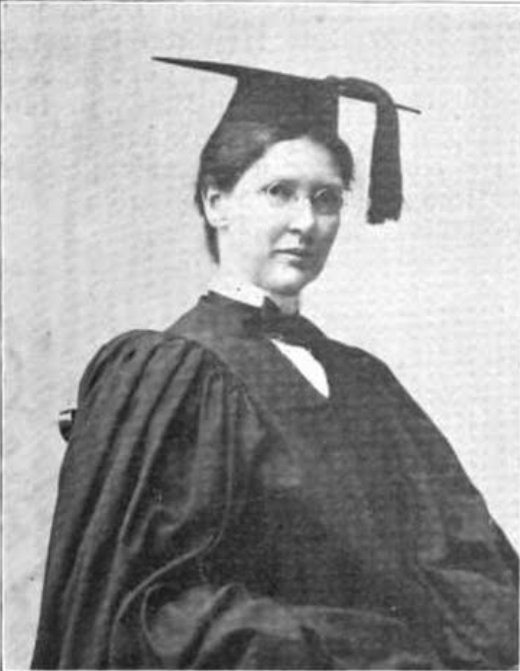
Carrie Chase Davis, 1900

Carrie Chase Davis (13 August 1863 – 22 March 1953) was an American physician and suffragist. After teaching for some years, she graduated with a medical degree from Howard University College of Medicine in 1897, with a specialization in Bacteriology. She was one of the leading women practitioners of the Western Reserve and was also prominent as a woman suffragist of the west. Davis served as secretary of the Erie County Medical Society, and as recording secretary of the Ohio Woman Suffrage Association.

== Early years, family and education ==
Carrie Chase Davis was born August 13, 1863, on a farm near Castalia, Ohio. She was a daughter of Thomas Robert (born February 14, 1824) and Sarah Ann (Chase) Davis (born September 13, 1841). Her father was a native of New York City and became well known as a leading farmer and stock raiser near Sandusky, Ohio. His home was one of the best known stations on the Underground Railroad between the US and Canada. He was a graduate of Oberlin College and a Congregationalist with wide influence. Sarah Ann Chase was born near Castalia. Carrie's parents married on October 20, 1859. Carrie had a younger sister, May Davis (born in Castalia April 5, 1866), who also became a physician. Their grandparents were Henry Nichols Chase and Mary Chapman Waller Chase; and Dr. Thomas Davis and Mary Avery Davis.

The Davis family left Ohio in 1868, settling at Bloomington, Illinois, so the daughters could have better school advantages. For nine years, Davis obtained her early education at Normal, Illinois, where her mother died in 1875. The father and daughters relocated to Unionville. Davis attended and graduated (1884) from Normal School and Business Institute at Stanberry, Missouri. In 1885 and 1886, she attended the State Normal School, Emporia, Kansas.

In 1893, Davis relocated to Washington, D.C. where she attended Howard University Medical College, sessions 26, 27, 28, 29, graduating in 1897.

== Career ==
Davis and her sister were successful educators. In 1887, Davis took up a homestead in Trego County, Kansas, making a final proof on the property on March 4, 1893. During these six years, she taught in the schools and teachers' institutes of Trego, Brown, and Sheridan counties. She left her teaching profession in 1893 to attend medical school in Washington, DC.

After finishing her medical education, Carrie practiced medicine in Washington until December 1897, when she gained experience as a resident physician at Lying in Charity Hospital, Philadelphia, Pennsylvania, in 1898. After her graduation from that program in 1899, she moved to Sandusky, where she commenced her medical practice. For the next decade, she steadily progressed professionally.

Davis was a leading member of the Erie County Medical Society, of which she was secretary, and was also actively identified with the Ohio State and the American Medical Associations.

== Activism ==
Davis was widely recognized as a champion of women's rights, especially in the matter of obtaining the privilege of suffrage. Her prominence as a suffragist was further indicated by the fact that for a number of years, she held the position of recording secretary of the Ohio Woman Suffrage Association. She was president of the Civic Club of Sandusky, a member of the board of managers of the Rest Room, and a member of the Daughters of the American Revolution. In religion, Davis belonged to the Congregational church.

== Personal life ==
Davis died at age 89 in Tennessee, 22 March 1953, and willed her body to Vanderbilt University School of Medicine.
