= U.S. Route 20 in Ohio =

Section of U.S. Highway in Ohio

U.S. Route 20
- US 20 highlighted in red

Route information
- Maintained by ODOT
- Length: 260.54 mi (419.30 km)
- Existed: 1926–present
- Tourist routes: Lake Erie Circle Tour

Major junctions
- West end: US 20 at the Indiana border near Edon
- US 127 in Fayette; I-475 / US 23 in Toledo; I-75 / US 23 in Perrysburg; US 6 in Fremont; US 250 in Norwalk; I-80 near Elyria; I-90 in Cleveland; US 422 / SR 8 / SR 14 / SR 43 / SR 87 in Cleveland; SR 11 in Edgewood
- East end: US 20 at the Pennsylvania border in Conneaut

Location
- Country: United States
- State: Ohio
- Counties: Williams, Fulton, Lucas, Wood, Sandusky, Huron, Lorain, Cuyahoga, Lake, Ashtabula

Highway system
- United States Numbered Highway System; List; Special; Divided; Ohio State Highway System; Interstate; US; State; Scenic
← SR 19	→ SR 20

U.S. Route 20 (US 20) is a United States Numbered Highway that runs from Newport, Oregon, to Boston, Massachusetts. Within the state of Ohio, the route runs from the Indiana border near Edon to the Pennsylvania border at Conneaut. The route passes through rural areas west of Toledo and passes through Public Square in Cleveland. It is one of nine other routes to enter Downtown Cleveland at Public Square, and it serves some of Cleveland's northeastern suburbs.

== History ==
Prior to the establishment of the U.S. Numbered Highway System in 1926, the general routing of US 20 was occupied by State Route 23 (SR 23) from the Indiana state line to Toledo, SR 102 from Toledo to Woodville, and SR 2 from Woodville east to the Ohio–Pennsylvania border. The route has existed closely to its 1926 routing, except for three bypasses: a rerouting of US 20 near Elyria in 1988, one built around the north side of Fremont between 1957 and 1958, and a second built around the south side of Norwalk by 1967. By 1932, US 20 between Pioneer and Maumee had become US 20N and a US 20S designation had been created to the south between those points; by 1935, US 20N had reverted to US 20 and US 20S had become US 20A.

== Route description ==
US 20 enters the state in Northwest Township, Williams County. The route parallels the Ohio Turnpike (Interstate 80 [I-80]/I-90) through rural farmland in the northwest corner of the state. Within the city of Toledo, the route turns north–south along Reynolds Road, which becomes Conant Street as the route enters Maumee. After crossing the Maumee River into Perrysburg, US 20 continues through downtown Perrysburg, then angles southeasterly, becoming concurrent with US 23 until Woodville. US 20 continues southeasterly toward the bypass of Fremont, most of which is concurrent with US 6.

From Fremont eastward, the route becomes a divided highway, except when passing through the communities of Clyde, Bellevue, and Monroeville. The route bypasses Norwalk to the south as an expressway, with much of the old routing of US 20 maintained as part of SR 61. Near Oberlin, US 20 once again becomes an expressway, until the route continues northward on a divided bypass on the east side of Elyria while the freeway continues easterly as SR 10. US 20 turns east again on the east side of Elyria, following Cleveland Street and Center Ridge Road through western suburban Cleveland.

In Lakewood, the route becomes concurrent with US 6 and SR 2, with a portion of the route following the Cleveland Memorial Shoreway. US 20 departs from the Shoreway then crosses the Detroit–Superior Bridge over the Cuyahoga River into Downtown Cleveland. From there, the route passes through Public Square easterly, paralleling US 322 one block to the south until nearing Case Western Reserve University. It travels northeasterly through the east side of Cleveland as Euclid Avenue, then through the suburbs of Euclid, Wickliffe, Willoughby, Mentor, Ohio, and Painesville, then continues easterly, roughly paralleling the Lake Erie shoreline through Geneva, Ashtabula, and Conneaut and into Pennsylvania.

== Major intersections ==
County	Location	mi	km	Exit	Destinations	Notes
Williams	Northwest Township	0.00	0.00		US 20 west – Angola	Indiana state line
Williams	Northwest Township	2.07	3.33		SR 49 south to Ohio Turnpike / CR 3 – Edon, Edgerton	Western terminus of SR 49 concurrency
Williams	Northwest Township	3.07	4.94		SR 49 north / CR 4 – Cooney, Camden, MI	Eastern terminus of SR 49 concurrency
Williams	Bridgewater Township	9.13	14.69		SR 576 north / CR 10 – Bridgewater Center, Hillsdale, MI	Western terminus of SR 576 concurrency
Williams	Bridgewater Township	10.14	16.32		SR 576 south / CR 11 – Montpelier	Eastern terminus of SR 576 concurrency
Williams	Bridgewater–Madison township line	12.05– 12.11	19.39– 19.49		US 20A east – Holiday City	Western terminus of US 20A
Williams	Madison Township	14.33	23.06		SR 15 – Pioneer, Holiday City, Bryan	
Williams	Mill Creek Township	21.96– 21.99	35.34– 35.39		US 127 south / CR 22Q – West Unity, Bryan	Western terminus of US 127 concurrency
Fulton	Gorham Township	24.64– 24.76	39.65– 39.85		US 127 north (Meridian Road) – Hudson, MI	Eastern terminus of US 127 concurrency
Fulton	Fayette	26.39	42.47		SR 66 south (Fayette Street)	Northern terminus of SR 66
Fulton	Chesterfield Township	33.08	53.24		SR 108 north / CR 18	Western terminus of SR 108 concurrency
Fulton	Chesterfield Township	36.08	58.07		SR 108 south – Wauseon	Eastern terminus of SR 108 concurrency
Fulton	Royalton Township	42.11	67.77		SR 109 – Adrian, Michigan, Delta	
Fulton	Assumption	48.53	78.10		SR 64 / SR 120 west – Metamora, Swanton	Western terminus of SR 120 concurrency
Lucas	Richfield Township	52.34	84.23		SR 295 (Berkey Southern Road) – Berkey, Whitehouse	
Lucas	Sylvania	59.77	96.19		I-475 / US 23 – Maumee, Ann Arbor, Michigan	Exit 13 on I-475; single-point urban interchange
Lucas	Sylvania	60.88	97.98		SR 120 east (Central Avenue)	Eastern terminus of SR 120 concurrency
Lucas	Toledo	62.63	100.79		SR 246 (Dorr Street)	
Lucas	Toledo	65.17	104.88		SR 2 (Airport Highway)	
Lucas	Maumee	66.91– 67.17	107.68– 108.10		I-80 / I-90 / Ohio Turnpike – Chicago, Cleveland	Double trumpet interchange; exit 59 on Ohio Turnpike
Lucas	Maumee	68.71	110.58		US 20A west (Illinois Avenue) / Indiana Avenue	Eastern terminus of US 20A
Lucas	Maumee	68.85	110.80		US 24 / SR 25 north (Anthony Wayne Trail) to I-475 / US 23	Western terminus of SR 25 concurrency
Wood	Perrysburg	69.91	112.51		SR 25 south (Boundary Street) / SR 65 south / US 20 Truck east	Eastern terminus of SR 25 concurrency; western terminus of SR 65 concurrency
Wood	Perrysburg	70.59	113.60		SR 65 north (Front Street)	Eastern terminus of SR 65 concurrency
Wood	Perrysburg	70.85	114.02		SR 199 (Louisiana Avenue)	Northern terminus of SR 199; western terminus of SR 795
Wood	Perrysburg	71.09	114.41		SR 795 east (Indiana Avenue) / Locust Street	Eastern terminus of SR 795 concurrency
Wood	Perrysburg	72.11– 72.41	116.05– 116.53		I-75 / US 23 north / US 20 Truck west – Dayton, Ann Arbor, Toledo	Western terminus of US 23 concurrency; exit 193 on I-75
Wood	Troy Township	78.32	126.04		SR 163 east	Western terminus of SR 163
Wood	Troy Township	80.52– 81.46	129.58– 131.10	81A	SR 420 to I-280 – Toledo	To Ohio Turnpike (I-80/I-90); exits 81A and 81B are connected eastbound; SR 420 exits 1A-B
Wood	Troy Township	81.09– 81.46	130.50– 131.10	81B	Pemberville Road	
Wood–Sandusky county line	Troy–Woodville township line	83.47	134.33		US 23 south / CR 2 (North Fostoria Road) – Fostoria	Eastern terminus of US 23 concurrency
Sandusky	Woodville	86.11	138.58		SR 105 west (Pemberville Road)	Western terminus of SR 105 concurrency
Sandusky	Woodville	86.65	139.45		SR 105 east (Water Street)	Eastern terminus of SR 105 concurrency
Sandusky	Woodville Township	89.16	143.49		SR 300 south / Magsig Road – Gibsonburg	Northern terminus of SR 300
Sandusky	Woodville–Washington township line	90.30	145.32		SR 51 north / CR 66 (Township Line Road) – Elmore	Southern terminus of SR 51
Sandusky	Hessville	93.70	150.80		SR 600 west / CR 92 (Hessville Road) – Gibsonburg	Eastern terminus of SR 600
Sandusky	Washington Township	94.90	152.73		SR 590 – Lindsey, Bettsville	
Sandusky	Sandusky Township	98.06– 98.76	157.81– 158.94	98	US 6 west / SR 53 south / State Street – Tiffin, Fremont	Western terminus of US 6 / SR 53 concurrencies; western end of expressway; no westbound access State Street east; former exit 92
Sandusky	Fremont	99.71– 100.02	160.47– 160.97	100	SR 19 north / Oak Harbor Road – Oak Harbor	Western terminus of SR 19 concurrency; former exit 94
Sandusky	Fremont	100.55– 101.01	161.82– 162.56	101	SR 53 north / Rawson Avenue – Port Clinton, Lake Erie Islands, Sandusky County Fairgrounds	Eastern terminus of SR 53 concurrency; former exit 95
Sandusky	Fremont	102.15– 102.40	164.39– 164.80	102	US 6 east / North 5th Street – Sandusky	Eastern terminus of US 6 concurrency
Sandusky	Sandusky Township	102.93– 103.28	165.65– 166.21	103	SR 412 (Castalia Street)	
Sandusky	Green Creek Township	104.92– 104.95	168.85– 168.90	105	State Street — Fremont	Westbound exit and eastbound entrance; eastern end of expressway
Sandusky	Green Creek Township	105.39	169.61		SR 19 south / South Shock Road – Green Springs	Eastern terminus of SR 19 concurrency
Sandusky	Clyde	109.68	176.51		SR 510 (Main Street)	
Sandusky	Clyde	109.87	176.82		SR 101 (Maple Street)	
Sandusky	Bellevue	117.07	188.41		SR 18 west (Kilbourne Street) / Exchange Street	Western terminus of SR 18 concurrency
Sandusky–Huron county line	Bellevue	117.199	188.614		To SR 269 south (Northwest Street / Monroe Street) / Southwest Street	Unsigned SR 269-D; unsigned western terminus of SR 113
Huron	Bellevue	117.20	188.62		SR 269 (Sandusky Street)	
Huron	Bellevue	118.08	190.03		SR 113 east to Ohio Turnpike	Western terminus of SR 113 concurrency
Huron	Bellevue	119.609	192.492		SR 4 to Ohio Turnpike – Bucyrus, Sandusky	
Huron	Monroeville	124.46	200.30		SR 99 / SR 547 Truck west (North Ridge Street) – Willard	Western terminus of SR 547 Truck concurrency
Huron	Monroeville	125.11	201.35		SR 547 west (Monroe Street) / Milan Avenue	Eastern terminus of SR 547; eastern terminus of SR 547 Truck
Huron	Ridgefield Township	127.56– 127.73	205.29– 205.56	—	To SR 61 – Norwalk	Eastbound exit and westbound entrance; via unsigned SR 61-C
Huron	Norwalk	130.44– 130.76	209.92– 210.44	—	US 250 / SR 13 to Ohio Turnpike – Norwalk, Ashland	Interchange
Huron	Norwalk	132.43– 132.80	213.13– 213.72	—	SR 18 east / Woodlawn Avenue	Interchange; eastern terminus of SR 18 concurrency
Huron	Norwalk	133.34	214.59	—	Cleveland Road	Eastern end of expressway
Huron	Norwalk–Townsend township line	134.93	217.15		SR 601 – Milan, Summit Motorsports Park	
Huron	Wakeman	141.80– 141.87	228.20– 228.32		SR 303 east (Townsend Street)	Western terminus of SR 303
Huron	Wakeman	142.72	229.69		SR 60 south (River Street) / South Railroad Street – Ashland, New London	Western terminus of SR 60 concurrency
Huron	Wakeman	142.85	229.89		SR 60 – Vermilion	Eastern terminus of SR 60 concurrency
Lorain	Camden Township	147.85	237.94		SR 511 – Kipton, Oberlin, Ashland	
Lorain	Oberlin	152.39	245.25		SR 58 – Oberlin, Lorain, Wellington, Ashland	
Lorain	New Russia Township	154.36	248.42	Western terminus of freeway		
Lorain	New Russia Township	155.42– 155.73	250.12– 250.62	—	SR 511 west – Milan	Eastern terminus of SR 511
Lorain	Carlisle Township	158.66– 159.01	255.34– 255.90	—	SR 301 south (Lagrange Road)	Western terminus of SR 301 concurrency
Lorain	Carlisle Township	160.95– 161.27	259.02– 259.54	—	Grafton Road	
Lorain	Eaton Township	161.50– 162.12	259.91– 260.91	—	SR 10 east to I-480 – Cleveland SR 57 / SR 301 north – Grafton, Medina	Eastern end of expressway; western terminus of SR 57 concurrency
Lorain	Elyria	165.20	265.86		SR 301 north / SR 57 north / SR 113 west (John F. Kennedy Memorial Parkway) / Cleveland Street – Lorain	Eastern terminus of SR 301 / SR 57 concurrency; western terminus of SR 113 concurrency
Lorain	North Ridgeville	168.34	270.92		SR 83 (Avon Belden Road) – Avon Lake, Wooster	
Cuyahoga	Westlake	176.09	283.39		SR 252 (Columbia Road)	
Cuyahoga	Rocky River	180.70	290.81		SR 254 west (Detroit Road) / SR 113 south (Wooster Road / West Lake Road) / US 6 Alt. west	Eastern terminus of SR 254 (unsigned SR 254-D); western terminus of US 6 Alt. concurrency
Cuyahoga	Lakewood	180.90	291.13		US 6 Alt. east (Detroit Avenue) / Valley Parkway	Eastern terminus of US 6 Alt. concurrency
Cuyahoga	Lakewood	181.45	292.02		SR 237 south (West Clifton Boulevard) / Northwood Avenue	Western terminus of SR 237 concurrency
Cuyahoga	Lakewood	181.79	292.56		US 6 west / SR 2 west / LECT west (Clifton Boulevard)	Western terminus of US 6 / SR 2 concurrency; termini of SR 237 and SR 113 (unsigned)
Cuyahoga	Cleveland	185.94	299.24	Western terminus of Cleveland Memorial Shoreway		
Cuyahoga	Cleveland	185.94– 186.09	299.24– 299.48	—	Lake Avenue / West Boulevard	Westbound exit and eastbound entrance
Cuyahoga	Cleveland	186.47– 186.80	300.09– 300.63	—	West 73rd Street	
Cuyahoga	Cleveland	187.41– 187.49	301.61– 301.74	—	West 45th Street	Eastbound exit and entrance
Cuyahoga	Cleveland	187.39– 187.51	301.57– 301.77	193	West 49th Street	Westbound exit and entrance; exit numbered only on westbound side
Cuyahoga	Cleveland	187.84	302.30	—	SR 2 east to I-90	Eastern terminus of SR 2 concurrency (continues east on the Shoreway)
Cuyahoga	Cleveland	188.11	302.73		US 6 Alt. west (Detroit Avenue) to SR 2 east / US 42 south (West 25th Street) / SR 3 south	Western concurrency of US 42 and SR 3 concurrencies; eastern concurrency of US 6 Alt.
Cuyahoga	Cleveland	188.18– 188.71	302.85– 303.70	Detroit-Superior Bridge over the Cuyahoga River		
Cuyahoga	Cleveland	188.98– 189.13	304.13– 304.38		US 6 east / US 322 east (Superior Avenue) / US 422 east / SR 8 south / SR 14 east / SR 43 south / SR 87 east (Ontario Street)	Public Square; eastern terminus of US 6 / US 42 concurrency; termini of US 42, US 322, US 422, SR 3, SR 8, SR 14, SR 43, SR 87
Cuyahoga	Cleveland	193.14	310.83		SR 10 (East 105th Street / Opportunity Corridor)	
Cuyahoga	Cleveland	193.32– 193.38	311.12– 311.21		US 322 west (Chester Avenue) / Stearns Road / Martin Luther King Jr. Drive	Western terminus of US 322 concurrency
Cuyahoga	Cleveland	193.80	311.89		US 322 east (Mayfield Road) / Ford Drive	Eastern terminus of US 322 concurrency
Cuyahoga	East Cleveland	195.09	313.97		US 6 west (Superior Avenue) / Superior Road	Western terminus of US 6 concurrency
Cuyahoga	Euclid	196.93	316.93		US 6 east / SR 84 east (Chardon Road)	Eastern terminus of US 6 concurrency; unsigned western terminus of SR 84
Cuyahoga	Euclid	201.54	324.35		SR 175 (Richmond Road)	
Cuyahoga–Lake county line	Euclid–Wickliffe city line	202.40– 202.66	325.73– 326.15		I-90 to I-271 south / SR 2 – Erie, PA, Columbus, Cleveland, Painesville	Exit 186 on I-90
Lake	Wickliffe	203.36	327.28		SR 633 north (Lloyd Road) to SR 2	Southern terminus of SR 633
Lake	Willoughby	205.69	331.03		SR 91 (SOM Center Road)	
Lake	Willoughby	207.81	334.44		SR 174 south (River Street) / Spaulding Street	Western terminus of unsigned SR 174 concurrency
Lake	Willoughby	207.97	334.70		SR 640 west (Vine Street) / Erie Street	Eastern terminus of SR 640; unsigned northern terminus of SR 174
Lake	Mentor	209.75	337.56		SR 306 (Reynolds Road)	
Lake	Mentor	211.92	341.05		SR 615 (Center Street) to I-90	
Lake	Painesville	216.76	348.84		To SR 44 / SR 2 / Fern Drive	Southbound exit and northbound entrance from SR 44; ramps connect to US 20 via Fern Drive
Lake	Painesville	218.38	351.45		SR 283 / LECT west (Richmond Street)	Eastern terminus of SR 283
Lake	Painesville	218.73	352.01		SR 86 east (State Street)	Western terminus of SR 86
Lake	Painesville Township	220.85	355.42		SR 535 west to SR 2	Eastern terminus of SR 535
Lake	Painesville Township	222.04	357.34		SR 2 west (Lakeland Freeway)	Westbound exit and eastbound entrance; eastern terminus of SR 2
Lake	Madison Township	230.46	370.89		SR 528 south (Hubbard Road)	Northern terminus of SR 528
Ashtabula	Geneva	235.80	379.48		SR 534 / LECT (Broadway)	
Ashtabula	Saybrook Township	241.03	387.90		SR 45 (Center Road) to I-90 – Austinburg	
Ashtabula	Ashtabula Township	246.55– 246.63	396.78– 396.91		SR 11 to Eureka Road / I-90 / SR 531 – Youngstown	Exit 97 on SR 11
Ashtabula	North Kingsville	250.88	403.75		SR 193 (Main Street)	
Ashtabula	Conneaut	258.27	415.65		SR 7 south (Mill Street) to I-90	Western terminus of SR 7 concurrency
Ashtabula	Conneaut	258.49	416.00		SR 7 north (Broad Street) / LECT	Eastern terminus of SR 7 concurrency
Ashtabula	Conneaut	260.54	419.30		US 20 east / LECT east / Great Lakes Seaway Trail – Erie	Continuation into Pennsylvania
1.000 mi = 1.609 km; 1.000 km = 0.621 mi: Concurrency terminus; Incomplete access; Unopened

U.S. Route 20
Previous state: Indiana	Ohio	Next state: Pennsylvania
