= Ohio State Route 53 =

State highway in Ohio, US

State Route 53

Route information
- Maintained by ODOT
- Length: 92.75 mi (149.27 km)

Major junctions
- South end: US 68 / SR 67 in Kenton
- US 23 / US 30 in Upper Sandusky; I-80 / I-90 / Ohio Turnpike near Fremont; SR 2 in Ottawa County
- North end: Catawba Island, near Port Clinton

Location
- Country: United States
- State: Ohio
- Counties: Hardin, Wyandot, Seneca, Sandusky, Ottawa

Highway system
- Ohio State Highway System; Interstate; US; State; Scenic
← SR 52	→ SR 54

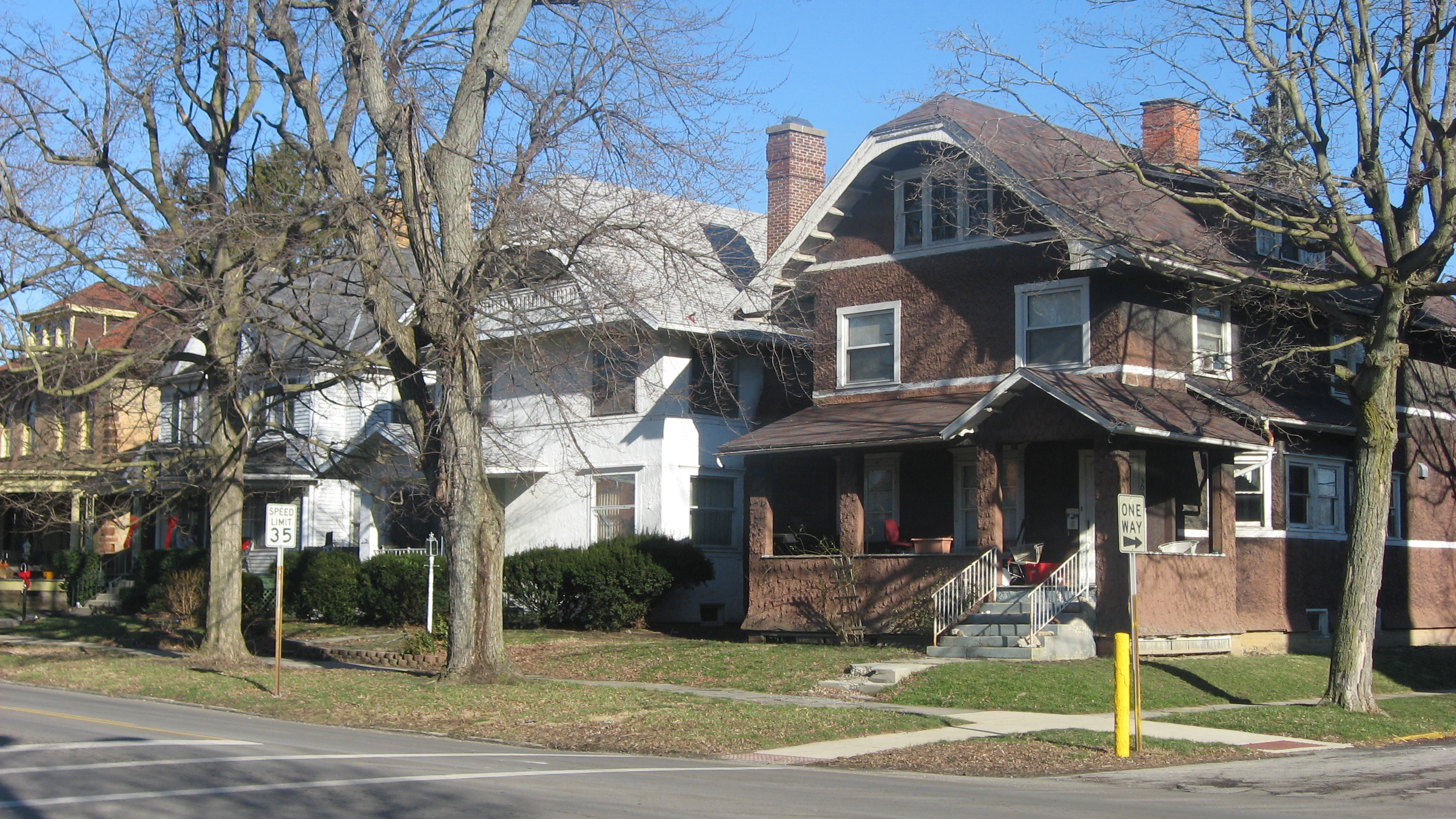
Houses lining the highway in Kenton.

State Route 53 is a north–south state highway in the U.S. state of Ohio (physically northeast-southwest). Its southern terminus is at the beginning of the U.S. 68/S.R. 67 concurrency in Kenton, Ohio, and its northern terminus is on Catawba Island in Ottawa County, north of Port Clinton.

== Route description ==
From Kenton, State Route 53 moves northeast to Forest, then continues eastward to Upper Sandusky. It then moves north through the small towns of Tymochtee and McCutchenville before entering Tiffin. The route then moves due north to Fremont, where it joins a four-route bypass around the city with U.S. Routes 6 and 20 and State Route 19. From its northern bypass interchange, it continues on a northeast heading, following the northern coastline of Sandusky Bay to Port Clinton, where it joins State Route 2 on a bypass around that city. From its eastern bypass interchange, State Route 53 heads north onto Catawba Island.

== History ==
State Route 53 was an original state highway which stretched from the Ohio River at Higginsport to Port Clinton. The route followed that of current State Route 221 to Georgetown, then followed the route currently followed by U.S. Route 68 to Kenton, then along its current route into Port Clinton. The route entered Port Clinton and truncated at State Route 163.

Before the Fremont bypass was certified, State Route 53 was routed along the Sandusky River through Old Fort into Fremont.

In 1929, State Route 53 was routed through the town of St. Martin, a town it originally bypassed. This reroute was reversed in 1931 and is now State Route 251.

In 1933, State Route 53's southern terminus was moved to Kenton when U.S. Route 68 was certified.

In 1946, State Route 53's northern terminus was extended to Catawba Island. It shared a route with State Route 163 for approximately five miles, then split north to the island. This route was formerly the southern portion of State Route 357.

In 1969, State Route 53 was routed along the State Route 2 bypass with an interchange approximately 2 miles (3.2 km) south of its split with State Route 163.

== Major junctions ==
County	Location	mi	km	Exit	Destinations	Notes
Hardin	Kenton	0.00	0.00		US 68 (Fontaine Street / South Detroit Street) / SR 67 (Espy Street)	
Hardin	Kenton	0.10	0.16		SR 31 south (Main Street) / Espy Street	Southern end of SR 31 concurrency
Hardin	Kenton	0.48	0.77		SR 309 (Franklin Street)	
Hardin	Kenton	0.55	0.89		SR 67 (Columbus Street)	
Hardin	Kenton	0.63	1.01		SR 31 north (Carroll Street)	Northern end of SR 31 concurrency
Hardin	Patterson	10.78	17.35		SR 81 west (Main Street)	Eastern terminus of SR 81
Hardin	Forest	12.39	19.94		SR 37 north (Lima Street)	Southern end of SR 37 concurrency
Wyandot	Jackson Township	13.73	22.10		SR 37 south / Township Highway 84 – Marseilles	Northern end of SR 37 concurrency
Wyandot	Jackson–Mifflin township line	17.30	27.84		SR 293 north / CR 95 – Kirby	Southern terminus of SR 293
Wyandot	Upper Sandusky	25.36	40.81		SR 67 south (Marseilles Avenue) / Spring Street	Southern end of SR 67 concurrency
Wyandot	Upper Sandusky	26.01	41.86		SR 199 north (Wyandot Avenue) / 8th Street	Southern end of SR 199 concurrency
Wyandot	Upper Sandusky	26.17	42.12		SR 199 south (Sandusky Avenue) / Wyandot Avenue	Northern end of SR 199 concurrency
Wyandot	Upper Sandusky–Crane Township municipal line	28.20– 28.38	45.38– 45.67		US 23 / US 30	Interchange
Wyandot	Upper Sandusky–Crane Township municipal line	28.54	45.93		SR 67 north / CR 47 – Sycamore	Northern end of SR 67 concurrency
Wyandot	Tymochtee Township	34.04	54.78		SR 103 west – Carey	Southern end of SR 103 concurrency
Wyandot	Tymochtee Township	34.59	55.67		SR 103 east – Sycamore	Northern end of SR 103 concurrency
Wyandot	Tymochtee Township	37.63	60.56		SR 587 north / CR 35 (Perry Street) – New Riegel	Southern terminus of SR 587
Seneca	Hopewell Township	45.61	73.40		US 224 – Attica, Finlay, Seneca County Airport	
Seneca	Tiffin	47.00	75.64		SR 18 east / SR 101 east (West Market Street)	
Seneca	Tiffin	47.11	75.82		SR 18 west (West Perry Street) / SR 101 west	Western terminus of SR 101
Seneca	Tiffin	47.96	77.18		SR 100 south (North Washington Street)	Northern terminus of SR 100
Sandusky	Ballville Township	59.55	95.84		SR 12 west / CR 201 (Hurdic Road) – Bettsville, Fostoria	Eastern terminus of SR 12
Sandusky	Ballville–Sandusky township line	63.05	101.47		US 6 west / CR 6 (Hayes Avenue) – Helena, Bowling Green, Rutherford B. Hayes Presidential Center	Southern end of US 6 concurrency
Sandusky	Sandusky Township	64.67– 65.12	104.08– 104.80	98	US 20 west / CR 20 (West State Street) – Fremont, Perrysburg	Interchange; southern end of US 20 concurrency
Sandusky	Sandusky Township			Southern end of freeway		
Sandusky	Fremont	66.23– 66.38	106.59– 106.83	100	SR 19 north (Oak Harbor Road) – Oak Harbor	Southern end of SR 19 concurrency
Sandusky	Fremont	66.88– 67.92	107.63– 109.31	101	US 6 east / US 20 east / SR 19 south – Norwalk	Northern end of US 6 / US 20 / SR 19 concurrencies
Sandusky	Fremont			Northern end of freeway		
Sandusky	Rice Township	70.07– 70.21	112.77– 112.99		I-80 / I-90 / Ohio Turnpike – Toledo, Cleveland	Exit 91 (Ohio Turnpike)
Sandusky	Rice Township	73.70	118.61		SR 523 west / Marsh Road	Eastern terminus of SR 523
Ottawa	Bay Township	80.01– 80.27	128.76– 129.18	117	SR 2 / LECT west (Fremont Road) / CR 52 – Toledo	Southern end of SR 2 concurrency
Ottawa	Bay Township			Southern end of freeway		
Ottawa	Portage Township	83.81– 84.30	134.88– 135.67	121A–B	SR 2C to SR 163 – Port Clinton, Catawba Island	
Ottawa	Portage Township	86.19– 86.69	138.71– 139.51	124	SR 2 / LECT east – Sandusky, Cleveland	Northern end of SR 2 concurrency
Ottawa	Portage Township			Northern end of freeway		
Ottawa	Portage Township	87.82	141.33		SR 163 – Port Clinton, Lakeside, Marblehead	
Ottawa	Catawba Island Township	92.75	149.27		East Water Street / Miller Boat Line – South Bass Island	
1.000 mi = 1.609 km; 1.000 km = 0.621 mi: Concurrency terminus; Tolled
