= Kingsway, Ohio =

Coordinates: 41°25′03″N 83°08′08″W

Kingsway is an unincorporated community in Rice Township, Sandusky County, Ohio, United States.

== History ==
A post office called Kingsway was established in 1882, and remained in operation until 1911. The community was named for George W. King, first postmaster.
