= Chatfield, Ohio =

- Village
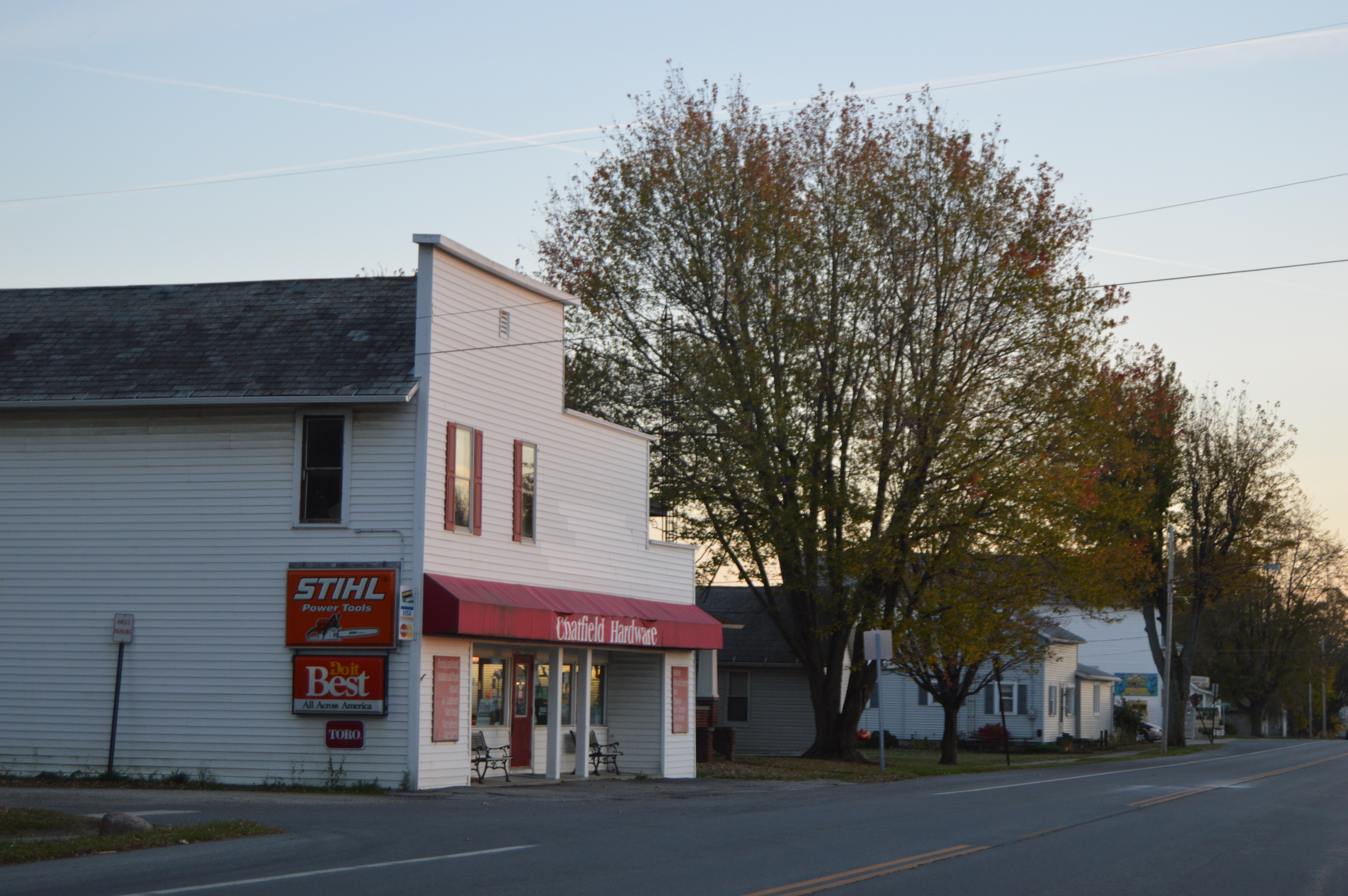
- Sandusky Avenue at Fourth Street

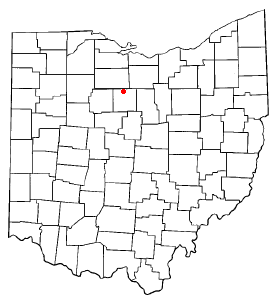
- Location of Chatfield, Ohio

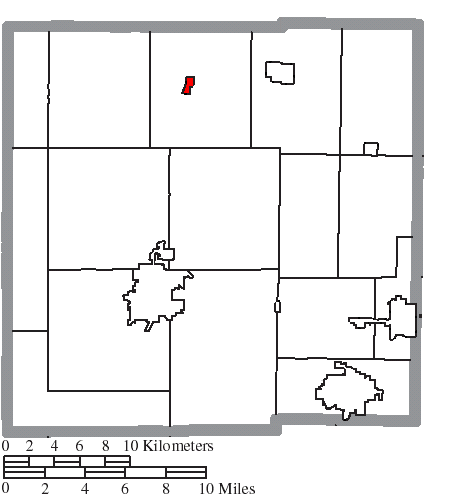
- Location of Chatfield in Crawford County
- Coordinates: 40°57′04″N 82°56′31″W
- Country: United States
- State: Ohio
- County: Crawford
- Township: Chatfield

Area
  - Total: 0.29 sq mi (0.76 km^{2})
  - Land: 0.29 sq mi (0.76 km^{2})
  - Water: 0 sq mi (0.00 km^{2})
- Elevation: 978 ft (298 m)

Population (2020)
  - Total: 205
  - Estimate (2023): 200
  - Density: 695.7/sq mi (268.61/km^{2})
- Time zone: UTC-5 (Eastern (EST))
  - Summer (DST): UTC-4 (EDT)
- ZIP code: 44825
- Area code: 419
- FIPS code: 39-13694
- GNIS feature ID: 2397605

Chatfield is a village in Crawford County, Ohio, United States. The population was 205 at the 2020 census.

== Geography ==
According to the United States Census Bureau, the village has a total area of 0.30 square miles (0.78 km^{2}), all land.

== Demographics ==
Historical population
Census	Pop.	Note	%±
1900	298		—
1910	270		−9.4%
1920	239		−11.5%
1930	236		−1.3%
1940	216		−8.5%
1950	204		−5.6%
1960	263		28.9%
1970	291		10.6%
1980	228		−21.6%
1990	206		−9.6%
2000	218		5.8%
2010	189		−13.3%
2020	205		8.5%
2023 (est.)	200	▼	−2.4%
U.S. Decennial Census

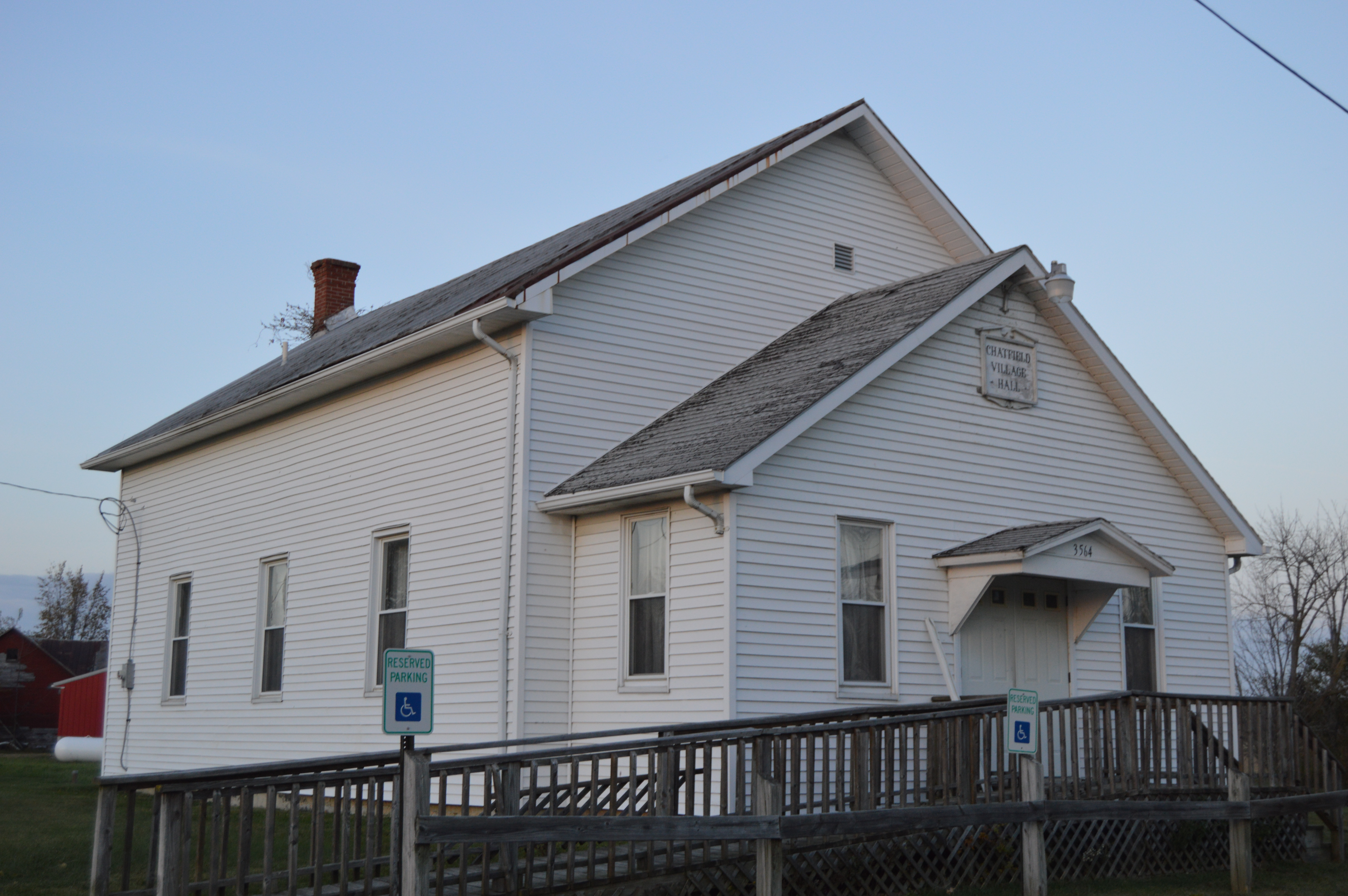
Chatfield Village Hall

=== 2010 census ===
As of the census of 2010, there were 189 people, 75 households, and 56 families living in the village. The population density was 630.0 inhabitants per square mile (243.2/km^{2}). There were 87 housing units at an average density of 290.0 per square mile (112.0/km^{2}). The racial makeup of the village was 97.4% White, 0.5% Native American, and 2.1% from two or more races. Hispanic or Latino of any race were 1.6% of the population.

There were 75 households, of which 33.3% had children under the age of 18 living with them, 64.0% were married couples living together, 8.0% had a female householder with no husband present, 2.7% had a male householder with no wife present, and 25.3% were non-families. 24.0% of all households were made up of individuals, and 10.7% had someone living alone who was 65 years of age or older. The average household size was 2.52 and the average family size was 2.91.

The median age in the village was 42.1 years. 23.8% of residents were under the age of 18; 6.3% were between the ages of 18 and 24; 23.2% were from 25 to 44; 33.4% were from 45 to 64; and 13.2% were 65 years of age or older. The gender makeup of the village was 50.3% male and 49.7% female.

=== 2000 census ===
As of the census of 2000, there were 218 people, 86 households, and 57 families living in the village. The population density was 734.1 inhabitants per square mile (283.4/km^{2}). There were 90 housing units at an average density of 303.1 per square mile (117.0/km^{2}). The racial makeup of the village was 100.00% White. Hispanic or Latino of any race were 2.75% of the population.

There were 86 households, out of which 32.6% had children under the age of 18 living with them, 59.3% were married couples living together, 7.0% had a female householder with no husband present, and 32.6% were non-families. 29.1% of all households were made up of individuals, and 14.0% had someone living alone who was 65 years of age or older. The average household size was 2.53 and the average family size was 3.16.

In the village, the population was spread out, with 27.5% under the age of 18, 6.0% from 18 to 24, 34.9% from 25 to 44, 21.1% from 45 to 64, and 10.6% who were 65 years of age or older. The median age was 37 years. For every 100 females there were 101.9 males. For every 100 females age 18 and over, there were 90.4 males.

The median income for a household in the village was $37,188, and the median income for a family was $46,250. Males had a median income of $30,417 versus $21,563 for females. The per capita income for the village was $13,847. About 1.7% of families and 5.4% of the population were below the poverty line, including 6.4% of those under the age of eighteen and none of those 65 or over.
