= Ohio State Route 4 =

State highway in Ohio, US

State Route 4
- SR 4 in red, SR 4 Bypass in blue, former SR 4 in Dayton in grey

Route information
- Maintained by ODOT
- Length: 207.22 mi (333.49 km)
- Existed: 1912–present

Major junctions
- South end: US 42 in Cincinnati
- I-75 in Cincinnati; I-275 in Springdale; I-75 / US 35 in Dayton; I-70 / I-675 in Huber Heights; US 40 in Springfield; US 33 / US 36 in Marysville; US 23 near Marion; US 30 in Bucyrus; US 20 / SR 18 near Bellevue; I-80 / I-90 / Ohio Turnpike near Sandusky; SR 2 near Sandusky
- North end: US 6 / SR 101 in Sandusky

Location
- Country: United States
- State: Ohio
- Counties: Hamilton, Butler, Montgomery, Greene, Clark, Champaign, Union, Delaware, Marion, Crawford, Seneca, Huron, Erie

Highway system
- Ohio State Highway System; Interstate; US; State; Scenic
← SR 3	→ SR 5
← US 52	→ SR 53

State Route 4 (SR 4), formerly known as Inter-county Highway 4 until 1921 and State Highway 4 in 1922, is a major north–south state highway in Ohio. It is the fifth longest state route in Ohio. Its southern terminus is at U.S. Route 42 in Cincinnati, Ohio, and its northern terminus is at U.S. Route 6 in Sandusky, Ohio. Its path is nearly ruler-straight for many miles. Some portions of the route are still marked as Dixie Highway. The northern portion was constructed by the Columbus and Sandusky Turnpike Company, see Turnpike Lands.

== Route description ==
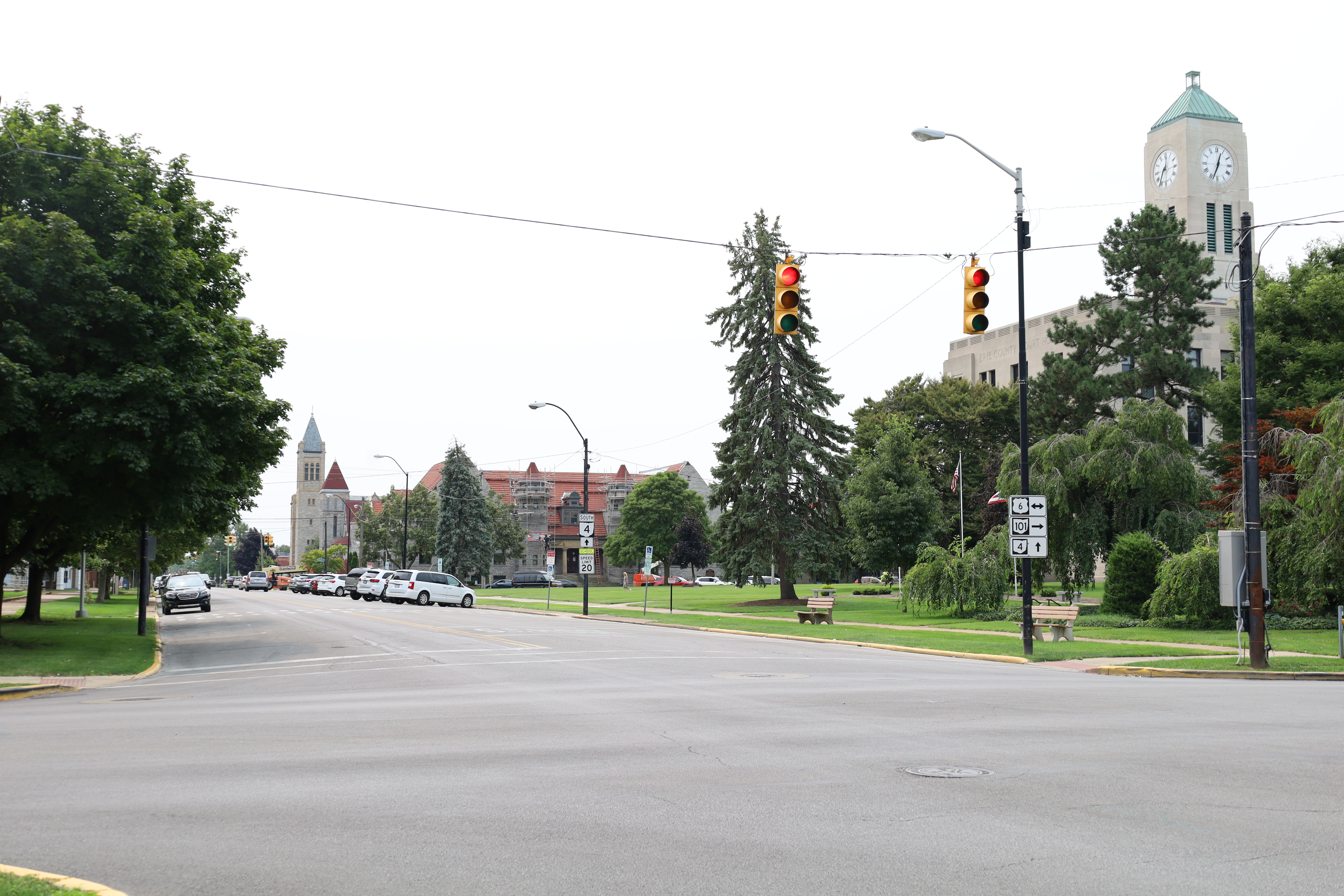
Northern terminus of SR 4 in Sandusky, Ohio in 2023, with the Erie County Courthouse visible at right

The portion from Cincinnati to Dayton primarily consists of arterial roads. State Route 4 begins at an intersection with U.S. Route 42 in the North Avondale neighborhood of Cincinnati. Initially called Paddock Road, it runs concurrently with Vine Street in northern Cincinnati, and then Springfield Pike as it passes through suburban northern Hamilton County. Upon crossing into Butler County, it curves to the west to pass near the downtowns of Fairfield and Hamilton, while Route 4 Bypass takes a more direct route.

The portion of SR 4 between High Street (SR 129) and North Fair Avenue in Hamilton is designated as the "Firefighter/Paramedic Patrick Wolterman Memorial Highway", in honor of a firefighter/paramedic for that city who died December 28, 2015, while battling an intentionally-set house fire. The two men who started the blaze were convicted of murder and arson in November 2017 and sentenced to life in prison. This portion of SR 4 passes by Wolterman's fire station.

From Hamilton to Dayton, the road roughly follows the Great Miami River. It turns northeast to run through downtown Middletown, and then crosses the river. Shortly after entering Dayton, it becomes concurrent with the U.S. Route 35 freeway and then Interstate 75. Route 4 then splits off as a freeway paralleling the Mad River. It then joins Interstate 70, with which it runs concurrently for over three miles. The route splits as a freeway again, until it becomes a one-way pair of surface streets in downtown Springfield.

North of Springfield, the route is primarily a two-lane rural highway until its end in Sandusky. It travels through downtown Mechanicsburg and Milford Center, but bypasses downtown Marysville. It then travels through the downtowns of Marion and Bucyrus, crossing the St. Lawrence River Divide in the latter. It finally heads northeast to Sandusky, where it ends.

== History ==
In 1912 the Route ran from Sandusky to Columbus. In 1924 the Route extended south from Columbus on former SH 5, following current US 23 alignment from Portsmouth to Waldo, and current SR 423 from Waldo to Marion. In 1926, alignment from Portsmouth to Marion certified as US 23; SR 4 realigned south of Marion to its current southern terminus in Cincinnati, replacing the former SR 6 from Cincinnati to Middletown, the former SR 52 from Middletown to 3 miles (4.8 km) south of Milford Center, and the former SR 38 from Marysville to Marion.

In 1959 alignment from Dayton to Springfield rerouted and upgraded to freeway; segment through Fairborn around Wright-Patterson Air Force Base designated as SR 444. In 1967 the segment from SR 201 to SR 444 upgraded to freeway. In 2011 the Dayton segment was rerouted via I-75. In 2021 the Dayton segment rerouted from Germantown Pike to Gettysburg Avenue interchange with US 35.

== Future ==
=== Huber Heights safety improvements ===
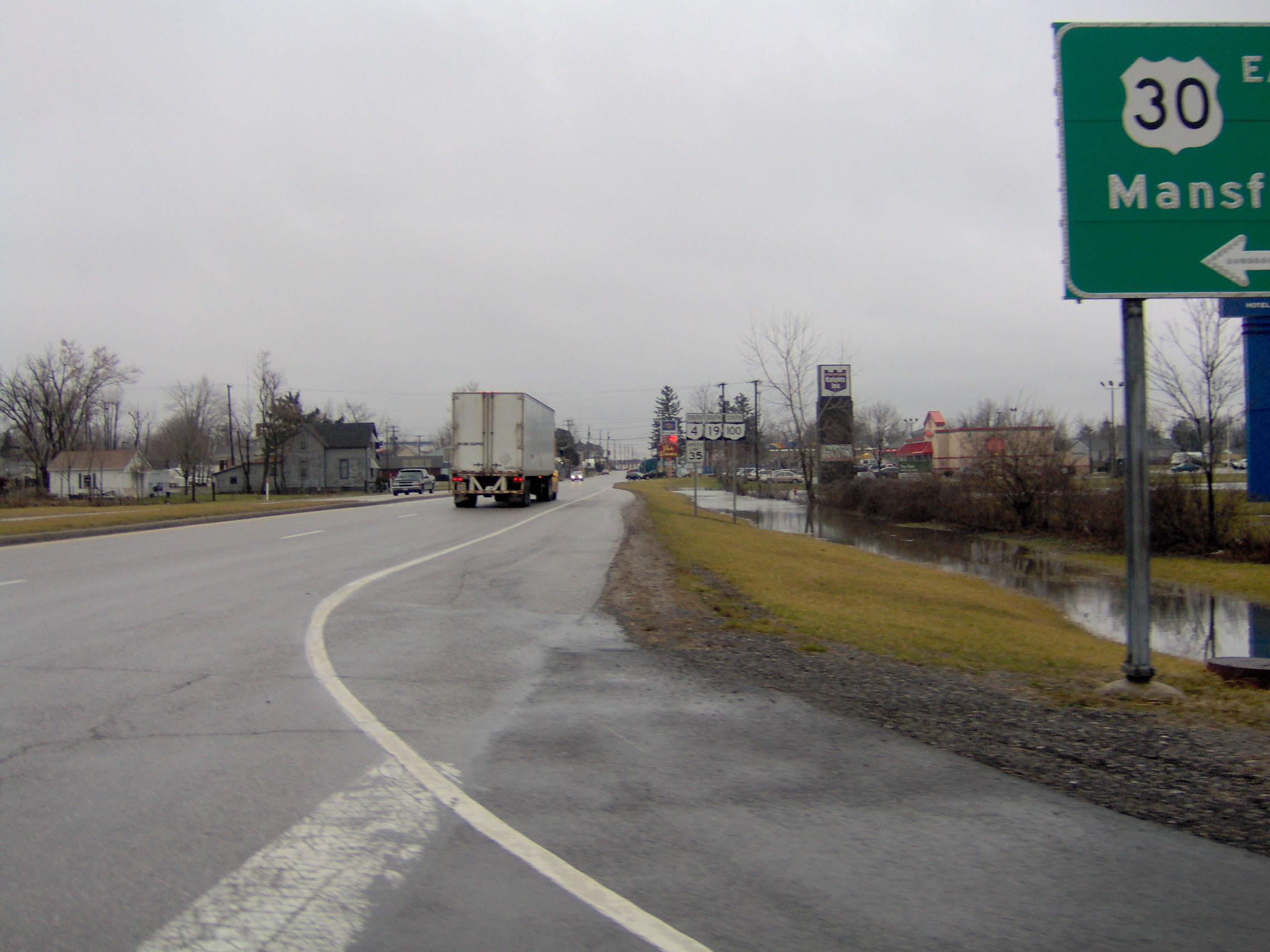
State Route 4 concurrent with State Routes 19 and 100 near Bucyrus

The intersection of SR 4 and New Carlisle Pike/Lower Valley Pike in Huber Heights, between SR 235/Chambersburg Road and Interstate 70, has had at least 15 accidents between 2012 and August 2018, resulting in three fatalities and 20 injuries. The intersection, which is uncontrolled, is along a high-speed portion of SR 4 that is near-expressway in character; additionally, the median is not wide enough to allow longer vehicles such as tractor-trailers to wait there safely before making a left turn (north) from New Carlisle Pike onto SR 4. Fixes for the problem intersection, all rejected, included adding lights and signage; closing the intersection; adding a traffic light; constructing a roundabout; adding an overpass; requiring traffic from New Carlisle Pike to northbound SR 4 to instead travel southbound to the SR 235/Chambersburg Road interchange, exit and re-enter northbound; and rerouting New Carlisle Pike to Chambersburg Road. At the August 6, 2018 Huber Heights city council meeting, an engineering firm hired by the city, working in conjunction with the Ohio Department of Transportation (ODOT), proposed two alternatives. The first, a restricted crossing U-turn (RCUT) (also known as a superstreet), would prohibit left turns from New Carlisle Pike or Lower Valley Pike, and cross-traffic between the two; those movements would be accomplished via right turns onto SR 4, followed by designated median U-turns. Left turns from SR 4 to New Carlisle Pike and Lower Valley Pike would still be permitted. This alternative has an estimated cost of $1 million, with ODOT paying 80% of the cost and the city paying 20%. The second alternative, sometimes called a "basic RCUT", is similar to the first alternative, but would additionally prohibit left turns from SR 4 to New Carlisle Pike and Lower Valley Pike; those movements would be accomplished via median U-turns, followed by right turns. This alternative's estimated cost is $701,000, using the same 80%/20% cost split. A superstreet already exists along the SR 4 Bypass in nearby Butler County.

== Major intersections ==
County	Location	mi	km	Exit	Destinations	Notes
Hamilton	Cincinnati	0.00	0.00		US 42 (Reading Road)	
Hamilton	Cincinnati	1.20	1.93		SR 562 (Norwood Lateral Expressway)	SR 562 exit 1
Hamilton	Cincinnati	2.49	4.01		SR 561 east (E. Seymour Avenue)	
Hamilton	Cincinnati	2.66	4.28		I-75 (Mill Creek Expressway) – Dayton	I-75 exit 9
Hamilton	Glendale	7.54	12.13		SR 747 north (Congress Avenue)	
Hamilton	Springdale	9.94	16.00		I-275 – Dayton, Indianapolis	I-275 exit 41
Butler	Fairfield	12.41	19.97		SR 4 Byp. north / Ross Road	Southern end of bypass route
Butler	Hamilton	18.46	29.71		SR 129 (High Street)	
Butler	Fairfield Township	21.24	34.18		SR 4 Byp. south	Northern end of bypass route
Butler	Liberty Township	24.31	39.12		SR 747 south – Springdale	
Butler	Lemon Township	26.13	42.05	—	SR 63 east – Monroe, Lebanon	Interchange
Butler	Lemon Township	28.71	46.20	—	SR 73 west – Trenton, Oxford	Southern end of SR 73 overlap
Butler	Middletown	31.19	50.20		SR 122 west (Second Avenue)	Southern end of SR 122 overlap
Butler	Middletown	31.25	50.29		SR 122 east (First Avenue)	Northern end of SR 122 overlap
Butler	Middletown	32.75	52.71		SR 73 east (N. Verity Parkway)	Northern end of SR 73 overlap
Montgomery	German Township	38.99	62.75		SR 123 south – Carlisle, Franklin	
Montgomery	Germantown	39.93	64.26		SR 725 west – Germantown, Gratis	Southern end of SR 725 overlap
Montgomery	Germantown	41.48	66.76		SR 725 east – Miamisburg	Northern end of SR 725 overlap
Montgomery	Dayton	49.84	80.21	—	US 35 west – Eaton	Interchange; southern end of US 35 overlap
Montgomery	Dayton	51.56	82.98	—	James H. McGee Boulevard	
Montgomery	Dayton	52.63	84.70	52	I-75 south / US 35 east – Xenia, Cincinnati	Northern end of US 35 overlap; southern end of I-75 overlap; SR 4 north merges onto I-75 north; exit 52 on I-75
Montgomery	Dayton	53.13– 53.48	85.50– 86.07	53	Third Street / Second Street / Salem Avenue / First Street	
Montgomery	Dayton	54.34	87.45	54A	SR 48 (Main Street) / Grand Avenue	
Montgomery	Dayton	54.29– 54.93	87.37– 88.40	54B	I-75 north – Toledo	Northern end of I-75 overlap; SR 4 north departs I-75 north; SR 4 south merges onto I-75 south; exit 54B on I-75
Montgomery	Dayton	54.97	88.47	—	Webster Street / Keowee Street north	Northbound exit and southbound entrance only
Montgomery	Dayton	55.21	88.85	—	Keowee Street south	Southbound exit and northbound entrance only
Montgomery	Dayton	55.45– 55.53	89.24– 89.37	—	SR 201 (Valley Street) / SR 202 (Troy Street)	
Montgomery	Dayton	56.38	90.73	—	Stanley Avenue / Findlay Street	
Montgomery	Dayton	58.46	94.08	—	Harshman Road	
Montgomery	Dayton	59.95	96.48	—	SR 444 north / Valley Street – Fairborn	
Montgomery	Huber Heights	64.04	103.06	—	SR 235 south (Chambersburg Road)	Southern end of SR 235 overlap
Montgomery	Huber Heights	65.40	105.25	41	I-70 west / SR 235 north – New Carlisle, Indianapolis	Northern end of SR 235 overlap; southern end of I-70 overlap; SR 4 north merges onto I-70 east; roadway continues as SR 235 north; exit 41 on I-70
Clark	Mad River Township	68.51	110.26	44	I-675 south / Spangler Road – Medway, Cincinnati	Northern end of I-675; I-675 exit 26
Clark	Mad River Township	70.86	114.04	47	I-70 east – Columbus	Northern end of I-70 overlap; exit 47 eastbound and exit 48 westbound (via Enon Road) on I-70
Clark	Bethel Township	72.30	116.36	7	Enon, Donnelsville	
Clark	Bethel Township	73.99	119.08	9	SR 369 north (Lower Valley Pike)	
Clark	Springfield Township	76.43	123.00	-	Lower Valley Pike	Southbound exit and northbound entrance only
Clark	Springfield Township	76.74	123.50	-	US 40 west – Donnelsville	Southbound exit and northbound entrance only
Clark	Springfield Township	77.16	124.18	-	US 68 – Xenia, Urbana	Interchange
Clark	Springfield	79.19	127.44		SR 41 north to SR 72 (Yellow Springs Road)	Southern end of SR 41 overlap
Clark	Springfield	79.86	128.52		SR 72 (Spring Street)	No access from northbound lanes
Clark	Springfield	80.15	128.99		US 40 east / SR 41 south	Northern end of US 40 and SR 41 overlaps
Clark	Moorefield Township	85.06	136.89		SR 334 west	Eastern end of SR 334
Champaign	Union Township	91.61	147.43		SR 54 – Catawba, Urbana	
Champaign	Union Township	94.55	152.16		SR 56	
Champaign	Mechanicsburg	97.72	157.27		SR 29 / SR 559 north (Main Street)	
Champaign	Goshen Township	101.69	163.65		SR 161 west	Southern end of SR 161 overlap
Union	Union Township	103.12	165.96		SR 161 east – Plain City	Northern end of SR 161 overlap
Union	Union Township	105.06	169.08		US 36 west – Urbana	Southern end of US 36 overlap
Union	Paris Township	112.95	181.78		US 33 west – Bellefontaine	Southern end of US 33 overlap
Union	Paris Township	113.29	182.32	—	SR 245 west	Eastern end of SR 245
Union	Marysville	114.85	184.83	—	SR 31 – Kenton	
Union	Paris Township	115.34	185.62		US 33 east / US 36 east – Delaware, Columbus	Northern end of US 33 and US 36 overlaps
Union	Leesburg Township	122.84	197.69		SR 347 – Raymond, Delaware	
Union	Leesburg Township	125.77	202.41		SR 37 east – Magnetic Springs	Southern end of SR 37 overlap
Union	Claibourne Township	126.73	203.95		SR 37 west – Richwood	Northern end of SR 37 overlap
Delaware	Thompson Township	130.67	210.29		SR 47 west – Richwood	Southern end of SR 47 overlap
Marion	Gast Corner	131.34	211.37		SR 47 east – Prospect	Northern end of SR 47 overlap
Marion	Prospect–Pleasant township line	134.23	216.02		SR 203 – Prospect	
Marion	Marion	141.50	227.72		SR 4 south / SR 423 south (S. Prospect Street)	Directional split begins; northbound traffic follows State Street to Patten Street
Marion	Marion	141.69	228.03		SR 423 south	Southern end of SR 423 overlap
Marion	Marion	142.06	228.62		SR 739 north	Eastern end of SR 739; one-way couplet
Marion	Marion	142.24	228.91		SR 95 east / SR 309 east (Church Street)	One-way couplet
Marion	Marion	142.33	229.06		SR 95 west / SR 309 west / SR 739 south (Center Street)	One-way couplet
Marion	Marion	143.09	230.28		SR 4 south / SR 423 south (Klerx Avenue)	Directional split ends; southbound traffic follows Klerx Avenue to Prospect Street
Marion	Bellaire Gardens	144.54	232.61		SR 423 north	Northern end of SR 423 overlap
Marion	Grand Prairie Township	147.85	237.94		US 23 – Upper Sandusky, Delaware	
Crawford	Dallas Township	152.82	245.94		SR 294 – Monnett, Wyandot	
Crawford	Bucyrus	159.65	256.93		SR 98 south (S. Sandusky Avenue)	Southern end of SR 98 overlap
Crawford	Bucyrus	160.52	258.33		SR 19 south / SR 100 south (E. Perry Street)	Southern end of SR 19 and SR 100 overlaps
Crawford	Bucyrus	160.72	258.65		SR 98 north (Plymouth Street)	Northern end of SR 98 overlap
Crawford	Holmes Township–Bucyrus municipal line	161.52	259.94		US 30 – Upper Sandusky, Mansfield	
Crawford	Holmes Township–Bucyrus municipal line	162.07	260.83		SR 19 north / SR 100 north	Northern end of SR 19 and SR 100 overlaps
Crawford	Chatfield	170.22	273.94		SR 103 west – Sycamore	Southern end of SR 103 overlap
Crawford	Chatfield Township	171.29	275.66		SR 103 east – New Washington	Northern end of SR 103 overlap
Seneca	Attica	178.65	287.51		US 224 (Tiffin Street) – Tiffin, Akron, Mogadore	
Seneca	Reed Township	183.01	294.53		SR 162 – Republic, North Fairfield	
Seneca–Huron county line	Thompson–Sherman township line	186.64	300.37		SR 269 north – Bellevue	
Huron	Sherman Township	188.70	303.68		SR 547 – Monroeville	
Huron	Lyme Township	193.30	311.09		US 20 / SR 18 – Bellevue, Norwalk	
Huron	Lyme Township	194.66	313.27		SR 113 – Bellevue, Huron	
Erie	Groton Township	198.76	319.87		I-80 / I-90 / Ohio Turnpike – Cleveland, Toledo	Turnpike exit 110
Erie	Groton Township	199.67	321.34		SR 99 south – Monroeville	
Erie	Perkins Township	203.42	327.37		SR 2 – Cleveland, Toledo	Exit 134 on SR 2
Erie	Sandusky	207.22	333.49		US 6 / SR 101 west / LECT (Washington Street)	Northern end of SR 4 and eastern end of SR 101
1.000 mi = 1.609 km; 1.000 km = 0.621 mi: Concurrency terminus; Incomplete access

== State Route 4 Bypass ==
State Route 4 Bypass
- Location: Hamilton, Ohio
- Existed: 1971–present

Map of SR 4 By-Pass

State Route 4 By-Pass (SR 4B or SR 4 Bypass, known locally as Bypass 4) is a 5.97-mile-long (9.61 km) north–south state highway through Butler County in the western part of the state. The route runs from SR 4 in Fairfield to SR 4 in Fairfield Township north of the Hamilton city limits.

SR 4B begins at a single-quadrant roadway intersection with SR 4 (Dixie Highway) and Ross Road in eastern Fairfield. Here, the connector road is located in the northwest quadrant of the intersection. The route travels north as a divided four-lane road first crossing over a CSX railroad and intersecting Port Union Road. The next three intersections SR 4B has (from south to north: Symmes Road, Tylersville Road, and Hamilton–Mason Road) are superstreet intersections. The roadway briefly expands to three lanes in each direction between Symmes Road and Tylersville Road as it crosses over a Norfolk Southern railroad. This segment also features the Fairfield-Hamilton city boundary. After the Hamilton–Mason Road intersection, SR 4B comes to a diamond interchange with SR 129 (Butler County Veterans Highway). North of Princeton Road, the route shrinks to an undivided two-lane road, passes under an overpass carrying Millikin Road, and ends at a signalized intersection with SR 4. The entirety of SR 4B is included as a part of the National Highway System.

SR 4B was constructed in the early 1970s by ODOT to allow for easier travel between Cincinnati and Middletown. In the 1990s, the Butler County Transportation Improvement District (BCTID) was formed to help address traffic congestion along the fully two-lane bypass route. Construction started on the widening of SR 4B in 2010 which included the widening of the road from the southern terminus to SR 129, the widening of three bridges, and the creation of three superstreet and one quadrant roadway intersections. The superstreet intersections were completed in 2011. Construction of the expanded roadway finished in August 2012 on time and on budget, at a cost of $22.8 million. The BCTID is continuing to study the option of widening SR 4B north of SR 129.

SR 4B is the first superstreet corridor in Ohio. As of April 2013, it was reported that the majority of motorists in the area did not approve of the new design, with some avoiding SR 4B entirely.

=== Major junctions ===
The entire route is in Butler County.

Location	mi	km	Destinations	Notes
Fairfield	0.00	0.00	SR 4 (Dixie Highway) / Ross Road	Single-quadrant roadway intersection
Fairfield Township	4.35	7.00	SR 129 (Butler County Veterans Highway) to I-75 – Dayton, Cincinnati, Hamilton	Interchange
Fairfield Township	5.97	9.61	SR 4 (Hamilton–Middletown Road) / Indian Meadows Drive – Hamilton, Middletown	
1.000 mi = 1.609 km; 1.000 km = 0.621 mi
