= Rice Township, Sandusky County, Ohio =

Township in Ohio, US

- Township
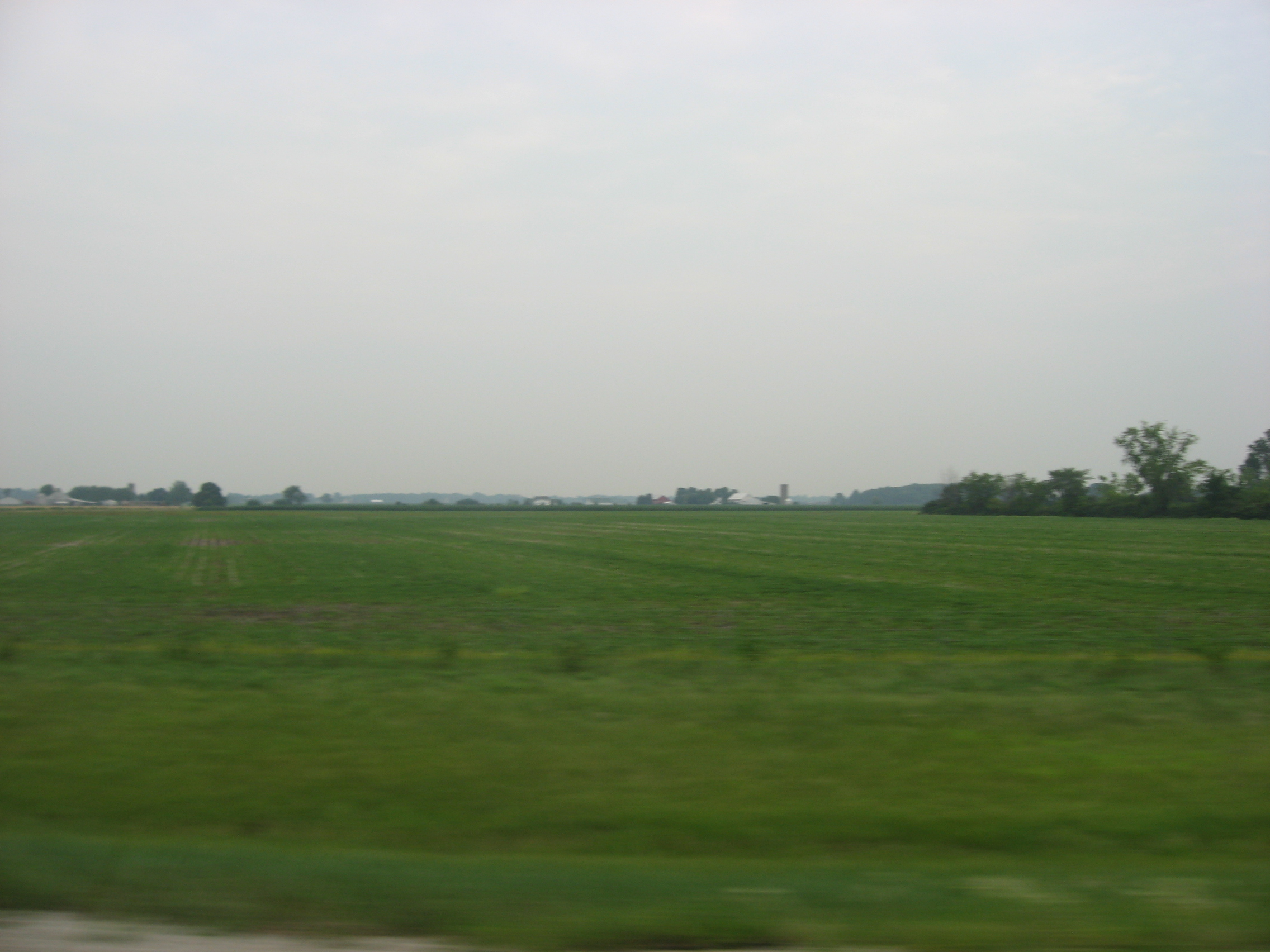
- Broad farm fields in southwestern Rice Township

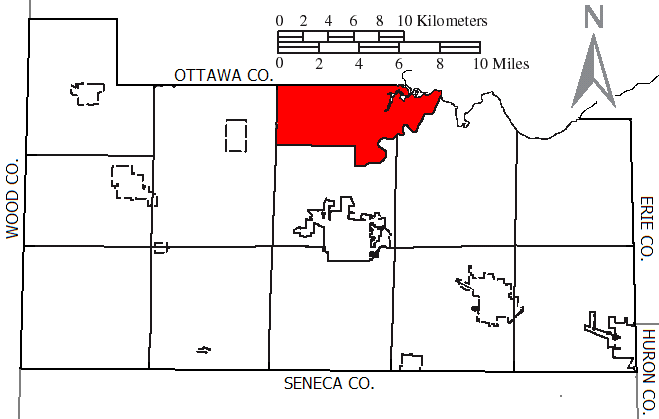
- Location of Rice Township, Sandusky County, Ohio
- Coordinates: 41°26′15″N 83°6′49″W
- Country: United States
- State: Ohio
- County: Sandusky

Area
  - Total: 23.2 sq mi (60.0 km^{2})
  - Land: 21.6 sq mi (55.9 km^{2})
  - Water: 1.6 sq mi (4.1 km^{2})
- Elevation: 590 ft (180 m)

Population (2020)
  - Total: 1,143
  - Density: 53/sq mi (20.4/km^{2})
- Time zone: UTC-5 (Eastern (EST))
  - Summer (DST): UTC-4 (EDT)
- FIPS code: 39-66460
- GNIS feature ID: 1086914
- Website: https://ricetownship.com/

Rice Township is one of the twelve townships of Sandusky County, Ohio, United States. As of the 2020 census, 1,143 people lived in the township.

== Geography ==
Located in the northern part of the county along Sandusky Bay, it borders the following townships:

- Salem Township, Ottawa County - north
- Bay Township, Ottawa County - northeast, across Sandusky Bay
- Riley Township - southeast
- Sandusky Township - south
- Washington Township - west
- Harris Township, Ottawa County - northwest corner

No municipalities are located in Rice Township, but it does contain the unincorporated community of Kingsway.

== Name and history ==
Rice Township was established in 1840. It was named for Judge Ezekiel Rice, a pioneer settler.

It is the only Rice Township statewide.

== Government ==
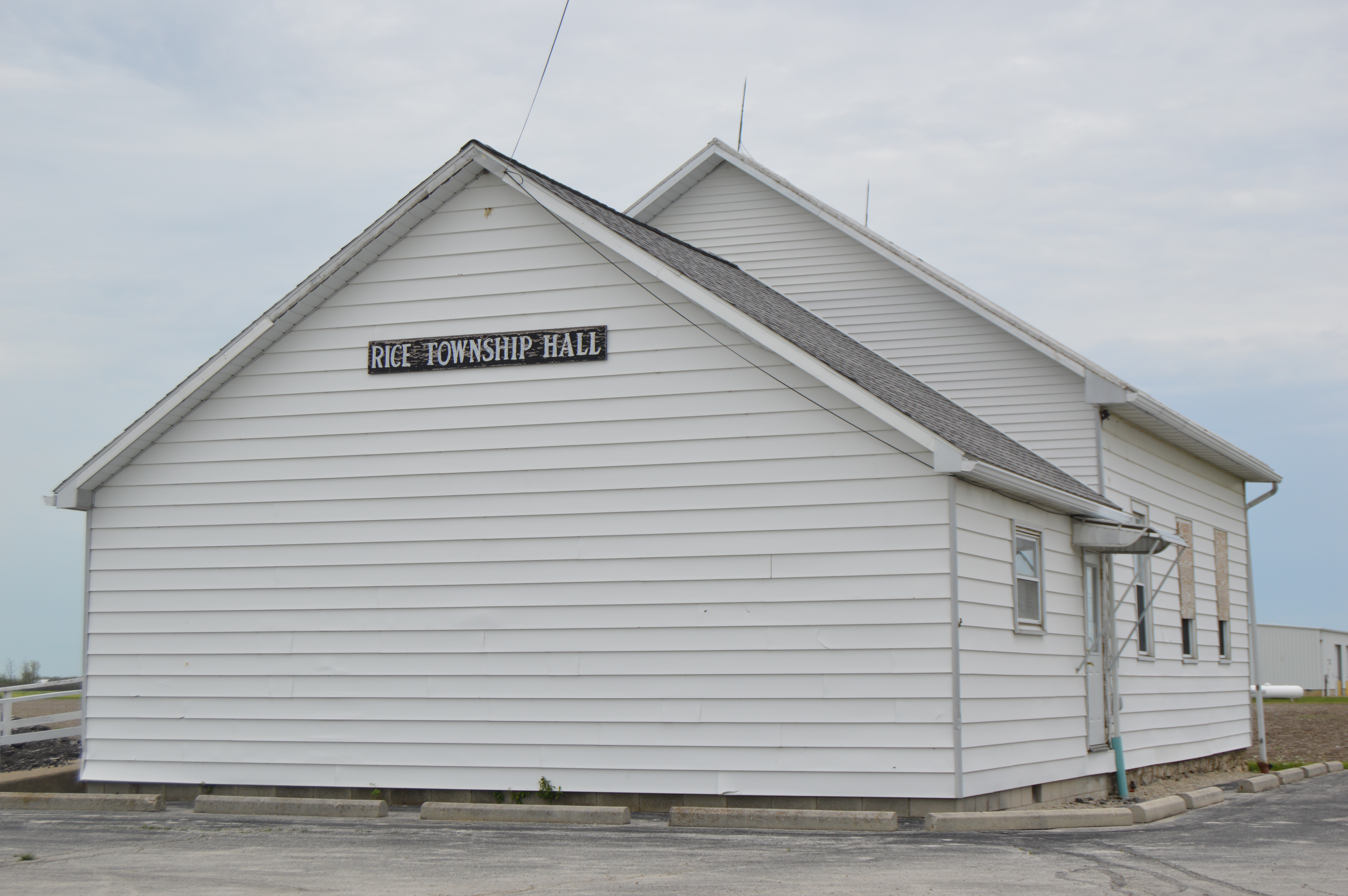
Township hall

The township is governed by a three-member board of trustees, who are elected in November of odd-numbered years to a four-year term beginning on the following January 1. Two are elected in the year after the presidential election and one is elected in the year before it. There is also an elected township fiscal officer, who serves a four-year term beginning on April 1 of the year after the election, which is held in November of the year before the presidential election. Vacancies in the fiscal officership or on the board of trustees are filled by the remaining trustees.
