= Castalia, Ohio =

- Village
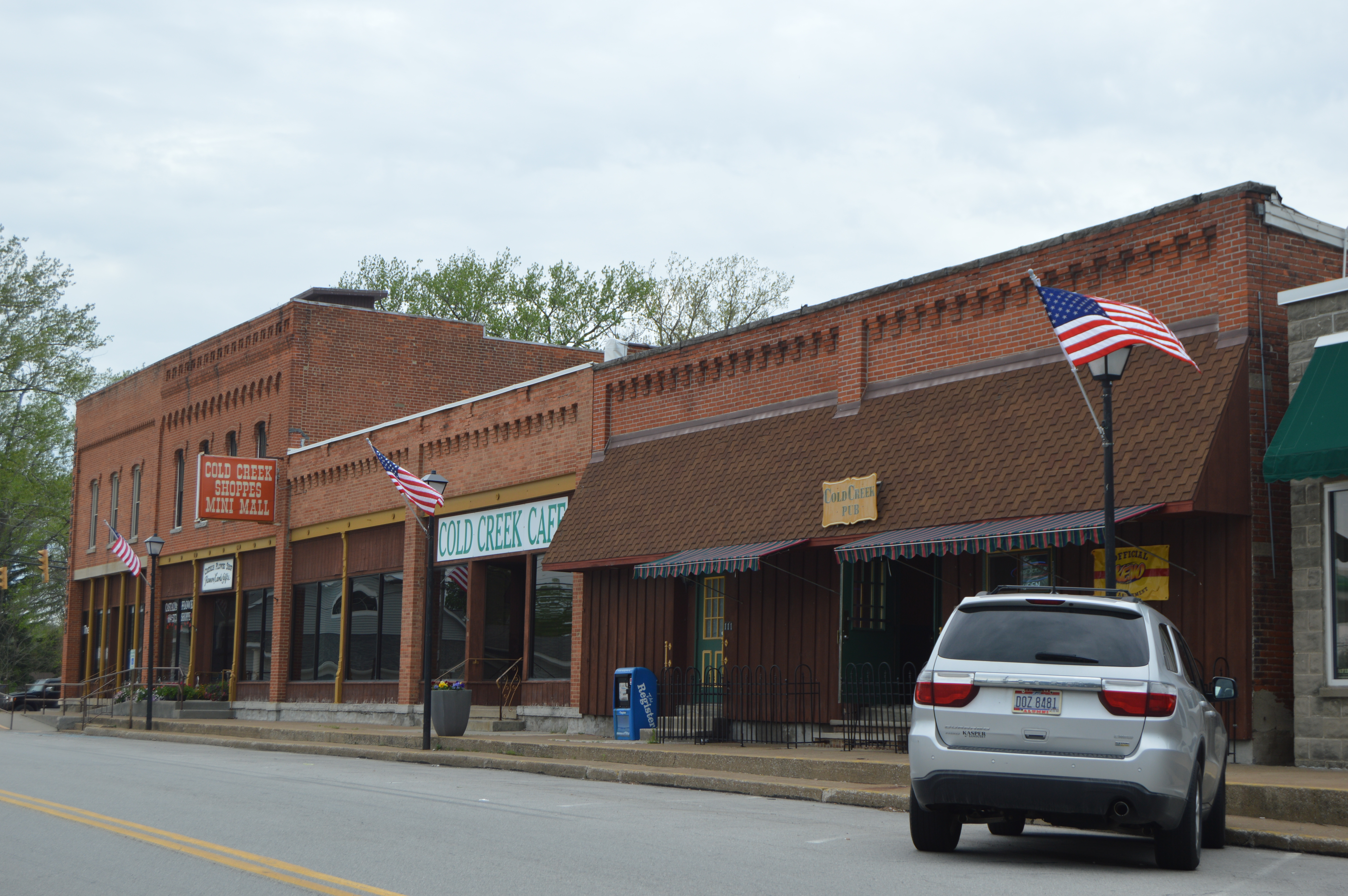
- Main Street

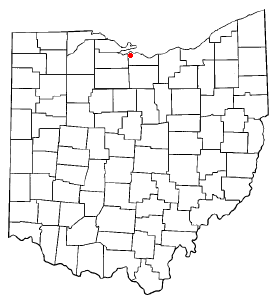
- Location of Castalia, Ohio

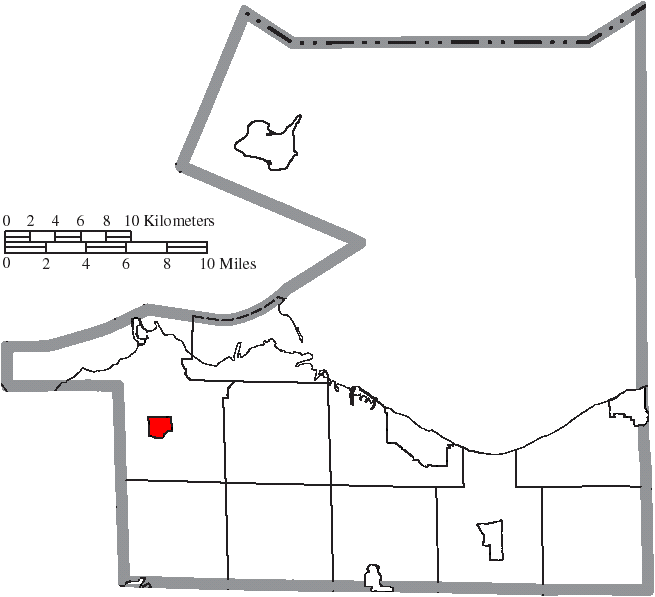
- Location of Castalia in Erie County
- Coordinates: 41°24′04″N 82°48′29″W
- Country: United States
- State: Ohio
- County: Erie
- Township: Margaretta

Government
  - Mayor: James R. Johnson

Area
  - Total: 1.03 sq mi (2.67 km^{2})
  - Land: 1.02 sq mi (2.65 km^{2})
  - Water: 0.0077 sq mi (0.02 km^{2})
- Elevation: 633 ft (193 m)

Population (2020)
  - Total: 774
  - Estimate (2023): 747
  - Density: 757.2/sq mi (292.35/km^{2})
- Time zone: UTC-5 (Eastern (EST))
  - Summer (DST): UTC-4 (EDT)
- ZIP code: 44824
- Area code: 419
- FIPS code: 39-12476
- GNIS feature ID: 2397573
- Website: https://www.villageofcastalia.com

Castalia (/kæsˈteɪljə/ kass-TAYL-yə) is a village in Erie County, Ohio, United States. The population was 774 at the 2020 census. It is part of the Sandusky, Ohio Metropolitan Statistical Area.

== History ==
By 1738 there was a Wyandot settlement at what is now Castalia under the leadership of Nicholas Orontony. Due to growing disputes with the French and closer trade relations with Pennsylvania-based merchants, the Wyandot burned their village and relocated to the mouth of the Cuyahoga River in what is today Cleveland in 1748.

Castalia was laid out in 1836. The village was named after Castalia, a figure in Greek mythology.

== Geography ==
Castalia is located in western Erie County.

According to the United States Census Bureau, the village has a total area of 1.05 square miles (2.72 km^{2}), of which 1.04 square miles (2.69 km^{2}) is land and 0.01 square miles (0.03 km^{2}) is water.

== Demographics ==
Historical population
Census	Pop.	Note	%±
1880	117		—
1950	736		—
1960	954		29.6%
1970	1,045		9.5%
1980	973		−6.9%
1990	915		−6.0%
2000	935		2.2%
2010	852		−8.9%
2020	774		−9.2%
2023 (est.)	747	▼	−3.5%
U.S. Decennial Census

=== 2010 census ===
As of the census of 2010, there were 852 people, 352 households, and 239 families residing in the village. The population density was 819.2 inhabitants per square mile (316.3/km^{2}). There were 378 housing units at an average density of 363.5 per square mile (140.3/km^{2}). The racial makeup of the village was 97.1% White, 0.1% African American, 0.4% Native American, 0.1% Asian, 0.7% from other races, and 1.6% from two or more races. Hispanic or Latino of any race were 3.3% of the population.

There were 352 households, of which 30.4% had children under the age of 18 living with them, 51.4% were married couples living together, 12.2% had a female householder with no husband present, 4.3% had a male householder with no wife present, and 32.1% were non-families. 27.8% of all households were made up of individuals, and 11.6% had someone living alone who was 65 years of age or older. The average household size was 2.42 and the average family size was 2.97.

The median age in the village was 40.5 years. 23.1% of residents were under the age of 18; 7.2% were between the ages of 18 and 24; 26.7% were from 25 to 44; 29.6% were from 45 to 64; and 13.3% were 65 years of age or older. The gender makeup of the village was 49.1% male and 50.9% female.

=== 2000 census ===
As of the census of 2000, there were 935 people, 359 households, and 266 families residing in the village. The population density was 895.6 inhabitants per square mile (345.8/km^{2}). There were 380 housing units at an average density of 364.0 per square mile (140.5/km^{2}). The racial makeup of the village was 97.11% White, 0.96% African American, 0.43% Native American, 0.64% from other races, and 0.86% from two or more races. Hispanic or Latino of any race were 3.32% of the population. 96.8% spoke English and 3.1% Spanish.

There were 359 households, out of which 36.5% had children under the age of 18 living with them, 57.1% were married couples living together, 11.4% had a female householder with no husband present, and 25.9% were non-families. 24.0% of all households were made up of individuals, and 11.4% had someone living alone who was 65 years of age or older. The average household size was 2.60 and the average family size was 3.09.

In the village, the population was spread out, with 27.2% under the age of 18, 7.6% from 18 to 24, 28.7% from 25 to 44, 23.4% from 45 to 64, and 13.2% who were 65 years of age or older. The median age was 37 years. For every 100 females there were 92.0 males. For every 100 females age 18 and over, there were 91.8 males.

The median income for a household in the village was $41,319, and the median income for a family was $51,563. Males had a median income of $36,625 versus $24,783 for females. The per capita income for the village was $17,277. About 4.0% of families and 6.1% of the population were below the poverty line, including 6.3% of those under age 18 and 7.1% of those age 65 or over.

== Notable person ==
- Carrie Chase Davis (1863–1953), physician, suffragist
