= Ohio State Route 590 =

State highway in northwestern Ohio, US

State Route 590

Route information
- Maintained by ODOT
- Length: 25.17 mi (40.51 km)
- Existed: 1937–present

Major junctions
- South end: SR 12 in Bettsville
- US 6 near Helena; US 20 near Lindsey
- North end: SR 2 near Rocky Ridge

Location
- Country: United States
- State: Ohio
- Counties: Seneca, Sandusky, Ottawa

Highway system
- Ohio State Highway System; Interstate; US; State; Scenic
← SR 589	→ SR 591

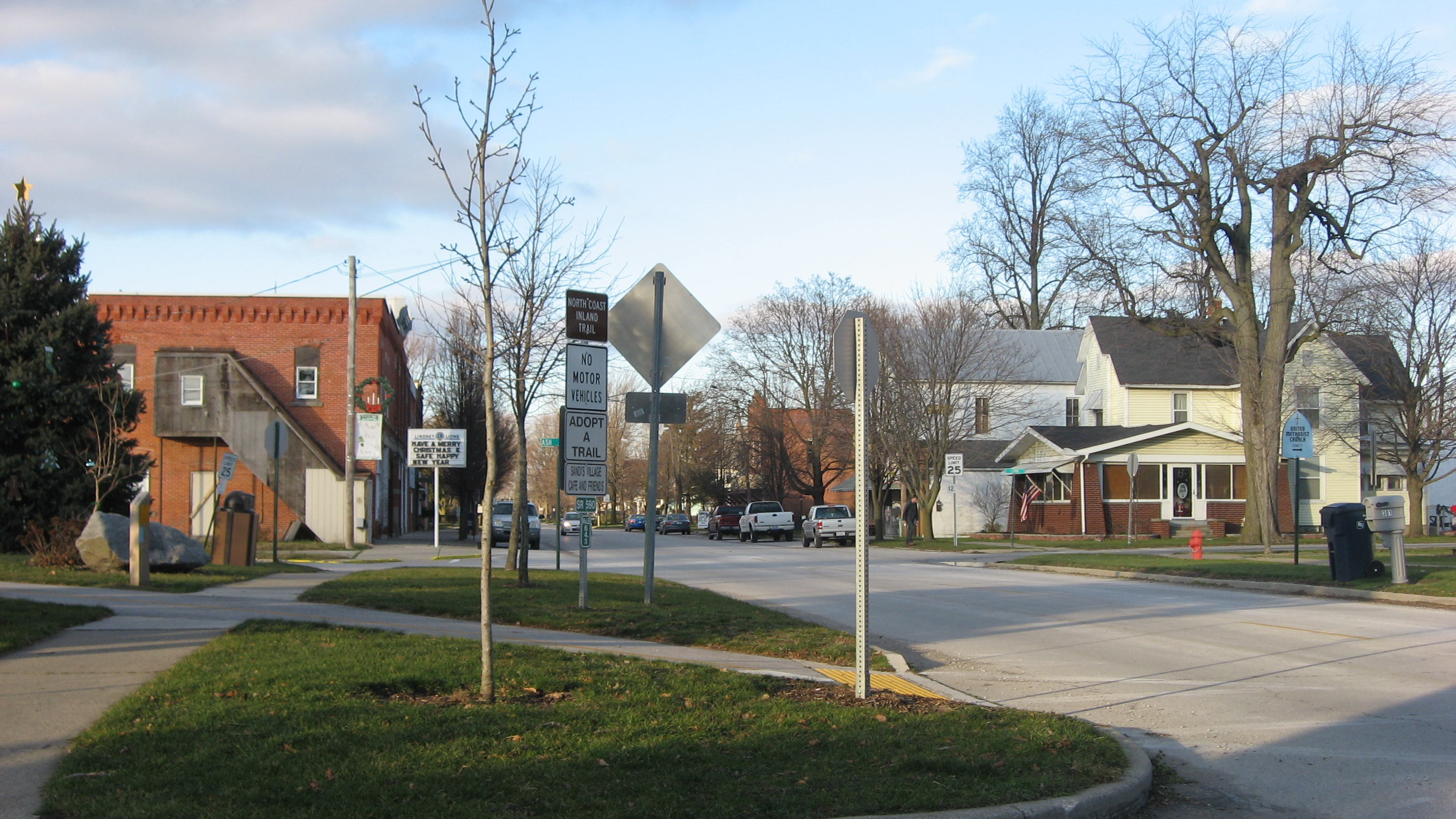
State Route 590 in the village of Lindsey

State Route 590 (SR 590) is a north–south state highway in the northwestern portion of the U.S. state of Ohio. The southern terminus of SR 590 is at a signalized intersection with SR 12 in the village of Bettsville. Its northern terminus is at a T-intersection with SR 2 just south of Ottawa National Wildlife Refuge, and approximately 5 miles (8.0 km) north of Rocky Ridge.

== Route description ==
Along its path, SR 590 travels through portions of Seneca, Sandusky and Ottawa Counties. No portion of the highway is included as a part of the National Highway System.

== History ==
SR 590 was created in 1937. Its original routing consisted of the following: the current SR 53 from its intersection with Seneca County Road 51 southwest of the unincorporated community of Old Fort to its intersection with Seneca CR 61; CR 61 from SR 53 to the current southern terminus of SR 590 at SR 12 in Bettsville; and the entirety of the current routing of SR 590. The portions of current SR 53 and CR 61 noted would only be designated as SR 590 for one year. In 1938, SR 590 was truncated to its current southern terminus at SR 12, and the portion east of Bettsville would become part of re-routing of SR 113.

== Major intersections ==
County	Location	mi	km	Destinations	Notes
Seneca	Bettsville	0.00	0.00	SR 12 (State Street) / Union Street	
Sandusky	Jackson Township	6.93	11.15	US 6 – Fremont, Bowling Green	
Sandusky	Washington Township	10.55	16.98	US 20	
Ottawa	Harris Township	17.52	28.20	SR 105 – Elmore, Woodville, Oak Harbor	
Ottawa	Harris–Benton township line	19.01	30.59	SR 163 – Genoa, Oak Harbor	
Ottawa	Benton Township	25.17	40.51	SR 2 / LECT – Oregon, Toledo, Port Clinton	
1.000 mi = 1.609 km; 1.000 km = 0.621 mi
