= Ohio State Route 163 =

State highway in northwestern Ohio, US

State Route 163

Route information
- Maintained by ODOT
- Length: 46.24 mi (74.42 km)
- Existed: 1923–present

Major junctions
- West end: US 20 / US 23 near Perrysburg
- East end: Hartshorn Road near Marblehead

Location
- Country: United States
- State: Ohio
- Counties: Wood, Ottawa

Highway system
- Ohio State Highway System; Interstate; US; State; Scenic
| ← SR 162 | → SR 164 |

State Route 163 (SR 163) is a 46.24-mile (74.42 km) long east–west state highway in the northwestern portion of the U.S. state of Ohio. The western terminus of SR 163 is at a T-intersection with the duplex of U.S. Route 20 (US 20) and US 23 approximately 6 miles (9.7 km) southeast of the city limits of Perrysburg. Its eastern terminus is at its intersection with Hartshorn Road nearly 2 miles (3.2 km) west of the village limits of Marblehead, on the peninsula formed by Lake Erie and Sandusky Bay.

== Route description ==
The path of SR 163 takes it through the northeastern portion of Wood County and the entire width of Ottawa County. No segment of this state route is included within the National Highway System.

== History ==
The SR 163 designation was applied in 1923. Originally, the highway ran along its present routing from its intersection with SR 51, at the time a part of SR 2 and later designated as the now-defunct SR 102, on the outskirts of Genoa, and its eastern terminus near Marblehead. SR 163 was extended west into Wood County along a previously un-numbered road from Genoa to its present western terminus at US 20 southeast of Perrysburg.

== Major intersections ==
| County | Location | mi | km | Destinations | Notes |
|---|---|---|---|---|---|
| Wood | Troy Township | 0.00 | 0.00 | US 20 / US 23 | Western terminus at T-intersection |
| Wood | Troy–Lake township line | 2.29 | 3.69 | SR 420 | |
| Ottawa | Clay Township | 8.90 | 14.32 | SR 51 | Signalized intersection |
| Ottawa | Harris–Benton township line | 14.83 | 23.87 | SR 590 | |
| Ottawa | Oak Harbor | 18.66 | 30.03 | SR 105 west | Western end of SR 105 concurrency |
| Ottawa | Oak Harbor | 19.10 | 30.74 | SR 19 / SR 105 end | Eastern end of SR 105 concurrency; eastern terminus of SR 105 |
| Ottawa | Erie Township | 25.69 | 41.34 | SR 358 north | Southern terminus of SR 358 |
| Ottawa | Erie Township | 26.73 | 43.02 | SR 2 east / LECT | Exit 115 (SR 2); access to eastbound SR 2 and from westbound SR 2 only |
| Ottawa | Port Clinton | 31.92 | 51.37 | To SR 2 / SR 53 / LECT | Exit 121 (SR 2) |
| Ottawa | Portage Township | 35.58 | 57.26 | SR 53 | |
| Ottawa | Danbury Township | 36.19 | 58.24 | SR 269 south | Western end of SR 269 concurrency |
| Ottawa | Danbury Township | 36.62 | 58.93 | SR 269 north | Eastern end of SR 269 concurrency |
| Ottawa | Danbury Township | 46.28 | 74.48 | Hartshorn Road | |
1.000 mi = 1.609 km; 1.000 km = 0.621 mi: Concurrency terminus; Incomplete access
