= Ohio State Route 105 =

State highway in northwestern Ohio, US

State Route 105

Route information
- Maintained by ODOT
- Length: 28.26 mi (45.48 km)
- Existed: 1923–present

Major junctions
- West end: I-75 / SR 64 in Bowling Green
- US 23 near Pemberville; US 20 in Woodville
- East end: SR 19 in Oak Harbor

Location
- Country: United States
- State: Ohio
- Counties: Wood, Sandusky, Ottawa

Highway system
- Ohio State Highway System; Interstate; US; State; Scenic
← SR 104	→ SR 106

State Route 105 (SR 105) is an east–west state highway in the northwestern portion of the U.S. state of Ohio. Its western terminus is at an interchange with Interstate 75 in Bowling Green that doubles as the southern terminus of State Route 64, and its eastern terminus is at State Route 19 in Oak Harbor. For its final 0.4 miles (0.64 km), the route overlaps State Route 163 which continues east.

== History ==
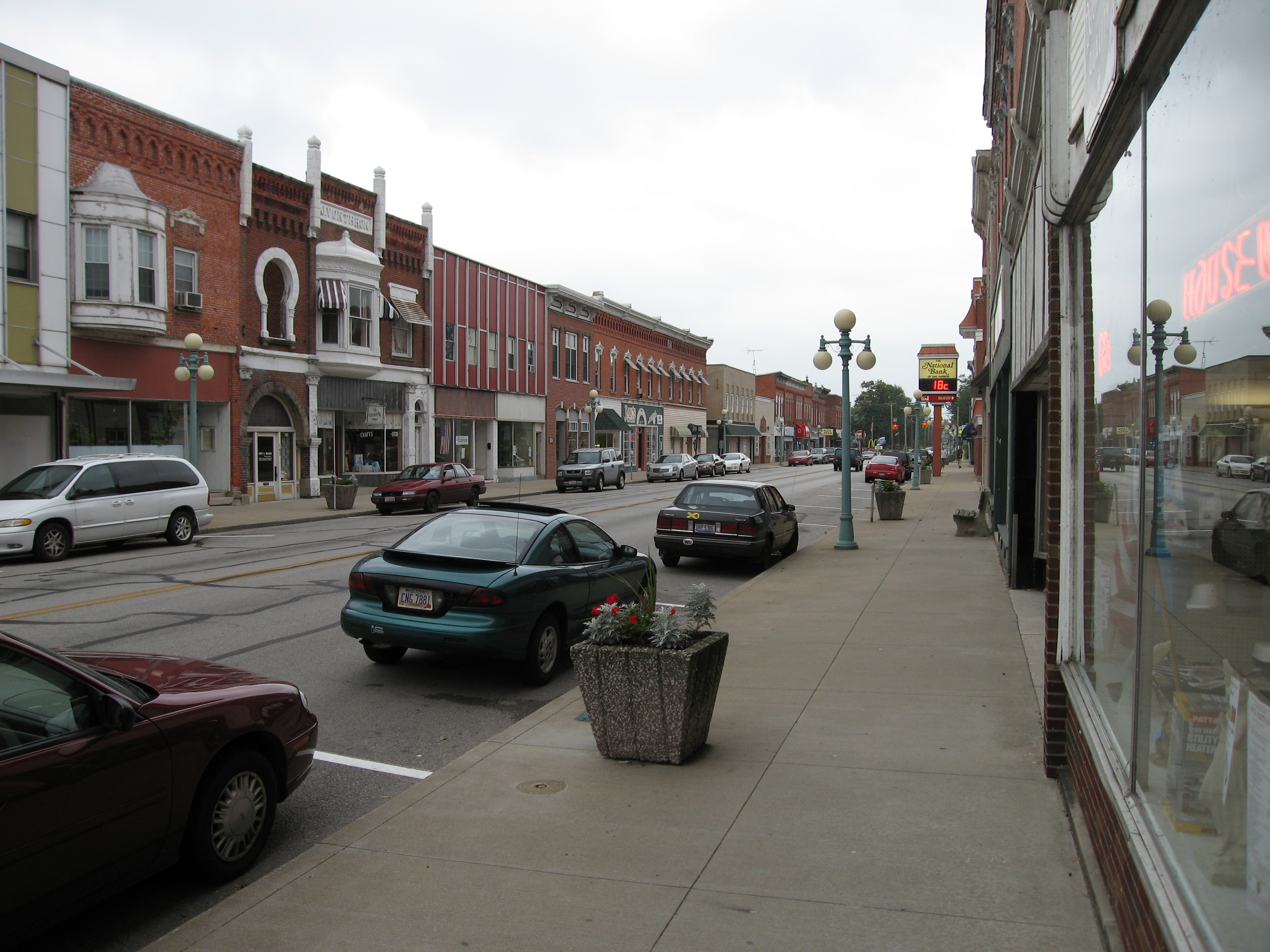
The eastern terminus of OH 105 is in Oak Harbor, where it intersects OH 19

SR 105 was commissioned in 1923, routed from 4 miles (6.4 km) east of Bowling Green to Oak Harbor along its current alignment. Its western terminus was at then SR 34, later became U.S. Route 6 (US 6). The entire route was paved by 1934. Between 1967 and 1969, it was extended west to current western terminus, along the former US 6 alignment.

== Major intersections ==
County	Location	mi	km	Destinations	Notes
Wood	Bowling Green	0.00	0.00	I-75 (East Wooster Street) / SR 64 north – Toledo, Dayton, Bowling Green	Exit 181 (I-75); southern terminus of SR 64
Wood	Scotch Ridge	5.83	9.38	SR 199	
Wood–Sandusky county line	Freedom–Woodville township line	12.11	19.49	US 23 – Fostoria, Toledo	
Sandusky	Woodville Township	14.46	23.27	SR 582 west	Eastern terminus of SR 582
Sandusky	Woodville	15.16	24.40	US 20 west (West Main Street) – Toledo	Western end of US 20 concurrency
Sandusky	Woodville	15.70	25.27	US 20 east (East Main Street) – Fremont	Eastern end of US 20 concurrency
Ottawa	Harris Township	19.88	31.99	SR 51 – Genoa, Toledo, Elmore	
Ottawa	Harris Township	24.11	38.80	SR 590 – Rocky Ridge, Lindsey	
Ottawa	Oak Harbor	27.82	44.77	SR 163 west (Benton Street)	Western end of SR 163 concurrency
Ottawa	Oak Harbor	28.26	45.48	SR 19 (Locust Street) / SR 163 east (Water Street)	Eastern end of SR 163 concurrency
1.000 mi = 1.609 km; 1.000 km = 0.621 mi: Concurrency terminus
