= Benton-Carroll-Salem Local School District =

School district in Ohio

Address
- 11685 West State Route 163 Oak Harbor, Ohio, 43449; United States
- Coordinates: 41°30′46″N 83°8′48″W

District information
- Type: Public
- Grades: KG–12
- Superintendent: Cathy Bergman
- Schools: 3
- NCES District ID: 3904892

Students and staff
- Students: 1,341 (2025–2026)
- Teachers: 90.34 (on an FTE basis) (2025–2026)
- Staff: 150.27 (on an FTE basis) (2025–2026)
- Student–teacher ratio: 14.84 (2025–2026)

Other information
- Website: www.bcssd.com

Benton-Carroll-Salem Local School District is a school district in Northwest Ohio. The school district provides open enrollment so that a student does not have to live in the district limits, however the school primarily serves students who live in the following villages and townships Oak Harbor, Rocky Ridge, Carroll Twp., Benton Twp., Erie Twp., and Salem Twp. located in Ottawa County. They have been ranked in the top 20% out of all 607 schools in Ohio.

== Schools ==
- Oak Harbor High School (Grades 7-12)
- Oak Harbor Intermediate School (Grades 4-6)
- R. C. Waters Elementary School (Grades K-3)
