= Bay Township, Ohio =

Township in Ohio, US

- Township
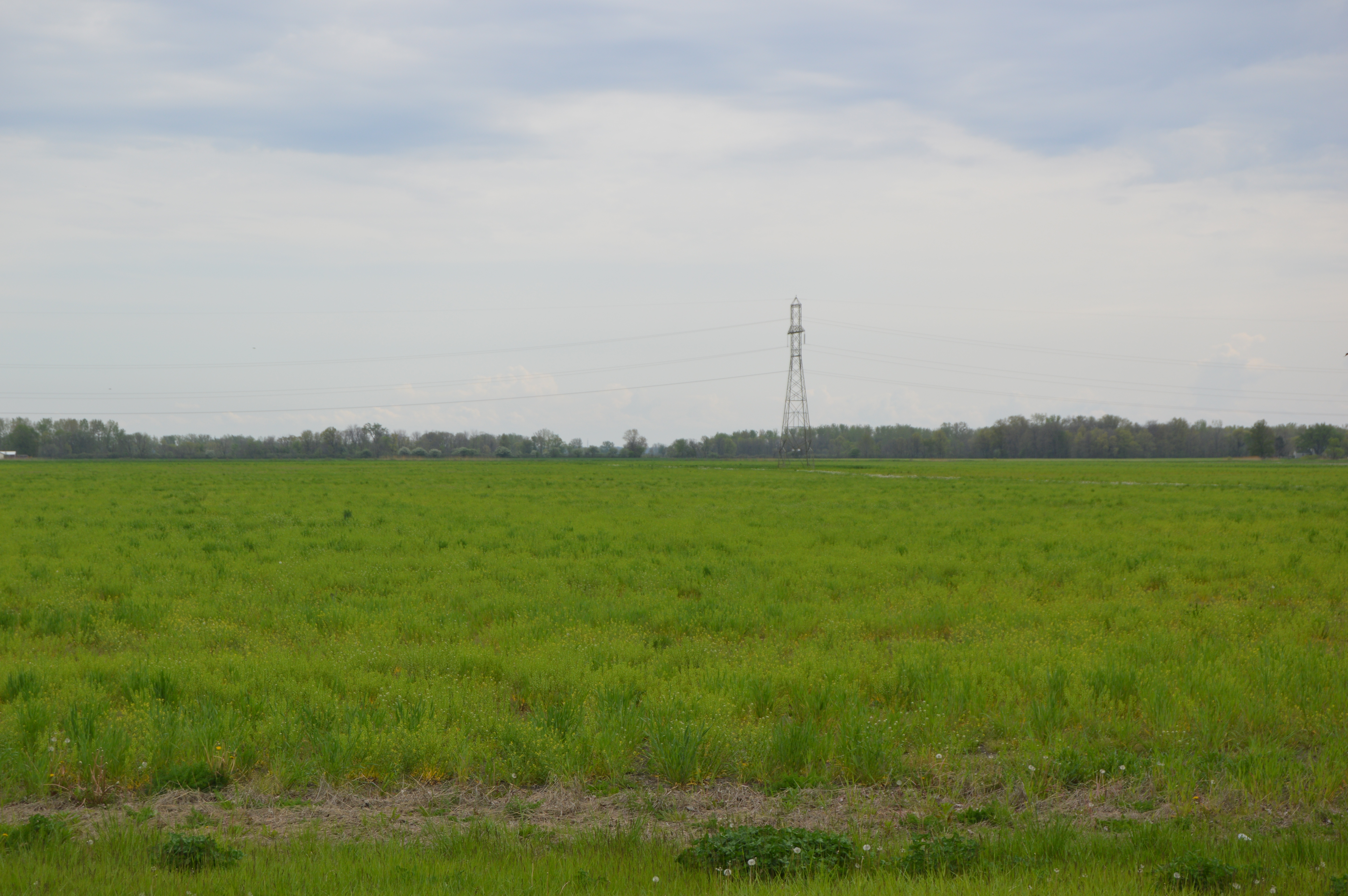
- Fields near State Route 53

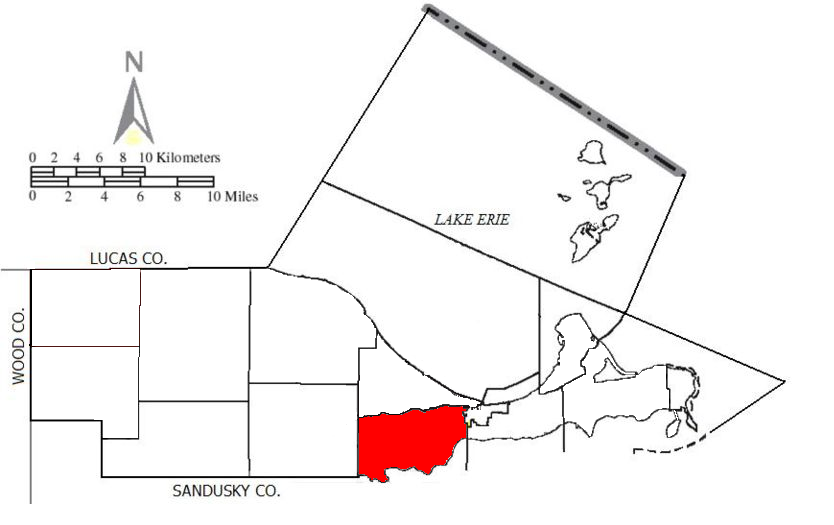
- Location of Bay Township in Ottawa County.
- Coordinates: 41°29′32″N 83°0′47″W
- Country: United States
- State: Ohio
- County: Ottawa

Area
  - Total: 21.9 sq mi (56.7 km^{2})
  - Land: 16.2 sq mi (41.9 km^{2})
  - Water: 5.7 sq mi (14.8 km^{2})
- Elevation: 577 ft (176 m)

Population (2020)
  - Total: 1,142
  - Density: 70.6/sq mi (27.3/km^{2})
- Time zone: UTC-5 (Eastern (EST))
  - Summer (DST): UTC-4 (EDT)
- FIPS code: 39-04304
- GNIS feature ID: 1086755
- Website: https://www.baytownship.com/

Bay Township is one of the twelve townships of Ottawa County, Ohio, United States. The 2020 census found 1,142 people in the township.

== Geography ==
Located in the southern part of the county along Sandusky Bay, it borders the following townships:

- Erie Township - north
- Portage Township - east
- Margaretta Township, Erie County - southeast corner, across Sandusky Bay
- Riley Township, Sandusky County - south, across Sandusky Bay
- Rice Township, Sandusky County - southwest corner, across Sandusky Bay
- Salem Township - west

A small part of the city of Port Clinton, the county seat of Ottawa County, is located in the northeastern corner of Bay Township.

The Portage River forms the border with Erie Township

== Name and history ==
It is the only Bay Township statewide.

== Government ==
The township is governed by a three-member board of trustees, who are elected in November of odd-numbered years to a four-year term beginning on the following January 1. Two are elected in the year after the presidential election and one is elected in the year before it. There is also an elected township fiscal officer, who serves a four-year term beginning on April 1 of the year after the election, which is held in November of the year before the presidential election. Vacancies in the fiscal officership or on the board of trustees are filled by the remaining trustees.
