= Woodville, Ohio =

- Village
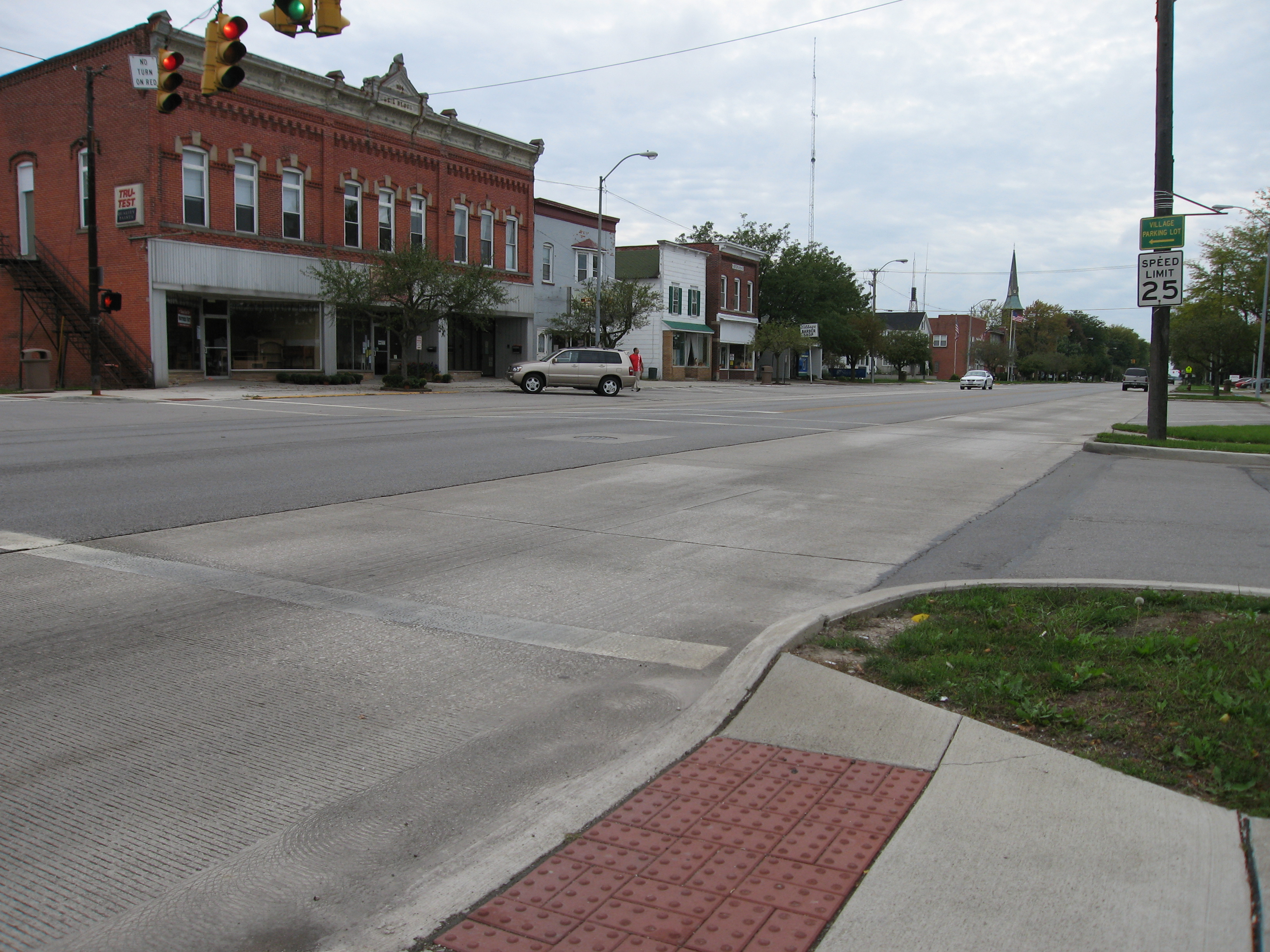
- Main Street runs concurrently with U.S. Route 20 and State Route 105 in downtown Woodville
- Motto: "Lime Center of the World"
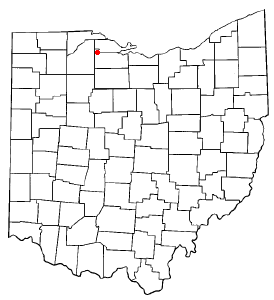
- Location of Woodville, Ohio

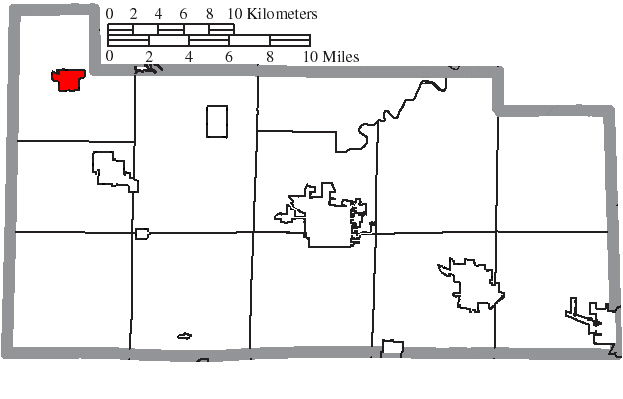
- Location of Woodville in Sandusky County
- Coordinates: 41°27′07″N 83°22′26″W
- Country: United States
- State: Ohio
- County: Sandusky
- Township: Woodville

Area
  - Total: 1.35 sq mi (3.49 km^{2})
  - Land: 1.35 sq mi (3.49 km^{2})
  - Water: 0 sq mi (0.00 km^{2})
- Elevation: 637 ft (194 m)

Population (2020)
  - Total: 2,006
  - Density: 1,488.6/sq mi (574.75/km^{2})
- Time zone: UTC-5 (Eastern (EST))
  - Summer (DST): UTC-4 (EDT)
- ZIP code: 43469
- Area code: 419
- FIPS code: 39-86492
- GNIS feature ID: 2399739
- Website: villageofwoodville.com

Woodville is a village in Sandusky County, Ohio, United States. The population was 1,985 according to the 2023 census. The National Arbor Day Foundation has designated Woodville as a Tree City USA.

== History ==
Woodville was laid out and platted in 1836. It was named for General Amos E. Wood.

Woodville was the midway point on the Western Reserve and Maumee Turnpike, which was also known as the "Old Mud Pike" because of the thick mud that often mired animals and vehicles alike. It was the first permanent route across the Black Swamp. The toll road connected Perrysburg with Lower Sandusky, which has since been renamed Fremont.

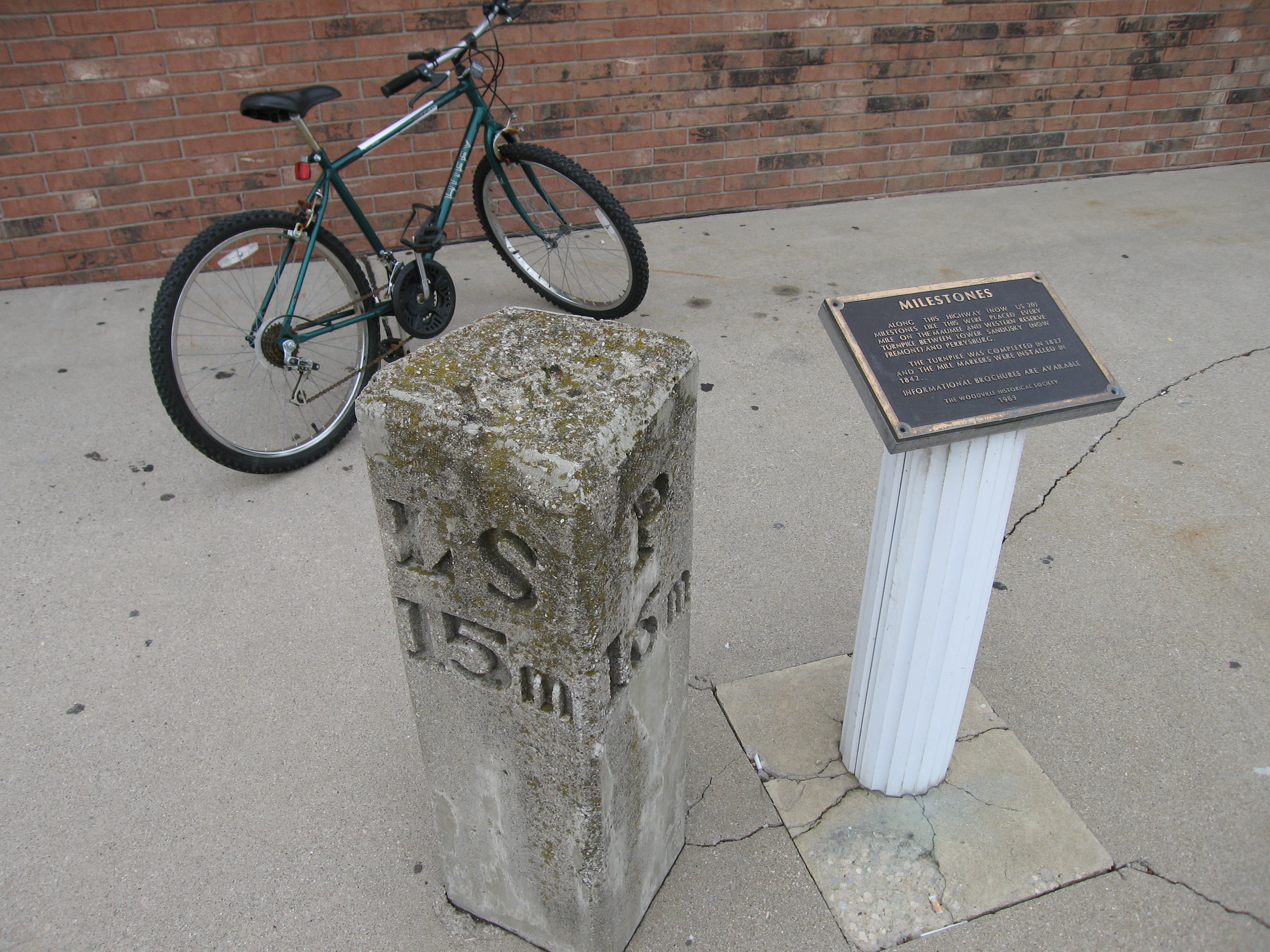
The 1842 milestone on the Western Reserve and Maumee Turnpike marks a point 16 miles from Perrysburg and 15 miles from Lower Sandusky (now Fremont).

A mile marker from the road remains at 100 East Main Street, in front of the village pharmacy. Several of the milestones are still in place along the 31 miles (50 km) stretch between present day Fremont and Perrysburg. The route is currently designated U.S. Route 20. Woodville is also the point at which U.S. 20 crosses the Portage River. The former Pennsylvania Railroad also crossed the Portage River in Woodville. The line was at one time a main route from Toledo to Pittsburgh.

To the north of Woodville lies Woodville Road emanating from Toledo, passes through Genoa, ending in Elmore. It does not pass through Woodville.

A half mile upstream from the highway and the rail bridges lies Trailmarker Park. This is site of a shallow point in the river where Native Americans routinely crossed the Portage. A tree that was bent by Native Americans to mark the crossing point had a large limb that stretched over the west bank of the river, just south of the Cherry Street bridge. However, the limb was mistakenly removed by village workers in the 1990s.

State Route 105 also runs through Woodville.

== Geography ==
According to the United States Census Bureau, the village has a total area of 1.33 square miles (3.44 km^{2}), all land.

== Demographics ==
Historical population
Census	Pop.	Note	%±
1880	406		—
1900	831		—
1910	807		−2.9%
1920	910		12.8%
1930	1,151		26.5%
1940	1,219		5.9%
1950	1,358		11.4%
1960	1,700		25.2%
1970	1,834		7.9%
1980	2,050		11.8%
1990	1,953		−4.7%
2000	1,977		1.2%
2010	2,135		8.0%
2020	2,006		−6.0%
U.S. Decennial Census

=== 2010 census ===
As of the census of 2010, there were 2,135 people, 850 households, and 581 families residing in the village. The population density was 1,605.3 inhabitants per square mile (619.8/km^{2}). There were 894 housing units at an average density of 672.2 per square mile (259.5/km^{2}). The racial makeup of the village was 96.3% White, 0.3% African American, 0.1% Native American, 0.8% Asian, 1.8% from other races, and 0.8% from two or more races. Hispanic or Latino of any race were 6.0% of the population.

There were 850 households, of which 33.5% had children under the age of 18 living with them, 55.9% were married couples living together, 8.8% had a female householder with no husband present, 3.6% had a male householder with no wife present, and 31.6% were non-families. 27.5% of all households were made up of individuals, and 13.6% had someone living alone who was 65 years of age or older. The average household size was 2.51 and the average family size was 3.07.

The median age in the village was 39.1 years. 25.5% of residents were under the age of 18; 7.6% were between the ages of 18 and 24; 24.6% were from 25 to 44; 26.8% were from 45 to 64; and 15.4% were 65 years of age or older. The gender makeup of the village was 48.7% male and 51.3% female.

=== 2000 census ===
As of the census of 2000, there were 1,977 people, 786 households, and 558 families residing in the village. The population density was 1,585.7 inhabitants per square mile (612.2/km^{2}). There were 815 housing units at an average density of 653.7 per square mile (252.4/km^{2}). The racial makeup of the village was 97.67% White, 0.15% African American, 0.25% Native American, 0.86% from other races, and 1.06% from two or more races. Hispanic or Latino of any race were 3.19% of the population.

There were 786 households, out of which 37.0% had children under the age of 18 living with them, 59.8% were married couples living together, 8.3% had a female householder with no husband present, and 28.9% were non-families. 25.4% of all households were made up of individuals, and 14.2% had someone living alone who was 65 years of age or older. The average household size was 2.52 and the average family size was 3.04.

In the village, the population was spread out, with 27.8% under the age of 18, 5.6% from 18 to 24, 28.5% from 25 to 44, 22.5% from 45 to 64, and 15.6% who were 65 years of age or older. The median age was 38 years. For every 100 females there were 90.8 males. For every 100 females age 18 and over, there were 86.5 males.

The median income for a household in the village was $47,039, and the median income for a family was $56,467. Males had a median income of $38,793 versus $28,350 for females. The per capita income for the village was $21,414. About 2.3% of families and 3.9% of the population were below the poverty line, including 4.3% of those under age 18 and 4.4% of those age 65 or over.

== Schools ==
Woodville and the surrounding Woodville Township are part of the Woodmore Local School District. Until 1968 Woodville had its own school district and the athletic teams were known as the Warriors, with a Native American mascot. In 1968, Woodville's school absorbed the Harris-Elmore Local Schools and the name of the district was changed to Woodmore. Elmore's athletic teams formerly competed as the Bulldogs.

Immediately following the consolidation, students attended classes through fifth grade in their hometown, or the village nearest to their homes. A portion of the school in Woodville was used as a Middle School for grades 6-8 and the Elmore building was used as the High School for all students. In the early 1980s, all students in grades K-6 began attending school in Woodville and all students in grades 7-12 were moved to the high school in Elmore.

Most of the high school was demolished, rebuilt and opened for the 1990–91 academic year. The original portion of the Elementary School dates back to 1923. A new school building in Woodville is under construction and will house K-8. It is expected to be complete for the 2015–16 academic year.

Woodmore High School athletic teams are called the Wildcats and compete in the Northern Buckeye Conference.

Woodville has a public library, a branch of the Birchard Public Library Of Sandusky County.

== Industry ==
Limestone is the primary export of Woodville. Two quarries located in Woodville Township each rank in the top ten in size in the United States among lime quarries.

== Recreation ==
There are three public parks in Woodville: Trailmarker Park is the largest. It is located along the west bank of the Portage River and is home to a public pool, several pieces of playground equipment and a boat ramp. Veterans Memorial Park is also referred to locally as Waterworks Park because of its proximity to the water treatment plant on North Perry Street. The park features a memorial to soldiers, complete with a decommissioned cannon and is located on First Street between Walnut and Perry Streets. Playground equipment is also in place at Veterans Memorial Park. Busdiecker Park was originally named Teardrop Park because of its shape. It is located at the intersection of Main Street (U. S. 20) and Findlay Road and is also bounded by the Portage River. Busdiecker Park features 13 flagpoles, one for each of the astronauts killed in the United States space program at the time of the park's renaming in the mid 1990s.

== Notable people ==
- Jon Giesler, former football player for the Miami Dolphins
- Terence T. Henricks, astronaut
