= Graytown, Ohio =

- Unincorporated community
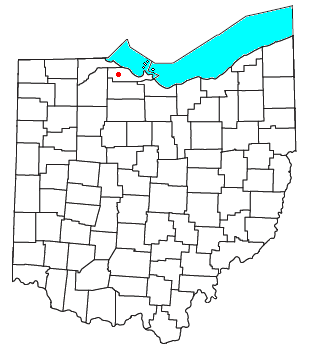
- Location of Graytown, Ohio
- Coordinates: 41°32′34″N 83°15′40″W
- Country: United States
- State: Ohio
- County: Ottawa
- Township: Benton
- Elevation: 597 ft (182 m)
- Time zone: UTC-5 (Eastern (EST))
  - Summer (DST): UTC-4 (EDT)
- ZIP codes: 43432
- GNIS feature ID: 1048801

Graytown is an unincorporated community in southwestern Benton Township, Ottawa County, Ohio, United States. It had a post office but it was closed mid-2025 its zip code was 43432.

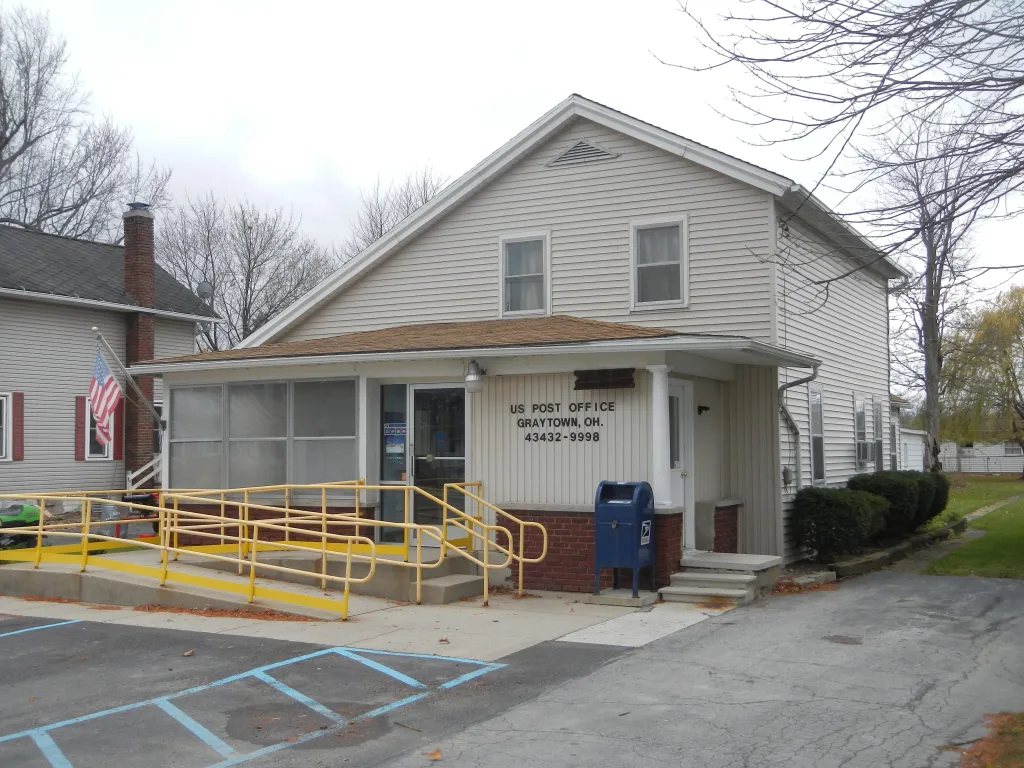
Graytown, Ohio Post Office Location Address:1778 Walker St., Graytown, Ohio 43432.

Graytown is a small unincorporated community with few business operations. Luckey Farmers Inc. and The Country Keg (a restaurant and bar) are two current commercial entities in Graytown. Other areas of interest include a park with multiple baseball diamonds and soccer fields which are used for various leagues. Until 2012, Graytown had an elementary school. Until the Benton Carroll Salem Local School District closed it and sold the property to North Point Education Service Center.
