= Sandusky Township, Sandusky County, Ohio =

Township in Ohio, US

- Township
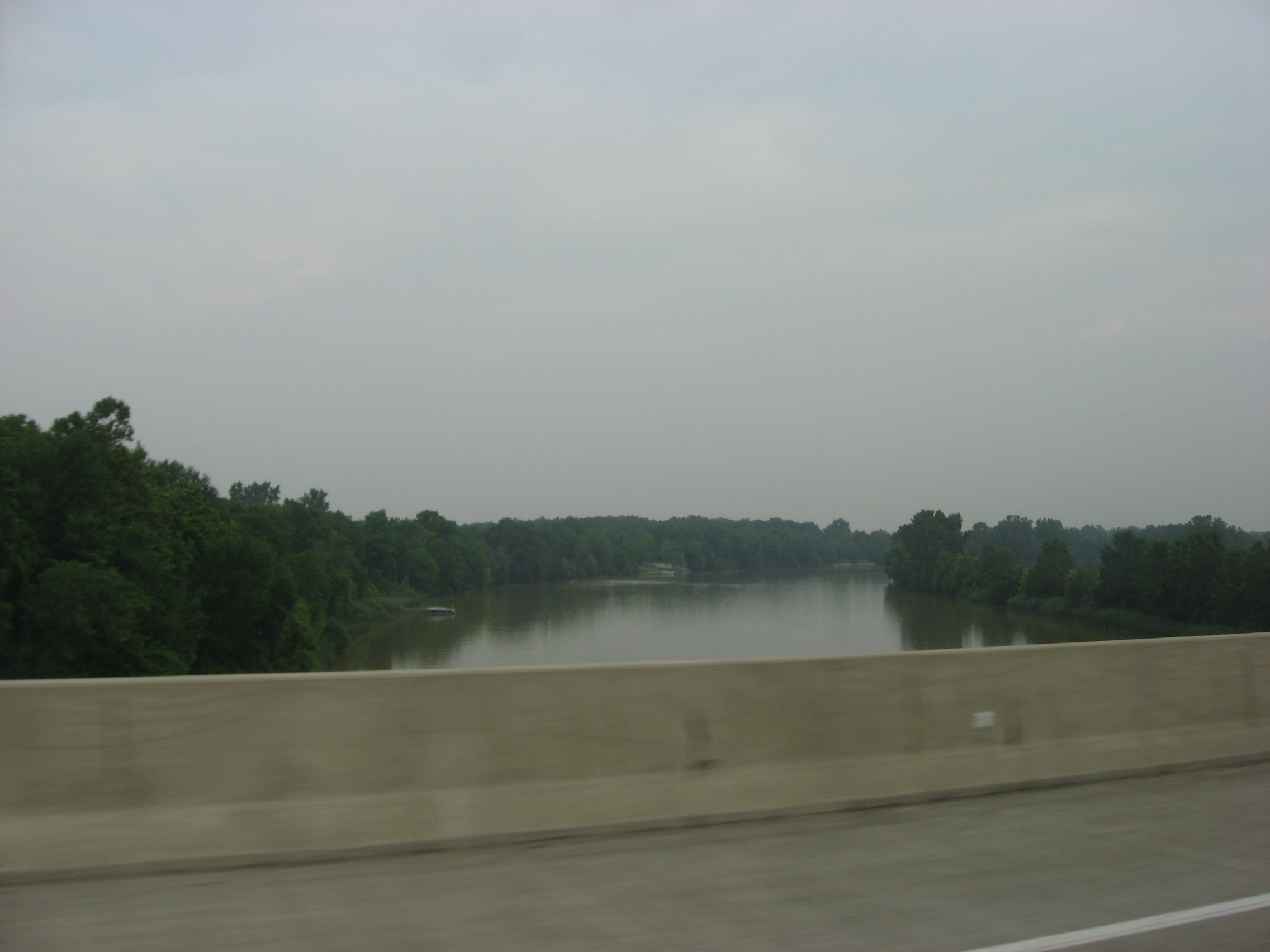
- Along the Sandusky River, which flows through Sandusky Township

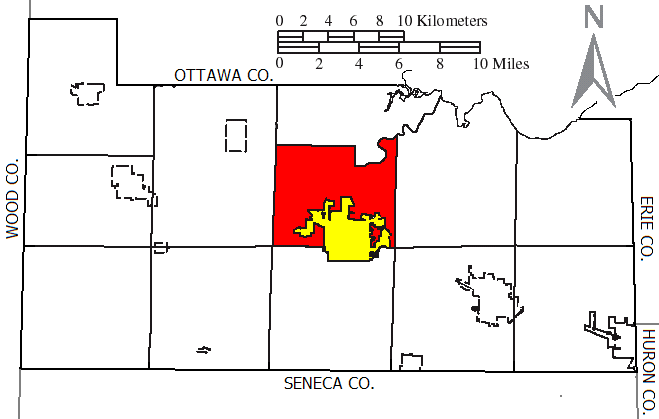
- Location of Sandusky Township, Sandusky County, Ohio.
- Coordinates: 41°22′4″N 83°7′38″W
- Country: United States
- State: Ohio
- County: Sandusky

Area
  - Total: 22.9 sq mi (59.4 km^{2})
  - Land: 22.4 sq mi (58.1 km^{2})
  - Water: 0.50 sq mi (1.3 km^{2})
- Elevation: 614 ft (187 m)

Population (2020)
  - Total: 3,551
  - Density: 158/sq mi (61.1/km^{2})
- Time zone: UTC-5 (Eastern (EST))
  - Summer (DST): UTC-4 (EDT)
- FIPS code: 39-70408
- GNIS feature ID: 1086916

Sandusky Township is one of the twelve townships of Sandusky County, Ohio, United States. As of the 2020 census, 3,551 people lived in the township.

== Geography ==
Located in the center of the county, it borders the following townships:

- Rice Township - north
- Riley Township - east
- Green Creek Township - southeast corner
- Ballville Township - south
- Jackson Township - southwest corner
- Washington Township - west

It is the only township in Sandusky County without a border on another county.

Most of the city of Fremont, the county seat of Sandusky County, is located in southern Sandusky Township. The census-designated place of Stony Prairie also lies in southwestern Sandusky Township.

The Sandusky River flows through Sandusky Township before emptying into Sandusky Bay.

== Name and history ==
Statewide, other Sandusky Townships are located in Crawford and Richland Counties.

== Government ==
The township is governed by a three-member board of trustees, who are elected in November of odd-numbered years to a four-year term beginning on the following January 1. Two are elected in the year after the presidential election and one is elected in the year before it. There is also an elected township fiscal officer, who serves a four-year term beginning on April 1 of the year after the election, which is held in November of the year before the presidential election. Vacancies in the fiscal officership or on the board of trustees are filled by the remaining trustees.
