= Salem Township, Ottawa County, Ohio =

Township in Ohio, US

- Township
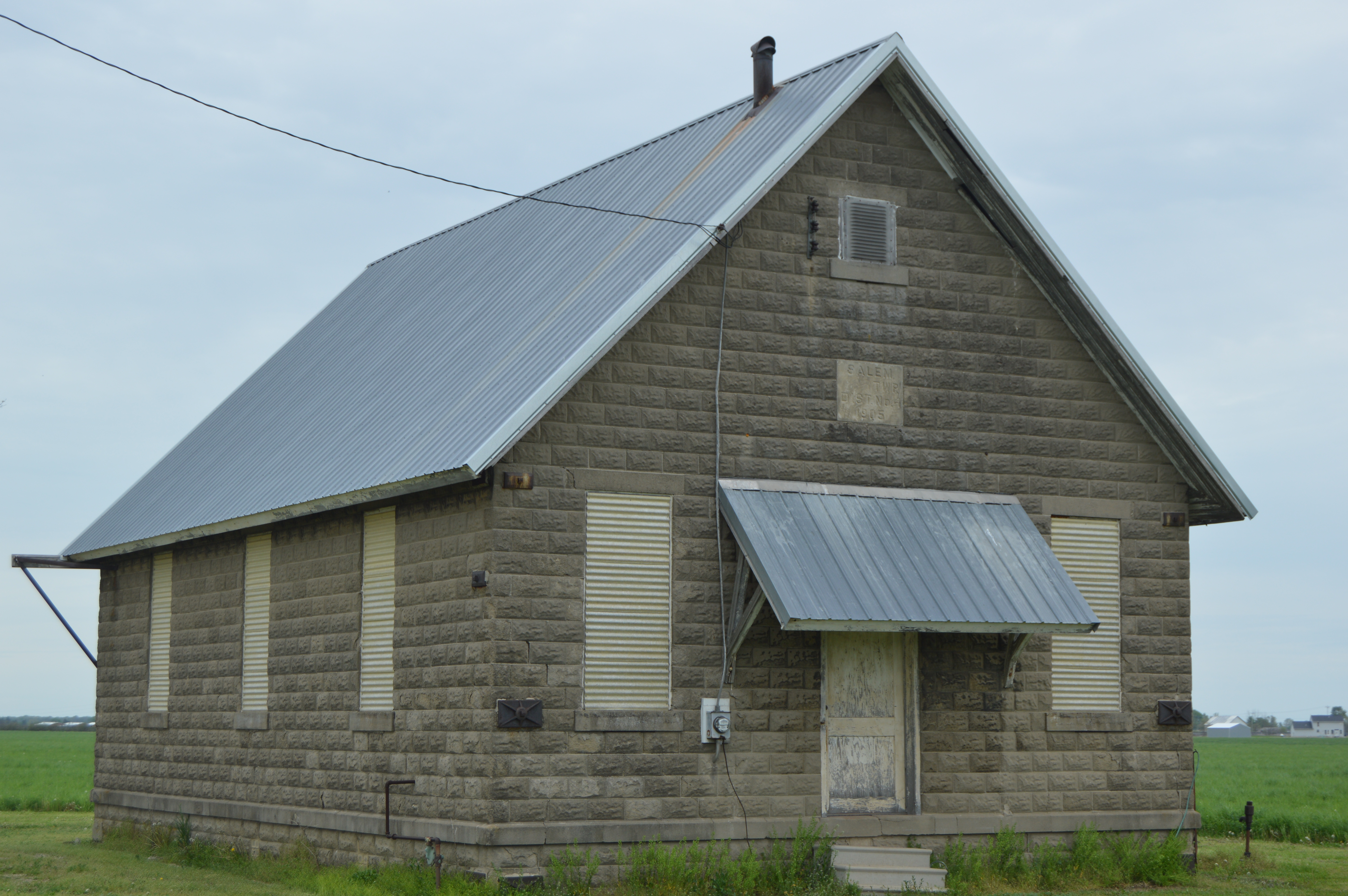
- Former School #4, northwest of Oak Harbor

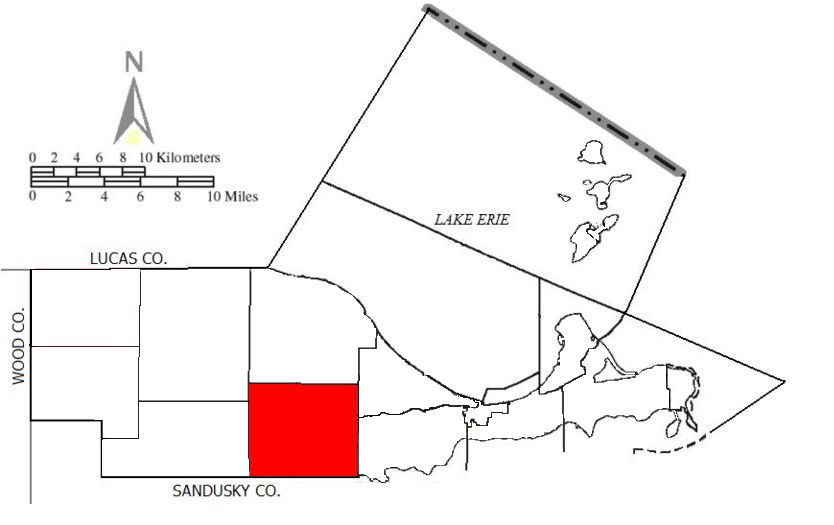
- Location of Salem Township in Ottawa County.
- Coordinates: 41°30′23″N 83°7′32″W
- Country: United States
- State: Ohio
- County: Ottawa

Area
  - Total: 30.3 sq mi (78.6 km^{2})
  - Land: 29.1 sq mi (75.4 km^{2})
  - Water: 1.2 sq mi (3.2 km^{2})
- Elevation: 571 ft (174 m)

Population (2020)
  - Total: 5,311
  - Density: 182/sq mi (70.4/km^{2})
- Time zone: UTC-5 (Eastern (EST))
  - Summer (DST): UTC-4 (EDT)
- FIPS code: 39-69946
- GNIS feature ID: 1086765

Salem Township is one of the twelve townships of Ottawa County, Ohio, United States. The 2020 census found 5,311 people in the township.

== Geography ==
Located in the southern part of the county, it borders the following townships:

- Carroll Township - north
- Erie Township - northeast
- Bay Township - east
- Rice Township, Sandusky County - south
- Washington Township, Sandusky County - southwest corner
- Harris Township - west
- Benton Township - northwest

The village of Oak Harbor is located in the township's northwest.

The Portage River runs from west to east through Salem Township before emptying into Lake Erie.

== Name and history ==
It is one of fourteen Salem Townships statewide.

== Government ==
The township is governed by a three-member board of trustees, who are elected in November of odd-numbered years to a four-year term beginning on the following January 1. Two are elected in the year after the presidential election and one is elected in the year before it. There is also an elected township fiscal officer, who serves a four-year term beginning on April 1 of the year after the election, which is held in November of the year before the presidential election. Vacancies in the fiscal officership or on the board of trustees are filled by the remaining trustees.
