= Washington Township, Sandusky County, Ohio =

Township in Ohio, US

- Township
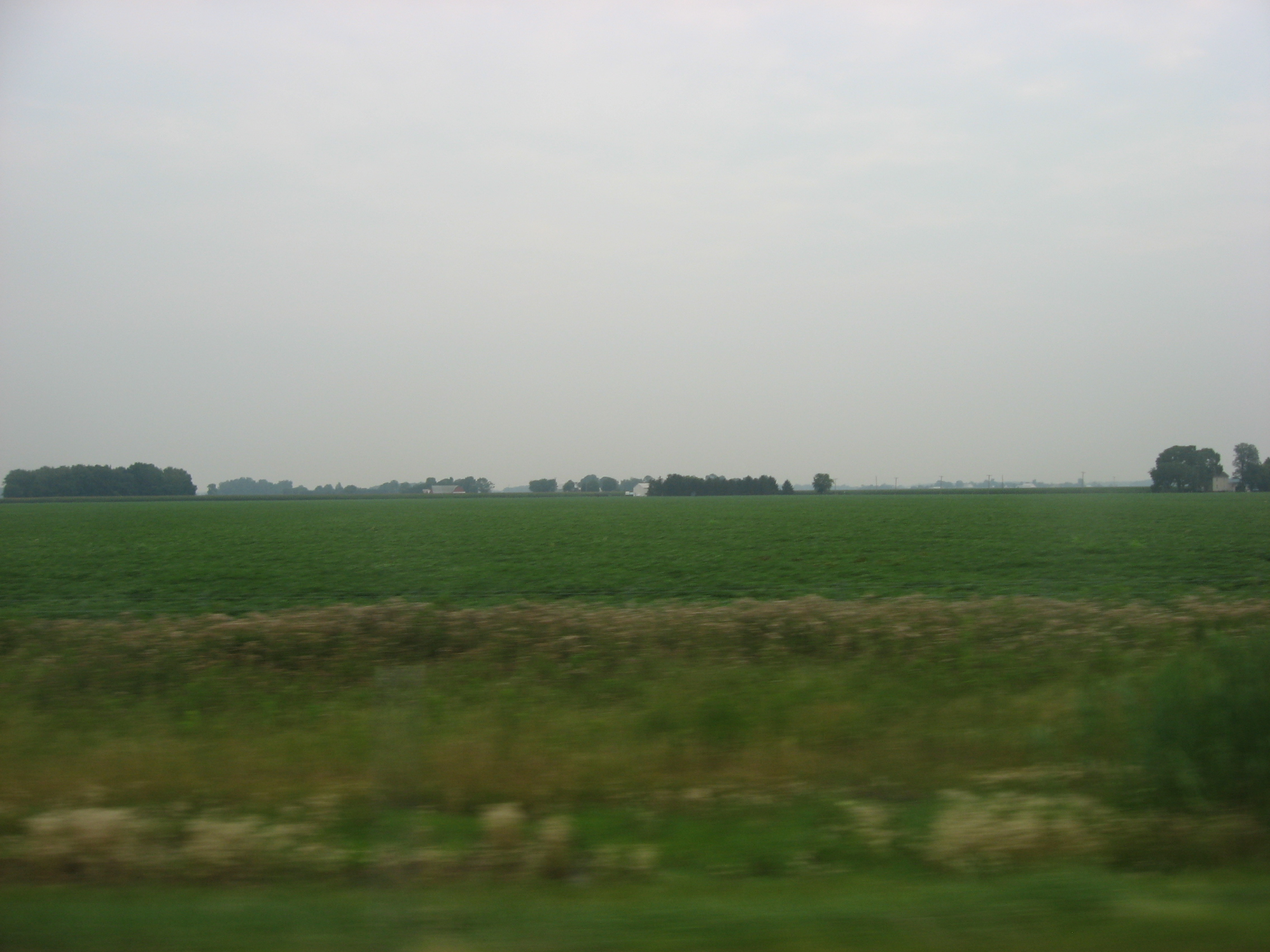
- Farm fields in northeastern Washington Township

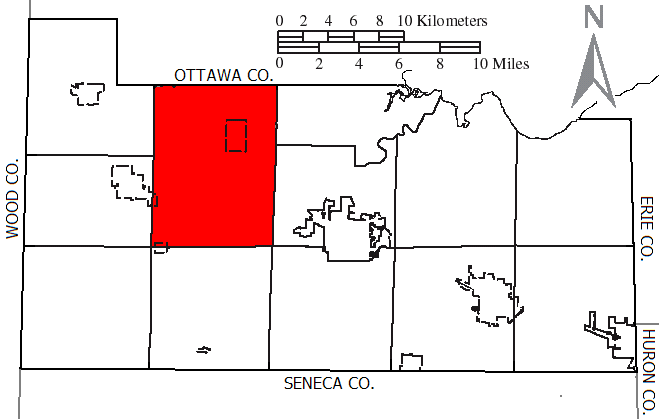
- Location of Washington Township, Sandusky County, Ohio
- Coordinates: 41°24′11″N 83°14′46″W
- Country: United States
- State: Ohio
- County: Sandusky

Area
  - Total: 48.6 sq mi (125.9 km^{2})
  - Land: 48.6 sq mi (125.8 km^{2})
  - Water: 0.077 sq mi (0.2 km^{2})
- Elevation: 636 ft (194 m)

Population (2020)
  - Total: 2,315
  - Density: 48/sq mi (18.4/km^{2})
- Time zone: UTC-5 (Eastern (EST))
  - Summer (DST): UTC-4 (EDT)
- FIPS code: 39-81592
- GNIS feature ID: 1086919
- Website: https://sites.google.com/view/washington-sandusky/home

Washington Township is one of the twelve townships of Sandusky County, Ohio, United States. As of the 2020 census, 2,315 people lived in the township.>

== Geography ==
Located in the northwestern part of the county, it borders the following townships:

- Harris Township, Ottawa County - north
- Salem Township, Ottawa County - northeast corner, north of Rice Township
- Rice Township - northeast, south of Salem Township
- Sandusky Township - east
- Ballville Township - southeast corner
- Jackson Township - south
- Scott Township - southwest corner
- Madison Township - west
- Woodville Township - northwest

Four villages are located in Washington Township:

- Part of Elmore in the northwest
- Part of Gibsonburg in the west
- Part of Helena in the southwest
- Lindsey in the northeast

Washington Township also contains the census-designated place of Hessville.

== Name and history ==
It is one of forty-three Washington Townships statewide.

== Government ==
The township is governed by a three-member board of trustees, who are elected in November of odd-numbered years to a four-year term beginning on the following January 1. Two are elected in the year after the presidential election and one is elected in the year before it. There is also an elected township fiscal officer, who serves a four-year term beginning on April 1 of the year after the election, which is held in November of the year before the presidential election. Vacancies in the fiscal officership or on the board of trustees are filled by the remaining trustees.
