= Magee Marsh Wildlife Area =

Protected area in Ohio, United States

- IUCN category V (protected landscape/seascape)
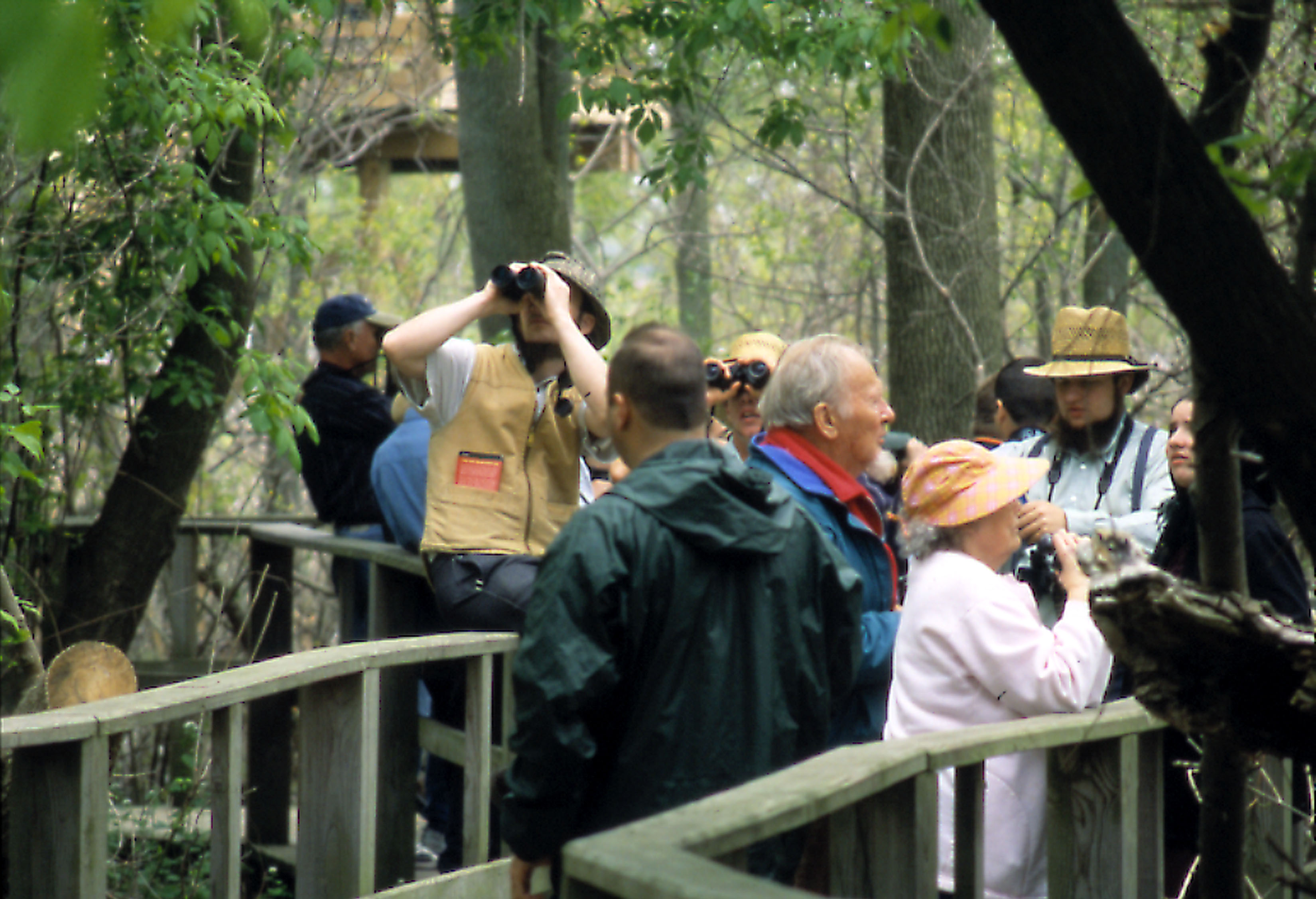
- Birdwatchers at Magee Marsh Wildlife Area

- Location within Ohio Location within the United States
- Location: Carroll Township, Ottawa County, Ohio, United States
- Coordinates: 41.61555°N 83.16316°W
- Area: 2,202 acres (8.91 km^{2})
- Established: 1951
- Governing body: Ohio Department of Natural Resources Division of Wildlife
- Website: Magee Marsh Wildlife Area

Magee Marsh Wildlife Area is a state wildlife area in Carroll Township, Ottawa County, Ohio, along the shore of Lake Erie. The marsh has a large seasonal population of waterfowl and other birds, making it a popular destination for birdwatching and hunting during migrations. It is managed by the Ohio Department of Natural Resources.

== History ==
One of the first written accounts of the Magee Marsh area came from Samuel Brown, a soldier in the War of 1812, who described large flocks of waterfowl that would be "worth a journey of five hundred miles just to see them". White settlement in the swampy regions of Northwest Ohio accelerated in the 1850s, and the marshes along Lake Erie were largely turned into private hunting clubs. John Magee bought the Magee Marsh property in 1903; though he planned to start a farm on the site, frequent flooding convinced him to keep the land as a hunting ground. The state of Ohio bought the marshland in 1951 to create the Magee Marsh Wildlife Area.

Magee Marsh was one of the sites chosen to reintroduce the Canada goose to Ohio in the 1960s. The program hatches 9,000 to 11,000 goslings each year, making it one of the nation's most successful wildlife reintroduction programs.

== Birdwatching ==
Due to the large number of birds that stop at the marsh during migration, Magee Marsh is a popular site for birdwatching, particularly on its boardwalk trail. The Black Swamp Bird Observatory hosts the Biggest Week in American Birding festival at the marsh in early May; the festival typically draws 60,000 to 80,000 visitors to the marsh each year.
