= Ohio State Route 50 =

State Route 50

Route information
- Maintained by ODOT

Location
- Country: United States
- State: Ohio

Highway system
- Ohio State Highway System; Interstate; US; State; Scenic
← US 50	→ SR 51

In Ohio, State Route 50 may refer to:

- U.S. Route 50 in Ohio, the only Ohio highway numbered 50 since 1927
- Ohio State Route 50 (1923-1927), now SR 48
