= Stony Prairie, Ohio =

- CDP
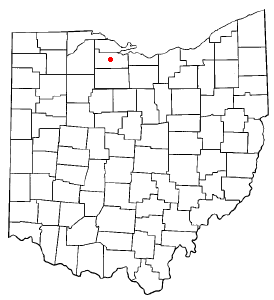
- Location of Stony Prairie, Ohio
- Coordinates: 41°20′45″N 83°09′08″W
- Country: United States
- State: Ohio
- County: Sandusky
- Township: Sandusky

Area
  - Total: 1.60 sq mi (4.15 km^{2})
  - Land: 1.60 sq mi (4.15 km^{2})
  - Water: 0 sq mi (0.00 km^{2})
- Elevation: 548 ft (167 m)

Population (2020)
  - Total: 1,218
  - Density: 759.4/sq mi (293.21/km^{2})
- Time zone: UTC-5 (Eastern (EST))
  - Summer (DST): UTC-4 (EDT)
- FIPS code: 39-74832
- GNIS feature ID: 2393249

Stony Prairie is a census-designated place (CDP) in Sandusky County, Ohio, United States. The population was 1,218 at the 2020 census.

"Stony Prairie" originally referred to a region in the area.

== Geography ==
According to the United States Census Bureau, the CDP has a total area of 1.5 square miles (3.9 km^{2}), all land.

== Demographics ==
Historical population
Census	Pop.	Note	%±
2020	1,218		—
U.S. Decennial Census

As of the census of 2000, there were 836 people, 349 households, and 233 families residing in the CDP. The population density was 542.3 inhabitants per square mile (209.4/km^{2}). There were 367 housing units at an average density of 238.1 per square mile (91.9/km^{2}). The racial makeup of the CDP was 91.75% White, 0.96% African American, 0.24% Asian, 5.38% from other races, and 1.67% from two or more races. Hispanic or Latino of any race were 16.51% of the population.

There were 349 households, out of which 24.6% had children under the age of 18 living with them, 51.6% were married couples living together, 10.6% had a female householder with no husband present, and 33.0% were non-families. 28.7% of all households were made up of individuals, and 16.6% had someone living alone who was 65 years of age or older. The average household size was 2.40 and the average family size was 2.95.

In the CDP the population was spread out, with 22.7% under the age of 18, 7.9% from 18 to 24, 26.4% from 25 to 44, 22.5% from 45 to 64, and 20.5% who were 65 years of age or older. The median age was 41 years. For every 100 females there were 94.9 males. For every 100 females age 18 and over, there were 86.7 males.

The median income for a household in the CDP was $39,569, and the median income for a family was $46,346. Males had a median income of $36,823 versus $23,317 for females. The per capita income for the CDP was $16,871. About 7.4% of families and 6.6% of the population were below the poverty line, including none of those under age 18 and 28.8% of those age 65 or over.
