= Riley Township, Sandusky County, Ohio =

Township in Ohio, US

- Township
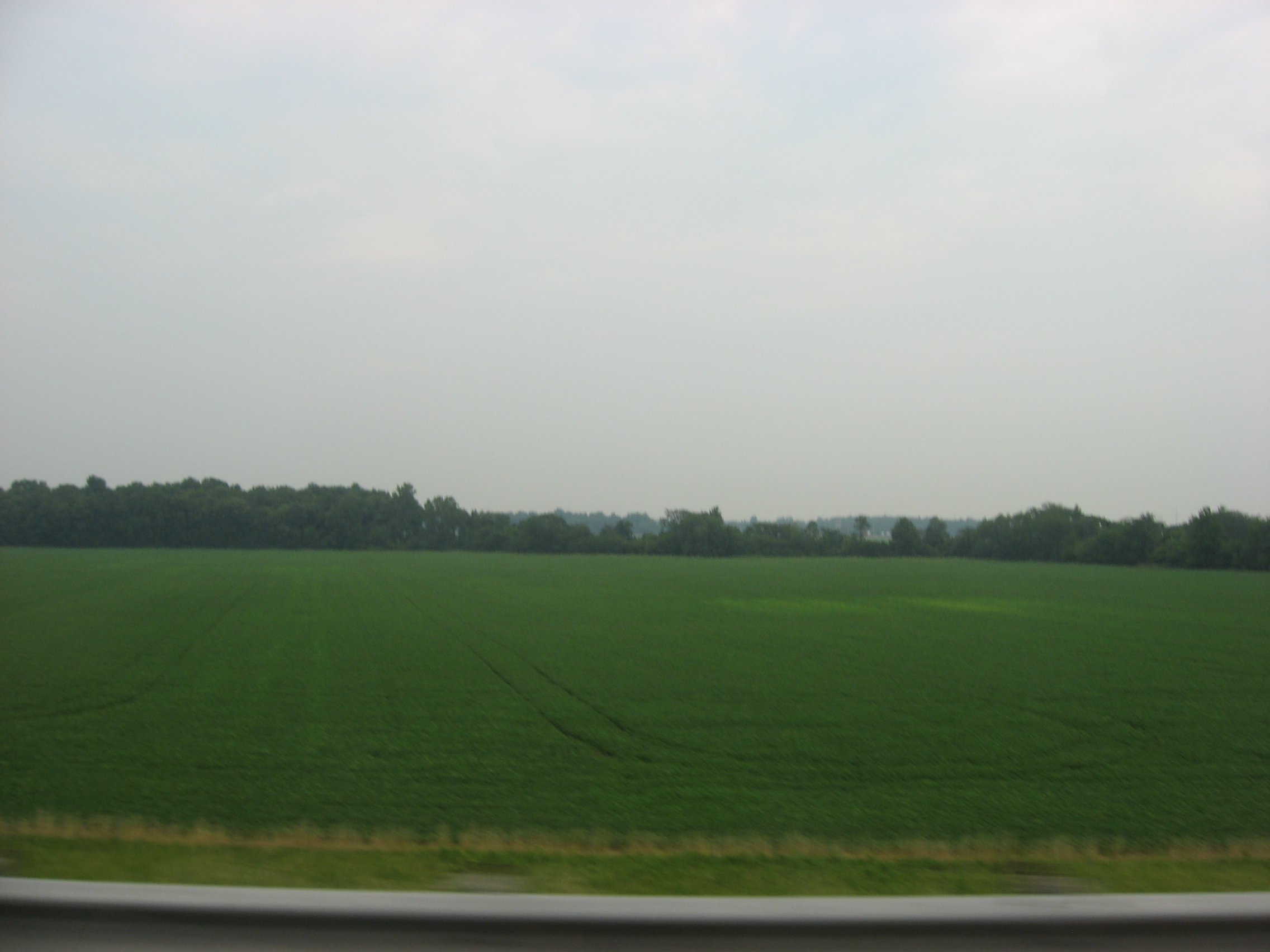
- Countryside in central Riley Township

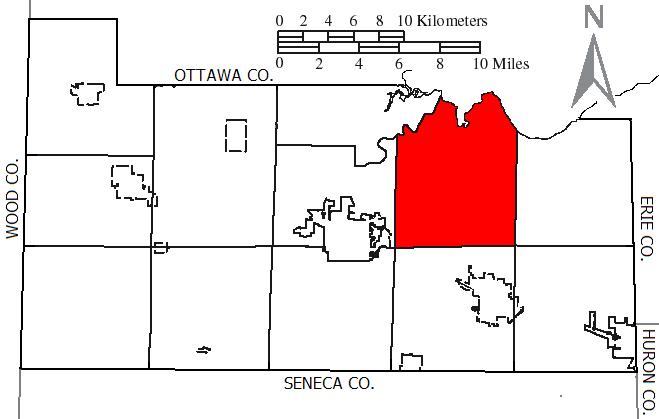
- Location of Riley Township, Sandusky County, Ohio.
- Coordinates: 41°23′0″N 83°0′44″W
- Country: United States
- State: Ohio
- County: Sandusky

Area
  - Total: 42.8 sq mi (110.8 km^{2})
  - Land: 38.6 sq mi (99.9 km^{2})
  - Water: 4.2 sq mi (10.9 km^{2})
- Elevation: 587 ft (179 m)

Population (2020)
  - Total: 1,214
  - Density: 32/sq mi (12.2/km^{2})
- Time zone: UTC-5 (Eastern (EST))
  - Summer (DST): UTC-4 (EDT)
- FIPS code: 39-67188
- GNIS feature ID: 1086915
- Website: https://www.rileytownship.org/

Riley Township is one of the twelve townships of Sandusky County, Ohio, United States. As of the 2020 census, 1,214 people lived in the township.

== Geography ==
Located in the northeastern part of the county along Sandusky Bay, it borders the following townships:

- Bay Township, Ottawa County - north, across Sandusky Bay
- Portage Township, Ottawa County - northwest corner, across Sandusky Bay, north of Margarette Township
- Margaretta Township, Erie County - northeast, across Sandusky Bay, south of Portage Township
- Townsend Township - east
- York Township - southeast corner
- Green Creek Township - south
- Ballville Township - southwest corner
- Sandusky Township - west
- Rice Township - northwest

No municipalities are located in Riley Township.

== Name and history ==
Statewide, the only other Riley Township is located in Putnam County.

== Government ==
The township is governed by a three-member board of trustees, who are elected in November of odd-numbered years to a four-year term beginning on the following January 1. Two are elected in the year after the presidential election and one is elected in the year before it. There is also an elected township fiscal officer, who serves a four-year term beginning on April 1 of the year after the election, which is held in November of the year before the presidential election. Vacancies in the fiscal officership or on the board of trustees are filled by the remaining trustees.
