= Portage Township, Ottawa County, Ohio =

Township in Ohio, US

- Township
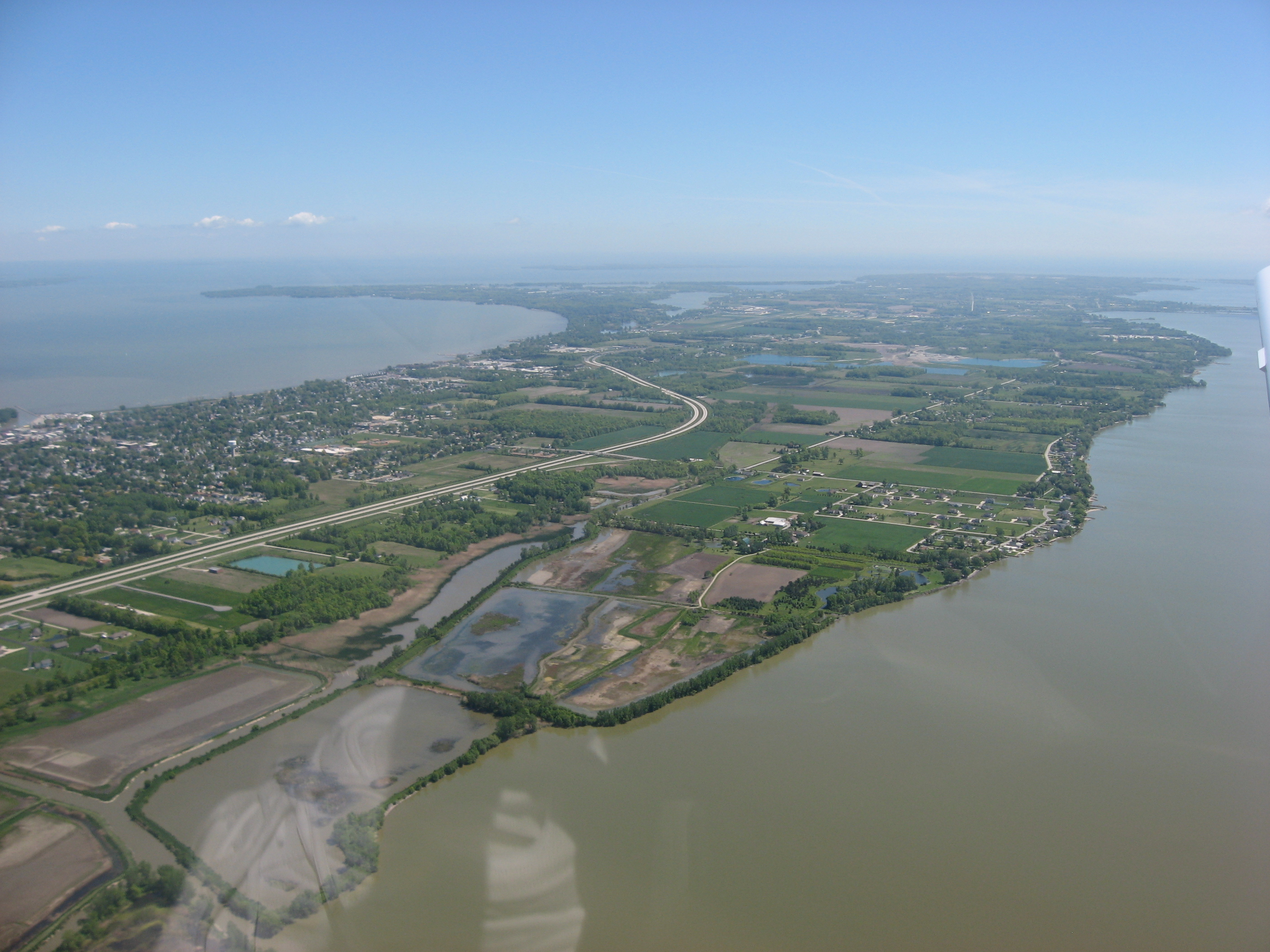
- Along the southern shoreline of Portage Township

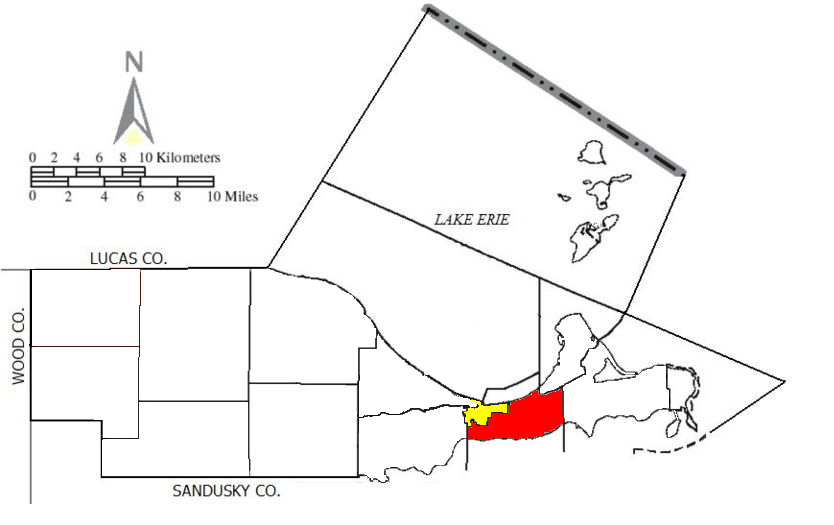
- Location of Portage Township in Ottawa County
- Coordinates: 41°30′28″N 82°53′54″W
- Country: United States
- State: Ohio
- County: Ottawa

Area
  - Total: 21.6 sq mi (56.0 km^{2})
  - Land: 9.0 sq mi (23.3 km^{2})
  - Water: 12.6 sq mi (32.7 km^{2})
- Elevation: 581 ft (177 m)

Population (2020)
  - Total: 1,217
  - Density: 135/sq mi (52.2/km^{2})
- Time zone: UTC-5 (Eastern (EST))
  - Summer (DST): UTC-4 (EDT)
- FIPS code: 39-64080
- GNIS feature ID: 1086763
- Website: https://portagetownship.net/

Portage Township is one of the twelve townships of Ottawa County, Ohio, United States. The 2020 census found 1,217 people in the township.

== Communities ==
- Gypsum is an Unincorporated community located at 41°29′36″N 82°52′33″W in the eastern portion of the township.

== Geography ==
Located in the eastern part of the county on the Marblehead Peninsula, it borders the following townships:

- Put-in-Bay Township - north, across Lake Erie
- Catawba Island Township - northeast
- Danbury Township - east
- Margaretta Township, Erie County - south, across Sandusky Bay
- Riley Township, Sandusky County - southwest corner, across Sandusky Bay
- Bay Township - west
- Erie Township - northwest

Most of the city of Port Clinton, the county seat of Ottawa County, is located northwest of the township.

== Name and history ==
Statewide, other Portage Townships are located in Hancock and Wood counties.

== Government ==
The township is governed by a three-member board of trustees, who are elected in November of odd-numbered years to a four-year term beginning on the following January 1. Two are elected in the year after the presidential election and one is elected in the year before it. There is also an elected township fiscal officer, who serves a four-year term beginning on April 1 of the year after the election, which is held in November of the year before the presidential election. Vacancies in the fiscal officership or on the board of trustees are filled by the remaining trustees.
