= Carroll Township, Ohio =

Township in Ohio, US

Carroll Township, Ottawa County, Ohio
- Township
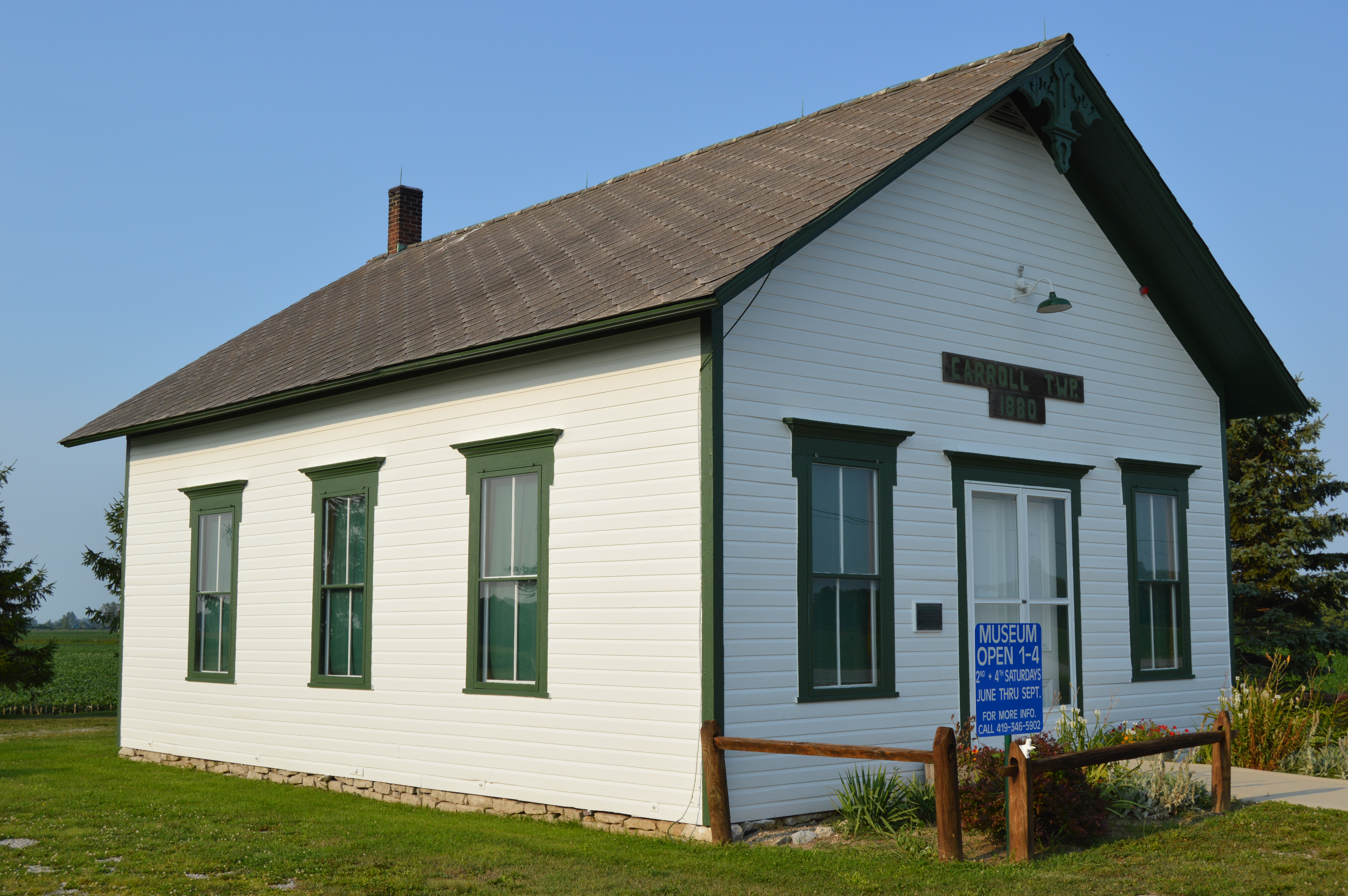
- Former township hall

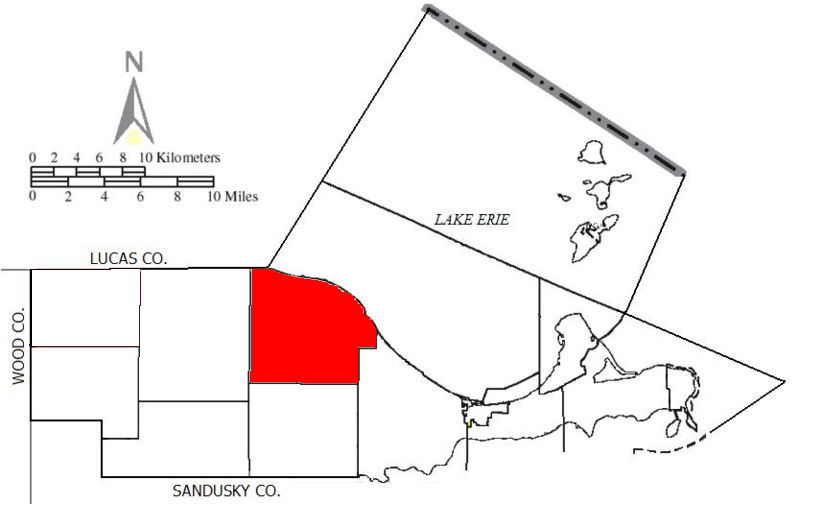
- Location of Carroll Township in Ottawa County.
- Coordinates: 41°35′31″N 83°6′59″W
- Country: United States
- State: Ohio
- County: Ottawa

Area
  - Total: 36.3 sq mi (93.9 km^{2})
  - Land: 33.7 sq mi (87.3 km^{2})
  - Water: 2.5 sq mi (6.6 km^{2})
- Elevation: 574 ft (175 m)

Population (2020)
  - Total: 2,117
  - Density: 62.8/sq mi (24.2/km^{2})
- Time zone: UTC-5 (Eastern (EST))
  - Summer (DST): UTC-4 (EDT)
- FIPS code: 39-12266
- GNIS feature ID: 1086757
- Website: http://carrolltownship.net/

Carroll Township is one of the twelve townships of Ottawa County, Ohio, United States. The 2020 census found 2,117 people in the township.

== Geography ==
Located in the northern part of the county along Lake Erie, it borders the following townships:

- Put-in-Bay Township - northeast, across Lake Erie
- Erie Township - southeast
- Salem Township - south
- Benton Township - west
- Jerusalem Township, Lucas County - northwest

No municipalities are located in Carroll Township.

Carroll Township also houses the Magee Marsh Wildlife Area and Davis-Besse Nuclear Power Station.

== Name and history ==
It is the only Carroll Township statewide.

== Government ==
The township is governed by a three-member board of trustees, who are elected in November of odd-numbered years to a four-year term beginning on the following January 1. Two are elected in the year after the presidential election and one is elected in the year before it. There is also an elected township fiscal officer, who serves a four-year term beginning on April 1 of the year after the election, which is held in November of the year before the presidential election. Vacancies in the fiscal officership or on the board of trustees are filled by the remaining trustees.
