= Harris Township, Ottawa County, Ohio =

Township in Ohio, US

- Township
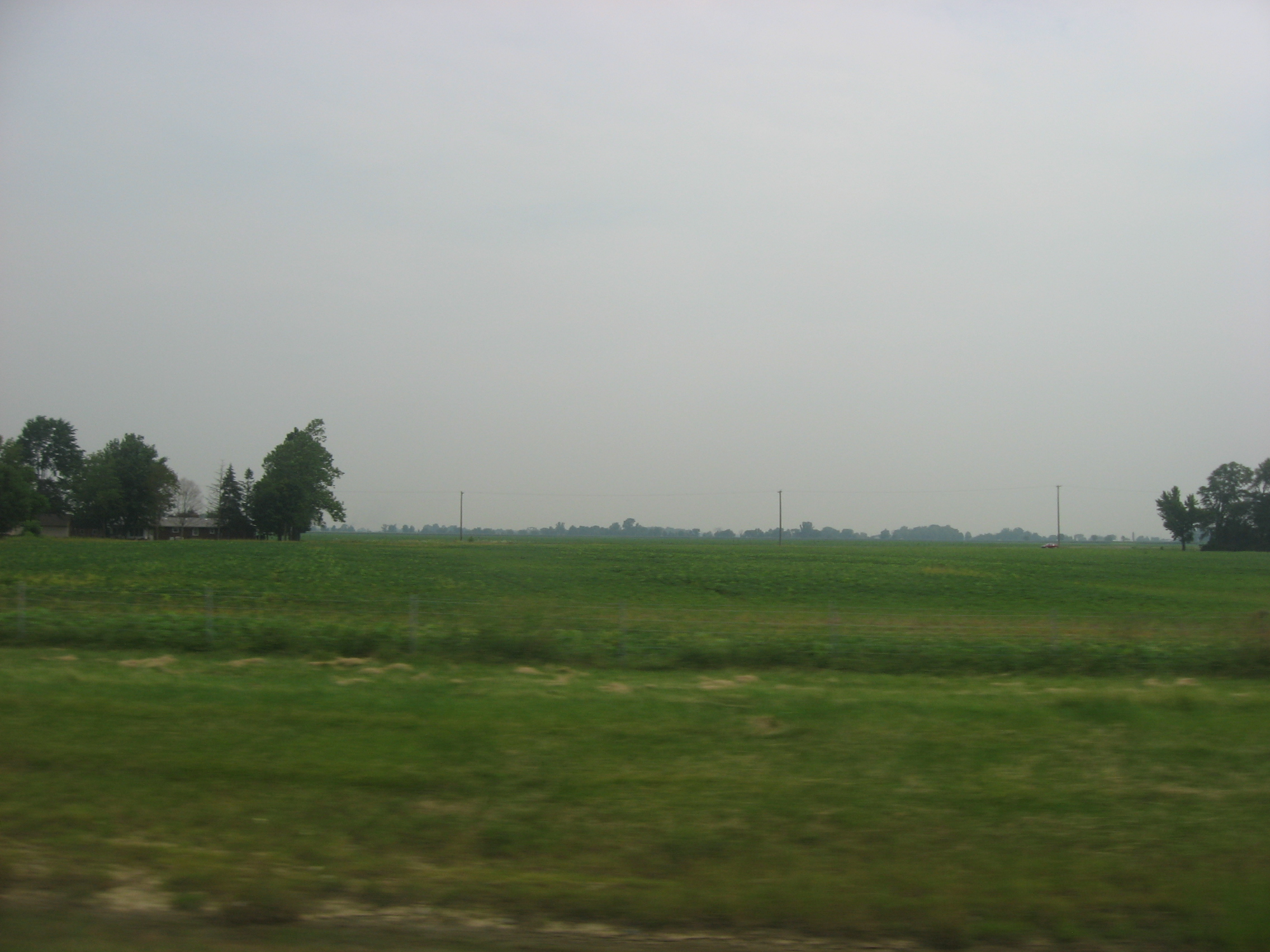
- Fields in southwestern Harris Township

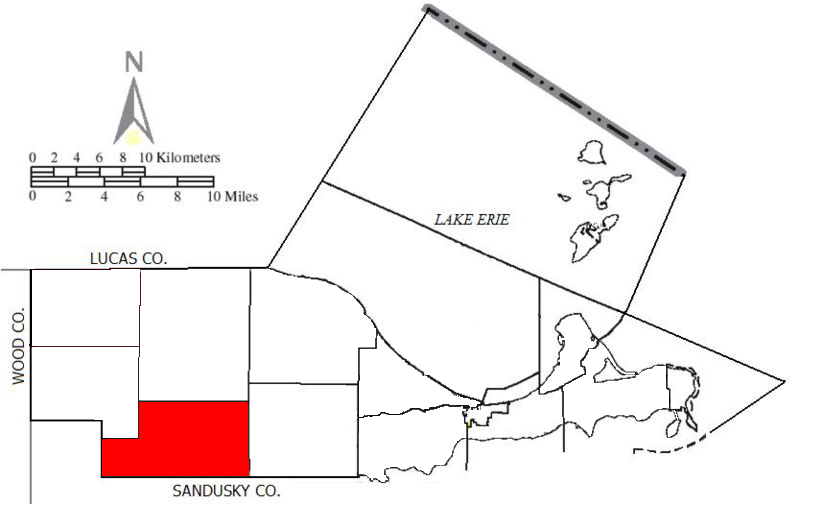
- Location of Harris Township in Ottawa County
- Coordinates: 41°28′42″N 83°16′11″W
- Country: United States
- State: Ohio
- County: Ottawa

Area
  - Total: 28.4 sq mi (73.5 km^{2})
  - Land: 28.2 sq mi (73.1 km^{2})
  - Water: 0.15 sq mi (0.4 km^{2})
- Elevation: 610 ft (186 m)

Population (2020)
  - Total: 2,910
  - Density: 103/sq mi (39.8/km^{2})
- Time zone: UTC-5 (Eastern (EST))
  - Summer (DST): UTC-4 (EDT)
- FIPS code: 39-33726
- GNIS feature ID: 1086762
- Website: https://www.harristownshipohio.com/

Harris Township is one of the twelve townships of Ottawa County, Ohio, United States. The 2020 census found 2,910 people in the township.

== Geography ==
Located in the southwestern part of the county, it borders the following townships:

- Benton Township - north
- Salem Township - east
- Rice Township, Sandusky County - southeast corner
- Washington Township, Sandusky County - south
- Woodville Township, Sandusky County - southwest
- Clay Township - northwest

Most of the village of Elmore is located in the western part of the township.

The Portage River and the Ohio Turnpike also pass through Harris Township.

== Name and history ==
It is the only Harris Township statewide.

== Government ==
The township is governed by a three-member board of trustees, who are elected in November of odd-numbered years to a four-year term beginning on the following January 1. Two are elected in the year after the presidential election and one is elected in the year before it. There is also an elected township fiscal officer, who serves a four-year term beginning on April 1 of the year after the election, which is held in November of the year before the presidential election. Vacancies in the fiscal officership or on the board of trustees are filled by the remaining trustees.
