= Woodville Township, Sandusky County, Ohio =

Township in Ohio, US

- Township
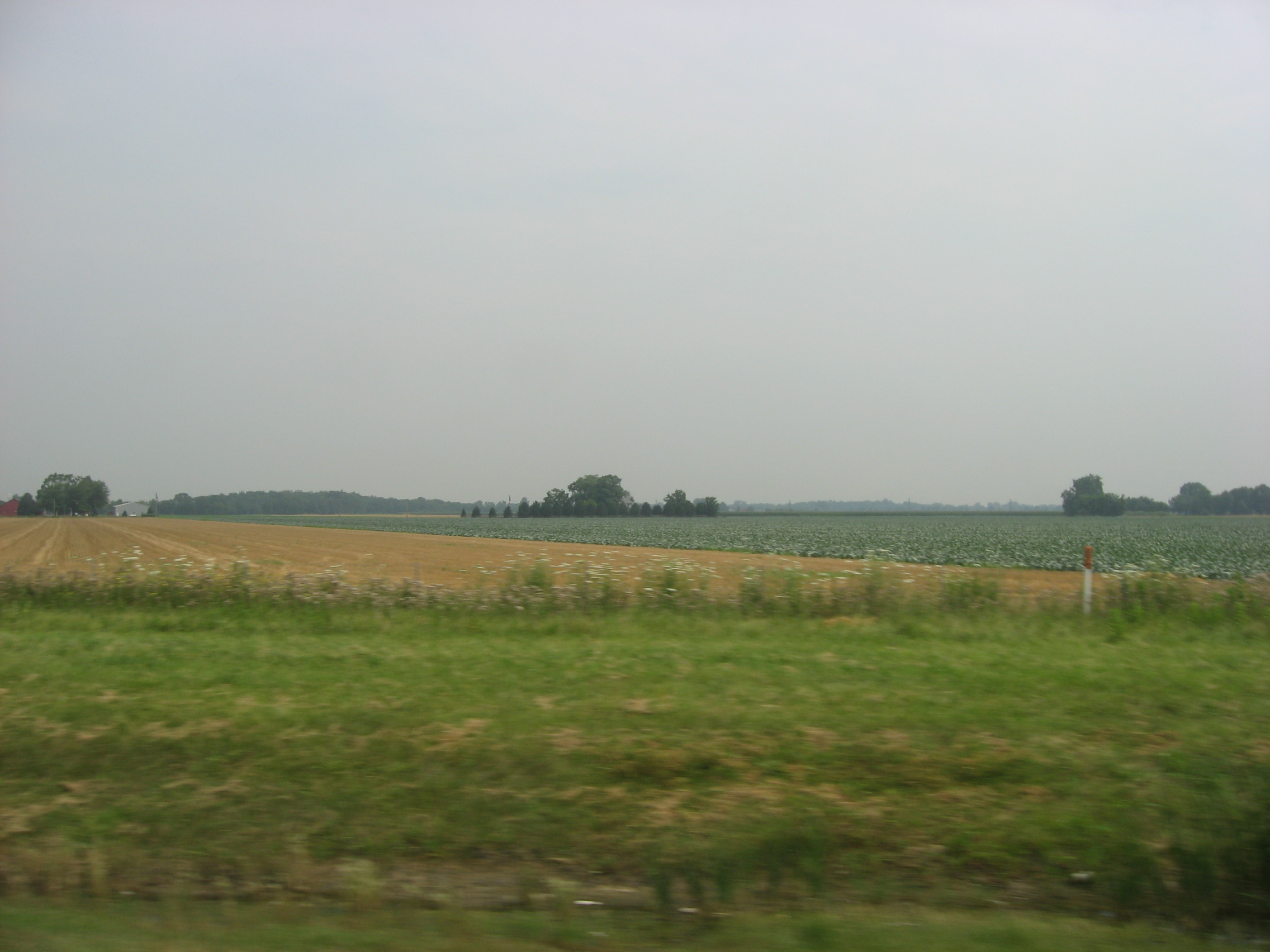
- Fields in Woodville Township's northern panhandle

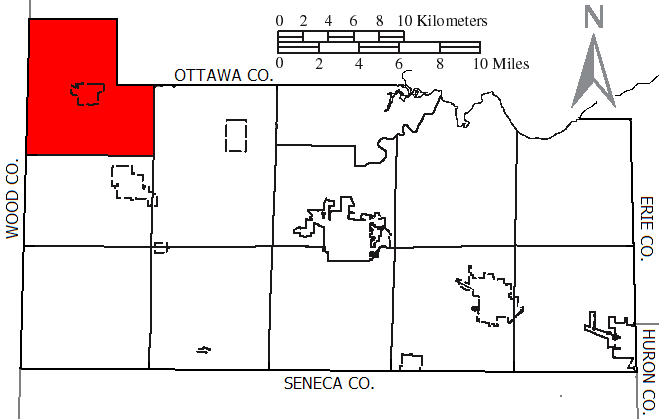
- Location of Woodville Township, Sandusky County, Ohio
- Coordinates: 41°27′2″N 83°21′44″W
- Country: United States
- State: Ohio
- County: Sandusky

Area
  - Total: 33.2 sq mi (86.0 km^{2})
  - Land: 33.1 sq mi (85.8 km^{2})
  - Water: 0.039 sq mi (0.1 km^{2})
- Elevation: 640 ft (195 m)

Population (2020)
  - Total: 3,303
  - Density: 100/sq mi (38.5/km^{2})
- Time zone: UTC-5 (Eastern (EST))
  - Summer (DST): UTC-4 (EDT)
- ZIP code: 43469
- Area code: 419
- FIPS code: 39-86506
- GNIS feature ID: 1086920

Woodville Township is one of the twelve townships of Sandusky County, Ohio, United States. As of the 2020 census, 3,303 people lived in the township

== Geography ==
Located in the northwestern corner of the county, it borders the following townships:

- Clay Township, Ottawa County - north
- Harris Township, Ottawa County - northeast
- Washington Township - east
- Madison Township - south
- Freedom Township, Wood County - southwest
- Troy Township, Wood County - west

The village of Woodville is located in central Woodville Township.

== Name and history ==
Woodville Township was organized in 1840. It was named for Amos E. Wood, a member of Congress.

It is the only Woodville Township statewide.

== Government ==
The township is governed by a three-member board of trustees, who are elected in November of odd-numbered years to a four-year term beginning on the following January 1. Two are elected in the year after the presidential election and one is elected in the year before it. There is also an elected township fiscal officer, who serves a four-year term beginning on April 1 of the year after the election, which is held in November of the year before the presidential election. Vacancies in the fiscal officership or on the board of trustees are filled by the remaining trustees.
