= Erie Township, Ohio =

Township in Ohio, US

Erie Township, Ottawa County, Ohio
- Township
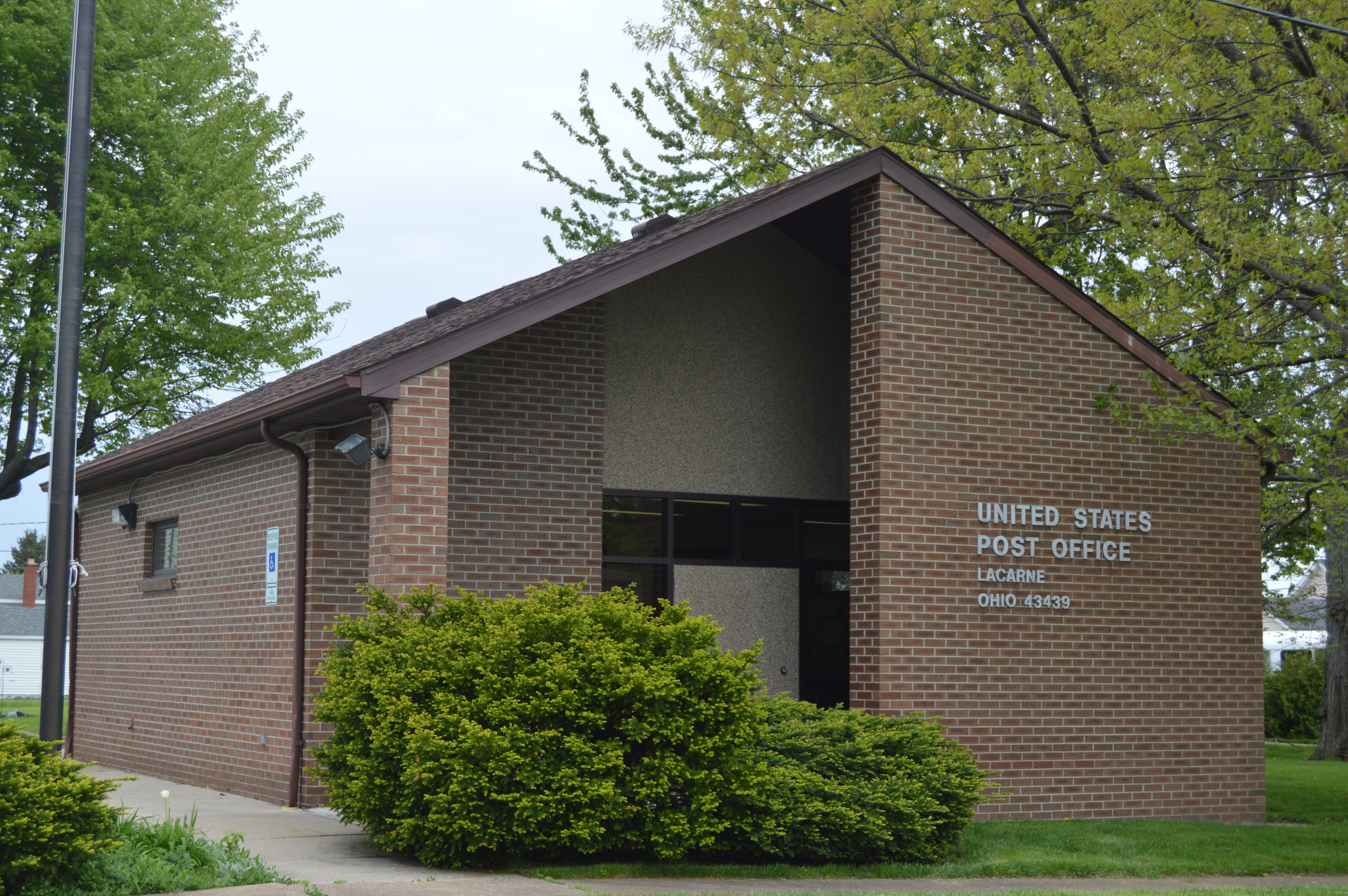
- Post office at Lacarne

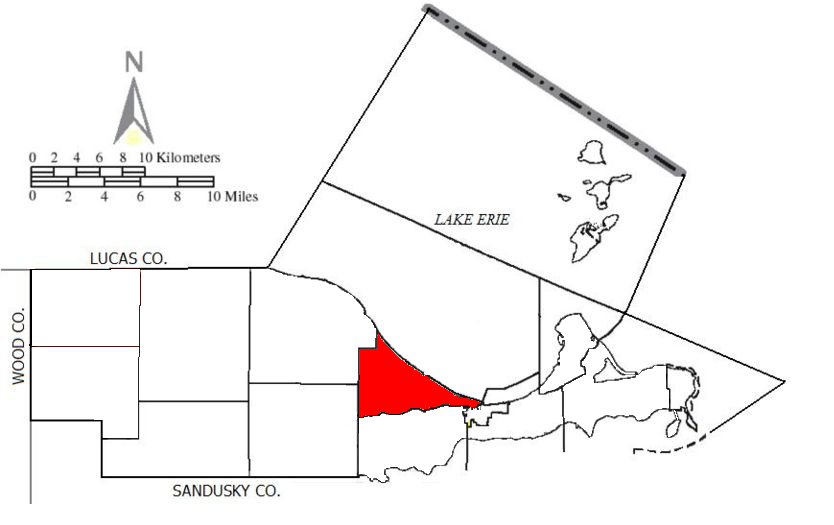
- Location of Erie Township in Ottawa County.
- Coordinates: 41°32′4″N 83°1′31″W
- Country: United States
- State: Ohio
- County: Ottawa

Area
  - Total: 13.7 sq mi (35.4 km^{2})
  - Land: 12.3 sq mi (31.8 km^{2})
  - Water: 1.4 sq mi (3.6 km^{2})
- Elevation: 577 ft (176 m)

Population (2020)
  - Total: 1,147
  - Density: 93/sq mi (36.1/km^{2})
- Time zone: UTC-5 (Eastern (EST))
  - Summer (DST): UTC-4 (EDT)
- FIPS code: 39-25578
- GNIS feature ID: 1086761

Erie Township is one of the twelve townships of Ottawa County, Ohio, United States. The 2020 census found 1,147 people in the township.

== Geography ==
Located in the central part of the county along Lake Erie, it borders the following townships:

- Put-in-Bay Township - northeast, across Lake Erie
- Portage Township - southeast
- Bay Township - south
- Salem Township - southwest
- Carroll Township - northwest

A small part of the city of Port Clinton, the county seat of Ottawa County, is located in southwestern Erie Township, and the unincorporated community of Lacarne lies in the township's southwest.

Camp Perry is located along Lake Erie in Erie Township.

== Name and history ==
It is the only Erie Township statewide.

== Government ==
The township is governed by a three-member board of trustees, who are elected in November of odd-numbered years to a four-year term beginning on the following January 1. Two are elected in the year after the presidential election and one is elected in the year before it. There is also an elected township fiscal officer, who serves a four-year term beginning on April 1 of the year after the election, which is held in November of the year before the presidential election. Vacancies in the fiscal officership or on the board of trustees are filled by the remaining trustees.
