= Benton Township, Ottawa County, Ohio =

Township in Ohio, US

- Township
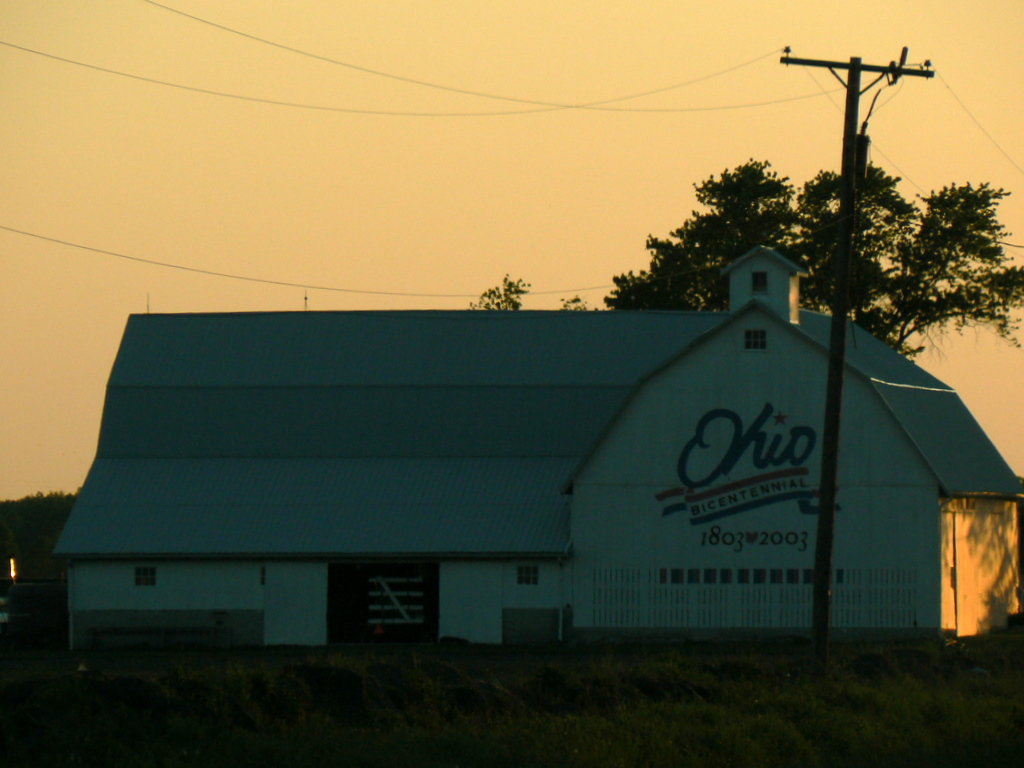
- Bicentennial barn on Route 2 at Grodis Corner

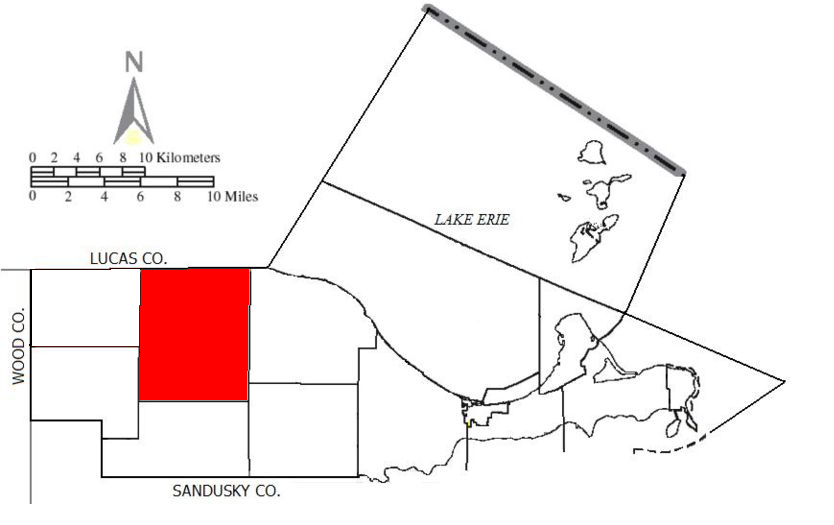
- Location of Benton Township in Ottawa County.
- Coordinates: 41°34′1″N 83°14′46″W
- Country: United States
- State: Ohio
- County: Ottawa

Government
  - Type: 3 Member Board of Trustees

Area
  - Total: 44.4 sq mi (115.1 km^{2})
  - Land: 44.2 sq mi (114.5 km^{2})
  - Water: 0.23 sq mi (0.6 km^{2})
- Elevation: 594 ft (181 m)

Population (2020)
  - Total: 2,449
  - Density: 55.40/sq mi (21.39/km^{2})
- Time zone: UTC-5 (Eastern (EST))
  - Summer (DST): UTC-4 (EDT)
- FIPS code: 39-05620
- GNIS feature ID: 1086756
- Website: www.bentontownship.org

Benton Township is one of the twelve townships of Ottawa County, Ohio, United States. The 2020 census found 2,449 people in the township.

== Geography ==
Located in the northwestern part of the county, it borders the following townships:

- Jerusalem Township, Lucas County - north
- Carroll Township - east
- Salem Township - southeast
- Harris Township - south
- Clay Township - southwest
- Allen Township - northwest

The village of Rocky Ridge lies in the southeastern part of the township, and the unincorporated community of Graytown lies in the township's southwest.

Benton Township is also the location of the Ottawa National Wildlife Refuge and Crane Creek State Park.

== Name and history ==
Statewide, other Benton Townships are located in Hocking, Monroe, Paulding, and Pike counties.

== Government ==
The township is governed by a three-member board of trustees, who are elected in November of odd-numbered years to a four-year term beginning on the following January 1. Two are elected in the year after the presidential election and one is elected in the year before it. There is also an elected township fiscal officer, who serves a four-year term beginning on April 1 of the year after the election, which is held in November of the year before the presidential election. Vacancies in the fiscal officer or on the board of trustees are filled by the remaining trustees.
