= Portage River (Ohio) =

Coordinates: 41.5164°N 82.9371°W

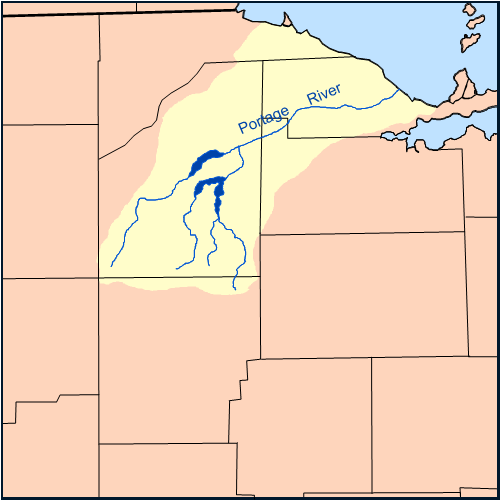
Map of the Portage River watershed.

The Portage River branches run northeast from Wood County & north from Hancock County to Pemberville in eastern Wood County, where it becomes one river, then into Sandusky County, and meanders across Ottawa County through Elmore & Oak Harbor before it empties into Lake Erie at what is now Port Clinton. It most likely derives its name from early explorers who were forced to portage or carry their canoes and boats around the river's intermittent shallows and rapids. It is approximately 41.5 miles (66.8 km) in length.

Native Americans were the first to use the river as a food source and for transportation. In 1782, a trader wrote to a merchant in Detroit, "it is expected there will be two French traders at or near Little Island or the Portash [sic] River."

In 1850 the Ohio legislature passed the first of several laws mandating the draining of the Great Black Swamp into the Portage and Maumee rivers. This led to the creation of many of the tributaries, streams, and ditches feeding the Portage River.

Drainage system changes have caused the Portage River to shift the location of its mouth at least twice in the past three hundred years. Maps recorded in 1754 show the mouth near the present location of Ottawa National Wildlife Refuge. Prior to that, the river emptied into Lake Erie near West Harbor.

Despite its shallow depth, the river is relatively clean, reaching 76 percent of Ohio EPA standards. Environmental concerns include nonpoint pollution sources, inappropriate land use, and sewage discharge. Due to PCB contamination, the Ohio EPA recommends no more than one meal per month of channel catfish and common carp caught in the Portage River.

== Gallery ==
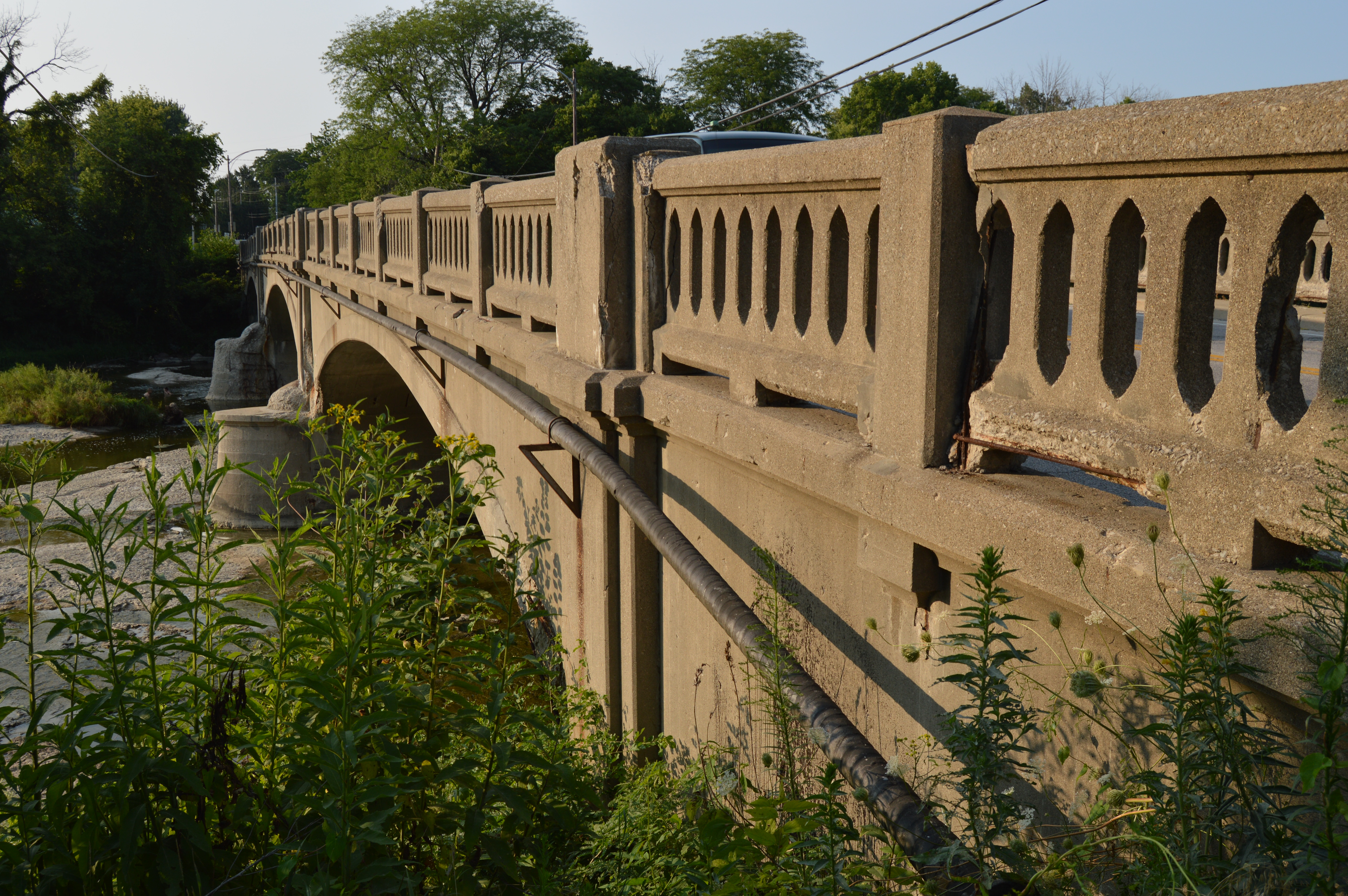
Portage River bridge at Elmore

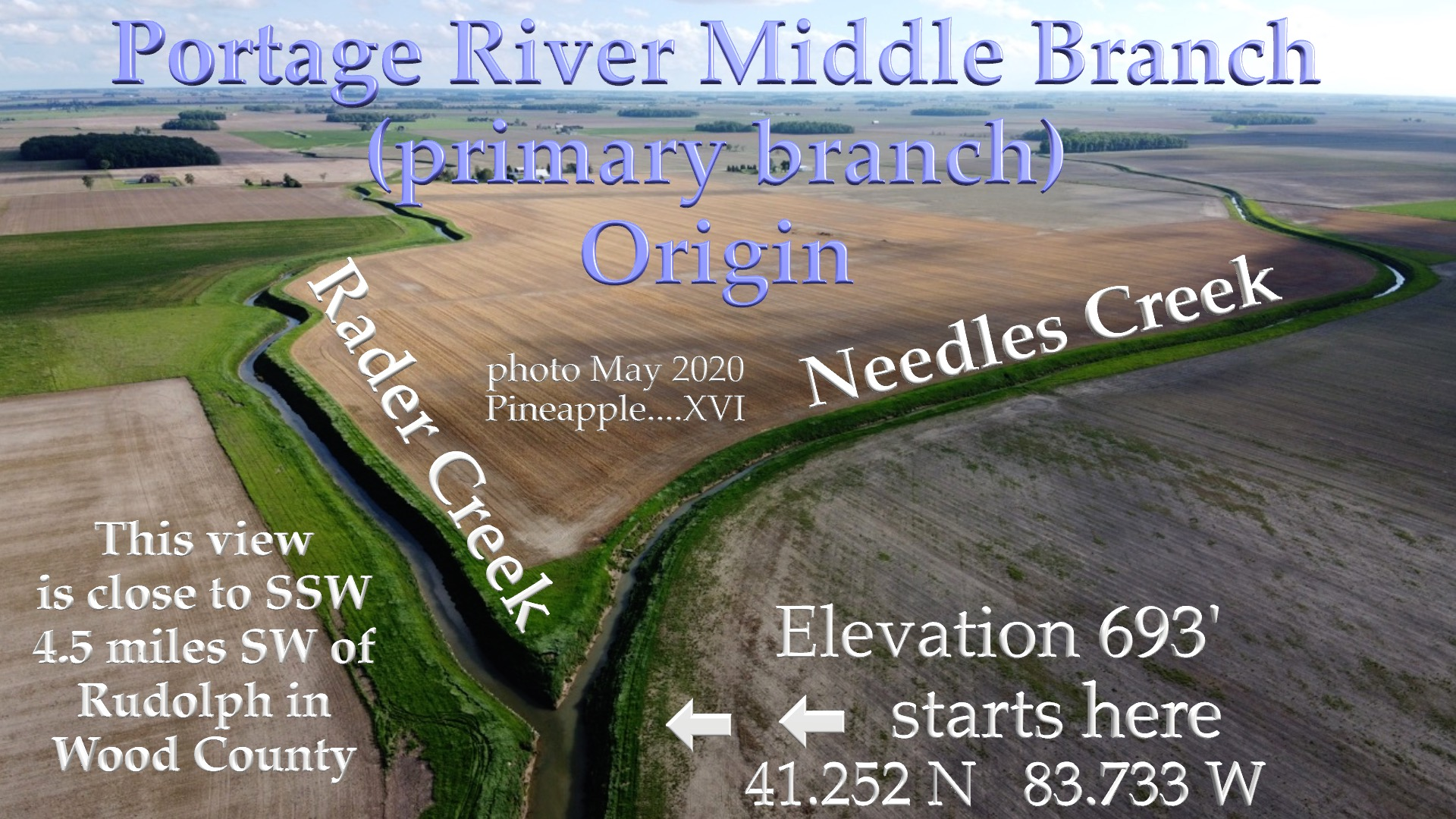
Portage middle branch sources

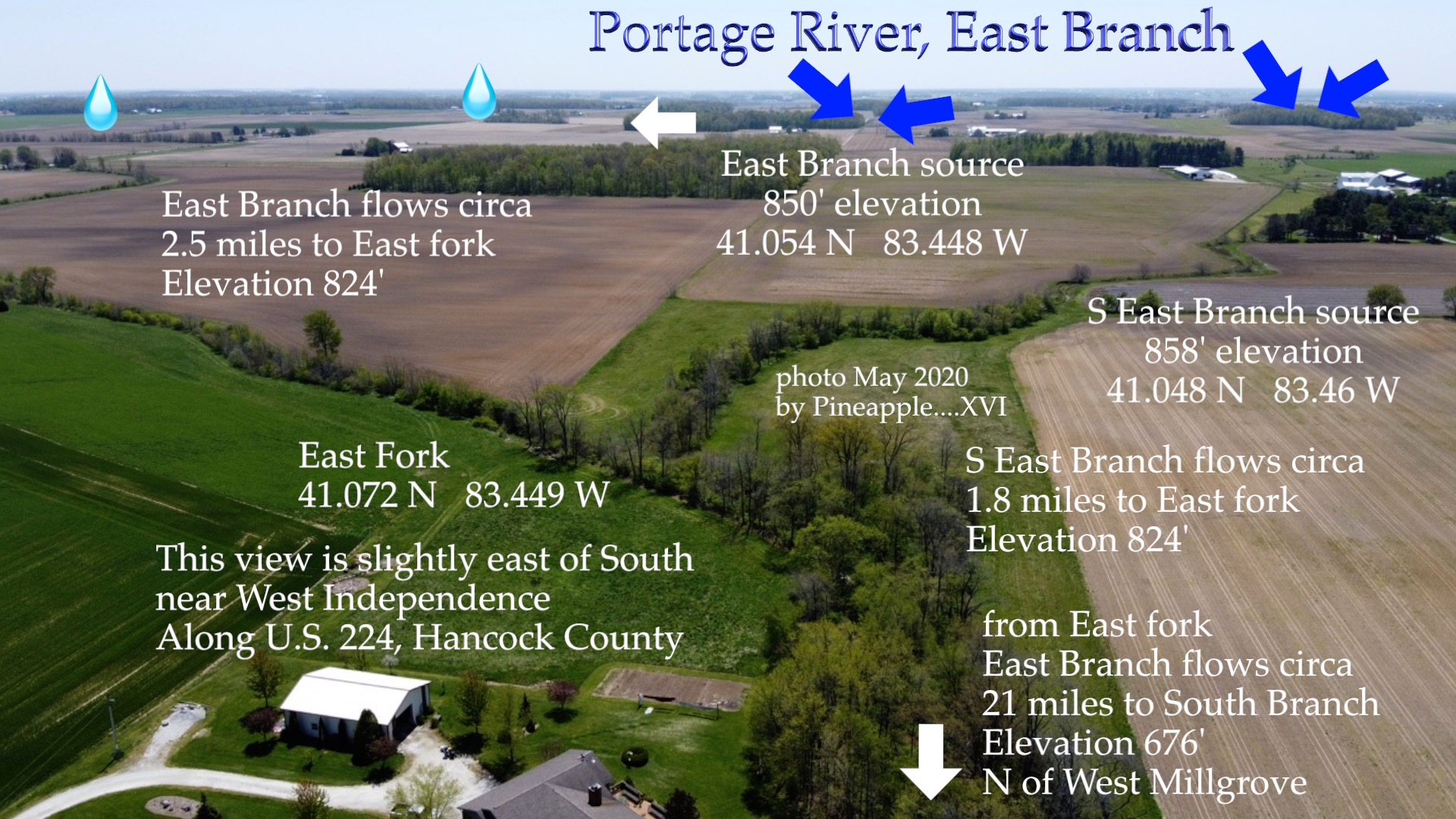
East branch sources

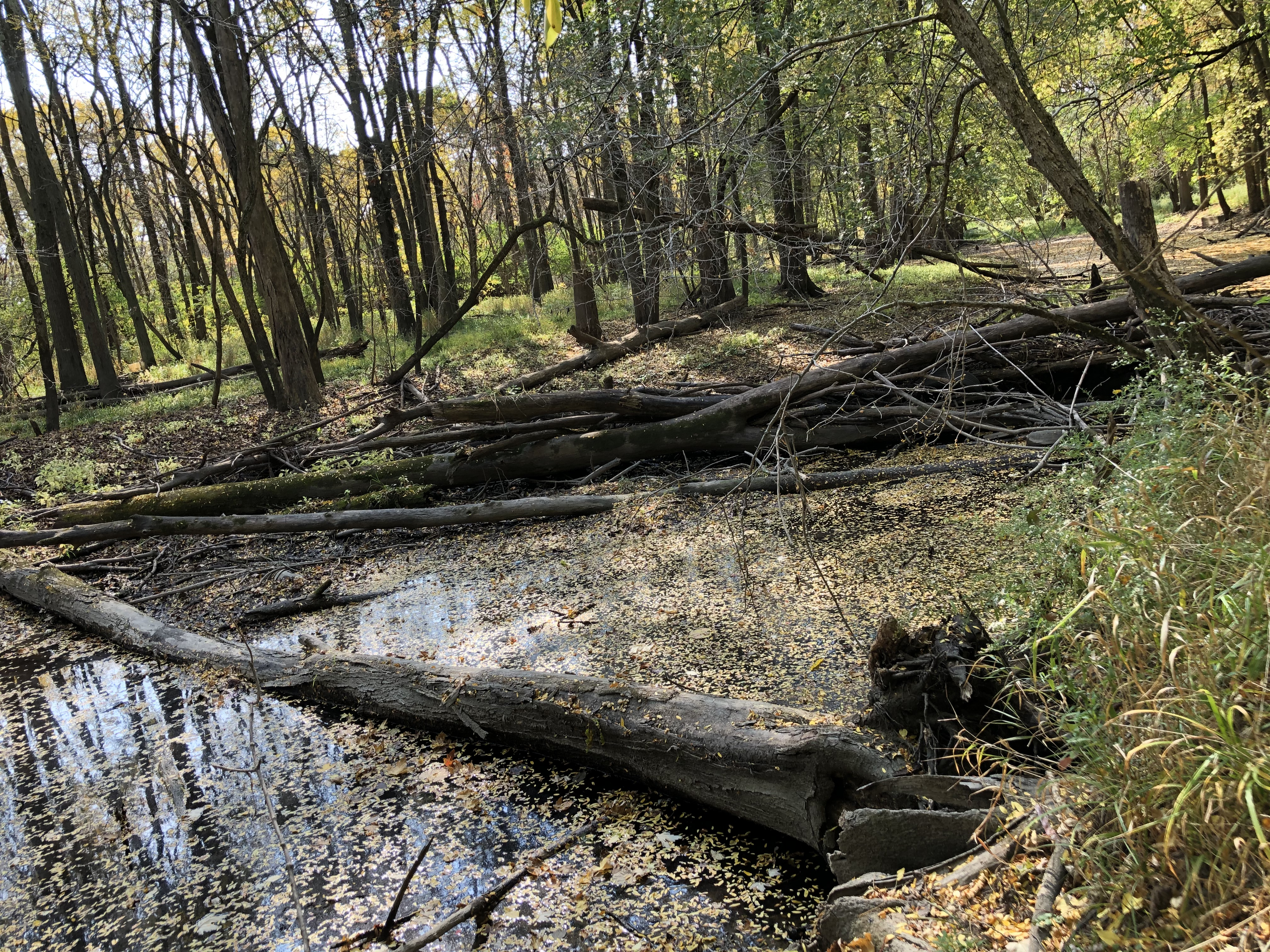
Northern branch of the Portage River, at the nature trail at the Wood County Museum.

== See also ==
- List of rivers of Ohio
