= Elmore, Ohio =

- Village
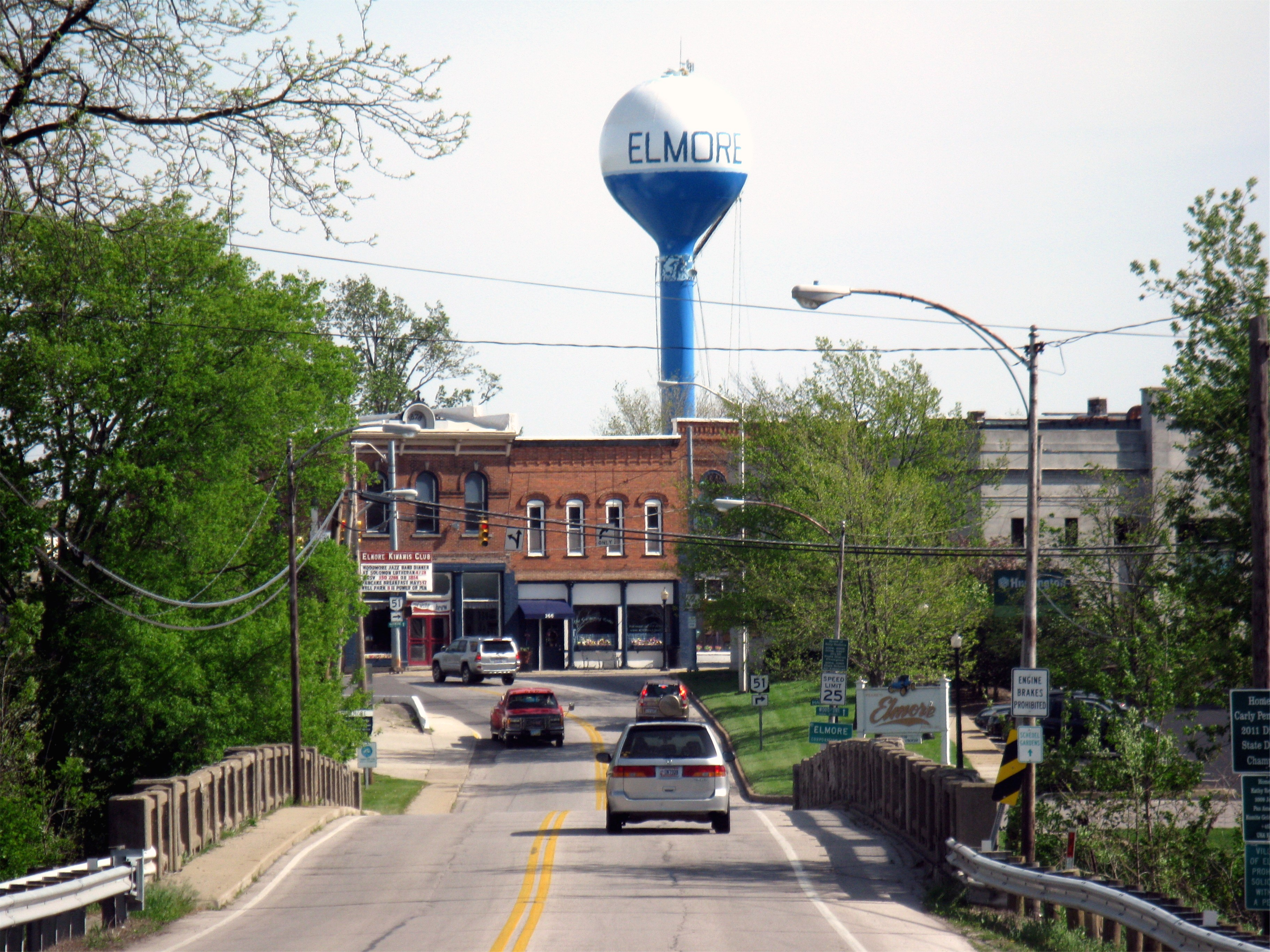
- Elmore in 2012

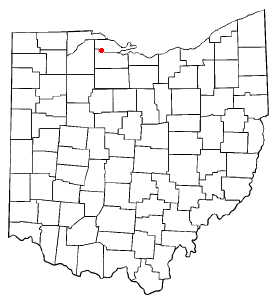
- Location of Elmore, Ohio

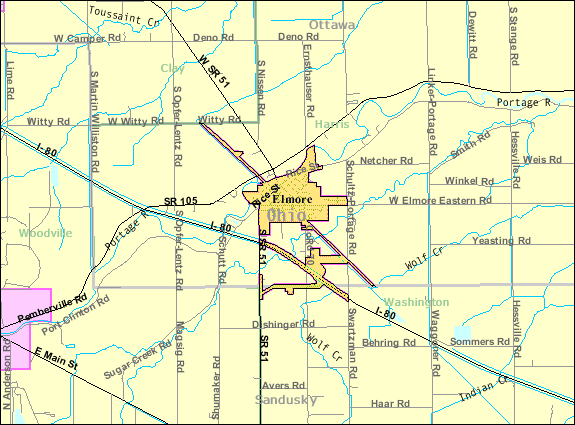
- Detailed map of Elmore
- Coordinates: 41°28′14″N 83°17′28″W
- Country: United States
- State: Ohio
- Counties: Ottawa, Sandusky

Government
  - Mayor: Thomas Jackson

Area
  - Total: 0.82 sq mi (2.13 km^{2})
  - Land: 0.82 sq mi (2.13 km^{2})
  - Water: 0 sq mi (0.00 km^{2})
- Elevation: 617 ft (188 m)

Population (2020)
  - Total: 1,370
  - Estimate (2023): 1,374
  - Density: 1,665.5/sq mi (643.07/km^{2})
- Time zone: UTC-5 (Eastern (EST))
  - Summer (DST): UTC-4 (EDT)
- ZIP code: 43416
- Area code: 419
- FIPS code: 39-25144
- GNIS feature ID: 2398815
- Website: https://village.elmore.oh.us/

Elmore is a village in Ottawa and Sandusky counties in the U.S. state of Ohio. The population was 1,370 at the 2020 census.

The Ottawa County portion of Elmore is part of the Toledo Metropolitan Area, while the Sandusky County portion is part of the Fremont, Ohio micropolitan area.

== History ==
Elmore is located in what used to be known as the Black Swamp, a sprawling area of marsh that covered the majority of northwest Ohio, and was primarily inhabited by Native Americans until the 19th century. It is believed that the Portage River, which runs alongside the village, most likely derives its name from early explorers who were forced to portage or carry their canoes and boats around the river's intermittent shallows and rapids. German settlers during the first half of the 1800s began the long process of draining the land and clear cutting the dense forest exposing the nutrient rich soil, which, along with a once thriving railroad, provided the foundation for the village’s early growth and development. Elmore was surveyed and platted on October 2, 1851. The land surrounding Elmore is tabletop flat. Several sawmills in the vicinity provided the badly needed "planks" (boards) for the muddy "plank road", designated as U.S. Route 20, between Fremont, Ohio and Perrysburg, Ohio. The Ohio Turnpike replaced US 20 as the main avenue across northern Ohio, but US 20 is still widely used. The building of the Turnpike in the 1950s affected every town along US 20, illustrated by abandoned motels and restaurants along its course.

Elmore was the site of the original manufacture of the Elmore automobile, one of the first companies bought up by W.C. Durant to form General Motors, until the factory was relocated to Clyde. The nearby beryllium plant is a key player in nuclear power, nuclear weaponry, and space program technology.

Present-day Elmore is a small community with a business district that has struggled to achieve success in recent years. The New York Central railroad has been gone for many decades, and the village has faced challenges related to a decreased transportation role after construction of the Ohio Turnpike, which bypassed the village. However, the increasing ease of modern travel and the construction of a Turnpike interchange in 1997 have created new opportunities for the village. Many locals commute to Toledo or other near-by cities and towns for work while the village promotes itself as a place for others to play. In recent years, the presence of several new stores has brought some success to the downtown area as a destination and village leaders have attempted to cultivate that image with various measures such as old-fashioned street posts and a refurbished train depot. In recent years, the annual Portage River Festival, various other local events, and a fairly well known headless motorcycle-riding ghost are what tend to bring people into the area.

In 2011, Elmore attracted national news coverage for its unique mayoral race featuring incumbent Lowell Krumnow and his older brother, Councilman James Krumnow.

== Geography ==
According to the United States Census Bureau, the village has a total area of 0.81 square miles (2.10 km^{2}), all land.

== Demographics ==
Historical population
Census	Pop.	Note	%±
1870	1,131		—
1880	1,044		−7.7%
1890	1,198		14.8%
1900	1,025		−14.4%
1910	937		−8.6%
1920	937		0.0%
1930	1,107		18.1%
1940	1,103		−0.4%
1950	1,215		10.2%
1960	1,302		7.2%
1970	1,316		1.1%
1980	1,271		−3.4%
1990	1,334		5.0%
2000	1,426		6.9%
2010	1,410		−1.1%
2020	1,370		−2.8%
2023 (est.)	1,374	▲	0.3%
U.S. Decennial Census

=== 2010 census ===
As of the census of 2010, there were 1,410 people, 558 households, and 389 families living in the village. The population density was 1,740.7 inhabitants per square mile (672.1/km^{2}). There were 592 housing units at an average density of 730.9 per square mile (282.2/km^{2}). The racial makeup of the village was 96.4% White, 0.5% African American, 0.2% Native American, 0.1% Asian, 0.6% from other races, and 2.1% from two or more races. Hispanic or Latino of any race were 5.7% of the population.

There were 558 households, of which 33.0% had children under the age of 18 living with them, 58.4% were married couples living together, 8.6% had a female householder with no husband present, 2.7% had a male householder with no wife present, and 30.3% were non-families. 27.8% of all households were made up of individuals, and 15.4% had someone living alone who was 65 years of age or older. The average household size was 2.53 and the average family size was 3.08.

The median age in the village was 38.6 years. 27.2% of residents were under the age of 18; 6% were between the ages of 18 and 24; 25.5% were from 25 to 44; 24.2% were from 45 to 64; and 17% were 65 years of age or older. The gender makeup of the village was 48.7% male and 51.3% female.

=== 2000 census ===
As of the census of 2000, there were 1,426 people, 588 households, and 406 families living in the village. The population density was 1,716.6 inhabitants per square mile (662.8/km^{2}). There were 606 housing units at an average density of 729.5 per square mile (281.7/km^{2}). The racial makeup of the village was 97.48% White, 0.14% African American, 0.28% Native American, 1.47% from other races, and 0.63% from two or more races. Hispanic or Latino of any race were 4.28% of the population.

There were 588 households, out of which 32.8% had children under the age of 18 living with them, 57.1% were married couples living together, 9.5% had a female householder with no husband present, and 30.8% were non-families. 28.4% of all households were made up of individuals, and 18.0% had someone living alone who was 65 years of age or older. The average household size was 2.43 and the average family size was 2.98.

In the village, the population was spread out, with 26.3% under the age of 18, 7.3% from 18 to 24, 29.0% from 25 to 44, 20.8% from 45 to 64, and 16.6% who were 65 years of age or older. The median age was 38 years. For every 100 females there were 88.9 males. For every 100 females age 18 and over, there were 84.7 males.

The median income for a household in the village was $40,172, and the median income for a family was $48,550. Males had a median income of $38,958 versus $24,688 for females. The per capita income for the village was $18,786. About 3.5% of families and 5.5% of the population were below the poverty line, including 7.4% of those under age 18 and 4.5% of those age 65 or over.

== Arts and culture ==
Elmore is home to Schedel Arboretum and Gardens, the former Victorian estate of a local (limestone) quarry magnate and is now a botanical preserve.

The Portage River, which passes alongside the village, plays an important recreational role in the community. Both Walter Ory Park and Riverbend Park stand along the banks of the river and offer the community additional sources of recreation.

== Education ==
Woodmore Local Schools operates one elementary school, one middle school, and Woodmore High School.

The village has a public library, the Harris-Elmore Library.

== Notable people ==
- Clara Blinn, kidnapping victim
