= Clyde cancer cluster =

Childhood cancer cluster in and around Clyde, Ohio, U.S.

The Clyde cancer cluster was a childhood cancer cluster located in and around Clyde, Ohio, United States. The cluster was classified by the Ohio Department of Health in 2009. In an 11-year interval, ten childhood cancers were documented in an area where 5.3 were expected, and four pediatric brain and central nervous system cancers were reported, in an area where 0.92 were expected. According to the ODH, the odds of this happening without a common cause are less than 1 in 20. No known commonality exists between the cases, and despite years of investigation no cause has been found.

After the Ohio Environmental Protection Agency carried out soil tests in the Whirlpool Corporation's former corporate park, Whirlpool Park, in Green Springs, Ohio, it was apparent that soil on the property contained polychlorinated biphenyls. Whirlpool Corporation faced two lawsuits, perhaps the most notable one being Brown v. Whirlpool Corporation, of which the main plaintiff was Wendy Brown, as the park is perhaps the most well known suspected cause of the cluster. This lawsuit was dismissed in 2014, and the other, Sandusky County v. Whirlpool Corporation, was withdrawn in 2015. In January 2016, the EPA reported that Whirlpool Park had been cleared of PCB contamination.

== Early investigation ==
In 2006, the Ohio Department of Health recognized that the incidence of child cancer cases in the Clyde area was abnormally high, and in 2007, the Ohio Environmental Protection Agency started investigating possible causes. Many community members became angry because of what they perceived as little progress made by the agency throughout this series of investigations. The lack of possible causes found during the early investigations of the cluster was a source of continuing worry for the affected community.

In December 2009, at a meeting with affected families, the Department of Health and the Environmental Protection Agency distributed a map of the area pinpointing the locations of the homes of children who had cancer.

== Whirlpool Corporation investigation ==
In late 2011 and early 2012, over a period of several months, the Environmental Protection Agency tested soil in several different parts of Clyde and surrounding areas. In late July 2012, investigators found polychlorinated biphenyls, which is a probable human carcinogen, in the soil of the property that was formerly known as Whirlpool Park, a recreational park that was owned by the Whirlpool Corporation until the park was shut down in 2008. This park, located near Green Springs, Ohio, consisted of a pool, children's playing equipment, and a basketball court, and the property was apparently used as a dumping ground for this toxic waste. The agency investigated Clyde's Whirlpool plant further, and found no other Whirlpool facilities in Clyde containing any illegal chemical substances.

On March 28, 2013, a $750 million class action lawsuit was filed against Whirlpool, other companies suspected of also dumping toxic waste at the park, and the family who currently owns the property that was formerly Whirlpool Park. This lawsuit, Wendy Brown, et al. v. Whirlpool Corporation, consisted of 27 plaintiffs, including both Wendy and Warren Brown. The amount sought was for the expenses of cleaning the houses containing benzaldehyde and for cleaning the park, as well as the damage the cluster caused altogether. The lawsuit was dismissed without prejudice, at the plaintiffs' request, in early 2015 with no reason given. Whirlpool promised to rid the property of all toxic waste in August 2015.

== Community actions ==
Throughout the late 2000s and early 2010s, many citizens of Clyde, and of Ohio in general, held fundraisers, gave donations, and helped maintain memories of those who died in the cluster. Several documentaries by citizens of Clyde were created that centered around personal experiences with cancer and the effects it had on the Clyde community. In 2015, the president of the City of Clyde Landscape Committee, Bev Henson, formed a private committee to work on the Clyde Children's Memorial. It is a marble memorial with the names of the victims engraved on the top of seven pedestal marble, arranged in a circle around a lower center stone inscribed with the phrase "Remember Our Children". The memorial was unveiled to the public in 2017. It is set across from the gazebo and along the bike trail west of maple street.

== See also ==
- List of cancer clusters
