= Clyde Elementary School =

Clyde Elementary School is the name of several elementary schools in the United States. These include:

- Clyde Elementary School (North Carolina), in Clyde, North Carolina
- Clyde Elementary School (Ohio), in Clyde, Ohio

== See also ==
- Clyde High School (disambiguation)
- Clyde Campbell Elementary School, in Hickory, North Carolina
