= Green Springs Elementary School =

Green Springs Elementary School is the name of two elementary schools in the United States. These include:

- Green Springs Elementary School (Kansas), in Olathe, Kansas
- Green Springs Elementary School (Ohio), in Green Springs, Ohio
