= List of cancer clusters =

This is a list of cancer clusters. A cancer cluster is a statistical event, which may or may not have a cause other than chance. There are other cancer clusters that occur without any obvious source of carcinogens.

North America
Date	Disease	Location	Number of cases	Cause	References
1917–1927	Osteosarcoma	New Jersey, Connecticut, Illinois	86	Radium	
1938–1971	Adenocarcinoma	U.S.	750	Diethylstilbestrol	
?–2018	Various cancers	St. Louis, Missouri	56	Uranium	
1967–1973	Liver angiosarcoma (Hemangiosarcoma)	Louisville, Kentucky	4	Vinyl chloride monomer	
1968–1995	Leukemia, Lymphoma	Camp Lejeune, North Carolina	13 (Note: Out of 106 suspected health problems, 52 were confirmed, including 13 hematopoietic cancers and 39 birth defects.)	Trichloroethylene; 1,2-Dichloroethylene; Tetrachloroethylene; Methylene chloride Vinyl chloride Main article: Camp Lejeune water contamination	
1979–1996	Brain, CNS cancer	Toms River, New Jersey	90+	SAN trimer Styrene; Acrylonitrile	
1973–1986	Leukemia	Woburn, Massachusetts	21	Chloroform; Tetrachloroethylene; Trichloroethylene; 1,2-Dichloroethene; Arsenic	
1982–1984	Testicular cancer	Fulton County, New York	3	Dimethylformamide (DMF); 2-Ethoxyethanol; 2-Ethoxyethyl acetate 2-Butoxyethanol	
1987–1999	Brain cancer, Leukemia, Lymphoma	Wilmington, Massachusetts	20	Unknown; N-Nitrosodimethylamine (NDMA)	
1993–2008	Childhood brain cancer, brain tumors, colon cancer, anal cancer, rectal cancer, breast cancer. Also nervous system damaged.	The Acreage, Florida	Unknown	Unknown; Some have linked it to a nearby Pratt and Whitney, Beach Aggregates, and the Florida crystals.	
1997–2002	Leukemia, rhabdomyosarcoma	Fallon, Nevada	17	Unknown; Tungsten; Arsenic; Chlorpyrifos; Dichlorodiphenyldichloroethylene (DDE); Benzene in jet fuel	
1996–2013	Leukemia, brain tumors, lymphoma, other forms	Clyde, Ohio	36, mostly children	Unknown Main article: Clyde cancer cluster	
1953–2010	Wide range of cancers	Shannon, Quebec	400	Trichloroethylene	
2009-2024	Wide range of cancers, predominantly breast cancer	Raleigh, NC	99	Aroclor 1262, a commercial mixture of polychlorinated biphenyl (PCB) compounds	37
Europe
Date	Disease	Location	Number of cases	Cause	References
1968–1995	Leukemia	Seascale, Sellafield, England	9	Unsure; Studies indicate a correlation with paternal preconceptional irradiation (PPI)	
1978–1993	Leukemia	La Hague, Normandy, France	27	Unknown; Speculated to be tritium	
1980s	Leukemia, brain tumors	East Yorkshire, England	13	Polonium-210, lead, arsenic and other metal emitter; unproven link to Capper Pass tin smelter in Melton	
1990–2005	Leukemia	Elbmarsch, Lower Saxony and Krümmel (Kruemmel), Geesthacht, Schleswig-Holstein in Germany	16	Unknown; Speculated to be actinide, especially plutonium-241 of unknown origin that was found in the area or tritium from a nearby nuclear power plant See also: Elbmarsch § Cancer cluster	
India
Date	Disease	Location	Number of cases	Cause	References
mid 1980s	Skin lesions, arsenicosis	West Bengal, India	Unknown	Arsenic	
