= Thaddeus B. Hurd =

American architect & historian (1903–1989)

Thaddeus Baker Hurd
- Born: October 23, 1903; Clyde, Ohio
- Died: March 12, 1989 (aged 85); Toledo, Ohio
- Education: Clyde High School (graduated 1920), Oberlin College (1920—1922), Cornell University (1923—1927, 1929)
- Occupations: Architect, historian, educator
- Known for: Research on the history of Clyde, Ohio
- Parents: Herman Hurd (father); Jennie Hurd (mother)
- Relatives: Hiram Hurd (brother)

Thaddeus Baker Hurd (October 23, 1903 – March 12, 1989) was an architect and historian who is known for his interest and extensive research in the history of the city of Clyde, Ohio, United States. Hurd had several jobs in the field of architecture until his retirement in 1967. He was the founder of the Clyde Heritage League, a historical society. His work was contributed to several museums and libraries.

== Background ==
Hurd was born on October 23, 1903, in Clyde, Ohio. He was the son of Herman and Jennie Hurd. Herman was a local grocer and was a good friend of Sherwood Anderson, who is well known especially in Clyde for his novel Winesburg, Ohio.

Hurd graduated from Clyde High School in 1920, and attended Oberlin College in Oberlin for two years after graduation. In 1922, he returned to Clyde and taught in a public school for one year. In 1923, Hurd moved to Ithaca, New York for a bachelor's degree, and later a Master of Architecture, from the Cornell University College of Architecture, Art, and Planning. From 1930 to 1933, Hurd was a professor of architecture at Cornell.

== Architectural career ==
Before attending graduate school at Cornell, Hurd moved to Pittsburgh, Pennsylvania, to work at an architecture firm for one year. After achieving his Master of Architecture degree, Hurd obtained several New Deal architectural jobs, which mostly took place in Raleigh, North Carolina, until 1944. He then moved to Detroit, Michigan, for a career at the Great Lakes Steel Corporation, a major steel producer at the time. In 1949, Hurd returned to Ohio to join the Toledo architectural firm Britsch and Munger. He worked at this firm until 1955, when he worked as a self-employed architect until he retired in 1967.

== Historical research ==
Hurd moved back to Clyde during his retirement, and had a large interest in the history of the city. Earlier, in 1957, Hurd was a prominent figure in the reestablishment of the Sandusky County Historical Society. In 1975, he established the Clyde Heritage League, a historical society and the parent organization of several museums in Clyde. He was also a member of several other historical societies in the Clyde area and across the state of Ohio. Hurd is best known in the city for his collection and preservation of information and genealogical data as well as thousands of historic pictures, documents, and other items. Collections of his research are kept in several local museums and libraries.

A great portion of his research focused on notable residents of Clyde, mainly Sherwood Anderson, the author of the 1919 short story cycle Winesburg, Ohio, which was based on Clyde, and on James B. McPherson, a career United States Army officer who served as a General in the Union Army during the American Civil War. Anderson maintained a somewhat negative reputation in Clyde in the 20th century because his realistic novel Winesburg, Ohio was seen by many as a ridicule to the city, and residents felt that some characters and situations in the novel reflected their personal lives. Hurd is noted for helping to change their perspective of Anderson and his work in the town through his research.

== Memorials ==
On July 21, 2015, Cherry Street Park in Clyde was officially renamed to Thaddeus Hurd Park when resolution 2015-34 was passed by Clyde City Council. Scott Black, the Mayor of Clyde, said that "it might take a while for older residents to adapt to the name change, but it will eventually catch on."

On December 21, 2021, Clyde City Council officially rescinded Resolution 2015–34 with the passage of Resolution 2021–62 by a unanimous vote 5–0, allowing the park to revert to its original Cherry Street Park name.
