= Green Springs, Ohio =

- Village
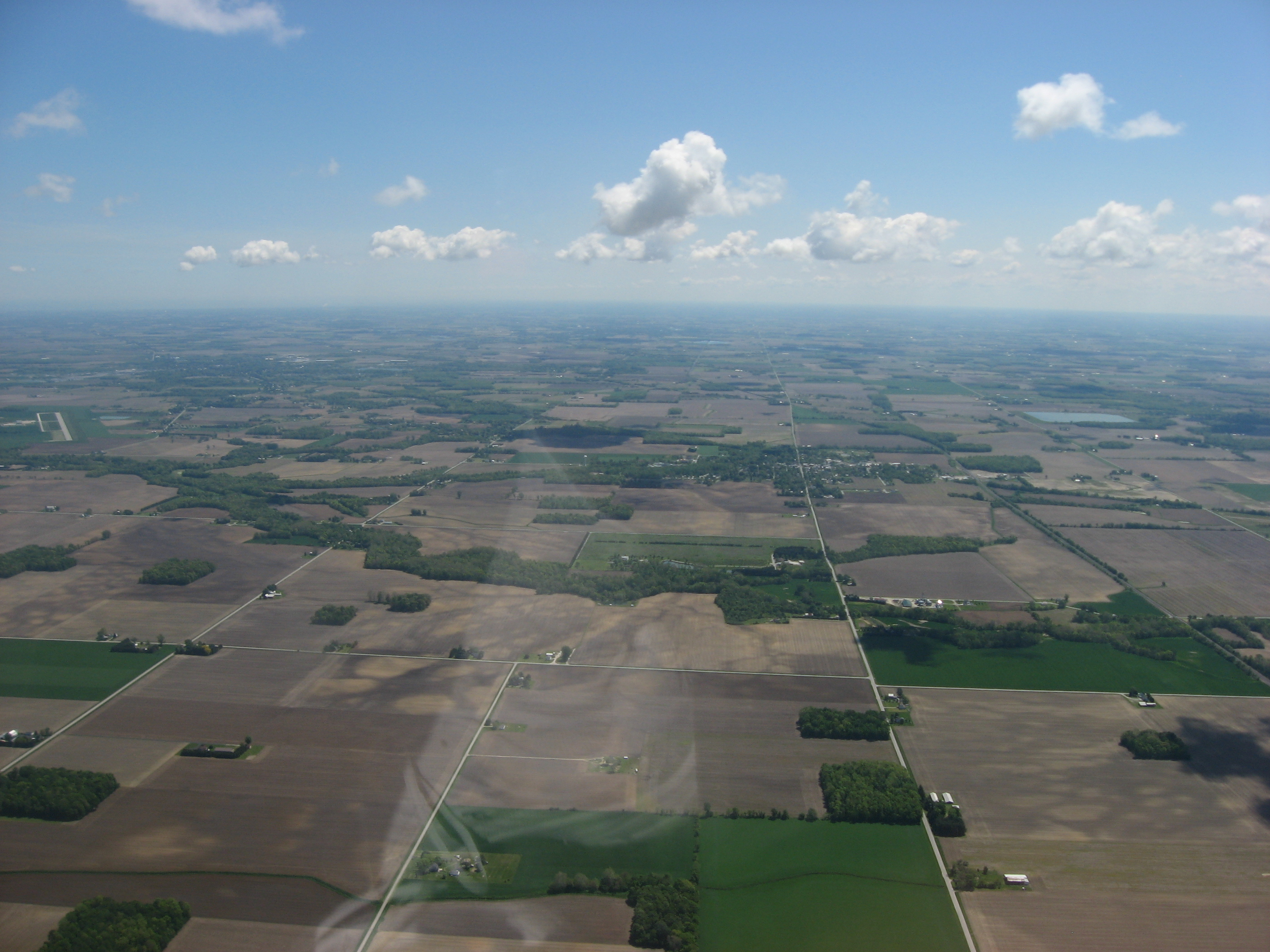
- Aerial view of Green Springs and the surrounding countryside

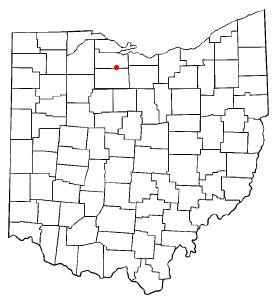
- Location of Green Springs, Ohio

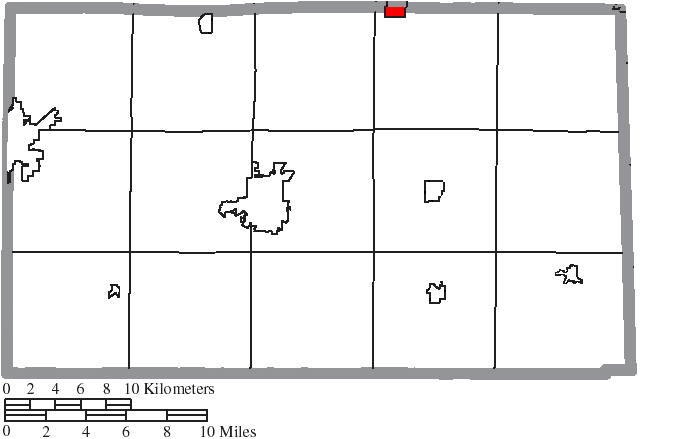
- Location of Green Springs in Seneca County
- Coordinates: 41°15′16″N 83°03′10″W
- Country: United States
- State: Ohio
- Counties: Sandusky, Seneca

Area
  - Total: 1.16 sq mi (3.01 km^{2})
  - Land: 1.16 sq mi (3.00 km^{2})
  - Water: 0.0039 sq mi (0.01 km^{2})
- Elevation: 702 ft (214 m)

Population (2020)
  - Total: 1,233
  - Estimate (2023): 1,222
  - Density: 1,062.7/sq mi (410.33/km^{2})
- Time zone: UTC-5 (Eastern (EST))
  - Summer (DST): UTC-4 (EDT)
- ZIP code: 44836
- Area code: 419
- FIPS code: 39-32256
- GNIS feature ID: 1086911
- Website: https://www.gsohio.org

Green Springs is a village in Sandusky and Seneca counties in the U.S. state of Ohio. The population was 1,233 at the 2020 census.

== History ==
The Green Springs area was originally inhabited by the Kaskaskia and Miami Nation.

On September 29, 1817, the Seneca whom had been displaced from their native lands in New York signed the Treaty of Fort Meigs, which established the 40,000 acre Seneca Indian Reservation and a $500 annuity. But on February 28, 1831, as part of the Treaty of Little Sandusky the Seneca agreed to relinquish their 40,000 acres in Ohio in exchange for 67,000 acres west of the Mississippi River and other provisions including a 5% annuity on the balance of the proceeds from the sale of the land in Ohio. This was part of the larger Indian Removal developed by the administration of Andrew Jackson.

In 1831, Jacob Stem, the founder of Green Springs, bought the land from the government. He purchased about 1,200 acres (4.9 km^{2}) within Sandusky and Seneca counties, including the sulfur spring. The village was originally called Stemtown, named after the founder. It was later called Green Springs, named from the color of the water from the spring.

== Geography ==
According to the United States Census Bureau, the village has a total area of 1.21 square miles (3.13 km^{2}), all land.

State Route 19 passes through the community, the in-town portion of which is called Broadway Street.

The Mad River and Lake Erie Railroad formerly passed through Green Springs, while the Nickel Plate Railroad (Currently the Fostoria District owned by Norfolk Southern) passes on the south edge of the town.

=== Pollution ===
North, just outside Green Springs, was the site of the dumping of toxic industrial waste by the Whirlpool Corporation. This dump site was later turned into a children's recreation area that some have tied to the Clyde cancer cluster. Since then, the park has been closed and Whirlpool has committed to cleaning up the site.

== Demographics ==
Historical population
Census	Pop.	Note	%±
1880	720		—
1890	910		26.4%
1900	816		−10.3%
1910	833		2.1%
1920	830		−0.4%
1930	750		−9.6%
1940	930		24.0%
1950	1,082		16.3%
1960	1,262		16.6%
1970	1,279		1.3%
1980	1,568		22.6%
1990	1,446		−7.8%
2000	1,247		−13.8%
2010	1,368		9.7%
2020	1,233		−9.9%
2023 (est.)	1,222	▼	−0.9%
U.S. Decennial Census

=== 2010 census ===
As of the census of 2010, there were 1,368 people, 481 households, and 320 families living in the village. The population density was 1,130.6 inhabitants per square mile (436.5/km^{2}). There were 520 housing units at an average density of 429.8 units per square mile (165.9 units/km^{2}). The racial makeup of the village was 96.4% White, 0.6% African American, 0.7% Native American, 0.1% Asian, 0.9% from other races, and 1.4% from two or more races. Hispanic or Latino of any race were 8.4% of the population.

There were 481 households, of which 36.2% had children under the age of 18 living with them, 47.8% were married couples living together, 11.2% had a female householder with no husband present, 7.5% had a male householder with no wife present, and 33.5% were non-families. 29.7% of all households were made up of individuals, and 13.1% had someone living alone who was 65 years of age or older. The average household size was 2.51 and the average family size was 3.03.

The median age in the village was 40.4 years. 24.9% of residents were under the age of 18; 6.4% were between the ages of 18 and 24; 25.1% were from 25 to 44; 25% were from 45 to 64; and 18.6% were 65 years of age or older. The gender makeup of the village was 48.3% male and 51.7% female.

=== 2000 census ===
As of the census of 2000, there were 1,247 people, 443 households, and 317 families living in the village. The population density was 1,163.1 inhabitants per square mile (449.1/km^{2}). There were 467 housing units at an average density of 435.6 units per square mile (168.2 units/km^{2}). The racial makeup of the village was 95.11% White, 0.32% African American, 0.32% Native American, 0.56% Asian, 2.17% from other races, and 1.52% from two or more races. Hispanic or Latino of any race were 5.13% of the population.

There were 443 households, out of which 35.7% had children under the age of 18 living with them, 55.3% were married couples living together, 10.4% had a female householder with no husband present, and 28.4% were non-families. 23.9% of all households were made up of individuals, and 11.3% had someone living alone who was 65 years of age or older. The average household size was 2.54 and the average family size was 2.97.

In the village, the population was spread out, with 24.3% under the age of 18, 9.1% from 18 to 24, 27.3% from 25 to 44, 20.0% from 45 to 64, and 19.2% who were 65 years of age or older. The median age was 38 years. For every 100 females there were 92.1 males. For every 100 females age 18 and over, there were 88.0 males.

The median income for a household in the village was $33,553, and the median income for a family was $43,462. Males had a median income of $32,100 versus $19,659 for females. The per capita income for the village was $17,734. About 5.4% of families and 8.7% of the population were below the poverty line, including 12.5% of those under age 18 and 11.5% of those age 65 or over.

== Education ==
Green Springs has one elementary school, Green Springs Elementary (grades K-5), which is part of Clyde-Green Springs Schools. They are known as the Clyde-Green Springs Fliers for their sports teams.

Green Springs has a public library, a branch of the Birchard Public Library Of Sandusky County.

== Notable people ==
- Ed Pulaski, Hero of the Big Burn and inventor of the Pulaski (tool) was born in Green Springs.
- Rodger Wilton Young, Medal of Honor recipient, moved to Green Springs when he was ten.
