= Clydesdale Motor Truck Company =

Former American motor company

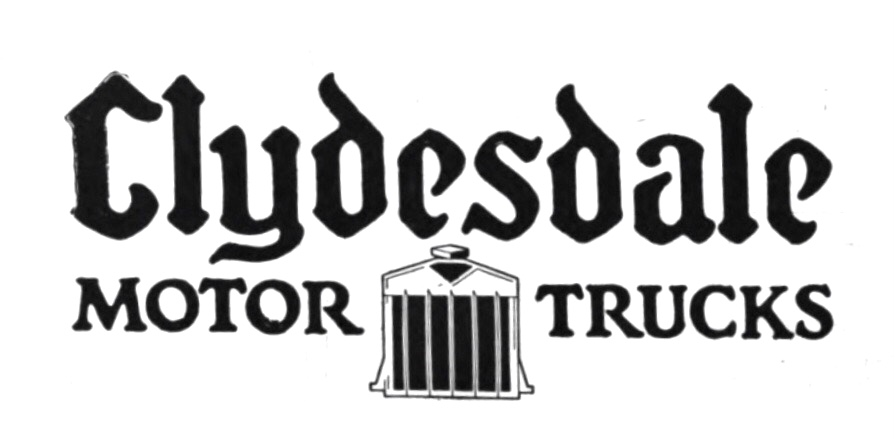
- Type: Truck Company
- Industry: Manufacturing
- Founded: 1917; 109 years ago <
- Defunct: 1939; 87 years ago
- Headquarters: Clyde, Ohio, US
- Products: Trucks

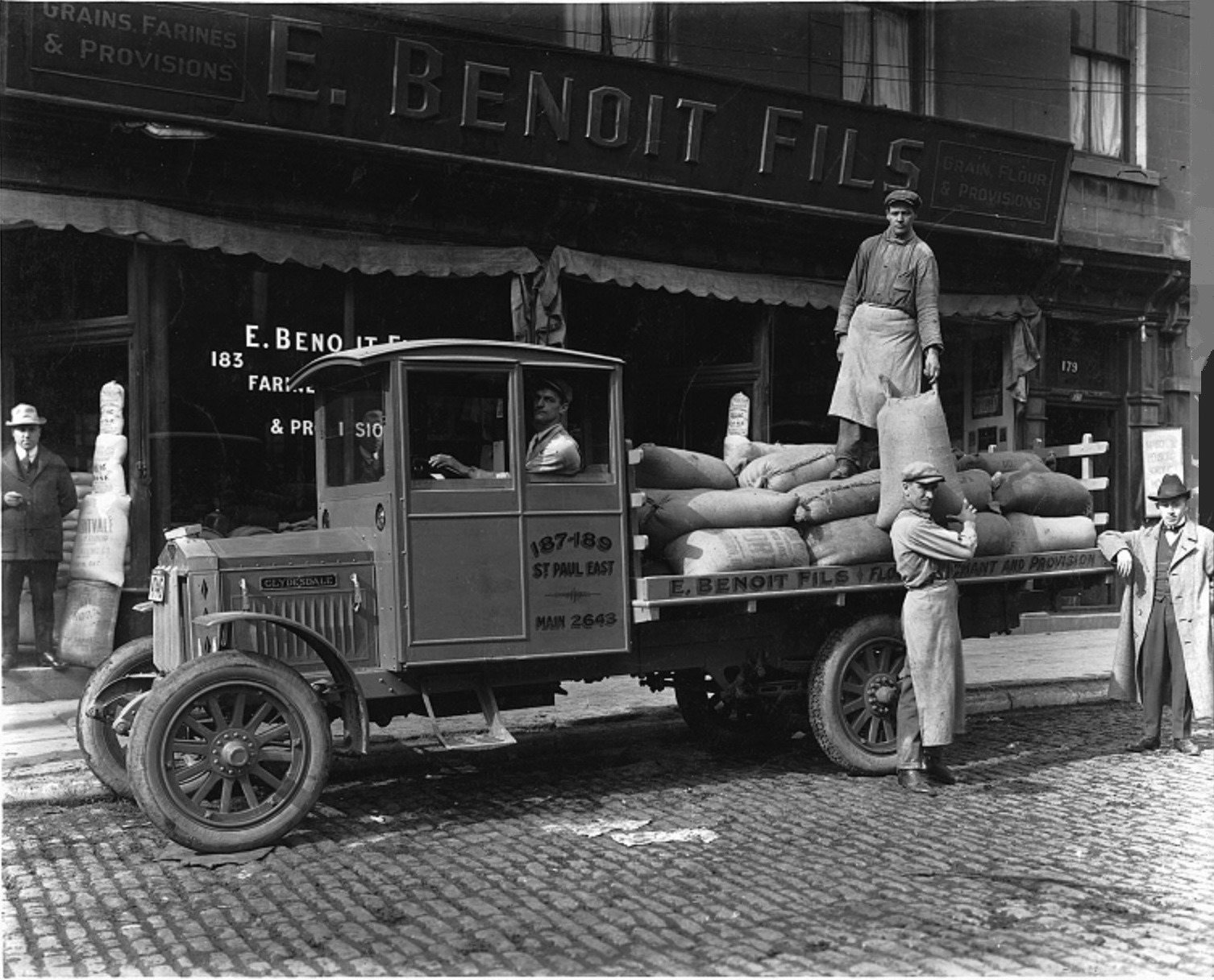
A Clydesdale truck in Montreal c. 1920

Clydesdale advertisement (1918)

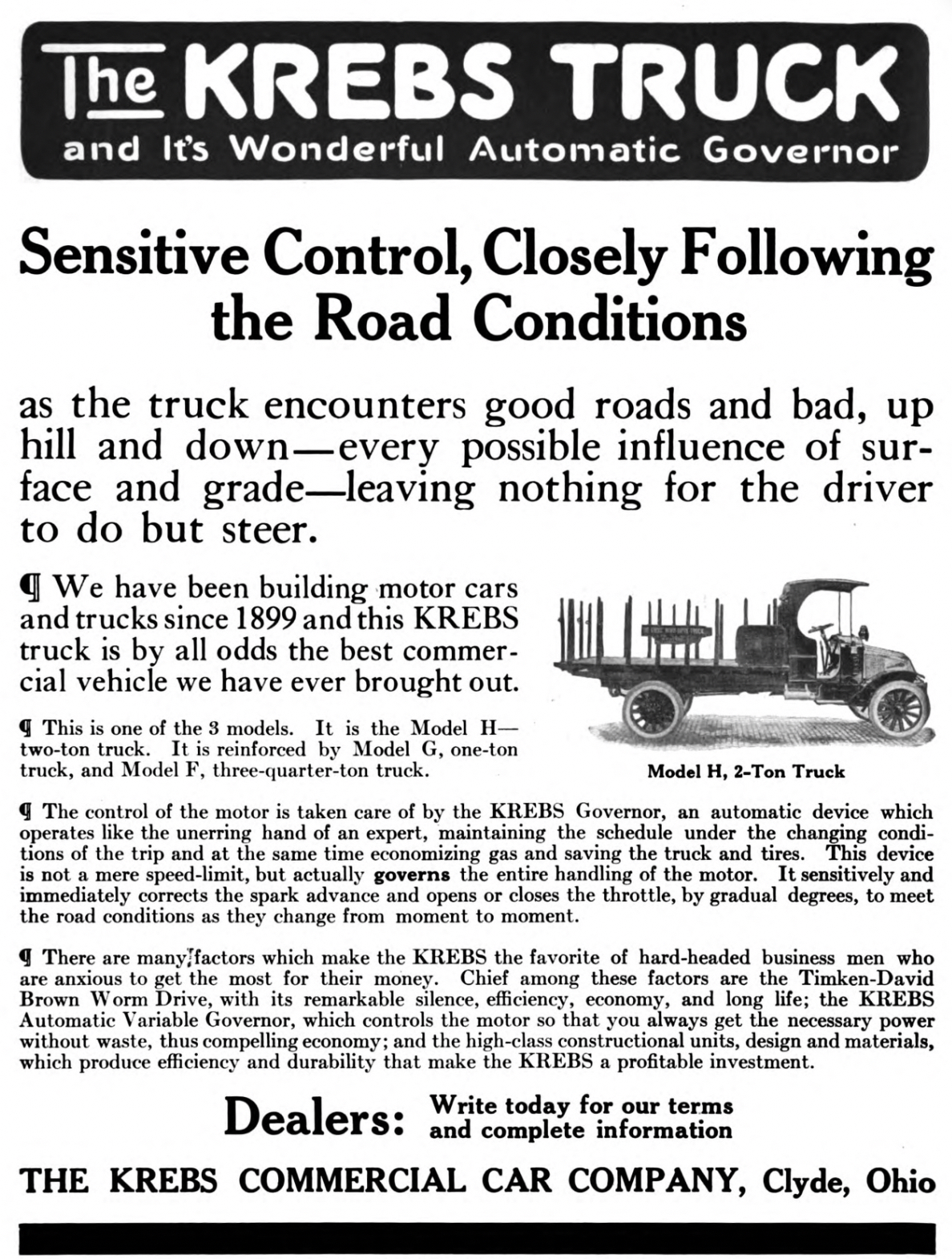
Krebs Commercial Car Company advertisement (1915)

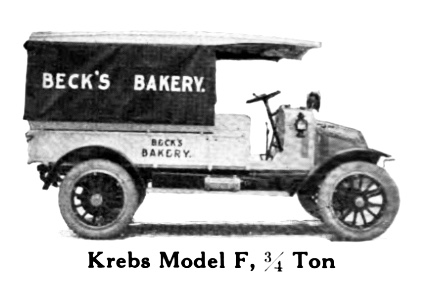
Krebs Model F (1912-1916)

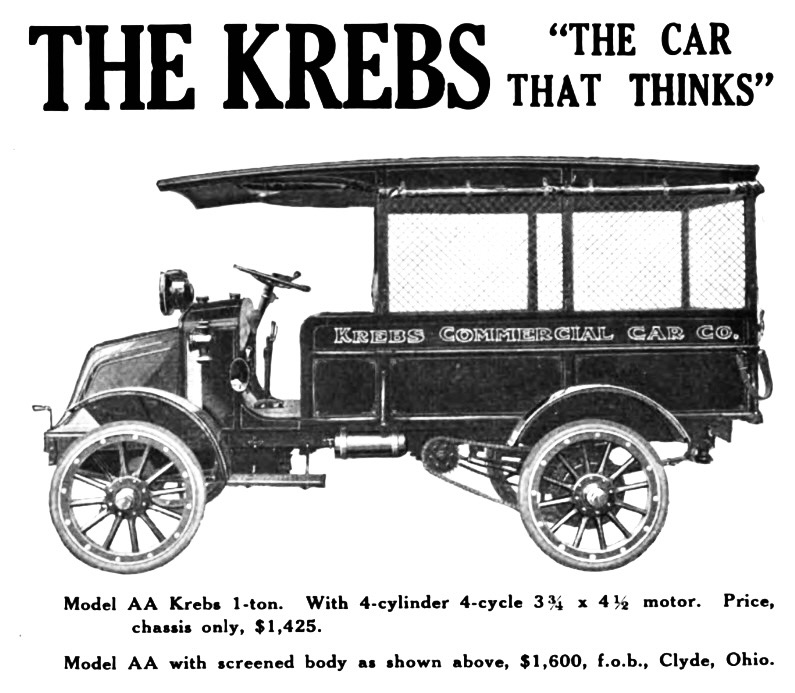
Krebs Model AA (1912-1916) 1 to

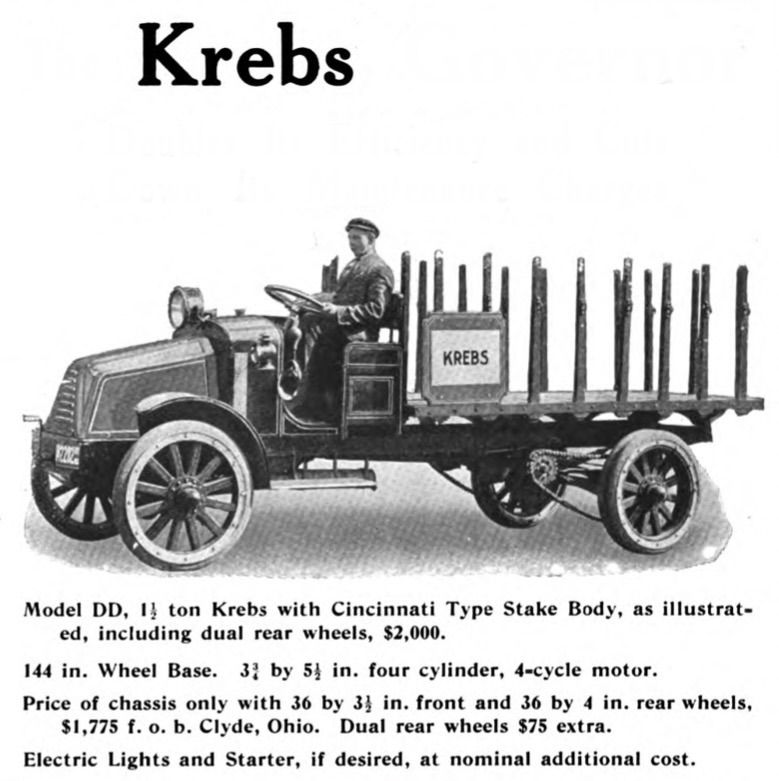
Krebs Model DD (1912-1916) 1,5 to

The Clydesdale Motor Truck Company was a motor company that existed from 1917 to 1939 with headquarters in Clyde, Ohio. Initially, they made military trucks for World War I. Military contracts continued to be a large part of their business after the war, but they also sold into many other markets: general haulage, farming, and specialized vehicles such as fire trucks. They survived the Wall Street crash of 1929 and the Great Depression, but increasingly struggling, they were wound up in 1939.

== Name ==
The name Clydesdale was chosen in part as a reference to the valley of the River Clyde in Scotland, archaically known as Clydesdale. Clyde, Ohio, the location of the company, is named after Clyde, New York, which in turn is named after the Scottish river. In part, the name was meant to invoke the Clydesdale horse, a strong draught horse used for haulage at the time, in an age when horse transport was still common. The breed of horse also originates in the same Scottish region.

== History ==
The company was formed in 1917 from the merger of three companies with Charles R. Dunbar as president. Two of these companies were based in Clyde, Ohio and had been established for some time. The larger company was the Clyde Cars Company, and the other was Krebs Commercial Car Company led by John C. Krebs, usually known as Louis, who became vice-president of the new company. The third company was the Lincoln Motor Truck Company based in Detroit. Lincoln was a new company formed in 1916 and made engines. Lincoln had only one model of truck. This had a four-cylinder overhead-valve engine and a three-speed gearbox. Much of Lincoln's operation was transferred to Clyde after the merger. The merged company was initially called the Clyde Cars Company and the Clydesdale name was used as a brand name for its trucks. In 1919, the company changed its name to the Clydesdale Truck Company.

=== Louis Krebs ===
Krebs first became involved with motor vehicles at the Elmore Manufacturing Company. Elmore was originally located in Elmore, Ohio but in 1893 moved to the Amanda Street site in Clyde that was later to become the Clydesdale Truck Co. Elmore was originally a bicycle manufacturer but they started manufacturing cars in 1900. They became known for their highly regarded two-stroke cars, the 1907 patent of which bears Krebs' name along with Frank Bachle. In 1909 Elmore was taken over by General Motors, and in 1912 moved Elmore operations to Detroit.

Krebs left Elmore when General Motors took over. In 1912 Krebs and Bachle purchased the vacated Amanda Street factory from General Motors and formed the Krebs Commercial Car Company. Krebs retooled the factory to make trucks rather than cars. A big selling point of Krebs' trucks was the provision of a governor, an early form of cruise control. The Amanda Street factory remained the center of operations after the merger forming the Clydesdale company.

=== World War I ===
The immediate production of the Clydesdale company on its formation in 1917 was for war production. The truck Clydesdale produced for military use was designed in partnership with the London General Omnibus Company. By this stage of the war the London company had gained extensive experience in making trucks suitable for the conditions of war. The US military on the other hand had very little experience; in 1911 the US Army owned a total of just twelve trucks, although they saw rather more significant use in the 1916 campaign against Pancho Villa. In comparison, British companies supplied 25,000 trucks for military use during the course of the war.

Clydesdale was not part of the order for 50,000 Liberty trucks placed by general John J. Pershing when the US entered the war. However, they were still successful in selling trucks to the US and other militaries, often for specialized purposes. The requirement for trucks far exceeded Pershing's initial order and Clydesdale struggled to keep up with demand. Trucks were shipped to Europe in kit form to reduce shipping tonnage. Clydesdale were particularly good at getting trucks into the smallest possible crate. It was claimed that Clydesdale trucks were shipped in smaller crates than Ford cars.

=== Post war ===
In 1919, Clydesdale opened an additional factory in Toronto, Canada. Krebs resigned from the company in 1922. In 1925 the company went into receivership and was sold to a new owner. The company survived the Great Depression which finished off half of US independent truck companies. Most of their business during this period was repairs and spares. However, in 1938 the US Navy cancelled a large order which led to the collapse of the company and it was wound up in 1939.

== Models ==
3.5-ton truck

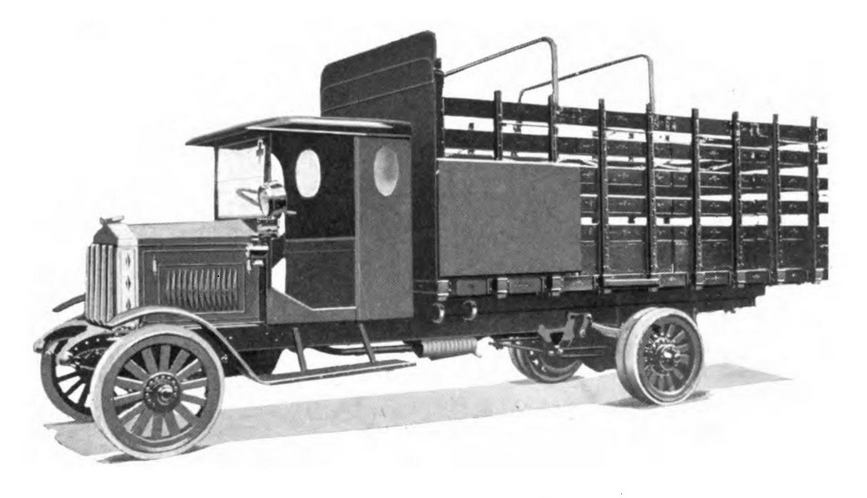
Model 90 Clydesdale three-and-one-half-ton truck, 1920 ·

5-ton truck

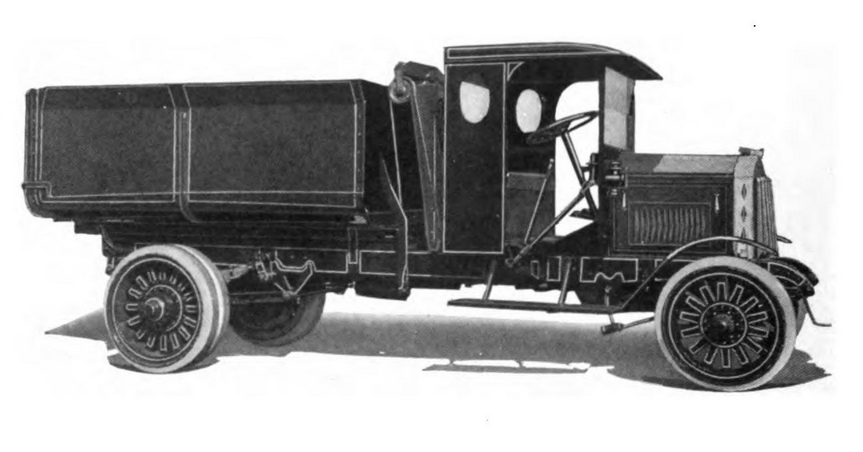
Model 120B Clydesdale five-ton truck, 1920

0.5-ton truck

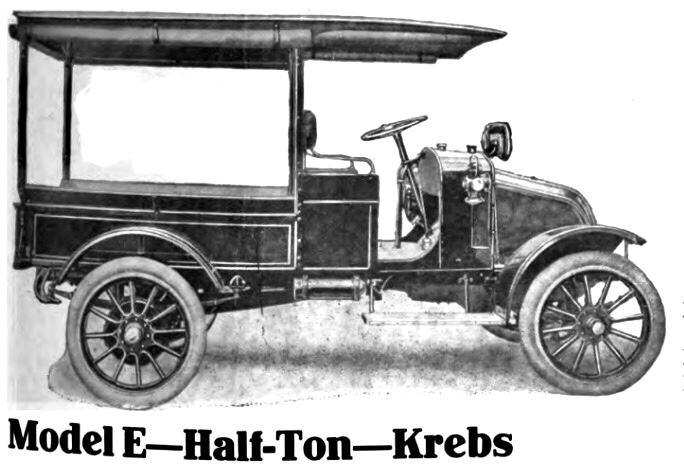
Krebs Model E (1914) 0.5 t

Early 1920s models included (horsepower according to SAE standard);

- Model 30, 1.25 ton, 19.6 hp
- Model 45, 1.5 ton, 27.2 hp
- Model 65, 2 ton, 27.2 hp
- Model 90, 3.5 ton, 32.4 hp
- Model 120, 5 ton, 36.1 hp

In 1922 Clydesdale introduced the Model 10 all-steel truck. In 1923 they moved into passenger vehicles with a 6-cylinder motor coach. In 1937 they began production of 4- and 6-cylinder diesel trucks (previous models had been gasoline). Around the same time they sold 15-ton 6×6 trucks to the US Army.

== Advertising ==
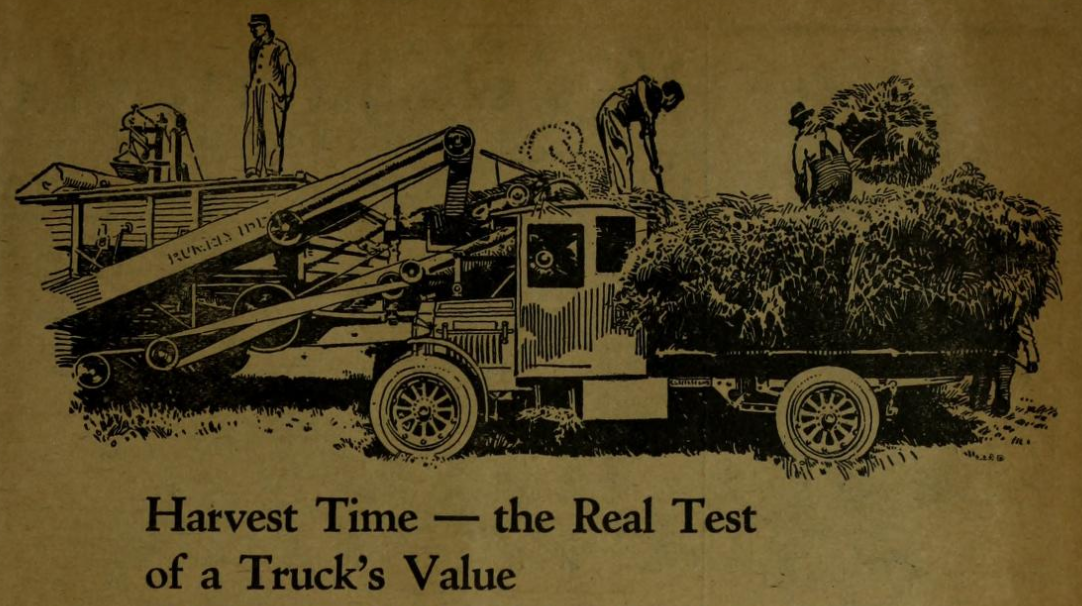
Clydesdale advertisement in Orchard and Farm, 1920

References to the Clydesdale horse were rarely used in Clydesdale's advertising, although some examples showing an image of such horses are known. After World War I, Clydesdale tried to use their association with the London General Omnibus Company for promotion, cashing in on that company's greater experience in building tough military vehicles. They advertised their trucks as "practically a duplicate" of LGO's wartime truck. They also emphasised ruggedness in their advertisements aimed at the farming market.

== Bibliography ==
- Bonsall, Thomas E., The Lincoln Motorcar: The Complete History of an American Classic, Stony Run Press, 1992 OCLC 28387523.
- Middleton, Tiffany Willey, Semon, James M, The Clydesdale Motor Truck Company: An Illustrated History, 1917-1939, McFarland, 2013 ISBN 0786475870.
- Mroz, Albert, American Cars, Trucks and Motorcycles of World War I, McFarland, 2009 ISBN 0786457252 .
- "Clydesdale Motor Truck Company", Hand Book of Automobiles, New York: National Automobile Chamber of Commerce, 1920 OCLC 7619212.
