= Climate change in Ohio =

Climate change in the US state of Ohio

Köppen climate types in Ohio now showing majority as humid subtropical.

Climate change in Ohio is of concern due to its impacts on the environment, people, and economy of Ohio. The annual mean temperature in Ohio has increased by about 1.2 °F (0.67 °C) since 1895. According to the United States Environmental Protection Agency, "All regions of Ohio have warmed."

== Effects of climate change in Ohio ==
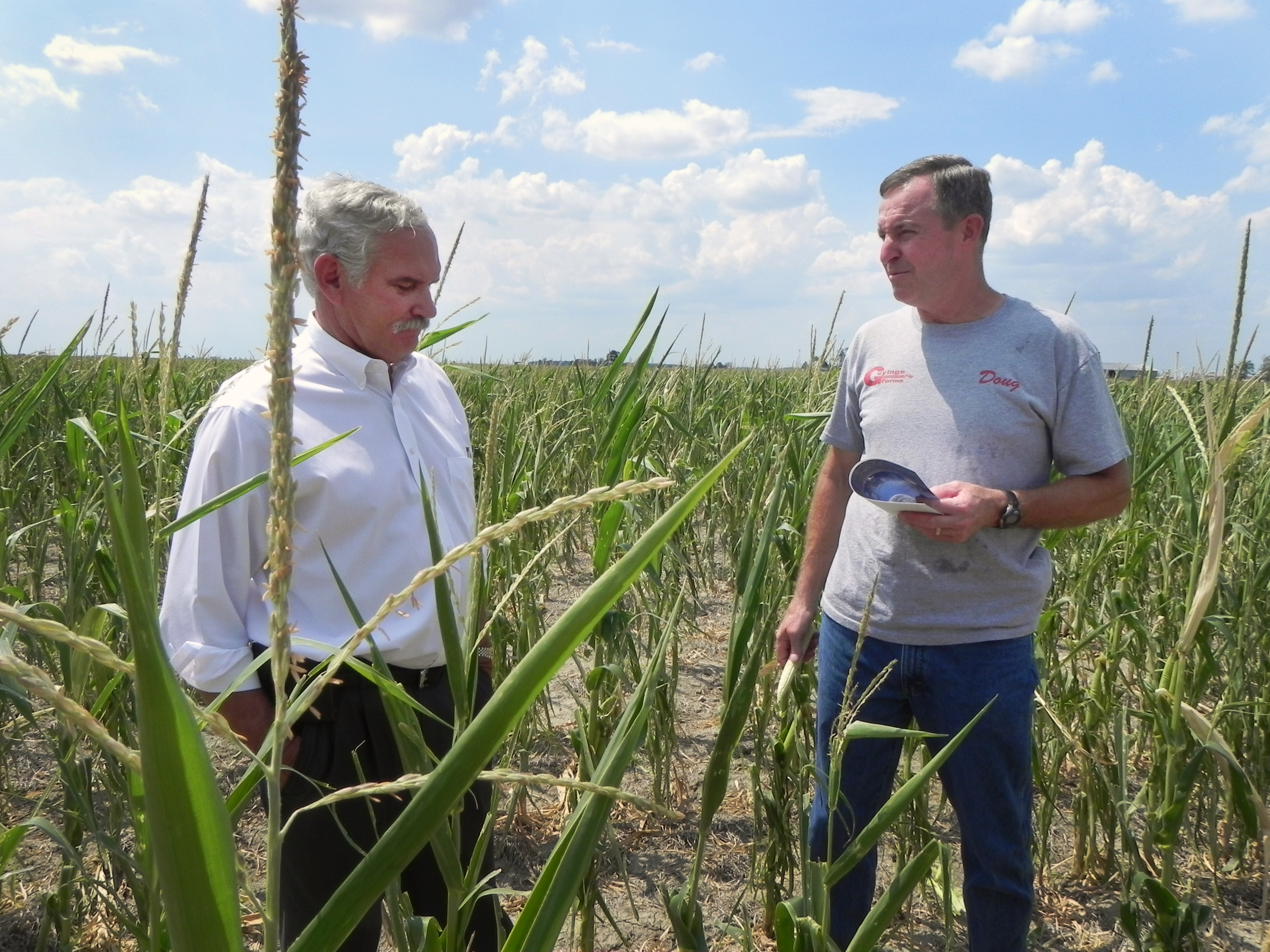
Drought conditions, Paulding County, 2012

=== Temperature ===
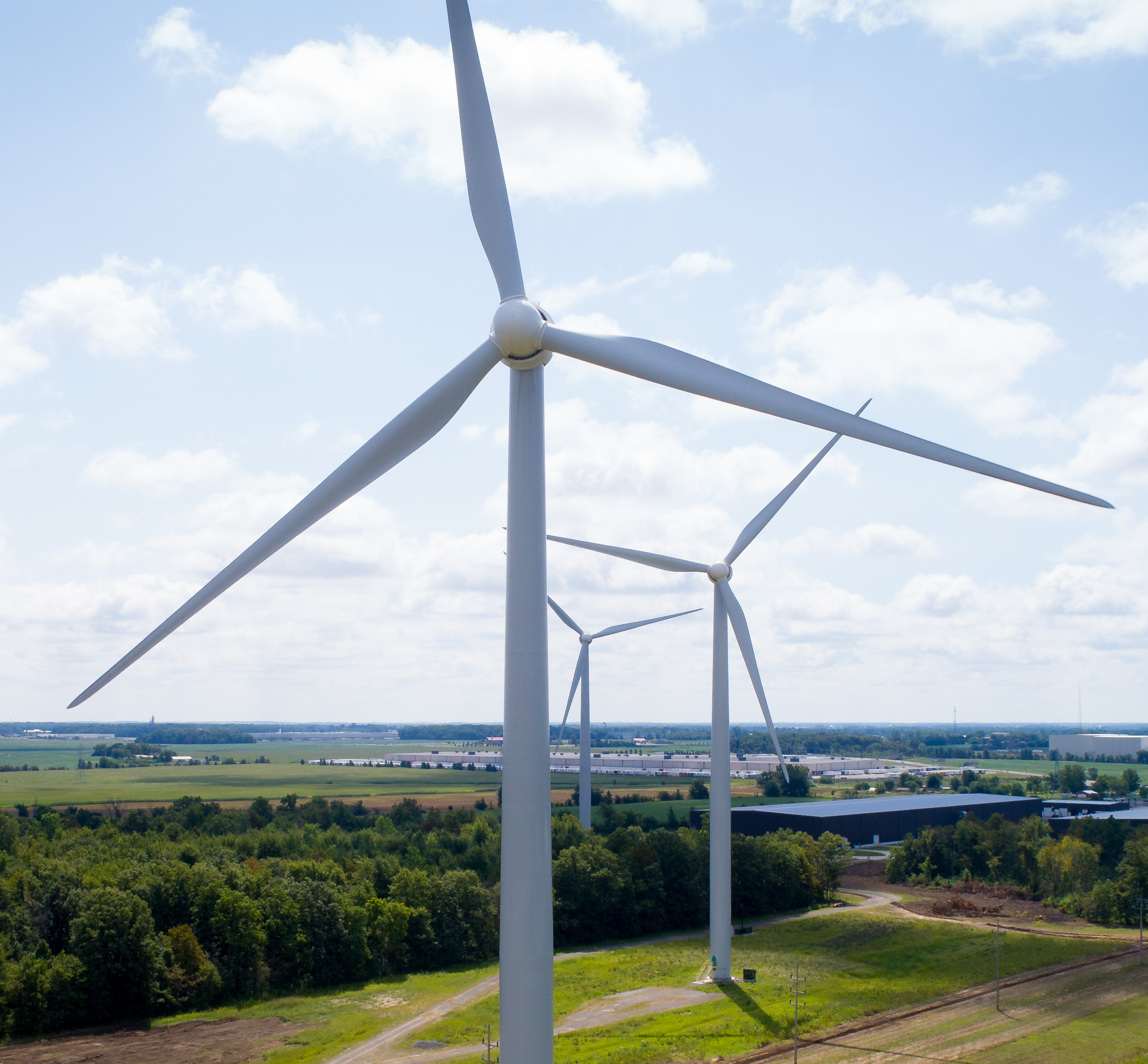
Wind turbines, Findlay

Higher average annual temperatures will increase the incidence of heatwaves. "Northern cities like Cleveland are vulnerable to heat waves, because many houses and apartments lack air conditioning, and urban areas are typically warmer than their rural surroundings." If current emissions trends continue, "Cincinnati would face at least two heat waves per summer like the one that killed hundreds in Chicago in 1995. Cleveland would face at least one."

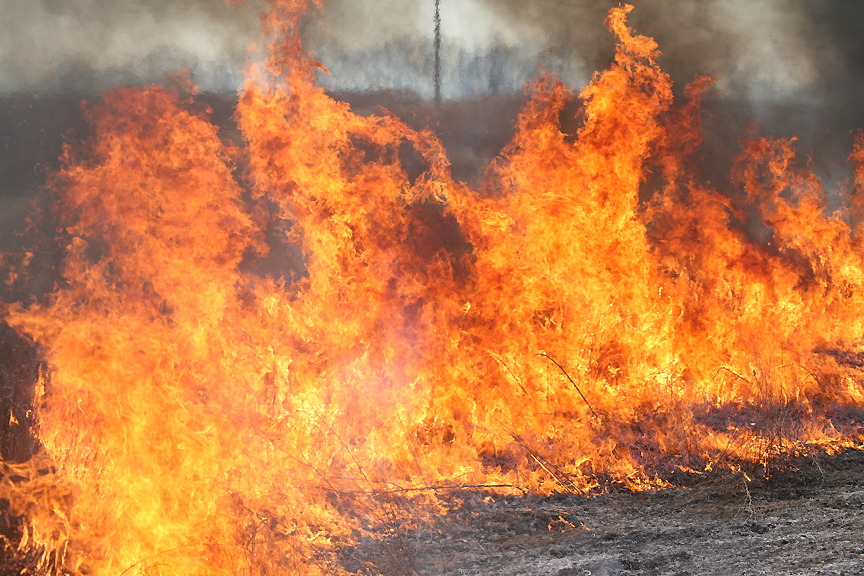
Fire, Wayne National Forest, 2009

A publication by the Climate System Research Center of the University of Massachusetts Amherst projects that, under the higher emissions scenario where global average temperature increases by 4.0–6.1 °C (7.2–11.0 °F), Cincinnati would experience over 80 days a year with temperatures over 90 °F (32 °C), and 29 days a year over 100 °F (38 °C).

=== Precipitation ===
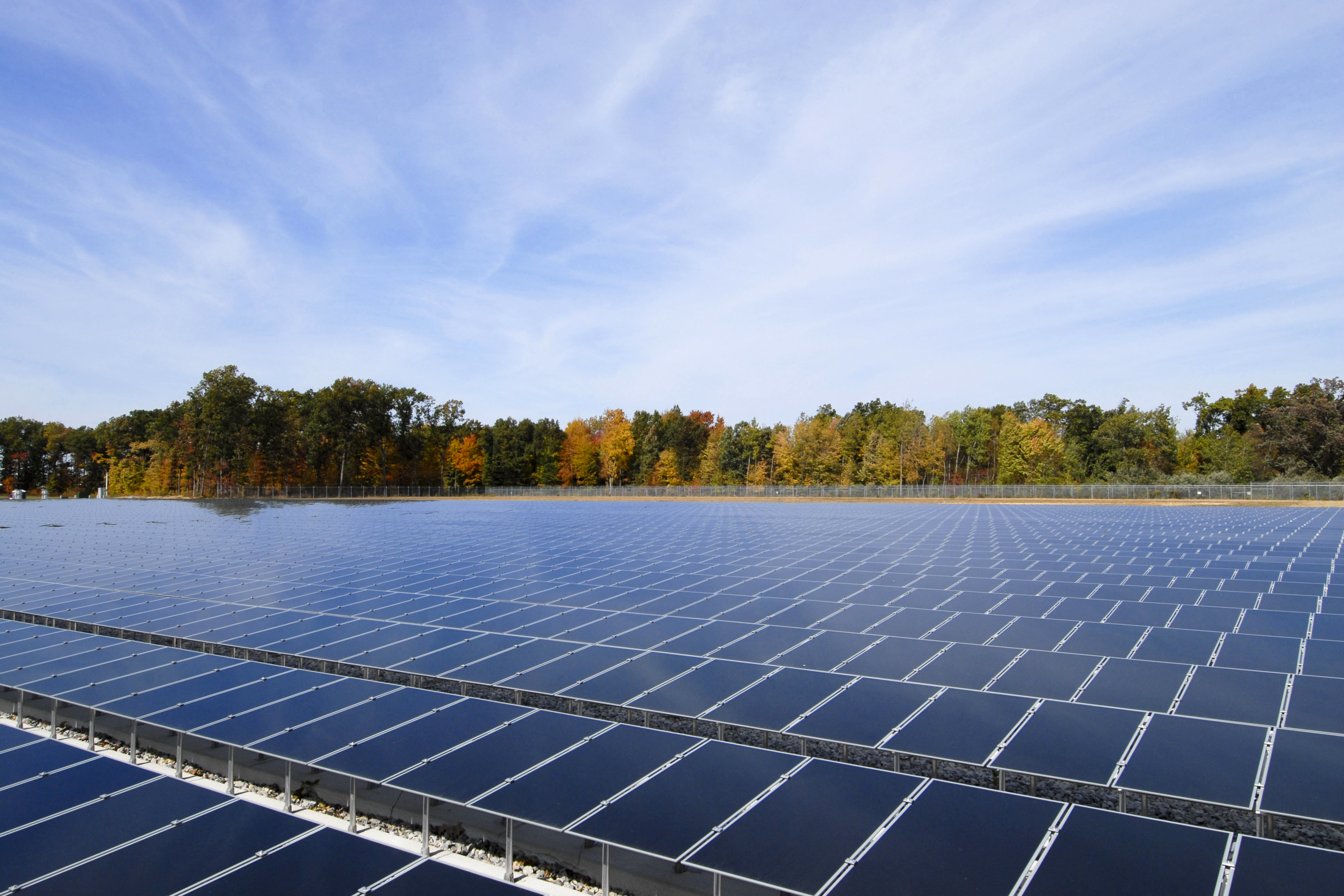
Solar panels, Toledo Air National Guard Base, Swanton

Ohio, along with the rest of the Midwest, experienced a 37% increase in the amount of precipitation falling in multi-day precipitation events from 1958 to 2012. Ohio is expected to experience greater amounts of precipitation, but less snowfall in the winter due to the higher temperatures. Accordingly, the risk of flooding in Ohio is due to increase. Greater heavy rainfall in the Midwest are leading to soil erosion and nutrient loss.

=== Agriculture ===
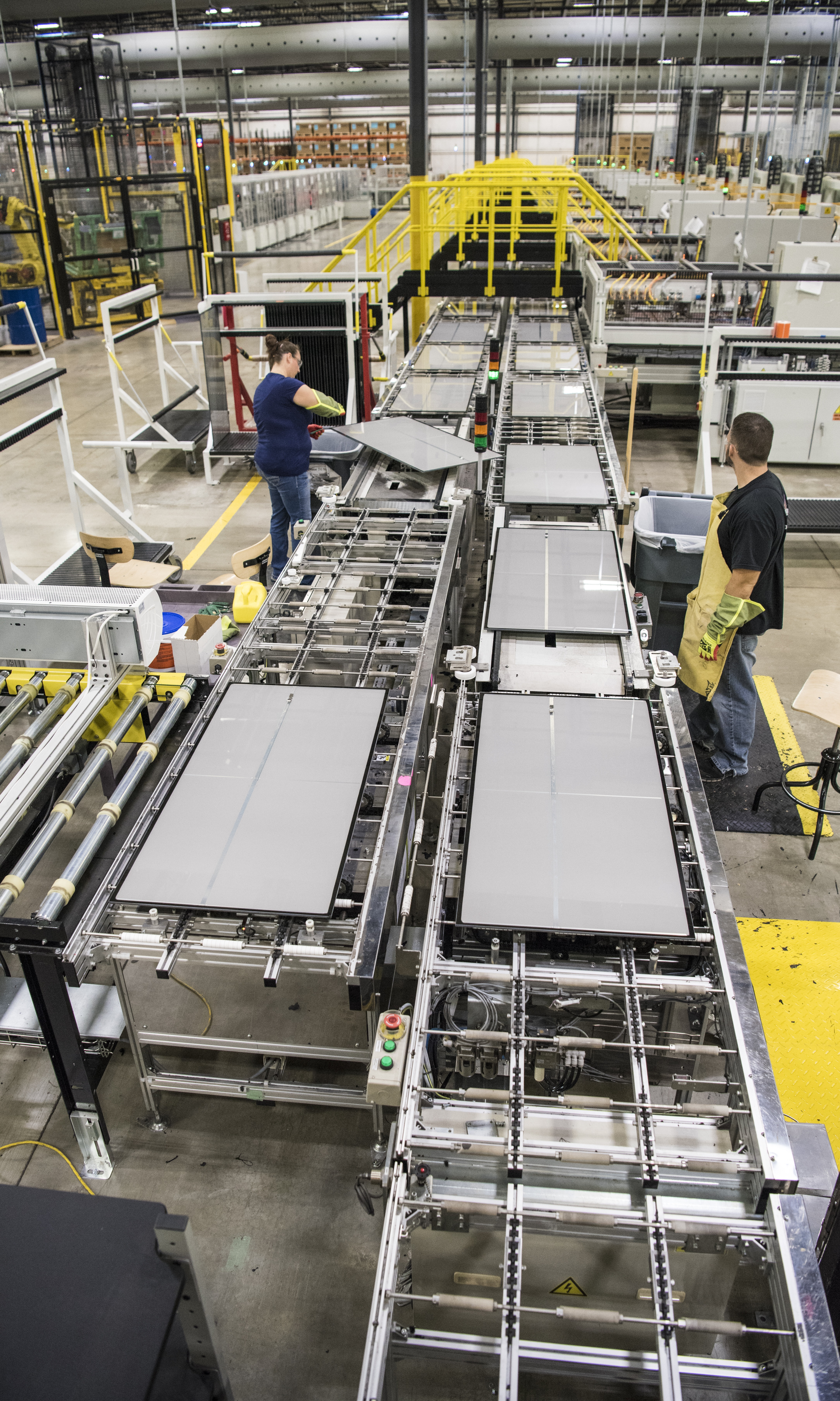
Solar panel manufacturing, Perrysburg, 2017

Severe droughts would hurt crop yields. "In rural Ohio, ozone levels are high enough to significantly reduce yields of soybeans and winter wheat."

Climate change may have some benefits in certain respects, however. "Longer frost-free growing seasons and higher concentrations of atmospheric carbon dioxide would increase yields for some crops during an average year."

=== Ecosystems ===
Changing temperatures will affect which plant species survive in Ohio. "Species that prefer cool soils like Eastern hemlock will find fewer and fewer suitable locations to survive."

=== The Great Lakes ===
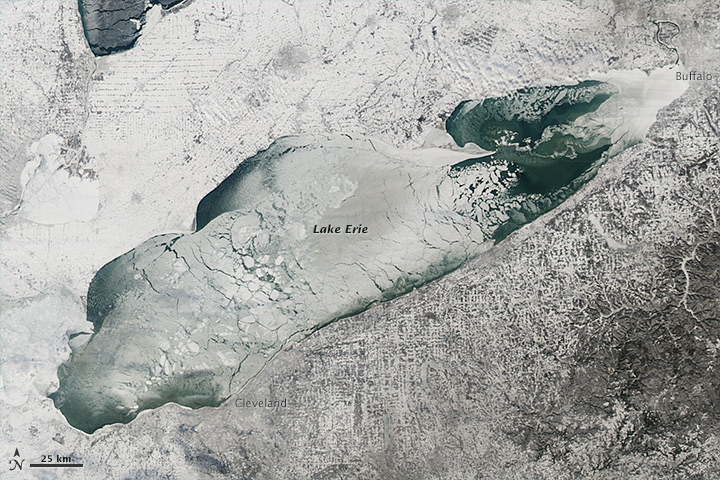
Lake Erie in January 2014. Ice cover "on the Great Lakes is forming later or melting sooner."

"Between 1994 and 2011, reduced ice cover lengthened the shipping season on the lakes by eight days. The Great Lakes are likely to warm another 3° to 7°F in the next 70 years, which will further extend the shipping season."

Higher water temperature leads to greater algae blooms. Worsening storms also increase run-off into the Great Lakes, and overflow of sewers into the Great Lakes, worsening water quality.

=== Disease ===
Areas in Ohio are potentially vulnerable to "formerly tropical illnesses" like Zika and West Nile, which have been making their way into the state. Tick-borne disease are an increasing concern in Ohio, with both Lyme disease and Rocky Mountain spotted fever (RMSF) common in the state.

== Adaptation to climate change in Ohio ==
Ohio has not adopted or developed a statewide adaptation plan, though local governments like Cleveland and Columbus have.

=== Proposed adaptations ===
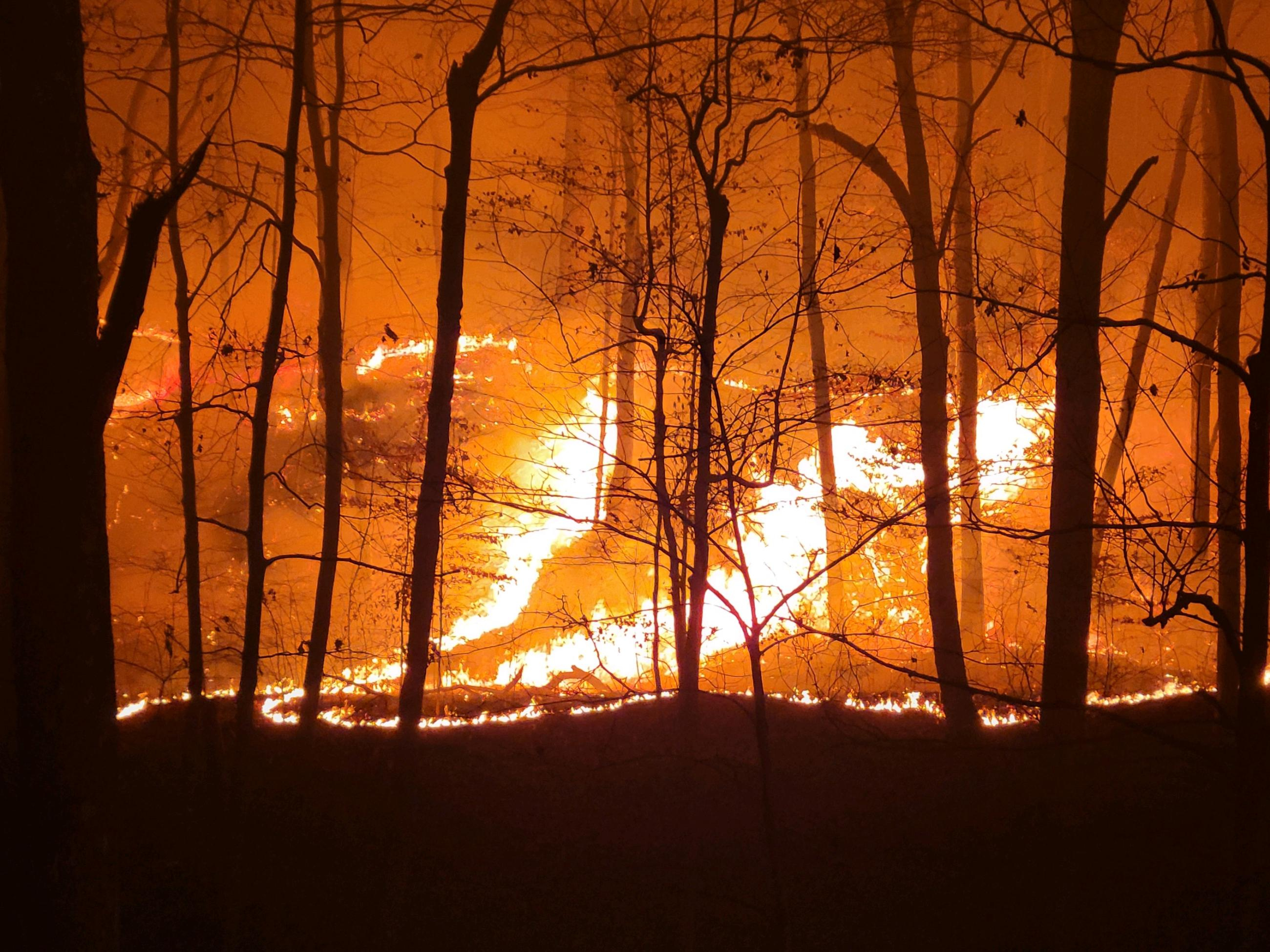
Kimble Complex Fire, 2022

Due to things like stronger storms, worsening droughts, and higher incidence of "mold toxins, like aflatoxin in corn, soy, and small grain crops," farmers in Ohio "will need to adapt by developing new cropping schedules and different crop choices." Changes in fertilizer management are needed to address elevated phosphorus in agricultural runoff in the Maumee River watershed, which contributes to toxic algae blooms of cyanobacteria in Lake Erie.

While spring rainfall and average precipitation are going to increase, droughts in summer are likely to worsen. Drier times would require irrigation to make up for moisture loss, driving up food costs.

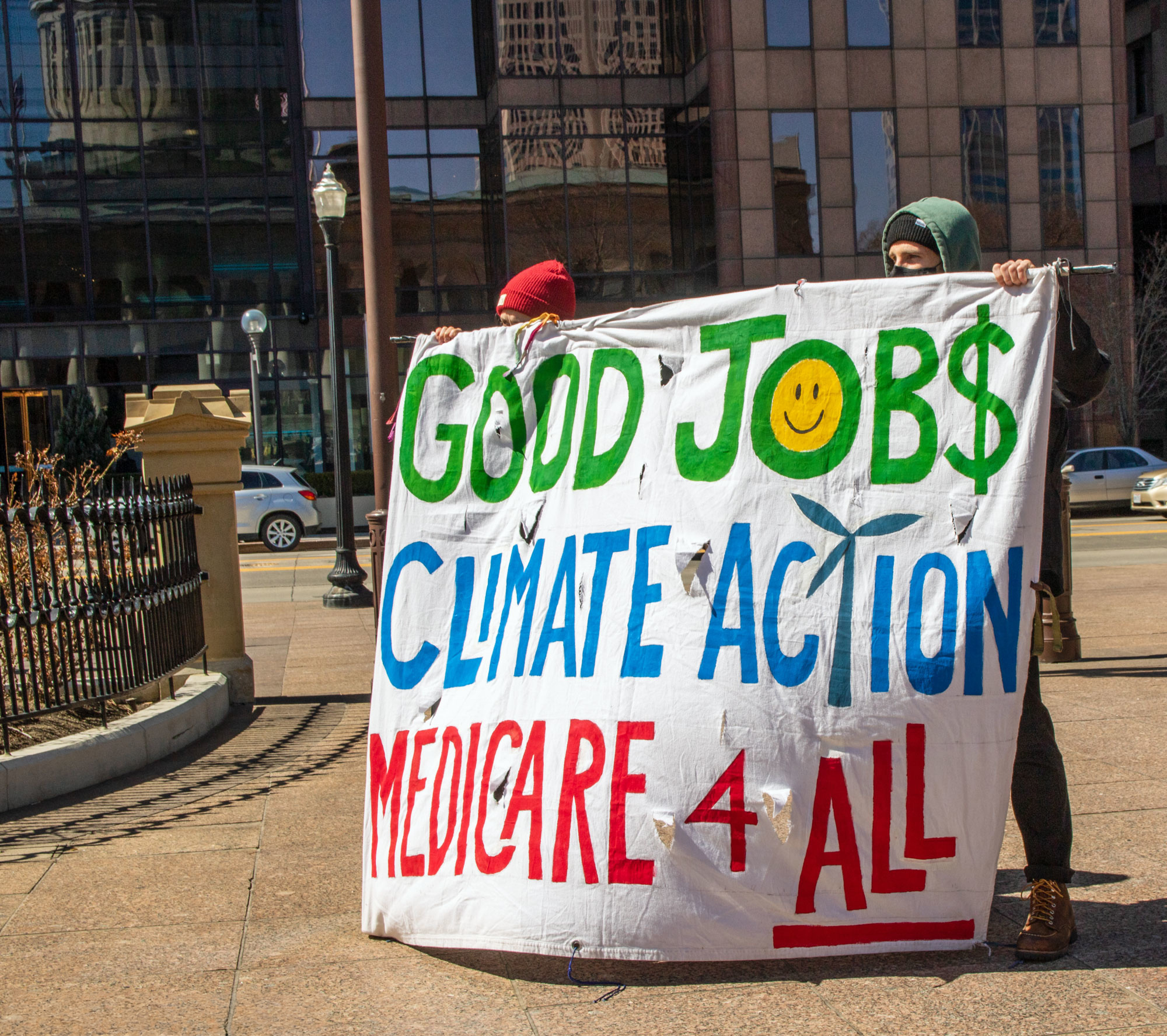
Climate march, 2021

The Byrd Polar and Climate Research Center of Ohio State University published a report, the "Columbus Climate Adaptation Plan," which includes a list of proposed actions to adapt and respond to climate change in Central Ohio.

Ohio State University held its first Climate Change Symposium in March 2019.

== Greenhouse gas emissions in Ohio ==
"Ohio is the fourth largest producer of global warming emissions among all the states," with per capita emissions nearly "19 percent higher than the national average." This is "mainly because 87 percent of Ohio's electricity comes from coal-fired power plants (compared with the national average of 50 percent)." Electricity generation accounts for 49% of greenhouse gas emissions in Ohio, followed by 26% from transportation and 14% from industry.

== See also ==
- Environmental issues in the United States
- Plug-in electric vehicles in Ohio
