= Clyde High School =

Clyde High School may refer to:

- Clyde High School (Ohio), Clyde, Ohio
- Clyde High School (Texas), Clyde, Texas
