= Elmore Manufacturing Company =

Defunct American motor vehicle manufacturer

Coordinates: 41.3080592°N 82.9801792°W

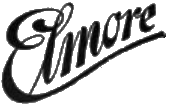
- Type: Division
- Industry: Automotive
- Founded: 1893; 133 years ago
- Founder: Harmon Von Vechten Becker and his two sons, James & Burton
- Defunct: 1912; 114 years ago
- Fate: Purchased by General Motors in 1908, became a division
- Headquarters: Clyde, Ohio, United States
- Area served: United States
- Products: Automobiles, parts
- Parent: General Motors

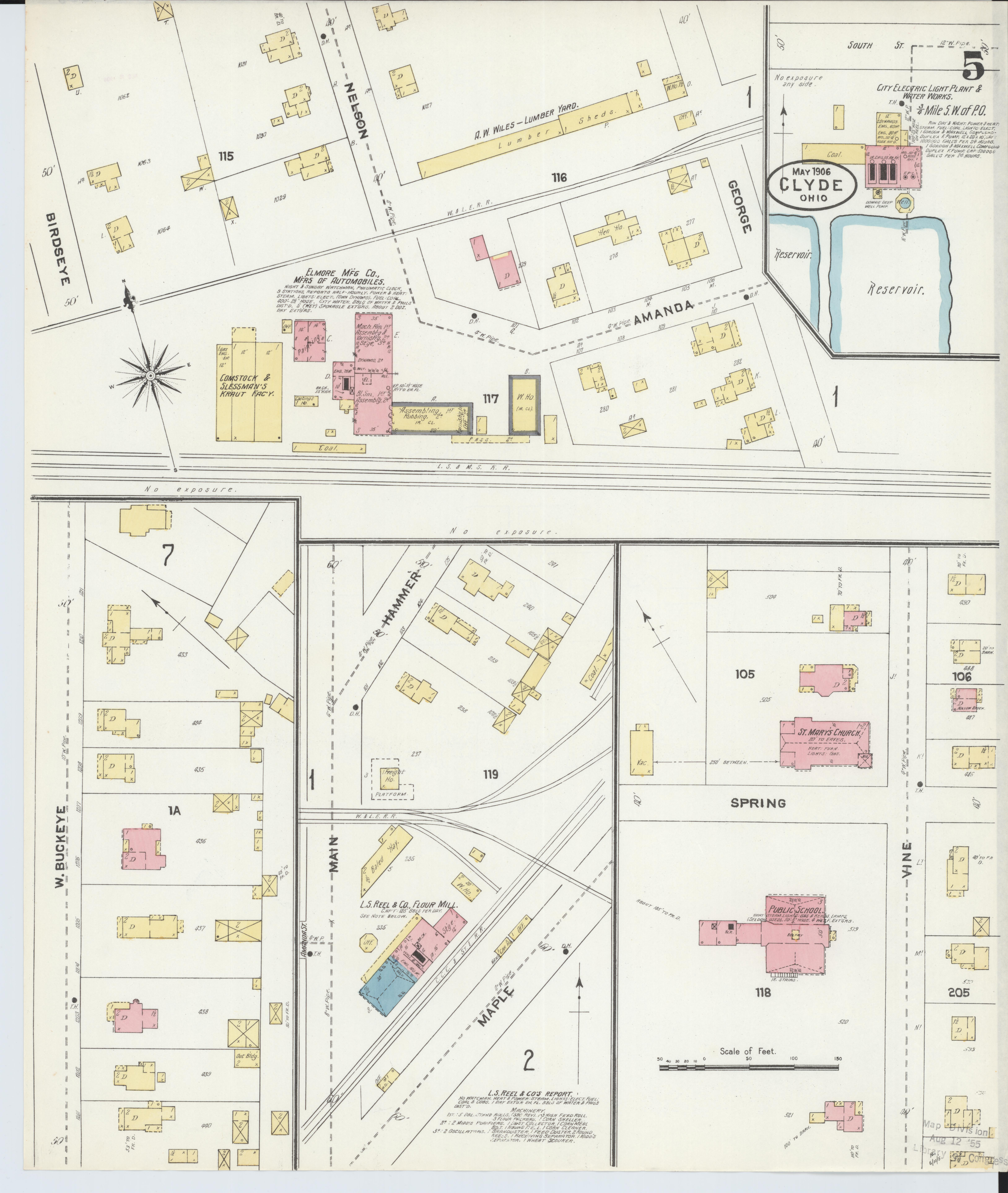
Elmore Plant (1906)

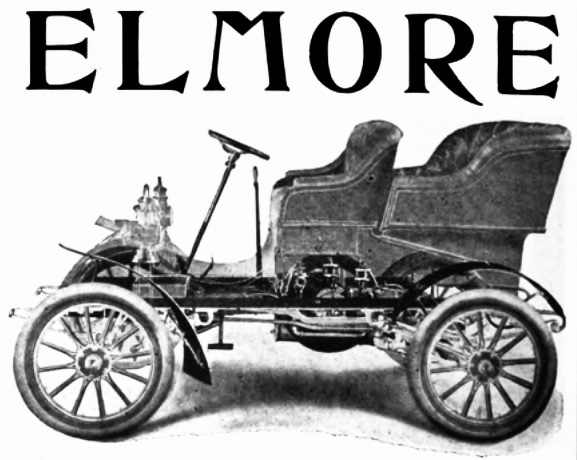
Elmore Model 9 (1904)

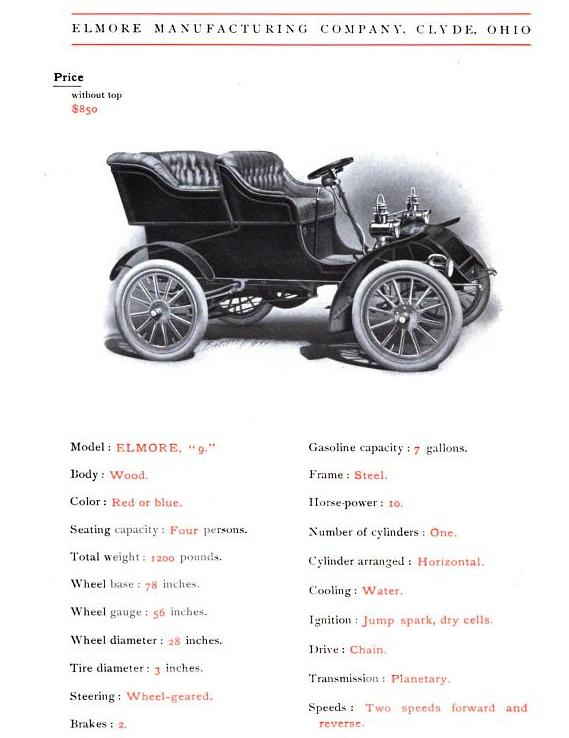
1905 Elmore Model 9

Elmore Manufacturing Company was a manufacturer of veteran and brass era automobiles and bicycles (1893–97), headquartered at 504 Amanda Street, Clyde, Ohio, from 1893 until 1912. The company took its name from a small parcel of land in Clyde with the name Elmore associated with it where a stave mill was established originally, then evolved into bicycle production. The village of Elmore, Ohio is located 20 mi (32.2 km) to the east. Founded by Harmon Von Vechten Becker and his two sons, James and Burton, the Elmore used a two-stroke engine design, in straight twin or single-cylinder versions. They later produced a straight-3 followed by a straight-4 beginning in 1906 until production ended in 1912. The company advertising slogan was "The Car That Has No Valves", referring to the two-stroke engine.

== History ==
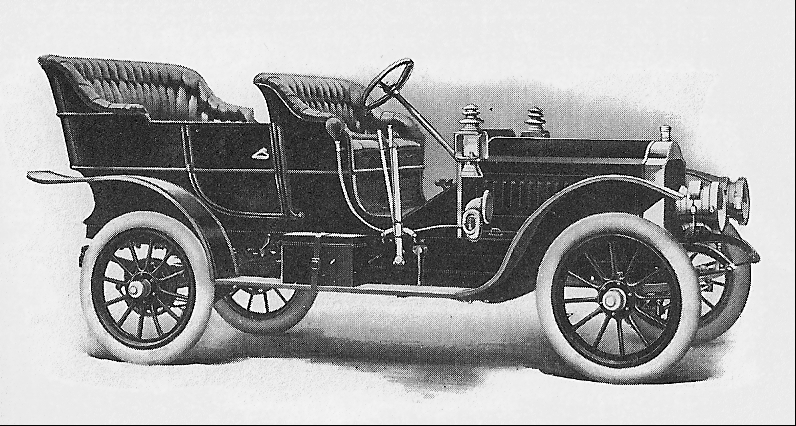
1908 Elmore Model 40

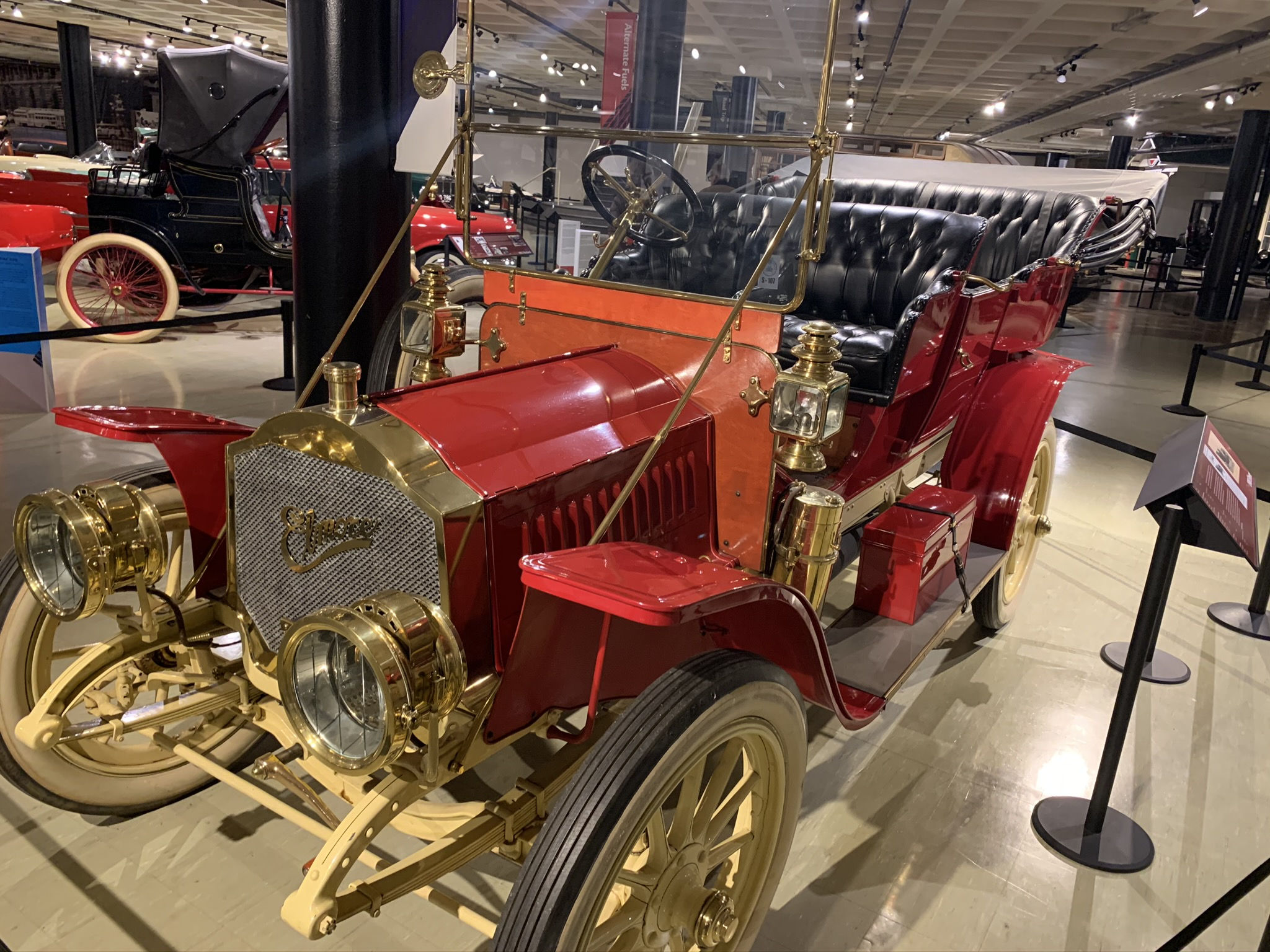
1908 Elmore at Crawford museum in Cleveland

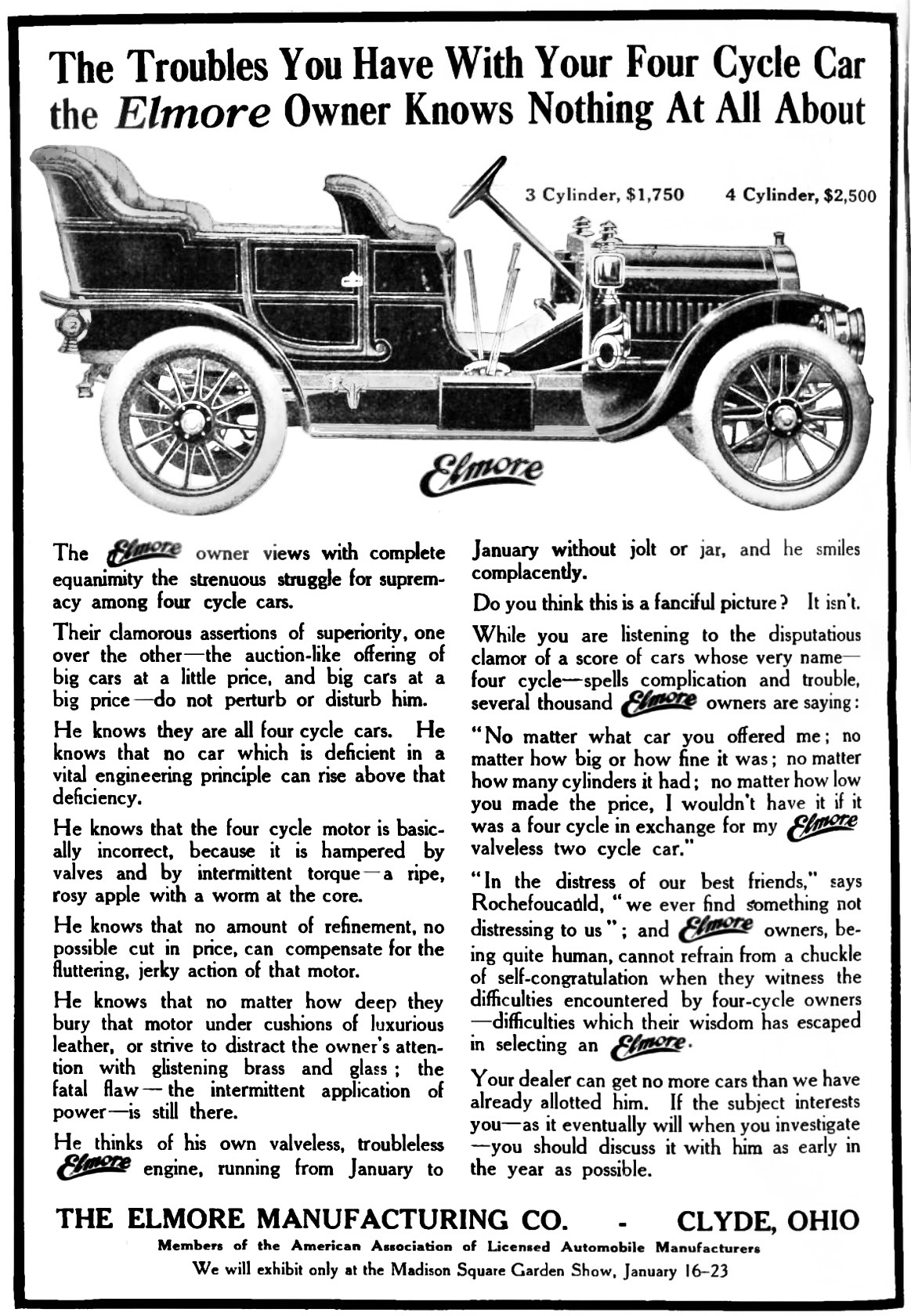
Elmore Model 33 and Model 44 advertisement (1909)

The first car was offered in 1900 with two body styles seating either two or four passengers with a single cylinder engine producing 6 hp with a 62" wheelbase. The roadster was listed for US$750 ($29,025 in 2025 dollars) By 1904 the Model 9 was the Elmore Convertible Runabout. Equipped with a tonneau, it could seat four passengers and sold for just US$850 ($30,458 in 2025 dollars), making it one of the least-expensive vehicles on the market. The flat-mounted single-cylinder engine, situated at the center of the car, produced 6.5 hp (4.8 kW). A 2-speed transmission was fitted. The car weighed 1050 lb (476 kg).

The Elmore Runabout was next in line. It could seat two passengers and sold for US$800 ($28,667 in 2025 dollars). The vertically mounted Straight-twin engine, also situated at the center of the car, produced 8 hp (6 kW). A 3-speed transmission was fitted. The angle iron-framed car weighed 1400 lb (635 kg).

The top model was the Elmore Tonneau. It could seat four passengers and sold for US$1400 ($50,167 in 2025 dollars). The flat-mounted straight-twin was situated at the front of the car, produced 12 hp (8.9 kW). A 3-speed transmission was fitted. The angle iron-framed car weighed 1500 lb (680 kg). One 1908 Elmore is on display at the Crawford Museum in Cleveland Ohio.

=== General Motors ===
In 1908, Elmore's three-cylinder two-stroke caught the attention of William C. Durant, founder of General Motors. He purchased the company the following year for US$500,000 ($17,916,667 in 2025 dollars), with Elmore becoming one of General Motors' divisions. After Durant was forced out of General Motors in 1910, the Elmore marque was soon cut, along with several other underperforming brands, to help General Motors achieve financial stability. The factory location was then bought from GM and the Clydesdale Motor Truck Company was in operation from 1917 to 1939. The Clydesdale Factory was then the site of Clyde Porcelain Steel Company until the factory burned down November 11, 1945. The factory was rebuilt and the Bendix Corporation operated a factory at this location which made front load washing machines under the Bendix Home Appliances until the business was sold to Avco Manufacturing Corporation in 1951, and combining Bendix Appliances with Crosley Appliances. In 1956, Avco sold Bendix Home Appliances to Philco. The current location is now Whirlpool Corporation where Maytag, Whirlpool, and Amana washing machines are manufactured and is the largest factory in America that manufactures washing machines.

== Models ==
For specifications on various Elmore Manufacturing Company models:

- Elmore Model 9
- Elmore Model 10
- Elmore Model 11
- Elmore Model 14
- Elmore Model 15
- Elmore Model 16
- Elmore Model 18
- Elmore Model 40
- Elmore Model 30
- Elmore Model 33
- Elmore Model 36
- Elmore Model 44
- Elmore Model Landaulet
- Elmore Model Roadster
- Elmore Model Taxicab
- Elmore Model 46

== See also ==
- Brass Era car
- List of defunct United States automobile manufacturers

== Bibliography ==
- Frank Leslie's Popular Monthly (January, 1904)
- Clymer, Floyd. Treasury of Early American Automobiles, 1877-1925. New York: Bonanza Books, 1950.
