= Ohio Environmental Protection Agency =

Environmental Protection Agency
Department overview
- Formed: October 23, 1972
- Jurisdiction: Ohio
- Department executive: John Logue, Director
- Website: www.epa.ohio.gov

The Ohio Environmental Protection Agency (Ohio EPA) is the administrative department of the Ohio state government responsible for protecting the environment and public health by ensuring compliance with environmental laws. Those laws and related rules outline Ohio EPA's authority and what things the Agency can consider when making decisions about regulated activities.

Ohio EPA was created on Oct. 23, 1972. It combined environmental programs that previously had been scattered throughout several state departments. The director of Ohio EPA is appointed by the governor and serves as a cabinet member.

Ohio EPA establishes and enforces standards for air, water, waste management and cleanup of sites contaminated with hazardous substances. The Agency also provides financial assistance to businesses and communities; environmental education programs for businesses and the public; and pollution prevention assistance to help businesses minimize their waste at the source.

== Organization ==
Ohio EPA has several regulatory divisions that play different roles in environmental protection. Each division issues permits to regulate industries that pollute in a specific area, like air emissions or wastewater discharges to rivers and streams. The permits include requirements for operating, monitoring and reporting compliance. There are a few core responsibilities that each regulatory division of Ohio EPA fulfills:

- Review permit applications and issue permits to facilities.
- Investigate citizen complaints.
- Monitor to make sure all environmental standards are met (usually accomplished by collecting samples of air, water or soil and testing them for pollutants in a laboratory; and reviewing sampling and monitoring data submitted by a facility).
- Provide technical assistance to help regulated facilities understand and follow environmental laws and permit requirements.
- Take enforcement action against facilities that violate environmental laws and permit requirements.
- Non-regulatory divisions provide financial assistance to businesses and communities; site cleanup and spill response; environmental education programs for businesses and the public; pollution prevention assistance to help businesses minimize their waste at the source; laboratory analysis; and criminal environmental investigations.

Ohio EPA’s Central Office is located in Columbus. Five district offices manage the Agency's programs at the local level. They are located in Bowling Green, Twinsburg, Dayton, Columbus and Logan.

== See also ==
- Climate change in Ohio
- United States Environmental Protection Agency
