= Clyde–Green Springs Schools =

School district in Ohio

Address
- 106 South Main Street Clyde, Ohio, 43410; United States

District information
- Motto: Students soaring into the future
- Grades: K–12
- Superintendent: Dennis Haft
- Schools: 4

Students and staff
- Teachers: 129

Other information
- Website: www.clyde.k12.oh.us

Clyde–Green Springs Schools, officially the Clyde–Green Springs Exempted Village School District, is a public school district in southeastern Sandusky County and northern Seneca County, Ohio, United States, that mainly serves the cities of Clyde and Green Springs and the surrounding area. District offices are located in Clyde and the district includes one high school, one middle school, and two elementary schools.

== Facilities ==
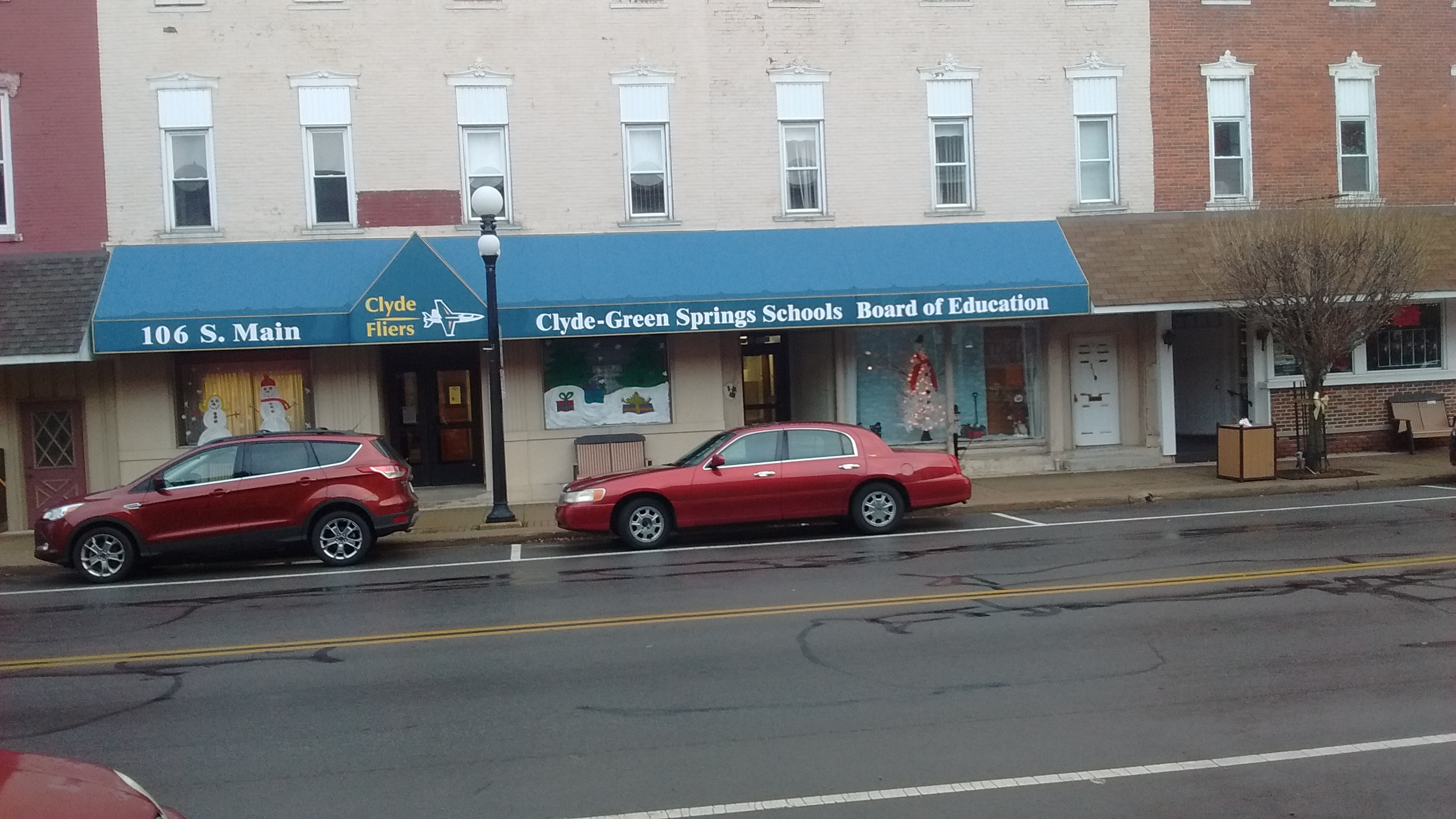
District offices in downtown Clyde

=== Elementary schools ===
- Clyde Elementary School (Clyde)
- Green Springs Elementary School (Green Springs)

=== Middle schools ===
- McPherson Middle School (Clyde)

=== High schools ===
- Clyde High School (Clyde)

== Incidents ==
=== School district treasury theft ===
On January 22, 2010, former superintendent Todd Helms, who was superintendent from 2002 until 2008, was charged with stealing $295,081 from the district. He pleaded guilty and received a sentence of 8 years in prison and restitution.

On May 13, 2015, Helms was released, after serving five years of his original sentence, due to factors including "the nonviolent nature of his offenses and the fact that he's paid a substantial amount of the restitution he [owed]." As of May 17, 2015, Helms still owed $32,500.
