= Plug-in electric vehicles in Ohio =

As of May 2022, there were about 24,500 electric vehicles in Ohio.

== Government policy ==
As of 2020, the state government charges a $200 annual registration fee for electric vehicles.

== Charging stations ==
As of January 2022, there were around 900 public charging stations in Ohio.

The Infrastructure Investment and Jobs Act, signed into law in November 2021, allocated US$140 million to charging stations in Ohio. Twenty-seven station locations near Interstate highways as part of the related National Electric Vehicle Infrastructure Program were identified on July 13, 2023, with sixteen more planned along other highways in the state system. The Ohio Turnpike added charging units to eight of its service areas by September 14, 2023.

== Manufacturing ==
Ohio was historically a manufacturing hub for gasoline-powered cars, which has led many electric vehicle manufacturers to establish manufacturing hubs in the state.

== By region ==
=== Akron ===
As of June 2022, there were 22 public charging stations in Akron.

=== Canton ===
The first public DC charging stations in Canton were installed in January 2021.

=== Cincinnati ===
As of March 2022, the Cincinnati municipal government has stopped purchasing new gasoline-powered vehicles for the municipal fleet.

=== Cleveland ===
As of October 2022, there were five public charging stations in Shaker Heights, the highest per-capita number in the Cleveland metropolitan area.

=== Columbus ===
As of 2018, 2% of all new vehicles sold in the Columbus metropolitan area were electric.

=== Dayton ===
The first electric vehicles in the Dayton city fleet were introduced in December 2022.
