= Clyde, Ohio =

- City
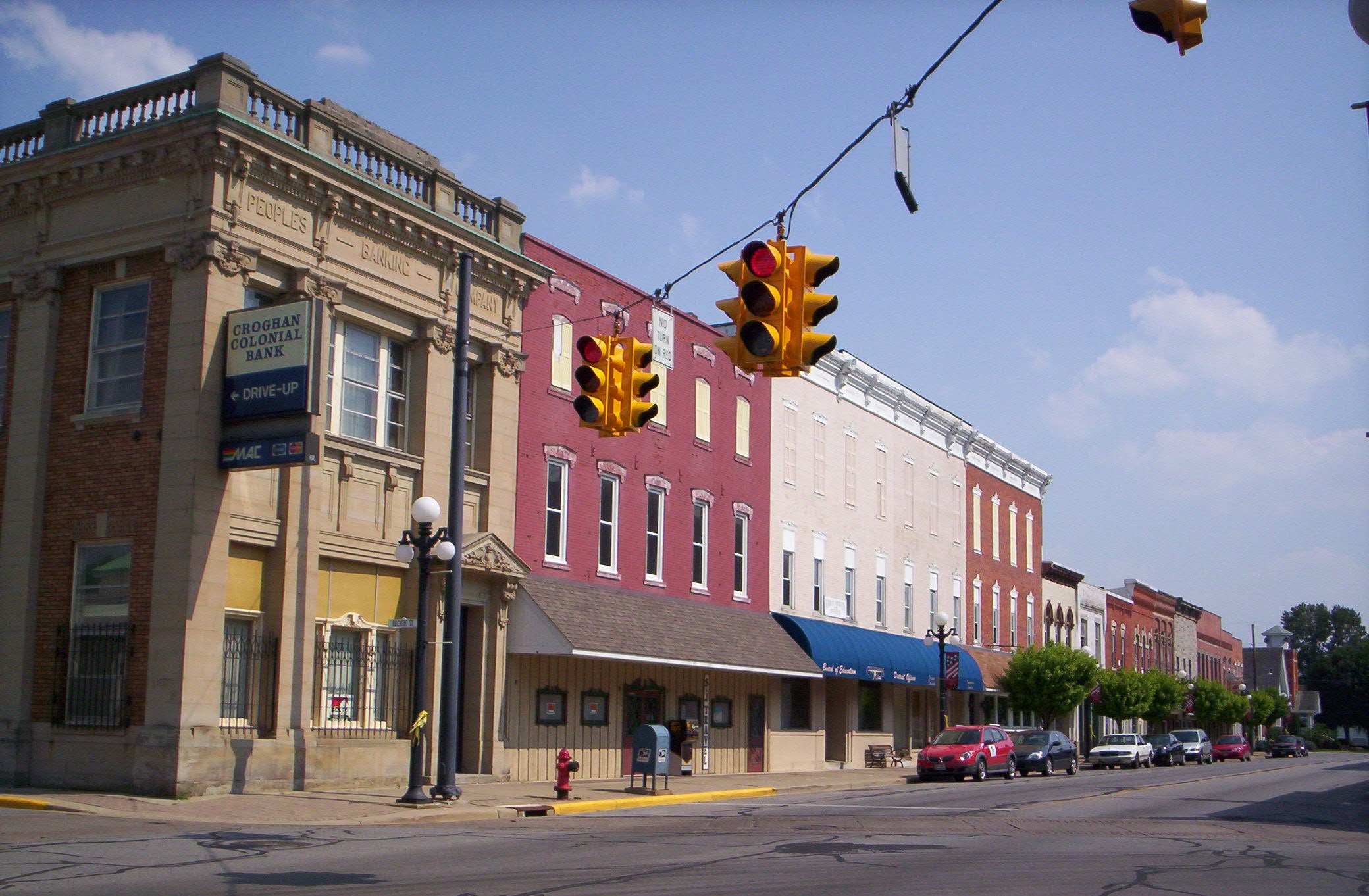
- Downtown Clyde, Ohio on South Main Street.

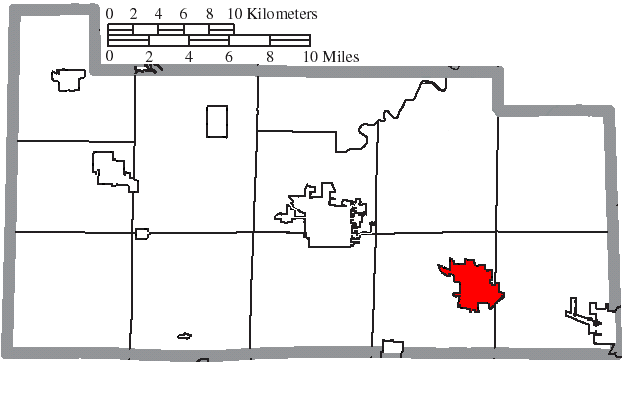
- Location of Clyde in Sandusky County

- Location within Ohio Location within the United States
- Coordinates: 41°18′36″N 82°59′26″W
- Country: United States
- State: Ohio
- County: Sandusky

Government
  - Type: Council-manager
  - Mayor: Doug McCauley

Area
  - Total: 5.28 sq mi (13.67 km^{2})
  - Land: 5.22 sq mi (13.53 km^{2})
  - Water: 0.050 sq mi (0.13 km^{2})
- Elevation: 699 ft (213 m)

Population (2020)
  - Total: 6,294
  - Estimate (2023): 6,337
  - Density: 1,204.5/sq mi (465.07/km^{2})
- Time zone: UTC-5 (Eastern (EST))
  - Summer (DST): UTC-4 (EDT)
- ZIP code: 43410
- Area code: 419
- FIPS code: 39-16308
- GNIS feature ID: 2393577
- Website: https://clydeohio.org

Clyde /ˈklaɪd/ is a city in Sandusky County, Ohio, United States, located 8 miles (13 km) southeast of Fremont. The population was 6,294 at the time of the 2020 census. The National Arbor Day Foundation has designated Clyde as a Tree City USA.

The town is known for having served as inspiration for the setting of Sherwood Anderson's 1919 collection of short stories Winesburg, Ohio.

== History ==
In the 1700s, the area of Ohio, including present-day Clyde, was inhabited by the Wyandot tribe. The distinction of first settler of Clyde goes to Jesse Benton. Claims that the first settler was Samuel Pogue are not entirely wrong as sometime during the war of 1812, Pogue drove a stake near the spring in the west part of Clyde with the intention of settling there after the war concluded. When Pogue returned in 1820 to take formal possession of the land, he found Jesse Benton had already built a cabin on the land. Shortly after Pogues arrival, Benton ceded his claim of the land to Pogue for a barrel of whiskey. Pogue lived in the Benton cabin until his death in 1828.

Clyde was named after Clyde, New York.

Early in the 20th century, Clyde joined the automobile revolution, hosting the pioneering brass era company, Elmore Manufacturing Company. Elmore was taken over by General Motors in 1909 and operations were moved to Detroit in 1919. However, Louis Krebs resigned from Elmore when General Motors took over and formed his own company which later became the Clydesdale Motor Truck Company. After General Motors moved out, Krebs acquired their site in Clyde for his own operations. The buildings, by this time owned by Clyde Porcelain Steel, burned down on November 11, 1945.

The Whirlpool Corporation purchased the Clyde Porcelain Steel Co. in 1952. It began producing washing machines there and then purchased the adjacent property of the Bendix Corporation in 1954, which produced belt-driven washing machines, making it the sole producer of washing machines in the area for the next six decades.

President Donald Trump visited Whirlpool Corporation in Clyde on August 6, 2020, as part of the 2020 United States presidential election campaign. Trump was the first president to visit Sandusky County in over 100 years.

=== Cancer cluster ===
In 2006, the Ohio Department of Health recognized that the incidence of child cancer cases in the Clyde area was abnormally high, and in 2007, the Ohio Environmental Protection Agency started investigating possible causes. After the Ohio Environmental Protection Agency carried out soil tests in the Whirlpool Corporation's former corporate park, Whirlpool Park, in Green Springs, Ohio, it was apparent that soil on the property contained polychlorinated biphenyls. Whirlpool Corporation faced two lawsuits as the park is perhaps the most well known suspected cause of the cluster. This lawsuit was dismissed in 2014, and the other, Sandusky County v. Whirlpool Corporation, was withdrawn in 2015. In January 2016, the EPA reported that Whirlpool Park had been cleared of PCB contamination.

== Geography ==
According to the United States Census Bureau, the city has a total area of 5.09 square miles (13.18 km^{2}), of which 5.04 square miles (13.05 km^{2}) is land and 0.05 square miles (0.13 km^{2}) is water.

== Demographics ==
Historical population
Census	Pop.	Note	%±
1860	701		—
1880	2,380		—
1890	2,327		−2.2%
1900	2,515		8.1%
1910	2,815		11.9%
1920	3,099		10.1%
1930	3,159		1.9%
1940	3,174		0.5%
1950	4,083		28.6%
1960	4,826		18.2%
1970	5,503		14.0%
1980	5,489		−0.3%
1990	5,776		5.2%
2000	6,064		5.0%
2010	6,325		4.3%
2020	6,294		−0.5%
2023 (est.)	6,337		0.7%

=== 2020 census ===
As of the 2020 census, Clyde had a population of 6,294. The median age was 40.8 years. 23.5% of residents were under the age of 18 and 18.1% of residents were 65 years of age or older. For every 100 females there were 97.5 males, and for every 100 females age 18 and over there were 96.3 males age 18 and over.

The racial makeup of the city was 89.6% White, 0.9% Black or African American, 0.3% American Indian and Alaska Native, 0.3% Asian, less than 0.1% Native Hawaiian and Other Pacific Islander, 2.3% some other race, and 6.6% two or more races. Hispanic or Latino of any race were 7.9% of the population.

98.7% of residents lived in urban areas, while 1.3% lived in rural areas.

There were 2,543 households in Clyde, of which 29.1% had children under the age of 18 living in them. Of all households, 43.8% were married-couple households, 19.4% were households with a male householder and no spouse or partner present, and 27.9% were households with a female householder and no spouse or partner present. About 28.7% of all households were made up of individuals and 13.0% had someone living alone who was 65 years of age or older.

There were 2,727 housing units, of which 6.7% were vacant. Among occupied housing units, 70.5% were owner-occupied and 29.5% were renter-occupied. The homeowner vacancy rate was 1.9% and the rental vacancy rate was 5.5%.

Racial composition as of the 2020 census
Race	Number	Percent
White	5,637	89.6%
Black or African American	57	0.9%
American Indian and Alaska Native	17	0.3%
Asian	22	0.3%
Native Hawaiian and Other Pacific Islander	2	<0.1%
Some other race	144	2.3%
Two or more races	415	6.6%
Hispanic or Latino (of any race)	499	7.9%

=== 2010 census ===
As of the census of 2010, there were 6,325 people, 2,484 households, and 1,687 families living in the city. The population density was 1,255.0 inhabitants per square mile (484.6/km^{2}). There were 2,707 housing units at an average density of 537.1 per square mile (207.4/km^{2}). The racial makeup of the city was 94.4% White, 0.6% African American, 0.3% Native American, 0.4% Asian, 1.5% from other races, and 2.7% from two or more races. Hispanic or Latino of any race were 5.9% of the population.

There were 2,484 households, of which 35.5% had children under the age of 18 living with them, 47.0% were married couples living together, 14.7% had a female householder with no husband present, 6.3% had a male householder with no wife present, and 32.1% were non-families. 26.8% of all households comprised individuals, and 12.2% had someone living alone who was 65 years of age or older. The average household size was 2.50, and the average family size was 2.99.

The median age in the city was 37.4 years. 26.3% of residents were under the age of 18; 8.1% were between the ages of 18 and 24; 25.7% were from 25 to 44; 26.1% were from 45 to 64; and 13.8% were 65 years of age or older. The gender makeup of the city was 48.7% male and 51.3% female.

=== 2000 census ===
As of the census of 2000, there were 6,064 people, 2,304 households, and 1,633 families living in the city. The population density was 1,381.5 inhabitants per square mile (533.4/km^{2}). There were 2,471 housing units at an average density of 563.0 per square mile (217.4/km^{2}). The racial makeup of the city was 96.04% White, 0.15% African American, 0.12% Native American, 0.26% Asian, 0.03% Pacific Islander, 2.21% from other races, and 1.19% from two or more races. Hispanic or Latino of any race were 4.70% of the population.

There were 2,304 households, out of which 35.0% had children under the age of 18 living with them, 53.9% were married couples living together, 12.4% had a female householder with no husband present, and 29.1% were non-families. 24.4% of all households were made up of individuals, and 9.5% had someone living alone who was 65 years of age or older. The average household size was 2.59 and the average family size was 3.07.

In the city the population was spread out, with 27.0% under the age of 18, 8.7% from 18 to 24, 29.3% from 25 to 44, 22.2% from 45 to 64, and 12.8% who were 65 years of age or older. The median age was 35 years. For every 100 females, there were 91.7 males. For every 100 females age 18 and over, there were 89.4 males.

The median income for a household in the city was $39,764, and the median income for a family was $45,646. Males had a median income of $32,189 versus $23,549 for females. The per capita income for the city was $17,966. About 6.8% of families and 8.6% of the population were below the poverty line, including 11.4% of those under age 18 and 7.9% of those age 65 or over.

== Economy ==
Clyde is the home of a Whirlpool Corporation plant.

== Education ==
Clyde is served by the Clyde-Green Springs school district.

=== Schools ===
- Clyde High School (Grades 9–12)
- Clyde Elementary School (Grades K-4)
- Green Springs Elementary (Grades K-5)
- McPherson Middle School (Grades 6–8)
- Harvest Temple Christian Academy (Grades K-12, Preschool, day care)

== Media ==
Clyde was served in print by the weekly newspaper The Clyde Enterprise for nearly 138 years, until its closure by Civitas Media in 2016.

Clean Air Radio Network, a Christian radio network broadcasting in Clyde, Findlay, and Coshocton, is owned and operated by Harvest Temple Christian Academy in Clyde.

The town was the setting for the 1990 film Welcome Home, Roxy Carmichael starring Winona Ryder.

== Notable people ==
- Sherwood Anderson, author
- Tim Anderson, professional football player
- Allie Luse Dick, music teacher
- Thaddeus B. Hurd, local historian
- Charles H. McCleary, Union Army Medal of Honor recipient
- James B. McPherson, Union major general
- George W. Norris, United States senator from Nebraska
- Rodger Young, Medal of Honor recipient and World War II veteran
