= Clyde High School (Ohio) =

Location
- 1015 Race Street; Clyde, Ohio 43410; United States; 41°17′25″N 82°59′09″W

Information
- Type: Public
- School district: Clyde–Green Springs Exempted Village School District
- Principal: Allison Carter
- Teaching staff: 38.00 (FTE)
- Grades: 9–12
- Enrollment: 550 (2025-2026)
- Student to teacher ratio: 15.74
- Colors: Blue and gold
- Athletics conference: Northern Ohio Conference
- Team name: Fliers
- Publication: Race Street Journal
- Website: clyde.k12.oh.us/home/clyde-high-school

Clyde High School (CHS) is a public high school in Clyde, Ohio, United States. It is the only high school in the Clyde–Green Springs Schools and mainly serves students from the city of Clyde, the village of Green Springs, and the surrounding area in southern Sandusky and northern Seneca counties. Athletic teams are known as the Fliers and the school colors are blue and gold.

== Facilities ==
In 2010, Clyde High School was renovated with funding from the Ohio School Facilities Commission and local voters. Upgrades to the building included an auxiliary gymnasium, additional administrative office space, whole-building air conditioning, an enlarged cafeteria, and a new main entrance to the school.

A new wing was added to the building in the late 1990s, including updated science labs, a new media center, and additional classrooms and lockers. This addition was funded with a voter levy.

In 2005, the school received a performing arts wing, including rehearsal rooms for bands and choirs and an auditorium, which seats over 800 — enough for the entire CHS student body. The space was funded by private donation pledges and a voter levy. It replaced the auditorium that stood at the old McPherson Middle School, which was constructed in 1912.

== Athletics ==
Clyde competes in the Ohio High School Athletic Association (OHSAA) as a member of the Northern Ohio Conference.

=== State championships ===
- Football – 1995, 2019
- Wrestling – 1995
- Boys track and field – 1953

== Notable alumni ==
- Tim Anderson - Professional football player in the National Football League (NFL)
