= Arrowsmith =

Arrowsmith or Arrowsmiths may refer to:

- A person who makes arrows (see fletching and bowyer)
- Arrowsmith (novel), by Sinclair Lewis
  - Arrowsmith (film), 1931 adaptation of the novel
  - Arrowsmith (DuPont Show of the Month), 1960 adaptation of the novel aired as part of the DuPont Show of the Month
- Arrowsmith (comics)
- Arrowsmith, players of Darts
- The Arrowsmith Program, a brain training program for students with learning disabilities
- Arrowsmith School, a school for children with learning disabilities
- Arrowsmith Holidays, a British holiday tour operator later part of Laker Airways
- J. W. Arrowsmith, British book printer, publisher, and imprint
- Arrowsmith System, a knowledge discovery system

== People ==
- Arrowsmith (surname)

== Places ==
- Arrowsmith Peninsula, Antarctica
- Mount Arrowsmith (disambiguation), mountains in Canada, Antarctica, and New Zealand
- Arrowsmith, Western Australia, a town
- Arrowsmith River, a river in Western Australia
- River Arrowsmith (Queensland), later renamed Coomera River, Australia
- Arrowsmith Township, McLean County, Illinois
  - Arrowsmith, Illinois, a village in the township
- Arrowsmiths, Ohio, an extinct town
