= Northeastern Local School District (Defiance County, Ohio) =

School district in Ohio, United States

Address
- 5855 Domersville Road Defiance, Ohio, 43512; United States

District information
- Type: Public
- Grades: KG–12
- Schools: 3
- NCES District ID: 3904672

Students and staff
- Students: 940 (2024–2025)
- Teachers: 50.00 (on an FTE basis) (2024–2025)
- Staff: 181.30 (on an FTE basis) (2024–2025)
- Student–teacher ratio: 18.80 (2024–2025)

Other information
- Website: www.tinora.org

Northeastern Local School District is one of six school districts in Defiance County located in the state of Ohio. The district serves portions of Defiance, as well as the townships of Adams, most of Noble, northern Richland, and Tiffin. Each township originally had a separate school within the township, but later they consolidated to form the Northeastern Local School District.

The original schools in the system were Noble Elementary School, North Richland-Adams High School, and Tiffin Elementary School. In 1965, a new high school was opened called Tinora High School, each building giving two letters to form the name, (Ti) ffin, (No) ble, North (R)ichland, (A)dams. Over time, the school grew again, and built a new elementary school, Tinora Elementary. Building this school left no further need for the other elementaries, which were falling into disrepair. Tiffin school and North Richland-Adams were shut down, being the two oldest buildings, and Noble School now houses Kindergarten and First Grade. Second through sixth grades are housed at the Tinora Elementary School, seventh and eighth grade students attend Tinora Junior High School, and grades nine through twelve are housed at Tinora High School.

Another school in association with the school district was the Saint Michael's Alternate Learning Center run by Saint Michael's of the Ridge Roman Catholic Church.
