= Arrowsmith (surname) =

Arrowsmith is an English-language occupational surname. Notable people with the surname include:

- Aaron Arrowsmith (1750–1823), English cartographer and publisher
- Alex Arrowsmith (born 1982), American singer-songwriter
- Alf Arrowsmith (1942–2005), English footballer
- Alfred Arrowsmith (died 1935), Trinidadian cricketer
- Anna Arrowsmith, pseudonym Anna Span (born 1972), English film director
- Arthur Arrowsmith (1880–1954), English footballer
- Albert Arrowsmith (1887–1958), Australian rugby league footballer
- Alex Arrowsmith (born 1982), American singer-songwriter
- Brian Arrowsmith (1940–2020), English footballer and manager
- Charlotte Arrowsmith, British actress
- Cheryl Arrowsmith (born 1959), Canadian structural biologist
- Chris Arrowsmith (born 1966), British slalom canoeist
- Clive Arrowsmith, British photographer
- Douglas Arrowsmith, Canadian film director and writer
- Edmund Arrowsmith (c.1585–1628), English Catholic priest and saint
- Edwin Arrowsmith (1909–1992), British colonial administrator
- Gord Arrowsmith (born 1944), Canadian soccer referee
- James Arrowsmith (1839–1913), British printer and publisher
- Jenna Arrowsmith (born 1980), British figure skater
- John Arrowsmith (scholar) (1602–1659), English theologian and academic
- John Arrowsmith (cartographer) (1790–1873), English cartographer, nephew of Aaron Arrowsmith
- John C. Arrowsmith (1894–1985), United States Army general
- Mary Noel Arrowsmith (1890–1965), American educator
- Pat Arrowsmith (1930–2023), British writer and peace campaigner
- Ramón Arrowsmith, American geoscientist and academic
- Robert Arrowsmith (born 1952), English cricketer
- Sue Arrowsmith (1950–2014), British artist
- Tony Arrowsmith (1887–1950), English footballer
- William Arrowsmith (1924–1992), American classicist, academic and translator

== See also ==
- Barbara Arrowsmith Young (born 1951), Canadian author, entrepreneur and lecturer
- Percy and Florence Arrowsmith, British couple erroneously included in the Guinness Book of Records
- Fletcher (surname)
