= Noble Township, Ohio =

Noble Township, Ohio may refer to several places:

- Noble Township, Auglaize County, Ohio
- Noble Township, Defiance County, Ohio
- Noble Township, Noble County, Ohio
