= Hispanics and Latinos in Ohio =

Hispanic and Latino Ohioans
Total population
- About 607,000 (5.1% of Ohio, American Community Survey estimate published 2024)

Regions with significant populations
- Franklin, Cuyahoga, Hamilton, Lorain and Lucas counties

Languages
- English, Spanish

Hispanic and Latino Americans in Ohio are residents of the U.S. state of Ohio who trace their origins to Spain or Latin America. As of 2024, American Community Survey estimates published by the Ohio Development Services Agency put their number at about 607,000, or 5.1 percent of the state's population. The United States Census Bureau estimated the Hispanic or Latino share at 5.5 percent in July 2025. The population has grown in every census since 1990, when it was 1.3 percent of the state. Mexican and Puerto Rican families are the largest groups, and the community has roots in the steel towns of northern Ohio that go back to the early 1920s.

== Demographics ==
=== Population since 1990 ===
In 1980, Ohio had fewer than 120,000 Hispanic residents, or 1.1 percent of the population. The table below shows the counts from each census since 1990.

Hispanic or Latino population of Ohio, 1990 to 2025
Census	Hispanic or Latino residents	Share of Ohio population	Change since previous census
1990	139,696	1.3%	
2000	217,123	1.9%	+77,427 (+55.4%)
2010	354,674	3.1%	+137,551 (+63.4%)
2020	521,308	4.4%	+166,634 (+47.0%)
2025 estimate	Not published	5.5%	

The changes for 2000 to 2010 and 2010 to 2020 are calculated from the census counts. Ohio's total population grew 2.3 percent from 2010 to 2020, and Hispanic residents accounted for about 63 percent of the state's numeric growth in those years. In the 2000s they accounted for about three quarters of it. Both figures are calculated from the total counts for 2000, 2010 and 2020.

=== Origins ===
In 1990, Mexicans were 41.4 percent of Ohio's Hispanic residents, Puerto Ricans were 32.8 percent, Cubans were 2.5 percent, and people of other origins were 23.2 percent. The American Community Survey now shows a wider mix. Mexican ancestry accounts for 41 percent of Hispanic Ohioans, Puerto Rican for 25 percent, Guatemalan for 4 percent, and Dominican, Honduran and Cuban for 3 percent each. The remaining 21 percent are of other origins.

About 249,100 Ohioans have Mexican ancestry, a group that has nearly tripled since 2000. About one in five of them was born in Mexico, and 21,600 people arrived from Mexico after 2010. More than 67,400 Hispanic Ohioans have Central American ancestry, and 13,700 were born in Venezuela.

=== Geography ===
As of the 2024 snapshot, 34 percent of Hispanic Ohioans live in five cities: Columbus (90,000), Cleveland (52,200), Toledo (24,400), Cincinnati (21,400) and Lorain (19,800). The largest counts are in Franklin County (111,751) and Cuyahoga County (93,073). The highest shares are in rural and small-city counties in the north and northwest: Defiance (12.1 percent), Lorain (11.6 percent), Sandusky (11.6 percent), Fulton (9.8 percent) and Henry (8.8 percent).

Origins differ by region. In the 2021 American Community Survey, Puerto Ricans made up more than two thirds of Latinos in Lorain and Mahoning counties and 60 percent in Cuyahoga County. Mexicans made up more than 75 percent of Latinos in several northwest Ohio counties, and Franklin County had an unusually large share of Central Americans, especially Salvadorans.
