= Joseph T. Flanigan =

American politician

- Born: Defiance County, Ohio
- Died: June 15, 1894; January 2, 1970

Joseph T. Flanigan (June 15, 1894 – January 2, 1970) was a member of the Michigan House of Representatives 1951-1952 for Genesee County, 1st District. Born in Defiance County, Ohio, Flanigan served in the US Army during World War I.

After his discharge as a Sergeant with the Sixty-fifth Engineer Tank Corps in France during World War I, he moved to Flint, Michigan. There, he was known as "Flint's Number One Irishman" because of how he represented the city of Flint.
