= 2000 United States presidential election in Ohio =

- November 7, 2000
- Turnout: 63.73% (▼3.68 pp)

Nominee	George W. Bush	Al Gore
Party	Republican	Democratic
Home state	Texas	Tennessee
Running mate	Dick Cheney	Joe Lieberman
Electoral vote	21	0
Popular vote	2,351,209	2,186,190
Percentage	49.97%	46.46%

Bush
40–50%
50–60%
60–70%
70–80%
80–90%
90–100%
Gore
40–50%
50–60%
60–70%
70–80%
80–90%
90–100%
President before election
Bill Clinton
Democratic
Elected President
George W. Bush
Republican

The 2000 United States presidential election in Ohio took place on November 7, 2000, and was part of the 2000 United States presidential election. Voters chose 21 representatives, or electors, to the Electoral College, who voted for president and vice president.

Ohio was won by Texas governor George W. Bush by a 3.51% margin of victory. Prior to the election, most news organizations considered Ohio a swing state. Bush performed strongly in most parts of rural Ohio. Gore kept the race close by running up big margins in Cuyahoga County, home of Cleveland. Gore also won the traditional working-class counties of Mahoning, Portage, and Trumbull counties. Gore only narrowly took Franklin County, home of Columbus, which at the time was a swing county but is now seen as reliably Democratic, having given Democratic nominees a majority of the vote in every election since. As of 2024, this was the last presidential election in Ohio where the Democrat won Clark County, home of Springfield.

Ohio kept its streak of voting for the winner in every election since 1964, but this was the first election since Ohio voted for Richard Nixon in 1960 where the state failed to back the national popular vote winner. Ohio was one of nine states that voted for Bill Clinton twice that Bush managed to flip. Had Gore won the state's electoral votes instead of Bush, the election would have gone his way. Bush became the first Republican to win the White House without carrying Erie County and Franklin County since Benjamin Harrison in 1888.

== General election ==
=== Polling ===
Poll source	Date(s)	Sample size	Margin of error	George W. Bush (R)	Al Gore (D)	Ralph Nader (G)	Other / undecided (Note: Calculated by taking the difference of 100% and all other listed candidates combined. For polls that do not report a figure for Nader, this includes his support.)
Zogby Analytics	November 5, 2000	589	—	48%	45%	5%	2%
Harris Insights & Analytics	November 3, 2000	10,975	—	49%	46%	4%	1%
University of Cincinnati (Ohio Poll)	November 3, 2000	1,273	—	53%	43%	3%	1%
Mason-Dixon Polling & Strategy	November 2, 2000	625	—	46%	40%	5%	9%
Zogby Analytics	November 2, 2000	600	—	51%	41%	3%	5%
SurveyUSA	November 1, 2000	500	—	50%	43%	—	7%
Columbus Dispatch	October 31, 2000	2,050	—	52%	42%	3%	3%
Zogby Analytics	October 30, 2000	600	—	48%	40%	4%	8%
Zogby Analytics	October 27, 2000	600	—	49%	43%	3%	5%
Rasmussen Reports	October 23, 2000	929	—	48%	39%	—	13%
University of Cincinnati (Ohio Poll)	October 22, 2000	666	—	50%	42%	4%	4%
Mason-Dixon Polling & Strategy	October 19, 2000	625	—	45%	41%	4%	10%

=== Results ===
Official state results from the Ohio secretary of state are as follows:

2000 United States presidential election in Ohio
Party	Candidate	Votes	Percentage	Electoral votes
Republican	George W. Bush	2,351,209	49.97%	21
Democratic	Al Gore	2,186,190	46.46%	0
Not Designated	Ralph Nader	117,857	2.51%	0
Not Designated	Pat Buchanan	26,724	0.57%	0
Libertarian	Harry Browne	13,475	0.29%	0
Natural Law	John Hagelin	6,169	0.13%	0
Not Designated	Howard Phillips	3,823	0.08%	0
Write-ins	Write-ins	10	<0.01%	0
Totals		4,705,457	100.00%	21

==== Results by county ====
County	George W. Bush Republican		Al Gore Democratic		Ralph Nader Not Designated		Various candidates Other parties		Margin		Total votes cast
County	#	%	#	%	#	%	#	%	#	%	Total votes cast
Adams	6,380	62.34%	3,581	34.99%	162	1.58%	112	1.09%	2,799	27.35%	10,235
Allen	28,647	65.41%	13,996	31.96%	760	1.74%	392	0.90%	14,651	33.45%	43,795
Ashland	13,533	63.66%	6,685	31.45%	563	2.65%	477	2.24%	6,848	32.21%	21,258
Ashtabula	17,940	45.45%	19,831	50.24%	1,109	2.81%	592	1.50%	-1,891	-4.79%	39,472
Athens	9,703	38.13%	13,158	51.71%	1,663	6.54%	923	3.63%	-3,455	-13.58%	25,447
Auglaize	13,770	69.22%	5,564	27.97%	372	1.87%	186	0.94%	8,206	41.25%	19,892
Belmont	12,625	41.89%	15,980	53.02%	723	2.40%	813	2.70%	-3,355	-11.13%	30,141
Brown	10,027	61.03%	5,972	36.35%	269	1.64%	161	0.98%	4,055	24.68%	16,429
Butler	86,587	63.32%	46,390	33.93%	2,708	1.98%	1,052	0.77%	40,197	29.39%	136,737
Carroll	6,732	54.91%	4,960	40.45%	271	2.21%	298	2.43%	1,772	14.46%	12,261
Champaign	9,220	58.80%	5,955	37.98%	346	2.21%	159	1.01%	3,265	20.82%	15,680
Clark	27,660	48.06%	27,984	48.62%	1,347	2.34%	568	0.99%	-324	-0.56%	57,559
Clermont	47,129	67.45%	20,927	29.95%	1,303	1.86%	518	0.74%	26,202	37.50%	69,877
Clinton	9,824	65.19%	4,791	31.79%	325	2.16%	130	0.86%	5,033	33.40%	15,070
Columbiana	21,804	49.08%	20,657	46.50%	1,217	2.74%	749	1.69%	1,147	2.58%	44,427
Coshocton	8,243	57.77%	5,594	39.21%	295	2.07%	136	0.95%	2,649	18.56%	14,268
Crawford	11,666	60.84%	6,721	35.05%	536	2.80%	253	1.32%	4,945	25.79%	19,176
Cuyahoga	192,099	33.42%	359,913	62.62%	16,956	2.95%	5,814	1.01%	-167,814	-29.20%	574,782
Darke	14,817	63.68%	7,741	33.27%	452	1.94%	257	1.10%	7,076	30.41%	23,267
Defiance	9,540	58.74%	6,175	38.02%	365	2.25%	162	1.00%	3,365	20.72%	16,242
Delaware	36,639	66.13%	17,134	30.93%	1,212	2.19%	418	0.75%	19,505	35.20%	55,403
Erie	16,105	45.99%	17,732	50.64%	872	2.49%	306	0.87%	-1,627	-4.65%	35,015
Fairfield	33,523	61.97%	19,065	35.24%	1,115	2.06%	391	0.72%	14,458	26.73%	54,094
Fayette	5,685	61.27%	3,363	36.25%	165	1.78%	65	0.70%	2,322	25.02%	9,278
Franklin	197,862	47.78%	202,018	48.79%	10,702	2.58%	3,492	0.84%	-4,156	-1.01%	414,074
Fulton	11,546	61.10%	6,805	36.01%	376	1.99%	169	0.89%	4,741	25.09%	18,896
Gallia	7,511	58.79%	4,872	38.13%	215	1.68%	178	1.39%	2,639	20.66%	12,776
Geauga	25,417	59.66%	15,327	35.98%	1,405	3.30%	451	1.06%	10,090	23.68%	42,600
Greene	37,946	58.20%	25,059	38.43%	1,592	2.44%	607	0.93%	12,887	19.77%	65,204
Guernsey	8,181	53.02%	6,643	43.05%	405	2.62%	201	1.30%	1,538	9.97%	15,430
Hamilton	204,175	54.03%	161,578	42.76%	9,222	2.44%	2,924	0.77%	42,597	11.27%	377,899
Hancock	20,985	68.54%	8,798	28.74%	592	1.93%	242	0.79%	12,187	39.80%	30,617
Hardin	7,124	59.03%	4,557	37.76%	243	2.01%	144	1.19%	2,567	21.27%	12,068
Harrison	3,417	47.72%	3,351	46.80%	192	2.68%	201	2.81%	66	0.92%	7,161
Henry	8,530	64.37%	4,367	32.95%	258	1.95%	97	0.73%	4,163	31.42%	13,252
Highland	9,728	62.98%	5,328	34.49%	245	1.59%	146	0.95%	4,400	28.49%	15,447
Hocking	5,702	53.01%	4,474	41.60%	291	2.71%	289	2.69%	1,228	11.41%	10,756
Holmes	6,754	73.85%	2,066	22.59%	172	1.88%	153	1.67%	4,688	51.26%	9,145
Huron	12,286	57.52%	8,183	38.31%	560	2.62%	331	1.55%	4,103	19.21%	21,360
Jackson	6,958	55.71%	5,131	41.08%	222	1.78%	179	1.43%	1,827	14.63%	12,490
Jefferson	15,038	43.42%	17,488	50.49%	897	2.59%	1,213	3.50%	-2,450	-7.07%	34,636
Knox	13,393	63.00%	7,133	33.55%	452	2.13%	282	1.33%	6,260	29.45%	21,260
Lake	51,747	50.45%	46,497	45.33%	3,166	3.09%	1,154	1.13%	5,250	5.12%	102,564
Lawrence	12,531	51.25%	11,307	46.24%	402	1.64%	212	0.87%	1,224	5.01%	24,452
Licking	37,180	59.52%	23,196	37.13%	1,498	2.40%	592	0.95%	13,984	22.39%	62,466
Logan	11,849	64.20%	5,945	32.21%	449	2.43%	212	1.15%	5,904	31.99%	18,455
Lorain	47,957	42.75%	59,809	53.32%	3,183	2.84%	1,231	1.10%	-11,852	-10.57%	112,180
Lucas	73,342	39.15%	108,344	57.83%	4,227	2.26%	1,437	0.77%	-35,002	-18.68%	187,350
Madison	8,892	60.63%	5,287	36.05%	299	2.04%	189	1.29%	3,605	24.58%	14,667
Mahoning	40,460	35.45%	69,212	60.65%	3,322	2.91%	1,125	0.99%	-28,752	-25.20%	114,119
Marion	13,617	54.87%	10,370	41.79%	588	2.37%	240	0.97%	3,247	13.08%	24,815
Medina	37,349	55.84%	26,635	39.82%	1,960	2.93%	939	1.40%	10,714	16.02%	66,883
Meigs	5,750	58.70%	3,674	37.51%	226	2.31%	145	1.48%	2,076	21.19%	9,795
Mercer	12,485	68.25%	5,212	28.49%	392	2.14%	205	1.12%	7,273	39.76%	18,294
Miami	26,037	60.78%	15,584	36.38%	879	2.05%	341	0.80%	10,453	24.40%	42,841
Monroe	3,145	44.20%	3,605	50.67%	149	2.09%	216	3.04%	-460	-6.47%	7,115
Montgomery	109,792	47.53%	114,597	49.61%	4,690	2.03%	1,908	0.83%	-4,805	-2.08%	230,987
Morgan	3,451	57.58%	2,261	37.73%	177	2.95%	104	1.74%	1,190	19.85%	5,993
Morrow	7,842	61.08%	4,529	35.28%	305	2.38%	163	1.27%	3,313	25.80%	12,839
Muskingum	17,995	55.16%	13,415	41.12%	882	2.70%	332	1.02%	4,580	14.04%	32,624
Noble	3,435	57.36%	2,296	38.34%	154	2.57%	103	1.72%	1,139	19.02%	5,988
Ottawa	9,917	49.66%	9,485	47.50%	432	2.16%	134	0.67%	432	2.16%	19,968
Paulding	5,210	58.24%	3,384	37.83%	242	2.71%	110	1.23%	1,826	20.41%	8,946
Perry	6,440	50.20%	5,895	45.95%	334	2.60%	159	1.24%	545	4.25%	12,828
Pickaway	10,717	60.41%	6,598	37.19%	276	1.56%	149	0.83%	4,119	23.22%	17,740
Pike	5,333	50.50%	4,923	46.62%	176	1.67%	128	1.21%	410	3.88%	10,560
Portage	28,271	44.95%	31,446	49.99%	2,340	3.72%	842	1.34%	-3,175	-5.04%	62,899
Preble	11,176	61.52%	6,375	35.09%	404	2.22%	211	1.16%	4,801	26.43%	18,166
Putnam	12,837	74.01%	4,063	23.43%	254	1.46%	190	1.10%	8,774	50.58%	17,344
Richland	30,138	57.10%	20,572	38.98%	1,306	2.47%	763	1.45%	9,566	18.12%	52,779
Ross	13,706	52.68%	11,662	44.83%	421	1.62%	227	0.87%	2,044	7.85%	26,016
Sandusky	13,699	53.21%	11,146	43.30%	587	2.28%	312	1.21%	2,553	9.91%	25,744
Scioto	15,022	50.17%	13,997	46.74%	590	1.97%	336	1.12%	1,025	3.43%	29,945
Seneca	13,863	56.93%	9,512	39.06%	666	2.74%	310	1.27%	4,351	17.87%	24,351
Shelby	12,476	63.43%	6,593	33.52%	392	1.99%	209	1.06%	5,883	29.91%	19,670
Stark	78,153	48.89%	75,308	47.11%	4,032	2.52%	2,351	1.47%	2,845	1.78%	159,844
Summit	96,721	43.02%	119,759	53.26%	5,955	2.65%	2,404	1.07%	-23,038	-10.24%	224,839
Trumbull	34,654	36.01%	57,643	59.90%	2,749	2.86%	1,193	1.24%	-22,989	-23.89%	96,239
Tuscarawas	19,549	52.67%	15,879	42.78%	1,061	2.86%	629	1.69%	3,670	9.89%	37,118
Union	11,502	67.56%	5,040	29.61%	336	1.97%	146	0.86%	6,462	37.95%	17,024
Van Wert	8,679	65.66%	4,209	31.84%	216	1.63%	115	0.87%	4,470	33.82%	13,219
Vinton	2,720	54.99%	2,037	41.18%	110	2.22%	79	1.60%	683	13.81%	4,946
Warren	48,318	69.95%	19,142	27.71%	1,067	1.54%	551	0.80%	29,176	42.24%	69,078
Washington	15,342	57.86%	10,383	39.16%	571	2.15%	219	0.83%	4,959	18.70%	26,515
Wayne	25,901	61.04%	14,779	34.83%	1,171	2.76%	585	1.38%	11,122	26.21%	42,436
Williams	9,941	62.45%	5,454	34.26%	347	2.18%	177	1.11%	4,487	28.19%	15,919
Wood	27,504	52.70%	22,687	43.47%	1,536	2.94%	467	0.89%	4,817	9.23%	52,194
Wyandot	6,113	62.21%	3,397	34.57%	191	1.94%	126	1.28%	2,716	27.64%	9,827
Totals	2,351,209	49.97%	2,186,190	46.46%	117,857	2.50%	50,201	1.07%	165,019	3.51%	4,705,457

===== Counties that flipped from Democratic to Republican =====
- Carroll (largest city: Carrollton)
- Columbiana (largest city: Salem)
- Gallia (largest city: Gallipolis)
- Guernsey (largest city: Cambridge)
- Harrison (largest city: Cadiz)
- Hocking (largest city: Logan)
- Huron (largest city: Norwalk)
- Jackson (largest city: Jackson)
- Lake (largest city: Mentor)
- Lawrence (largest city: Ironton)
- Meigs (largest city: Middleport)
- Noble (largest city: Caldwell)
- Ottawa (largest city: Port Clinton)
- Perry (largest city: New Lexington)
- Pike (largest city: Waverly)
- Ross (largest city: Chillicothe)
- Sandusky (largest city: Fremont)
- Scioto (largest city: Portsmouth)
- Seneca (largest city: Tiffin)
- Stark (largest city: Canton)
- Tuscarawas (largest city: New Philadelphia)
- Vinton (largest city: McArthur)
- Wood (largest city: Bowling Green)

==== By congressional district ====
Bush won 11 of 19 congressional districts. Both candidates won two districts held by the other party.

District	Gore	Bush	Representative
1st	50%	47%	Steve Chabot
2nd	32%	65%	Rob Portman
3rd	50%	47%	Tony P. Hall
4th	35%	62%	Mike Oxley
5th	39%	57%	Paul Gillmor
6th	41%	56%	Ted Strickland
7th	39%	58%	David Hobson
8th	34%	63%	John Boehner
9th	55%	42%	Marcy Kaptur
10th	52%	43%	Dennis Kucinich
11th	82%	15%	Stephanie Tubbs Jones
12th	46%	51%	John Kasich
12th	46%	51%	Pat Tiberi
13th	46%	50%	Sherrod Brown
14th	54%	42%	Thomas C. Sawyer
15th	44%	52%	Deborah Pryce
16th	42%	54%	Ralph Regula
17th	58%	38%	James Traficant
18th	45%	51%	Bob Ney
19th	50%	46%	Steve LaTourette

== See also ==
- United States presidential elections in Ohio
- Presidency of George W. Bush
