= Evansport, Ohio =

Unincorporated community in Ohio, U.S.

Coordinates: 41°25′34″N 84°23′47″W

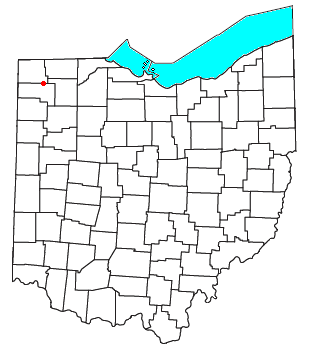
Location of Evansport, Ohio

Evansport is an unincorporated community in northern Tiffin Township, Defiance County, Ohio, United States. It has a post office with the ZIP code 43519.

== History ==
Evansport was platted in 1835 by Albert G. and Amos Evans, and named for them. A post office has been in operation at Evansport since 1837.
