= Arrowsmiths, Ohio =

Former human settlement in the USA

Coordinates: 41°21′00″N 84°40′16″W

Arrowsmiths is a ghost town in Farmer Township, Defiance County, Ohio, United States.

== History ==
A mill was operated by a Mr. Arrowsmith on Lost Creek until around 1846. A post office called Arrowsmiths was established in 1843, and remained in operation until 1866.
