= 1904 United States presidential election in Ohio =

- November 8, 1904
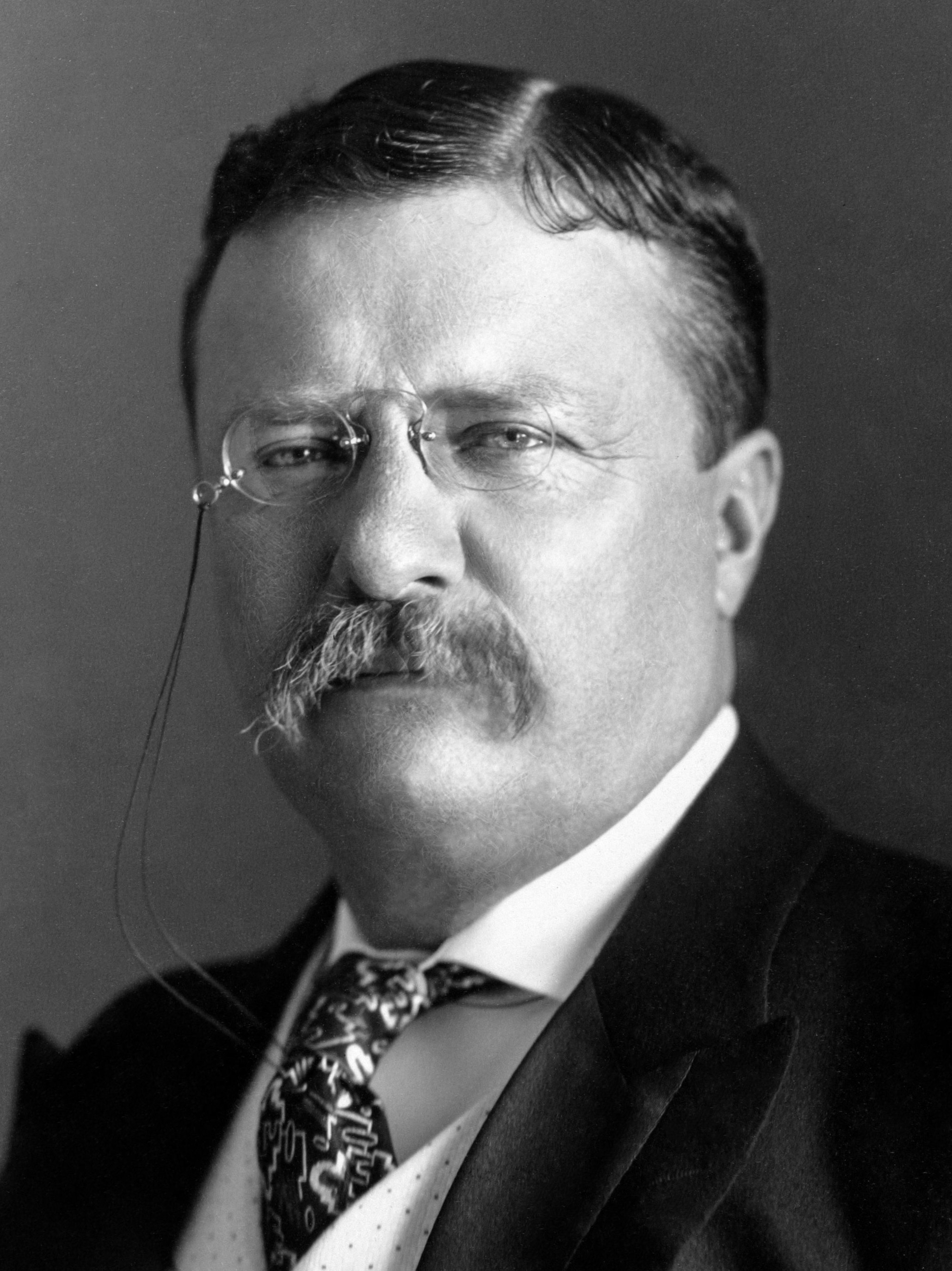

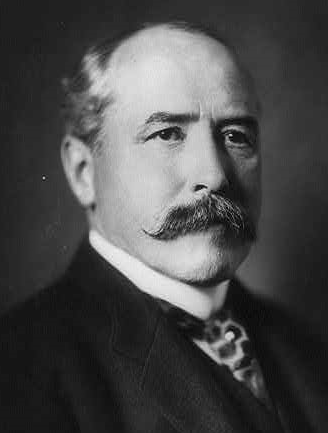
Nominee	Theodore Roosevelt	Alton B. Parker
Party	Republican	Democratic
Home state	New York	New York
Running mate	Charles W. Fairbanks	Henry G. Davis
Electoral vote	23	0
Popular vote	600,095	344,674
Percentage	59.75%	34.32%
County results
Roosevelt
40–50%
50–60%
60–70%
70–80%
80–90%
Parker
40–50%
50–60%
60–70%
President before election
Theodore Roosevelt
Republican
Elected President
Theodore Roosevelt
Republican

The 1904 United States presidential election in Ohio was held on November 8, 1904, as part of the 1904 United States presidential election. State voters chose 23 electors to the Electoral College, who voted for president and vice president.

Ohio was decisively won by the Republican Party candidate, incumbent President Theodore Roosevelt, with 59.75% of the popular vote. The Democratic Party candidate, Alton B. Parker, garnered a meager 34.32% of the popular vote. Roosevelt won the state by a margin of 25.43%.

== Results ==
1904 United States presidential election in Ohio
Party	Candidate	Votes	Percentage	Electoral votes
Republican	Theodore Roosevelt (incumbent)	600,095	59.75%	23
Democratic	Alton B. Parker	344,674	34.32%	0
Socialist	Eugene V. Debs	36,260	3.61%	0
Prohibition	Silas C. Swallow	19,339	1.93%	0
Socialist Labor	Charles Hunter Corregan	2,633	0.26%	0
People's	Thomas E. Watson	1,392	0.14%	0
Totals		1,004,393	100.0%	23

=== Results by county ===
County	Theodore Roosevelt Republican		Alton B. Parker Democratic		Eugene V. Debs Socialist		Various candidates Other parties		Margin		Total votes cast
County	#	%	#	%	#	%	#	%	#	%	Total votes cast
Adams	3,252	51.98%	2,796	44.69%	23	0.37%	185	2.96%	456	7.29%	6,256
Allen	6,091	52.50%	4,980	42.92%	270	2.33%	262	2.26%	1,111	9.58%	11,603
Ashland	2,747	44.94%	2,996	49.01%	24	0.39%	346	5.66%	-249	-4.07%	6,113
Ashtabula	8,906	75.89%	1,647	14.03%	785	6.69%	397	3.38%	7,259	61.86%	11,735
Athens	6,352	75.84%	1,594	19.03%	95	1.13%	335	4.00%	4,758	56.81%	8,376
Auglaize	3,049	44.63%	3,619	52.98%	48	0.70%	115	1.68%	-570	-8.34%	6,831
Belmont	8,170	56.75%	4,801	33.35%	776	5.39%	649	4.51%	3,369	23.40%	14,396
Brown	2,730	42.40%	3,590	55.76%	17	0.26%	101	1.57%	-860	-13.36%	6,438
Butler	7,048	45.44%	7,397	47.69%	720	4.64%	346	2.23%	-349	-2.25%	15,511
Carroll	2,695	65.05%	1,278	30.85%	20	0.48%	150	3.62%	1,417	34.20%	4,143
Champaign	4,192	61.98%	2,336	34.54%	23	0.34%	212	3.13%	1,856	27.44%	6,763
Clark	9,355	62.02%	4,565	30.26%	764	5.06%	400	2.65%	4,790	31.76%	15,084
Clermont	4,207	53.77%	3,339	42.68%	134	1.71%	144	1.84%	868	11.09%	7,824
Clinton	3,937	65.79%	1,826	30.51%	9	0.15%	212	3.54%	2,111	35.28%	5,984
Columbiana	11,571	67.22%	4,203	24.42%	445	2.59%	994	5.77%	7,368	42.80%	17,213
Coshocton	3,715	49.45%	3,545	47.18%	84	1.12%	169	2.25%	170	2.26%	7,513
Crawford	3,314	39.90%	4,493	54.09%	347	4.18%	152	1.83%	-1,179	-14.19%	8,306
Cuyahoga	57,367	62.86%	24,202	26.52%	8,017	8.79%	1,670	1.83%	33,165	36.34%	91,256
Darke	5,203	49.26%	5,030	47.62%	54	0.51%	275	2.60%	173	1.64%	10,562
Defiance	3,032	47.43%	3,216	50.31%	35	0.55%	109	1.71%	-184	-2.88%	6,392
Delaware	4,163	58.82%	2,607	36.83%	51	0.72%	257	3.63%	1,556	21.98%	7,078
Erie	5,764	58.67%	3,648	37.13%	247	2.51%	166	1.69%	2,116	21.54%	9,825
Fairfield	4,084	45.26%	4,632	51.33%	29	0.32%	279	3.09%	-548	-6.07%	9,024
Fayette	3,331	62.47%	1,880	35.26%	15	0.28%	106	1.99%	1,451	27.21%	5,332
Franklin	27,439	61.49%	15,502	34.74%	774	1.73%	907	2.03%	11,937	26.75%	44,622
Fulton	3,593	69.12%	1,448	27.86%	30	0.58%	127	2.44%	2,145	41.27%	5,198
Gallia	3,880	67.51%	1,742	30.31%	16	0.28%	109	1.90%	2,138	37.20%	5,747
Geauga	2,762	81.24%	544	16.00%	20	0.59%	74	2.18%	2,218	65.24%	3,400
Greene	5,043	67.38%	2,004	26.78%	273	3.65%	164	2.19%	3,039	40.61%	7,484
Guernsey	5,427	62.89%	2,448	28.37%	212	2.46%	543	6.29%	2,979	34.52%	8,630
Hamilton	65,129	66.43%	24,936	25.44%	7,158	7.30%	815	0.83%	40,193	41.00%	98,038
Hancock	5,766	55.30%	4,148	39.79%	239	2.29%	273	2.62%	1,618	15.52%	10,426
Hardin	4,736	57.36%	3,096	37.50%	224	2.71%	200	2.42%	1,640	19.86%	8,256
Harrison	3,115	63.40%	1,578	32.12%	24	0.49%	196	3.99%	1,537	31.28%	4,913
Henry	2,707	45.85%	3,102	52.54%	9	0.15%	86	1.46%	-395	-6.69%	5,904
Highland	4,205	54.00%	3,321	42.65%	30	0.39%	231	2.97%	884	11.35%	7,787
Hocking	2,979	55.18%	2,304	42.67%	19	0.35%	97	1.80%	675	12.50%	5,399
Holmes	1,377	34.77%	2,486	62.78%	23	0.58%	74	1.87%	-1,109	-28.01%	3,960
Huron	5,613	66.11%	2,622	30.88%	120	1.41%	135	1.59%	2,991	35.23%	8,490
Jackson	5,353	69.12%	2,072	26.76%	84	1.08%	235	3.03%	3,281	42.37%	7,744
Jefferson	7,337	69.11%	2,600	24.49%	238	2.24%	442	4.16%	4,737	44.62%	10,617
Knox	4,235	56.17%	3,036	40.27%	123	1.63%	146	1.94%	1,199	15.90%	7,540
Lake	3,824	76.42%	871	17.41%	183	3.66%	126	2.52%	2,953	59.01%	5,004
Lawrence	5,587	72.42%	1,905	24.69%	106	1.37%	117	1.52%	3,682	47.73%	7,715
Licking	6,798	51.04%	6,019	45.19%	228	1.71%	275	2.06%	779	5.85%	13,320
Logan	4,994	69.21%	1,939	26.87%	74	1.03%	209	2.90%	3,055	42.34%	7,216
Lorain	9,001	70.16%	2,700	21.04%	925	7.21%	204	1.59%	6,301	49.11%	12,830
Lucas	22,924	67.33%	8,259	24.26%	2,455	7.21%	407	1.20%	14,665	43.08%	34,045
Madison	3,164	59.07%	2,103	39.26%	12	0.22%	77	1.44%	1,061	19.81%	5,356
Mahoning	10,404	59.97%	4,436	25.57%	2,072	11.94%	438	2.52%	5,968	34.40%	17,350
Marion	4,473	53.82%	3,581	43.09%	59	0.71%	198	2.38%	892	10.73%	8,311
Medina	3,632	67.85%	1,517	28.34%	94	1.76%	110	2.05%	2,115	39.51%	5,353
Meigs	4,304	68.45%	1,708	27.16%	131	2.08%	145	2.31%	2,596	41.28%	6,288
Mercer	2,173	38.70%	3,286	58.52%	18	0.32%	138	2.46%	-1,113	-19.82%	5,615
Miami	6,793	62.44%	3,646	33.51%	228	2.10%	212	1.95%	3,147	28.93%	10,879
Monroe	2,222	40.17%	3,169	57.30%	15	0.27%	125	2.26%	-947	-17.12%	5,531
Montgomery	22,144	58.70%	13,933	36.93%	1,168	3.10%	480	1.27%	8,211	21.77%	37,725
Morgan	2,572	58.79%	1,612	36.85%	15	0.34%	176	4.02%	960	21.94%	4,375
Morrow	2,563	55.18%	1,827	39.33%	32	0.69%	223	4.80%	736	15.84%	4,645
Muskingum	7,597	54.54%	5,511	39.57%	226	1.62%	594	4.26%	2,086	14.98%	13,928
Noble	2,700	58.90%	1,671	36.45%	24	0.52%	189	4.12%	1,029	22.45%	4,584
Ottawa	2,437	46.92%	2,706	52.10%	11	0.21%	40	0.77%	-269	-5.18%	5,194
Paulding	3,496	56.83%	2,505	40.72%	7	0.11%	144	2.34%	991	16.11%	6,152
Perry	4,883	60.32%	2,846	35.16%	164	2.03%	202	2.50%	2,037	25.16%	8,095
Pickaway	2,976	44.63%	3,492	52.37%	12	0.18%	188	2.82%	-516	-7.74%	6,668
Pike	1,818	45.69%	2,090	52.53%	14	0.35%	57	1.43%	-272	-6.84%	3,979
Portage	4,712	62.49%	2,486	32.97%	155	2.06%	188	2.49%	2,226	29.52%	7,541
Preble	3,647	54.85%	2,792	41.99%	20	0.30%	190	2.86%	855	12.86%	6,649
Putnam	2,853	39.48%	4,145	57.36%	84	1.16%	144	1.99%	-1,292	-17.88%	7,226
Richland	5,587	48.85%	5,407	47.27%	232	2.03%	212	1.85%	180	1.57%	11,438
Ross	5,472	54.60%	4,387	43.77%	54	0.54%	109	1.09%	1,085	10.83%	10,022
Sandusky	4,208	50.38%	3,787	45.34%	200	2.39%	158	1.89%	421	5.04%	8,353
Scioto	5,540	62.56%	2,420	27.33%	613	6.92%	282	3.18%	3,120	35.23%	8,855
Seneca	5,291	50.78%	4,757	45.65%	170	1.63%	202	1.94%	534	5.12%	10,420
Shelby	2,737	44.72%	3,286	53.69%	16	0.26%	81	1.32%	-549	-8.97%	6,120
Stark	15,695	65.46%	6,919	28.86%	663	2.77%	698	2.91%	8,776	36.60%	23,975
Summit	12,451	66.04%	4,618	24.49%	1,186	6.29%	600	3.18%	7,833	41.54%	18,855
Trumbull	7,383	68.37%	2,110	19.54%	962	8.91%	344	3.19%	5,273	48.83%	10,799
Tuscarawas	7,203	55.76%	4,979	38.55%	489	3.79%	246	1.90%	2,224	17.22%	12,917
Union	3,646	63.71%	1,924	33.62%	4	0.07%	149	2.60%	1,722	30.09%	5,723
Van Wert	4,120	54.08%	3,325	43.65%	52	0.68%	121	1.59%	795	10.44%	7,618
Vinton	1,994	59.68%	1,286	38.49%	8	0.24%	53	1.59%	708	21.19%	3,341
Warren	4,381	67.11%	2,012	30.82%	35	0.54%	100	1.53%	2,369	36.29%	6,528
Washington	6,522	57.55%	4,436	39.15%	75	0.66%	299	2.64%	2,086	18.41%	11,332
Wayne	4,748	50.80%	4,165	44.56%	73	0.78%	360	3.85%	583	6.24%	9,346
Williams	3,827	57.91%	2,565	38.82%	65	0.98%	151	2.29%	1,262	19.10%	6,608
Wood	7,025	61.50%	3,630	31.78%	141	1.23%	626	5.48%	3,395	29.72%	11,422
Wyandot	2,603	47.90%	2,697	49.63%	42	0.77%	92	1.69%	-94	-1.73%	5,434
Totals	600,095	59.75%	344,674	34.32%	36,260	3.61%	23,364	2.33%	255,421	25.43%	1,004,393

== See also ==
- United States presidential elections in Ohio
