= Dey Road Bridge =

- U.S. National Register of Historic Places
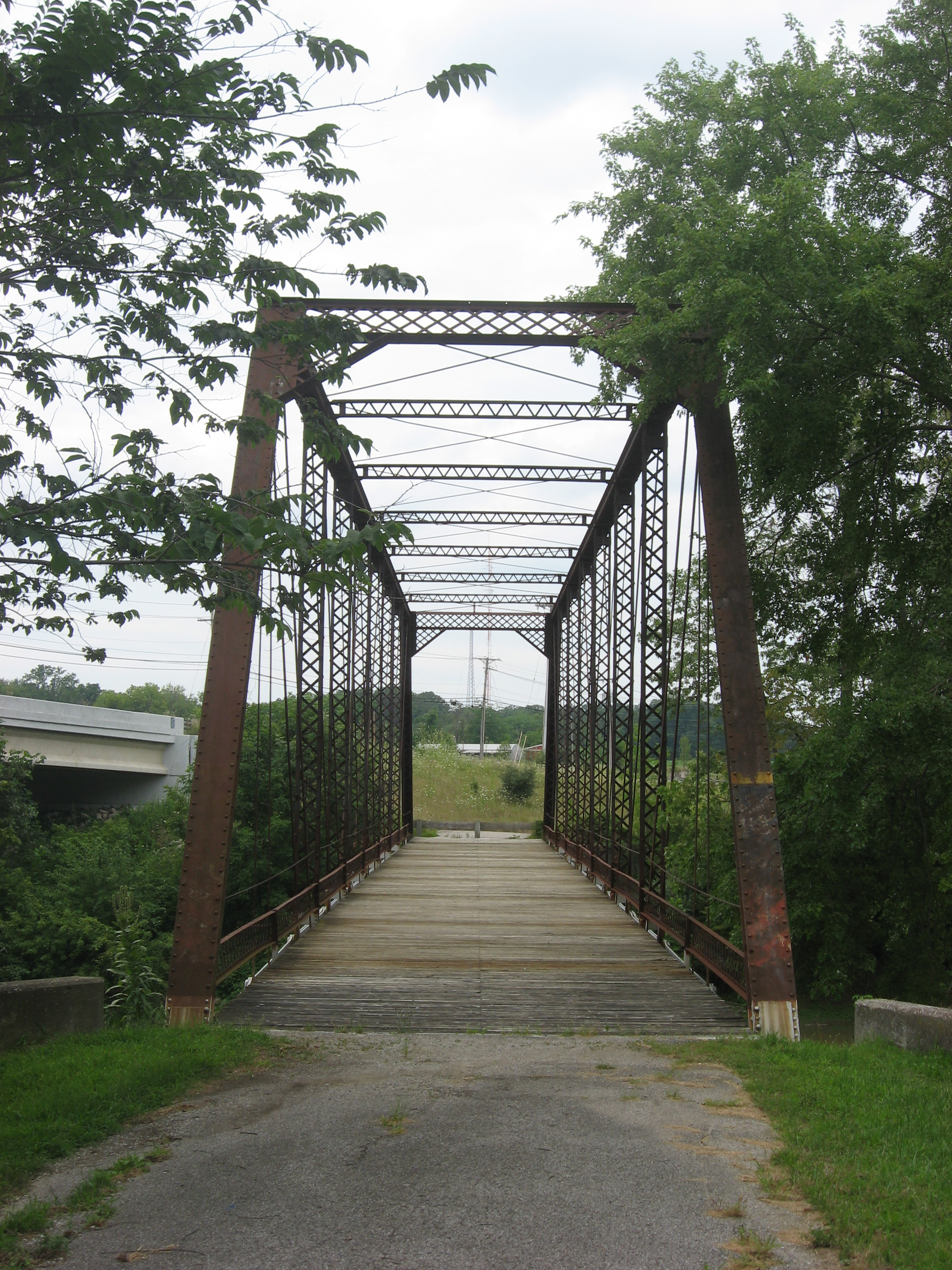
- Eastern end of the bridge. The current bridge is visible on the left edge of the image.

- Location within Ohio Location within the United States
- Location: 0.35 miles east of U.S. Route 24, west of Defiance, Ohio
- Coordinates: 41°17′25″N 84°23′8″W
- Area: Less than 1 acre (0.40 ha)
- Built: 1906
- Architect: Massillon Bridge Company
- Architectural style: Pratt through truss bridge
- NRHP reference No.: 99000095
- Added to NRHP: February 5, 1999

The Dey Road Bridge is a historic truss bridge that spans the Tiffin River near the city of Defiance, Ohio, United States. Built in the 1900s, it has been designated a historic site.

In 1835, an early toll bridge across the Tiffin was built at the nearby community of Brunersburg, but it was soon destroyed by a flood. The current bridge is a Pratt through truss bridge that was manufactured by the Massillon Bridge Company and built in 1906. Built on concrete supports, it is constructed primarily of iron. In 1907, it became a local landmark for surveying purposes when a USGS surveyor placed a benchmark on its northwestern abutment.

In 1999, the bridge was listed on the National Register of Historic Places, qualifying because of its historically significant engineering. By that time, the bridge was vacant and not in use. Now known as the "Old Dey Bridge", the bridge is closed to road traffic, although pedestrians are still permitted to use it. The bridge is one of several locations included as points of interest on a proposed Defiance city strategic plan.
