= Ridgeville Township, Henry County, Ohio =

Township in Ohio, US

- Township
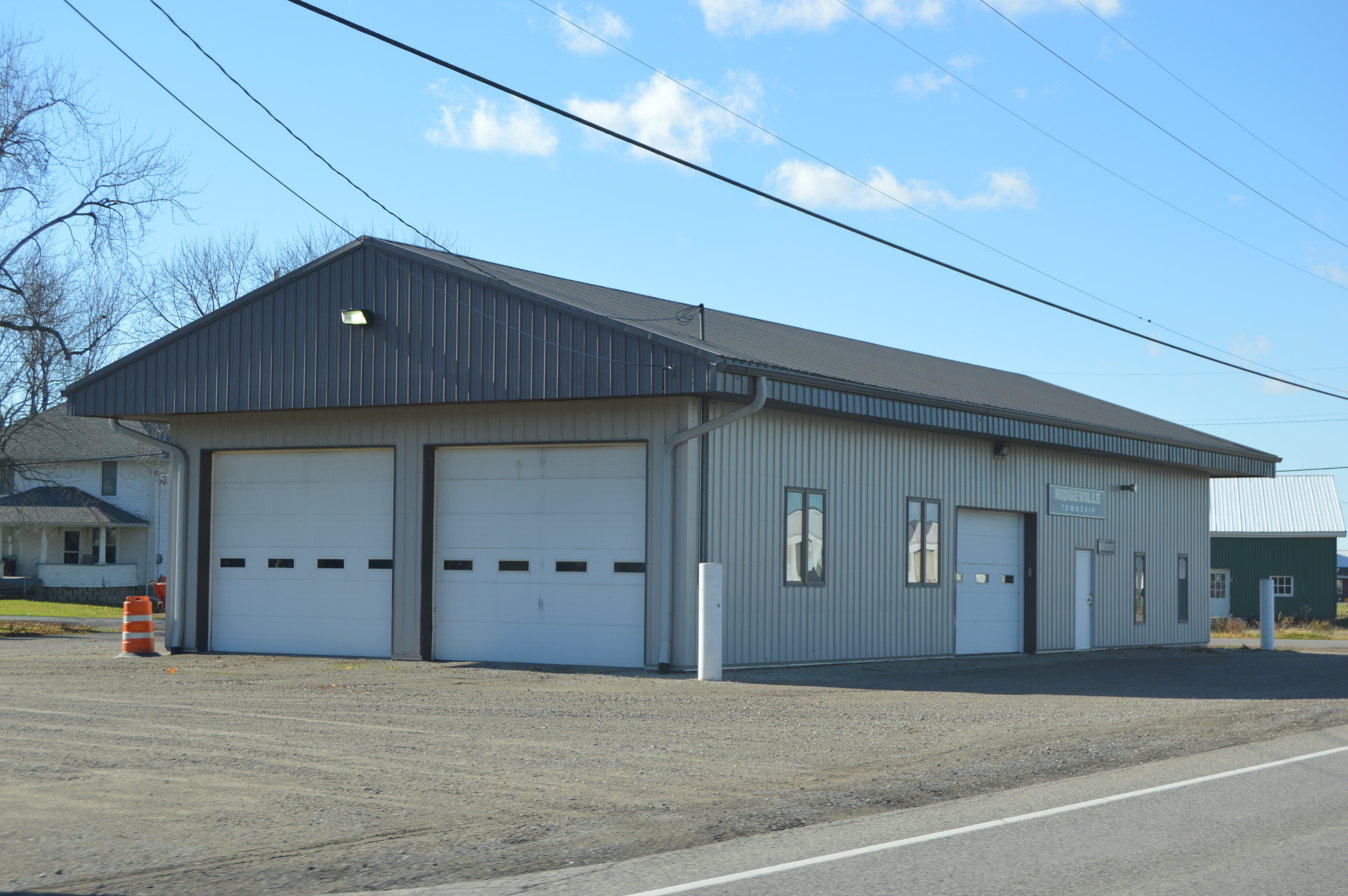
- Township hall at Ridgeville Corners

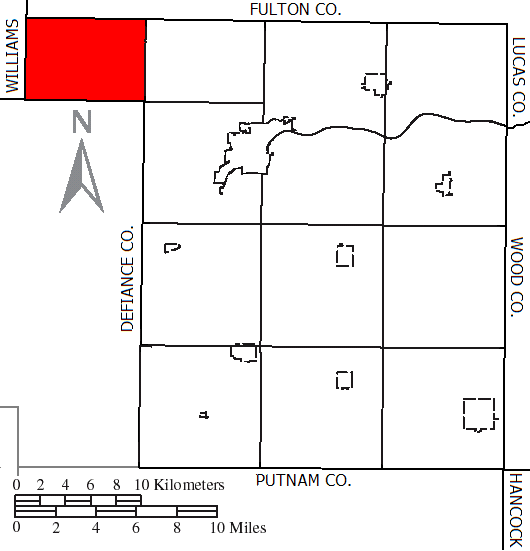
- Location of Ridgeville Township in Henry County
- Coordinates: 41°27′19″N 84°17′47″W
- Country: United States
- State: Ohio
- County: Henry

Area
  - Total: 23.6 sq mi (61.0 km^{2})
  - Land: 23.6 sq mi (61.0 km^{2})
  - Water: 0 sq mi (0.0 km^{2})
- Elevation: 735 ft (224 m)

Population (2020)
  - Total: 1,096
  - Density: 46.5/sq mi (18.0/km^{2})
- Time zone: UTC-5 (Eastern (EST))
  - Summer (DST): UTC-4 (EDT)
- FIPS code: 39-67062
- GNIS feature ID: 1086297

Ridgeville Township is one of the thirteen townships of Henry County, Ohio, United States. As of the 2020 census the population was 1,096.

== Geography ==
Located in the northwestern corner of the county, it borders the following townships:

- German Township, Fulton County - north
- Clinton Township, Fulton County - northeast corner
- Freedom Township - east
- Napoleon Township - southeast corner
- Adams Township, Defiance County - south
- Tiffin Township, Defiance County - southwest corner
- Springfield Township, Williams County - west

Ridgeville Township is the only exception to the county's rectangular shape. It is the only county township to border Williams County.

No municipalities are located in Ridgeville Township, although the census-designated place of Ridgeville Corners lies in the township's east.

== Name and history ==
It is the only Ridgeville Township statewide.

== Government ==
The township is governed by a three-member board of trustees, who are elected in November of odd-numbered years to a four-year term beginning on the following January 1. Two are elected in the year after the presidential election and one is elected in the year before it. There is also an elected township fiscal officer, who serves a four-year term beginning on April 1 of the year after the election, which is held in November of the year before the presidential election. Vacancies in the fiscal officership or on the board of trustees are filled by the remaining trustees.
