= Springfield Township, Williams County, Ohio =

Township in Ohio, US

- Township
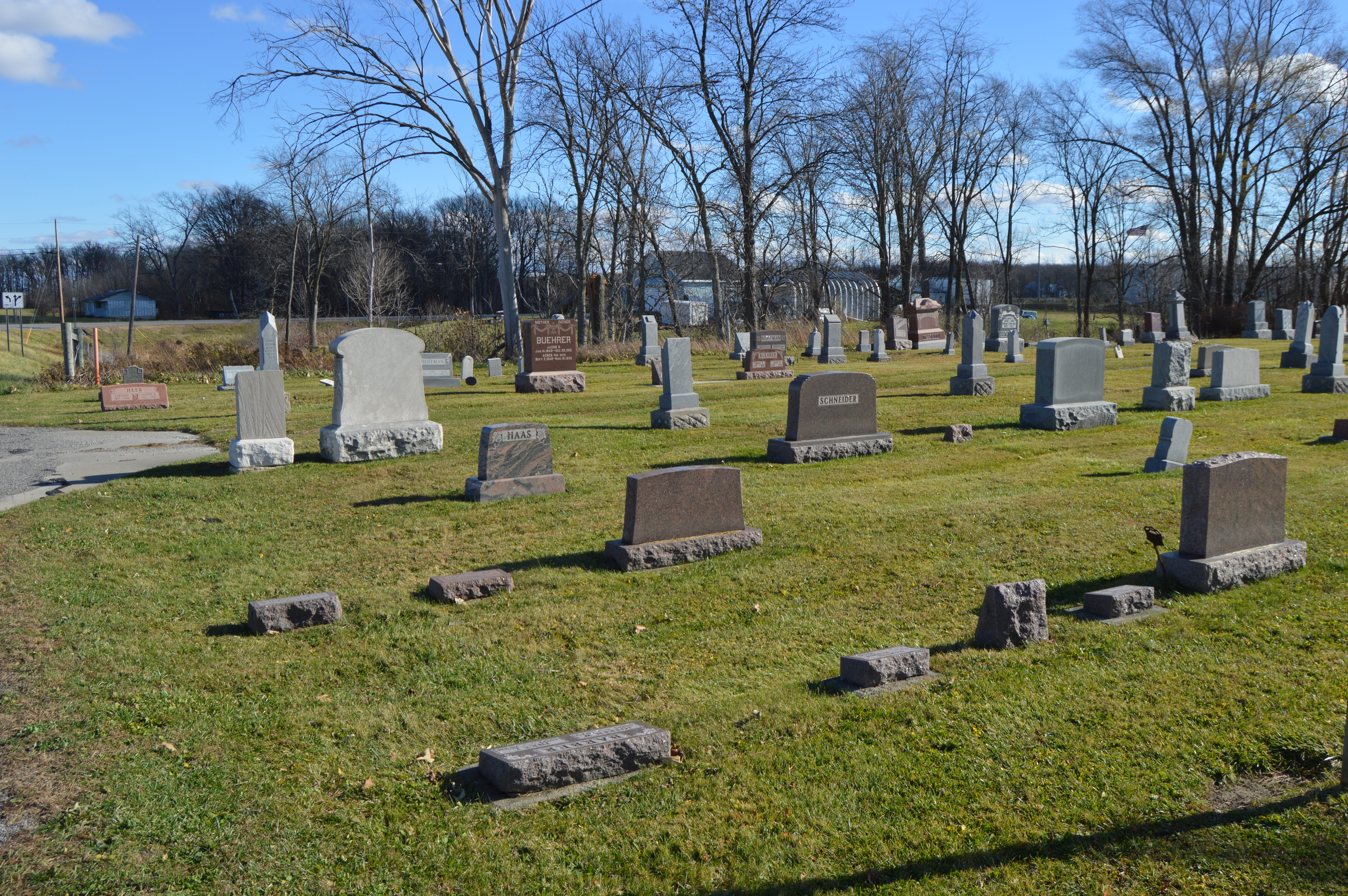
- Zion Cemetery, U.S. Route 6 southeast of Stryker

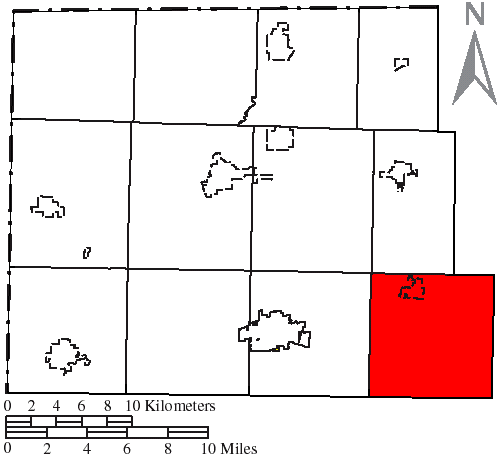
- Location of Springfield Township in Williams County
- Coordinates: 41°28′58″N 84°24′26″W
- Country: United States
- State: Ohio
- County: Williams

Area
  - Total: 36.3 sq mi (93.9 km^{2})
  - Land: 36.3 sq mi (93.9 km^{2})
  - Water: 0 sq mi (0.0 km^{2})
- Elevation: 719 ft (219 m)

Population (2020)
  - Total: 3,048
  - Density: 84.1/sq mi (32.5/km^{2})
- Time zone: UTC-5 (Eastern (EST))
  - Summer (DST): UTC-4 (EDT)
- FIPS code: 39-74131
- GNIS feature ID: 1087176

Springfield Township is one of the twelve townships of Williams County, Ohio, United States. The 2020 census found 3,048 people in the township.

== Geography ==
Located in the southeastern corner of the county, it borders the following townships:

- Brady Township - north
- German Township, Fulton County - northeast
- Ridgeville Township, Henry County - east
- Adams Township, Defiance County - southeast corner
- Tiffin Township, Defiance County - south
- Washington Township, Defiance County - southwest corner
- Pulaski Township - west
- Jefferson Township - northwest corner

The most easterly part of the county, Springfield Township is the only county township with a border on any part of Henry County.

The village of Stryker is located in northern Springfield Township.

== Name and history ==
Springfield Township was established in 1835. It is one of eleven Springfield Townships statewide.

== Government ==
The township is governed by a three-member board of trustees, who are elected in November of odd-numbered years to a four-year term beginning on the following January 1. Two are elected in the year after the presidential election and one is elected in the year before it. There is also an elected township fiscal officer, who serves a four-year term beginning on April 1 of the year after the election, which is held in November of the year before the presidential election. Vacancies in the fiscal officership or on the board of trustees are filled by the remaining trustees.
