= 1876 United States presidential election in Ohio =

- November 7, 1876
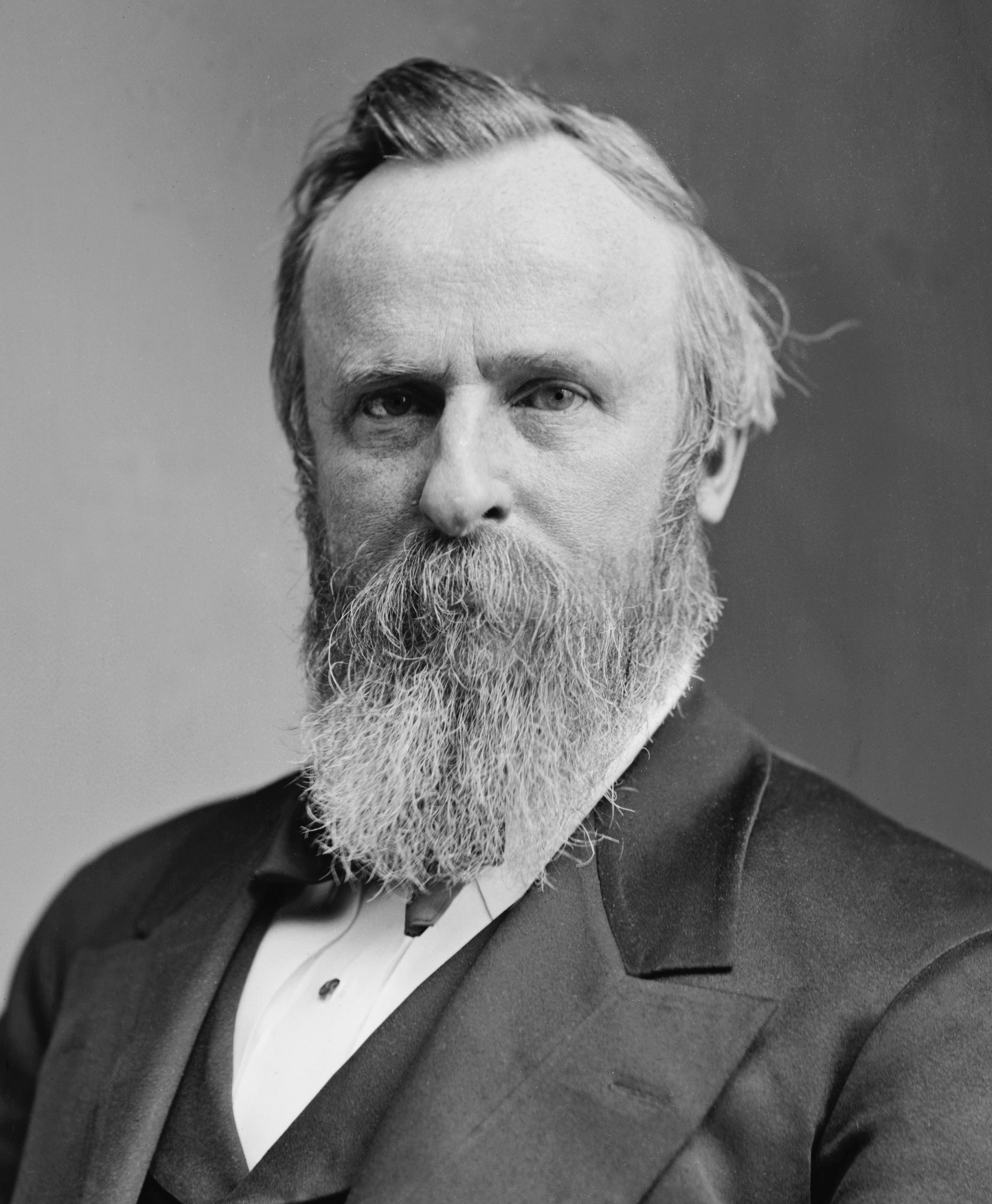

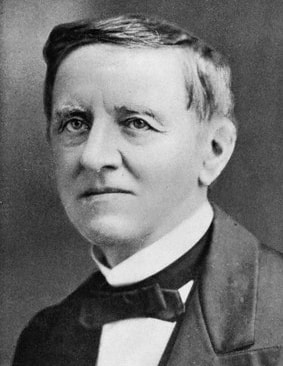
Nominee	Rutherford B. Hayes	Samuel J. Tilden
Party	Republican	Democratic
Home state	Ohio	New York
Running mate	William A. Wheeler	Thomas A. Hendricks
Electoral vote	22	0
Popular vote	330,698	323,182
Percentage	50.21%	49.07%
County results
Hayes
40–50%
50–60%
60–70%
70–80%
Tilden
50–60%
60–70%
70–80%
President before election
Ulysses S. Grant
Republican
Elected President
Rutherford B. Hayes
Republican

The 1876 United States presidential election in Ohio was held on November 7, 1876, as part of the 1876 United States presidential election. State voters chose 22 electors to the Electoral College, who voted for president and vice president.

Ohio was narrowly won by the Republican Party candidate and native son, Rutherford B. Hayes, with 50.21% of the popular vote. The Democratic Party candidate, Samuel J. Tilden, garnered 49.07% of the popular vote. This marks the weakest performance in Ohio for any victorious Republican candidate, seeing as no Republican has won the White House without carrying Ohio. Had Tilden won the state, he would have won the election.

== Results ==
1876 United States presidential election in Ohio
Party	Candidate	Votes	Percentage	Electoral votes
Republican	Rutherford B. Hayes	330,698	50.21%	22
Democratic	Samuel J. Tilden	323,182	49.07%	0
Greenback	Peter Cooper	3,057	0.46%	0
Prohibition	Green Smith	1,636	0.25%	0
American National Party	James Walker	76	0.01%	0
Totals		658,649	100.0%	22

=== Results by county ===
County	Rutherford B. Hayes Republican		Samuel J. Tilden Democratic		Various candidates Other parties		Margin		Total votes cast
County	#	%	#	%	#	%	#	%	#
Adams	2,141	45.47%	2,546	54.07%	22	0.47%	-405	-8.60%	4,709
Allen	2,481	41.23%	3,518	58.47%	18	0.30%	-1,037	-17.23%	6,017
Ashland	2,387	44.09%	3,021	55.80%	6	0.11%	-634	-11.71%	5,414
Ashtabula	6,771	74.31%	2,294	25.18%	47	0.52%	4,477	49.13%	9,112
Athens	3,413	60.19%	2,195	38.71%	62	1.09%	1,218	21.48%	5,670
Auglaize	1,521	29.90%	3,560	69.98%	6	0.12%	-2,039	-40.08%	5,087
Belmont	4,976	49.56%	5,024	50.03%	41	0.41%	-48	-0.48%	10,041
Brown	2,956	41.96%	4,068	57.74%	21	0.30%	-1,112	-15.78%	7,045
Butler	3,351	35.68%	6,029	64.20%	11	0.12%	-2,678	-28.52%	9,391
Carroll	2,060	56.94%	1,554	42.95%	4	0.11%	506	13.99%	3,618
Champaign	3,528	54.99%	2,872	44.76%	16	0.25%	656	10.22%	6,416
Clark	5,136	58.86%	3,542	40.59%	48	0.55%	1,594	18.27%	8,726
Clermont	3,848	47.06%	4,315	52.77%	14	0.17%	-467	-5.71%	8,177
Clinton	3,500	62.30%	2,048	36.45%	70	1.25%	1,452	25.85%	5,618
Columbiana	5,417	55.87%	4,000	41.25%	279	2.88%	1,417	14.61%	9,696
Coshocton	2,518	43.16%	3,312	56.77%	4	0.07%	-794	-13.61%	5,834
Crawford	2,312	34.54%	4,365	65.22%	16	0.24%	-2,053	-30.67%	6,693
Cuyahoga	18,198	55.21%	14,425	43.76%	340	1.03%	3,773	11.45%	32,963
Darke	3,577	43.38%	4,667	56.60%	1	0.01%	-1,090	-13.22%	8,245
Defiance	1,520	34.43%	2,888	65.41%	7	0.16%	-1,368	-30.99%	4,415
Delaware	3,237	52.25%	2,809	45.34%	149	2.41%	428	6.91%	6,195
Erie	3,158	49.40%	3,112	48.68%	123	1.92%	46	0.72%	6,393
Fairfield	2,770	37.57%	4,597	62.36%	5	0.07%	-1,827	-24.78%	7,372
Fayette	2,436	55.59%	1,874	42.77%	72	1.64%	562	12.83%	4,382
Franklin	7,557	44.36%	9,383	55.07%	97	0.57%	-1,826	-10.72%	17,037
Fulton	2,697	61.99%	1,597	36.70%	57	1.31%	1,100	25.28%	4,351
Gallia	3,202	58.07%	2,302	41.75%	10	0.18%	900	16.32%	5,514
Geauga	3,004	78.62%	808	21.15%	9	0.24%	2,196	57.47%	3,821
Greene	4,488	63.67%	2,494	35.38%	67	0.95%	1,994	28.29%	7,049
Guernsey	3,106	55.60%	2,460	44.04%	20	0.36%	646	11.56%	5,586
Hamilton	28,869	49.46%	29,451	50.46%	43	0.07%	-582	-1.00%	58,363
Hancock	2,811	46.59%	3,215	53.28%	8	0.13%	-404	-6.70%	6,034
Hardin	2,830	50.98%	2,702	48.68%	19	0.34%	128	2.31%	5,551
Harrison	2,564	55.55%	2,020	43.76%	32	0.69%	544	11.79%	4,616
Henry	1,527	38.36%	2,445	61.42%	9	0.23%	-918	-23.06%	3,981
Highland	3,341	50.06%	3,323	49.79%	10	0.15%	18	0.27%	6,674
Hocking	1,475	39.47%	2,259	60.45%	3	0.08%	-784	-20.98%	3,737
Holmes	1,241	28.12%	3,171	71.84%	2	0.05%	-1,930	-43.72%	4,414
Huron	4,504	59.37%	3,014	39.73%	68	0.90%	1,490	19.64%	7,586
Jackson	2,522	56.24%	1,954	43.58%	8	0.18%	568	12.67%	4,484
Jefferson	4,067	57.87%	2,922	41.58%	39	0.55%	1,145	16.29%	7,028
Knox	3,151	48.15%	3,301	50.44%	92	1.41%	-150	-2.29%	6,544
Lake	2,941	71.28%	1,141	27.65%	44	1.07%	1,800	43.63%	4,126
Lawrence	3,975	57.15%	2,949	42.40%	31	0.45%	1,026	14.75%	6,955
Licking	3,962	41.84%	5,473	57.79%	35	0.37%	-1,511	-15.96%	9,470
Logan	3,259	57.98%	2,286	40.67%	76	1.35%	973	17.31%	5,621
Lorain	5,187	65.28%	2,720	34.23%	39	0.49%	2,467	31.05%	7,946
Lucas	6,524	54.55%	5,155	43.10%	281	2.35%	1,369	11.45%	11,960
Madison	2,191	50.24%	2,145	49.19%	25	0.57%	46	1.05%	4,361
Mahoning	3,921	48.47%	3,691	45.62%	478	5.91%	230	2.84%	8,090
Marion	1,918	42.23%	2,603	57.31%	21	0.46%	-685	-15.08%	4,542
Medina	3,119	58.39%	2,192	41.03%	31	0.58%	927	17.35%	5,342
Meigs	3,962	58.67%	2,773	41.06%	18	0.27%	1,189	17.61%	6,753
Mercer	1,128	28.39%	2,840	71.48%	5	0.13%	-1,712	-43.09%	3,973
Miami	4,388	55.40%	3,509	44.31%	23	0.29%	879	11.10%	7,920
Monroe	1,462	27.72%	3,805	72.15%	7	0.13%	-2,343	-44.43%	5,274
Montgomery	7,921	46.82%	8,971	53.02%	27	0.16%	-1,050	-6.21%	16,919
Morgan	2,376	51.75%	2,108	45.92%	107	2.33%	268	5.84%	4,591
Morrow	2,450	53.47%	2,046	44.65%	86	1.88%	404	8.82%	4,582
Muskingum	5,232	48.66%	5,457	50.75%	63	0.59%	-225	-2.09%	10,752
Noble	2,225	50.86%	2,096	47.91%	54	1.23%	129	2.95%	4,375
Ottawa	1,336	37.70%	2,208	62.30%	0	0.00%	-872	-24.60%	3,544
Paulding	1,313	52.67%	1,180	47.33%	0	0.00%	133	5.33%	2,493
Perry	2,084	40.22%	2,810	54.24%	287	5.54%	-726	-14.01%	5,181
Pickaway	2,565	43.03%	3,389	56.85%	7	0.12%	-824	-13.82%	5,961
Pike	1,465	41.14%	2,096	58.86%	0	0.00%	-631	-17.72%	3,561
Portage	3,712	54.92%	3,006	44.47%	41	0.61%	706	10.45%	6,759
Preble	3,004	53.46%	2,551	45.40%	64	1.14%	453	8.06%	5,619
Putnam	1,606	33.56%	3,174	66.33%	5	0.10%	-1,568	-32.77%	4,785
Richland	3,649	45.19%	4,407	54.58%	18	0.22%	-758	-9.39%	8,074
Ross	4,177	48.42%	4,431	51.36%	19	0.22%	-254	-2.94%	8,627
Sandusky	3,032	47.31%	3,330	51.96%	47	0.73%	-298	-4.65%	6,409
Scioto	3,359	52.55%	3,025	47.32%	8	0.13%	334	5.23%	6,392
Seneca	3,793	45.57%	4,515	54.25%	15	0.18%	-722	-8.67%	8,323
Shelby	1,985	38.72%	3,141	61.28%	0	0.00%	-1,156	-22.55%	5,126
Stark	6,410	48.16%	6,772	50.88%	127	0.95%	-362	-2.72%	13,309
Summit	5,055	56.59%	3,804	42.59%	73	0.82%	1,251	14.01%	8,932
Trumbull	6,133	63.77%	3,030	31.51%	454	4.72%	3,103	32.27%	9,617
Tuscarawas	3,574	43.95%	4,545	55.89%	13	0.16%	-971	-11.94%	8,132
Union	2,939	58.37%	2,072	41.15%	24	0.48%	867	17.22%	5,035
Van Wert	2,290	48.72%	2,410	51.28%	0	0.00%	-120	-2.55%	4,700
Vinton	1,533	45.58%	1,817	54.03%	13	0.39%	-284	-8.44%	3,363
Warren	4,146	61.79%	2,559	38.14%	5	0.07%	1,587	23.65%	6,710
Washington	4,361	49.09%	4,492	50.56%	31	0.35%	-131	-1.47%	8,884
Wayne	4,009	46.40%	4,598	53.21%	34	0.39%	-589	-6.82%	8,641
Williams	2,701	51.39%	2,546	48.44%	9	0.17%	155	2.95%	5,256
Wood	4,079	55.59%	3,245	44.23%	13	0.18%	834	11.37%	7,337
Wyandot	2,079	44.22%	2,619	55.71%	3	0.06%	-540	-11.49%	4,701
Totals	330,698	50.21%	323,182	49.07%	4,769	1.72%	7,516	1.14%	658,649

== See also ==
- United States presidential elections in Ohio
