= 1920 United States presidential election in Ohio =

- November 2, 1920
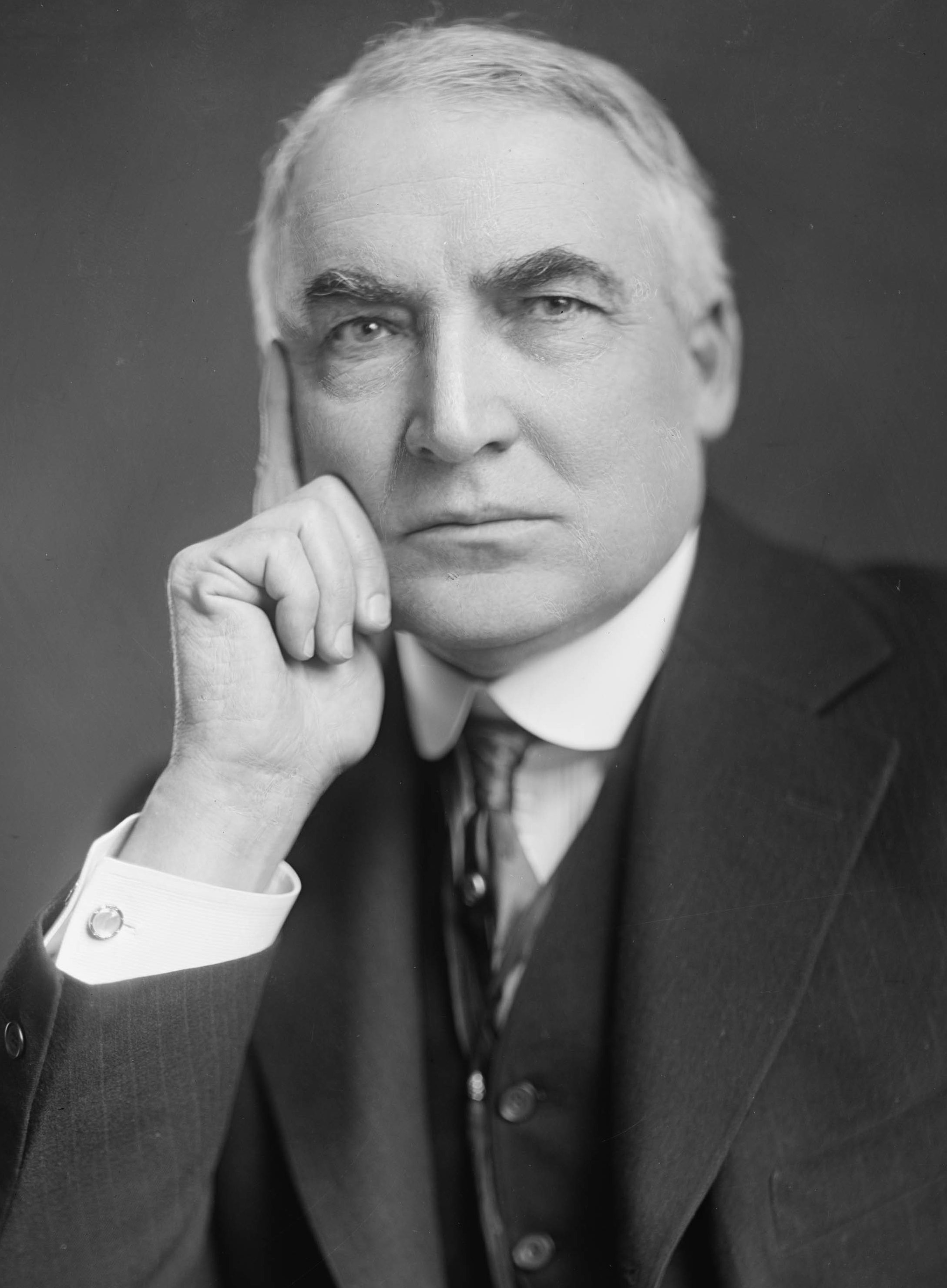

Nominee	Warren G. Harding	James M. Cox
Party	Republican	Democratic
Home state	Ohio	Ohio
Running mate	Calvin Coolidge	Franklin D. Roosevelt
Electoral vote	24	0
Popular vote	1,182,022	780,037
Percentage	58.47%	38.58%
County results
Harding
50–60%
60–70%
70–80%
Cox
40–50%
50–60%
60–70%
President before election
Woodrow Wilson
Democratic
Elected President
Warren G. Harding
Republican

The 1920 United States presidential election in Ohio was held on November 2, 1920, as part of the 1920 United States presidential election. State voters chose 24 electors to the Electoral College, who voted for president and vice president.

Both major-party presidential nominees were from Ohio and each held a statewide elected office there at the time of the presidential election. The Republican candidate, U.S. Senator Warren G. Harding, defeated the Democratic candidate, Governor James M. Cox, in the popular vote handily, 58.47–38.58%. Despite the magnitude of Harding's victory in the state, Ohio voted more than 6% more Democratic than the national average.

== Results ==
1920 United States presidential election in Ohio
Party	Candidate	Votes	Percentage	Electoral votes
Republican	Warren G. Harding	1,182,022	58.47%	24
Democratic	James M. Cox	780,037	38.58%	0
Socialist	Eugene Debs	57,147	2.83%	0
Single Tax Democrat	Robert Macauley	2,153	0.11%	0
Write-ins	Scattered	294	0.01%	0
Totals		2,021,653	100.0%	24

=== Results by county ===
County	Warren G. Harding Republican		James M. Cox Democratic		Eugene V. Debs Socialist		Robert Macauley Single Tax		Various candidates Write-ins		Margin		Total votes cast
County	#	%	#	%	#	%	#	%	#	%	#	%	Total votes cast
Adams	4,974	54.07%	4,194	45.59%	30	0.33%	1	0.01%			780	8.48%	9,199
Allen	13,978	53.59%	11,658	44.70%	429	1.64%	17	0.07%			2,320	8.90%	26,082
Ashland	5,951	50.62%	5,705	48.52%	99	0.84%	2	0.02%			246	2.09%	11,757
Ashtabula	14,099	69.70%	5,413	26.76%	684	3.38%	33	0.16%			8,686	42.94%	20,229
Athens	11,016	61.54%	6,523	36.44%	353	1.97%	8	0.04%			4,493	25.10%	17,900
Auglaize	6,752	57.45%	4,792	40.78%	207	1.76%	1	0.01%			1,960	16.68%	11,752
Belmont	14,761	50.55%	13,347	45.71%	1,079	3.70%	14	0.05%			1,414	4.84%	29,201
Brown	4,009	42.79%	5,317	56.74%	41	0.44%	3	0.03%			-1,308	-13.96%	9,370
Butler	14,998	44.91%	16,437	49.22%	1,924	5.76%	37	0.11%			-1,439	-4.31%	33,396
Carroll	4,392	70.18%	1,755	28.04%	102	1.63%	9	0.14%			2,637	42.14%	6,258
Champaign	7,285	60.07%	4,775	39.37%	68	0.56%	0	0.00%			2,510	20.70%	12,128
Clark	19,869	57.52%	14,097	40.81%	561	1.62%	13	0.04%			5,772	16.71%	34,540
Clermont	6,857	51.91%	6,245	47.27%	104	0.79%	4	0.03%			612	4.63%	13,210
Clinton	6,947	65.61%	3,598	33.98%	36	0.34%	7	0.07%			3,349	31.63%	10,588
Columbiana	16,846	60.11%	9,774	34.88%	1,128	4.03%	26	0.09%	249	0.89%	7,072	25.24%	28,023
Coshocton	6,154	51.07%	5,617	46.61%	268	2.22%	12	0.10%			537	4.46%	12,051
Crawford	7,082	44.74%	8,467	53.49%	269	1.70%	11	0.07%			-1,385	-8.75%	15,829
Cuyahoga	148,857	64.36%	70,518	30.49%	11,018	4.76%	886	0.38%			78,339	33.87%	231,279
Darke	9,552	52.59%	8,459	46.58%	126	0.69%	15	0.08%	10	0.06%	1,093	6.02%	18,162
Defiance	5,987	60.54%	3,723	37.64%	176	1.78%	4	0.04%			2,264	22.89%	9,890
Delaware	7,700	59.21%	5,241	40.30%	36	0.28%	1	0.01%	26	0.20%	2,459	18.91%	13,004
Erie	8,755	62.36%	4,831	34.41%	442	3.15%	11	0.08%			3,924	27.95%	14,039
Fairfield	7,572	46.46%	8,610	52.83%	107	0.66%	9	0.06%			-1,038	-6.37%	16,298
Fayette	5,446	58.55%	3,812	40.98%	40	0.43%	3	0.03%			1,634	17.57%	9,301
Franklin	59,691	54.23%	48,452	44.02%	1,835	1.67%	86	0.08%			11,239	10.21%	110,064
Fulton	6,111	73.88%	2,049	24.77%	108	1.31%	3	0.04%			4,062	49.11%	8,271
Gallia	5,388	67.40%	2,562	32.05%	42	0.53%	2	0.03%			2,826	35.35%	7,994
Geauga	3,722	76.69%	1,081	22.27%	43	0.89%	2	0.04%	5	0.10%	2,641	54.42%	4,853
Greene	8,600	67.25%	4,016	31.40%	166	1.30%	6	0.05%			4,584	35.85%	12,788
Guernsey	8,764	54.36%	6,888	42.72%	463	2.87%	7	0.04%			1,876	11.64%	16,122
Hamilton	112,590	57.16%	77,598	39.40%	6,611	3.36%	167	0.08%			34,992	17.77%	196,966
Hancock	9,746	59.46%	6,386	38.96%	249	1.52%	9	0.05%			3,360	20.50%	16,390
Hardin	8,071	57.64%	5,817	41.54%	110	0.79%	5	0.04%			2,254	16.10%	14,003
Harrison	5,053	66.63%	2,473	32.61%	52	0.69%	6	0.08%			2,580	34.02%	7,584
Henry	5,738	66.10%	2,829	32.59%	113	1.30%	1	0.01%			2,909	33.51%	8,681
Highland	7,570	57.06%	5,654	42.62%	37	0.28%	6	0.05%			1,916	14.44%	13,267
Hocking	4,335	50.84%	4,082	47.87%	109	1.28%	1	0.01%			253	2.97%	8,527
Holmes	2,065	38.78%	3,211	60.30%	47	0.88%	2	0.04%			-1,146	-21.52%	5,325
Huron	9,348	67.18%	4,398	31.61%	154	1.11%	15	0.11%			4,950	35.57%	13,915
Jackson	5,949	54.43%	4,878	44.63%	98	0.90%	4	0.04%			1,071	9.80%	10,929
Jefferson	13,038	59.76%	8,064	36.96%	705	3.23%	9	0.04%			4,974	22.80%	21,816
Knox	8,178	55.98%	6,361	43.54%	68	0.47%	3	0.02%			1,817	12.44%	14,610
Lake	7,465	72.31%	2,711	26.26%	141	1.37%	6	0.06%			4,754	46.05%	10,323
Lawrence	7,616	65.08%	3,955	33.80%	128	1.09%	3	0.03%			3,661	31.29%	11,702
Licking	11,924	51.89%	10,679	46.47%	361	1.57%	13	0.06%	4	0.02%	1,245	5.42%	22,981
Logan	8,521	63.21%	4,904	36.38%	54	0.40%	2	0.01%			3,617	26.83%	13,481
Lorain	18,125	65.84%	8,640	31.39%	716	2.60%	48	0.17%			9,485	34.45%	27,529
Lucas	52,449	59.08%	30,452	34.30%	5,782	6.51%	86	0.10%			21,997	24.78%	88,769
Madison	5,397	58.76%	3,769	41.03%	17	0.19%	2	0.02%			1,628	17.72%	9,185
Mahoning	29,736	63.85%	14,941	32.08%	1,811	3.89%	82	0.18%			14,795	31.77%	46,570
Marion	11,320	57.93%	8,065	41.27%	144	0.74%	12	0.06%			3,255	16.66%	19,541
Medina	6,846	67.63%	3,120	30.82%	131	1.29%	25	0.25%			3,726	36.81%	10,122
Meigs	6,541	63.36%	3,606	34.93%	174	1.69%	3	0.03%			2,935	28.43%	10,324
Mercer	5,692	56.13%	4,404	43.43%	42	0.41%	2	0.02%			1,288	12.70%	10,140
Miami	13,122	60.28%	8,076	37.10%	557	2.56%	15	0.07%			5,046	23.18%	21,770
Monroe	2,825	41.94%	3,861	57.32%	46	0.68%	4	0.06%			-1,036	-15.38%	6,736
Montgomery	46,493	51.67%	38,433	42.72%	4,977	5.53%	72	0.08%			8,060	8.96%	89,975
Morgan	4,127	64.26%	2,157	33.59%	134	2.09%	4	0.06%			1,970	30.68%	6,422
Morrow	4,484	60.78%	2,858	38.74%	34	0.46%	2	0.03%			1,626	22.04%	7,378
Muskingum	13,862	58.56%	9,437	39.87%	357	1.51%	15	0.06%			4,425	18.69%	23,671
Noble	4,197	59.06%	2,909	40.94%	0	0.00%	0	0.00%			1,288	18.13%	7,106
Ottawa	4,336	59.41%	2,867	39.28%	88	1.21%	8	0.11%			1,469	20.13%	7,299
Paulding	4,549	61.76%	2,739	37.18%	76	1.03%	2	0.03%			1,810	24.57%	7,366
Perry	7,685	54.82%	5,917	42.21%	411	2.93%	5	0.04%			1,768	12.61%	14,018
Pickaway	5,273	48.20%	5,645	51.60%	19	0.17%	2	0.02%			-372	-3.40%	10,939
Pike	3,075	52.08%	2,799	47.41%	30	0.51%	0	0.00%			276	4.67%	5,904
Portage	8,231	58.99%	5,405	38.74%	301	2.16%	16	0.11%			2,826	20.25%	13,953
Preble	6,258	55.72%	4,933	43.92%	36	0.32%	4	0.04%			1,325	11.80%	11,231
Putnam	5,157	52.10%	4,673	47.21%	64	0.65%	5	0.05%			484	4.89%	9,899
Richland	10,940	52.78%	9,349	45.11%	417	2.01%	21	0.10%			1,591	7.68%	20,727
Ross	9,330	56.46%	7,063	42.74%	128	0.77%	5	0.03%			2,267	13.72%	16,526
Sandusky	8,933	61.77%	5,295	36.62%	230	1.59%	3	0.02%			3,638	25.16%	14,461
Scioto	11,871	58.96%	7,682	38.15%	574	2.85%	8	0.04%			4,189	20.80%	20,135
Seneca	10,064	54.40%	8,175	44.19%	243	1.31%	18	0.10%			1,889	10.21%	18,500
Shelby	5,452	48.78%	5,642	50.48%	80	0.72%	2	0.02%			-190	-1.70%	11,176
Stark	37,483	62.88%	18,437	30.93%	3,629	6.09%	59	0.10%			19,046	31.95%	59,608
Summit	43,721	59.60%	27,857	37.97%	1,736	2.37%	49	0.07%			15,864	21.62%	73,363
Trumbull	17,343	68.66%	6,815	26.98%	1,073	4.25%	28	0.11%			10,528	41.68%	25,259
Tuscarawas	11,908	51.96%	10,167	44.36%	831	3.63%	13	0.06%			1,741	7.60%	22,919
Union	6,544	66.34%	3,286	33.31%	34	0.34%	1	0.01%			3,258	33.03%	9,865
Van Wert	7,495	59.99%	4,899	39.21%	93	0.74%	6	0.05%			2,596	20.78%	12,493
Vinton	2,559	54.06%	2,124	44.87%	49	1.04%	2	0.04%			435	9.19%	4,734
Warren	7,464	64.96%	3,956	34.43%	68	0.59%	3	0.03%			3,508	30.53%	11,491
Washington	9,279	58.20%	6,286	39.43%	373	2.34%	6	0.04%			2,993	18.77%	15,944
Wayne	8,932	52.88%	7,751	45.89%	193	1.14%	14	0.08%			1,181	6.99%	16,890
Williams	7,000	61.75%	4,183	36.90%	149	1.31%	4	0.04%			2,817	24.85%	11,336
Wood	12,042	69.72%	4,965	28.75%	260	1.51%	5	0.03%			7,077	40.97%	17,272
Wyandot	4,560	50.50%	4,443	49.21%	19	0.21%	7	0.08%			117	1.30%	9,029
Totals	1,182,022	58.47%	780,037	38.58%	57,147	2.83%	2,153	0.11%	294	0.01%	401,985	19.88%	2,021,653

== See also ==
- United States presidential elections in Ohio
