= Brunersburg, Ohio =

Unincorporated community in Ohio, U.S.

Coordinates: 41°18′27″N 84°23′31″W

Brunersburg is a census-designated place in Defiance County, Ohio.

As of the 2020 census, Brunersburg had a population of 314.

== History ==
Brunersburg was platted in 1834 by Daniel Bruner, and named for him. A post office was established at Brunersburg in 1837, and remained in operation until 1895.
