= Adams Township, Defiance County, Ohio =

Township in Ohio, US

- Township
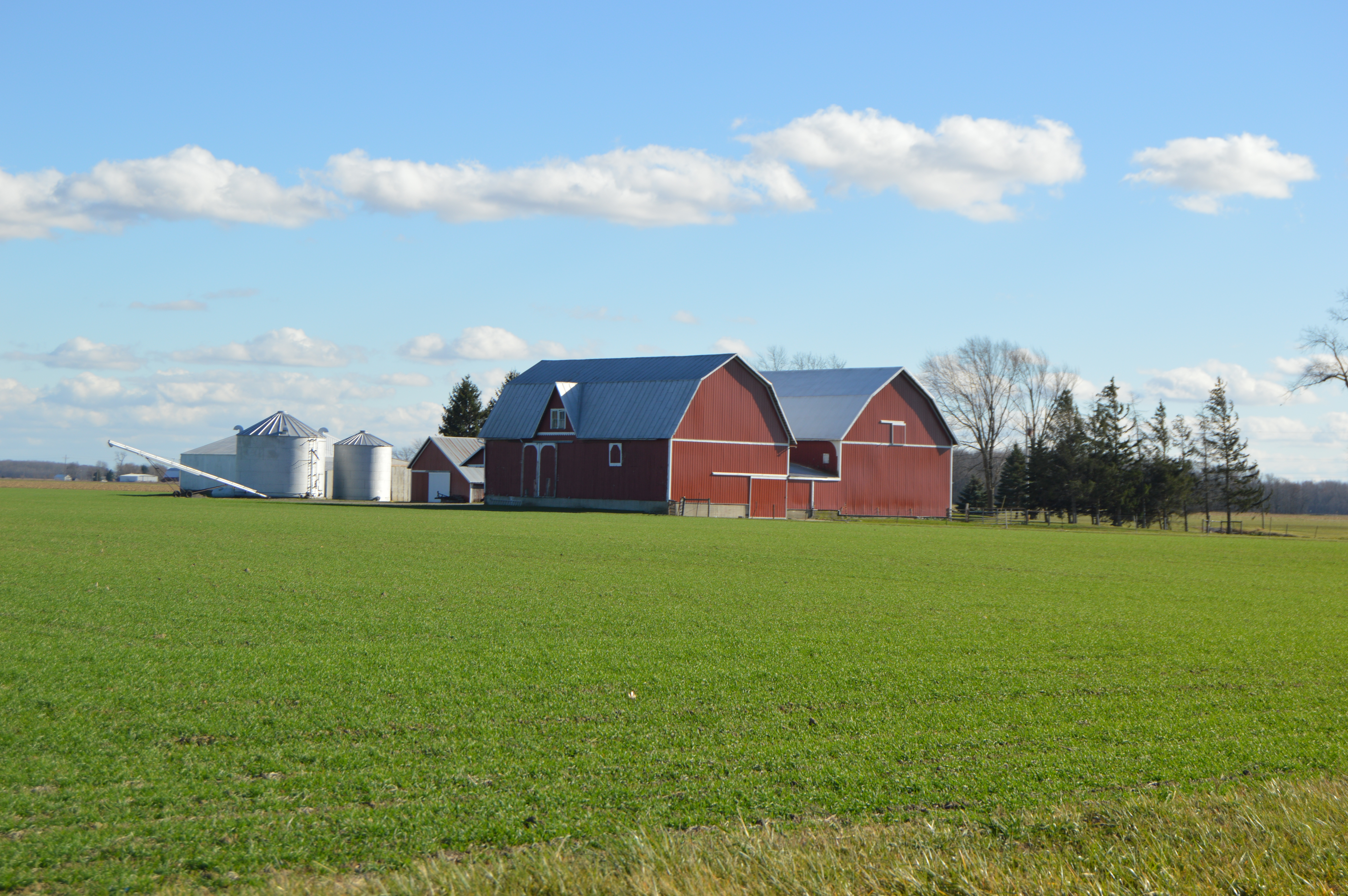
- Wheat farm in the township's northeast

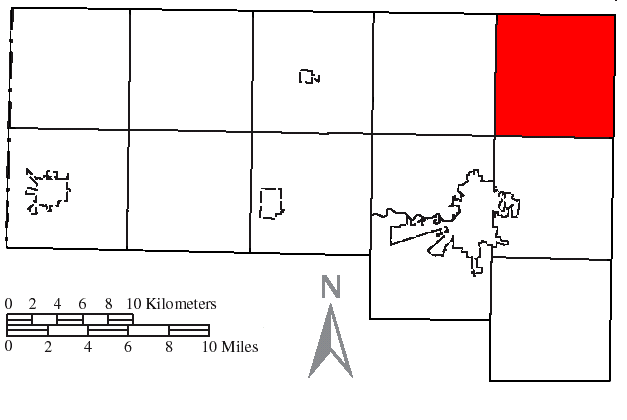
- Location of Adams Township in Defiance County
- Coordinates: 41°22′50″N 84°17′10″W
- Country: United States
- State: Ohio
- County: Defiance

Area
  - Total: 35.6 sq mi (92.2 km^{2})
  - Land: 35.6 sq mi (92.2 km^{2})
  - Water: 0 sq mi (0.0 km^{2})
- Elevation: 735 ft (224 m)

Population (2020)
  - Total: 884
  - Density: 24.8/sq mi (9.59/km^{2})
- Time zone: UTC-5 (Eastern (EST))
  - Summer (DST): UTC-4 (EDT)
- FIPS code: 39-00268
- GNIS feature ID: 1086029

Adams Township is one of the twelve townships of Defiance County, Ohio, United States. The 2020 census found 884 people in the township.

== Geography ==
Located in the northeastern corner of the county, it borders the following townships:

- Ridgeville Township, Henry County - north
- Freedom Township, Henry County - northeast corner
- Napoleon Township, Henry County - east
- Flatrock Township, Henry County - southeast corner
- Richland Township - south
- Noble Township - southwest corner
- Tiffin Township - west
- Springfield Township, Williams County - northwest corner

No municipalities are located in Adams Township.

== Name and history ==
Adams Township was organized in 1836, and named for Judge Bishop Adams, a pioneer settler. It is one of ten Adams Townships statewide.

== Government ==
The township is governed by a three-member board of trustees, who are elected in November of odd-numbered years to a four-year term beginning on the following January 1. Two are elected in the year after the presidential election and one is elected in the year before it. There is also an elected township fiscal officer, who serves a four-year term beginning on April 1 of the year after the election, which is held in November of the year before the presidential election. Vacancies in the fiscal officership or on the board of trustees are filled by the remaining trustees.

== Transportation ==
The most significant highway in Adams Township is U.S. Route 24, which travels from northeast to southwest in the southeastern corner of the township.
