= Albert Arrowsmith =

Australian rugby league footballer (1887–1958)

Personal information
- Born: 9 October 1887
- Died: 23 July 1958 (aged 70)

Playing information
- Position: Wing
Club
Years	Team	Pld	T	G	FG	P
1918	Eastern Suburbs	1	0	0	0	0

Albert Arrowsmith (1887–1958) was an Australian rugby league footballer who played one match as a winger for the Eastern Suburbs against Glebe in 1918.
