= Robert Arrowsmith =

English cricketer (born 1952)

Personal information
- Full name: Robert Arrowsmith
- Born: 21 May 1952 (age 74); Denton, England
- Batting: Right-handed
- Bowling: Slow left-arm orthodox

Domestic team information
- Years: Team
- 1975–1979: Lancashire
- First-class debut: 11 August 1976 Lancashire v Warwickshire
- Last First-class: 23 June 1979 Lancashire v Middlesex
- List A debut: 3 August 1975 Lancashire v Leicestershire

Career statistics
Competition	First-class	List A
Matches	43	1
Runs scored	286	dnb
Batting average	10.21	–
100s/50s	0/0	–/–
Top score	39	–
Balls bowled	6477	36
Wickets	99	1
Bowling average	28.24	36.00
5 wickets in innings	4	–
10 wickets in match	0	–
Best bowling	6–29	1–36
Catches/stumpings	13/–	0/–
- Source: CricketArchive, 26 November 2009

Robert Arrowsmith (born 21 May 1952) is an English former cricketer who played 43 first-class matches and one List A game for Lancashire County Cricket Club between 1975 and 1979. After leaving Lancashire, he later played for Northumberland in the Minor Counties Cricket Championship.
