= Noble Township, Defiance County, Ohio =

Township in Ohio, US

- Township
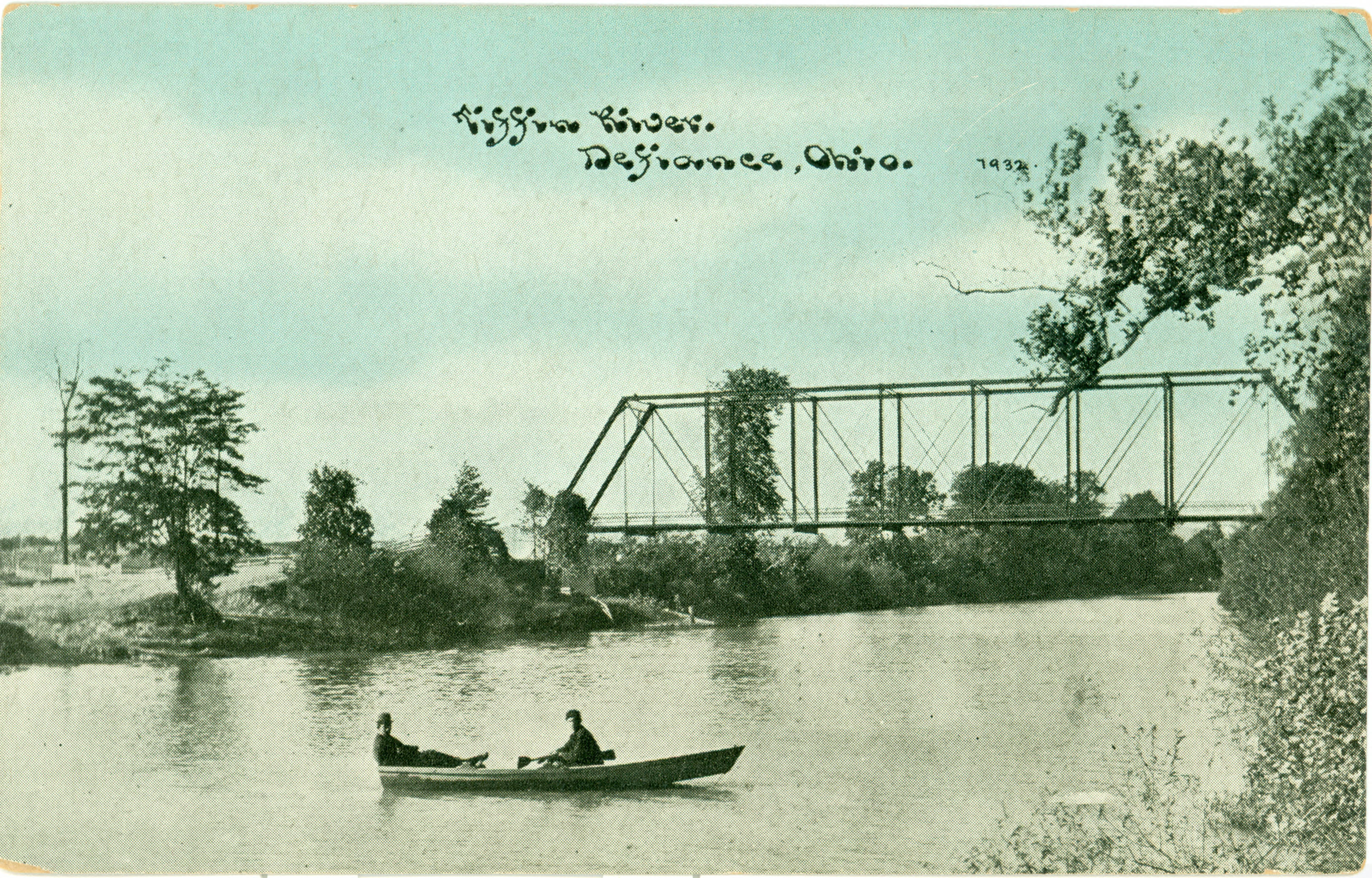
- 1910s postcard of the Dey Road Bridge

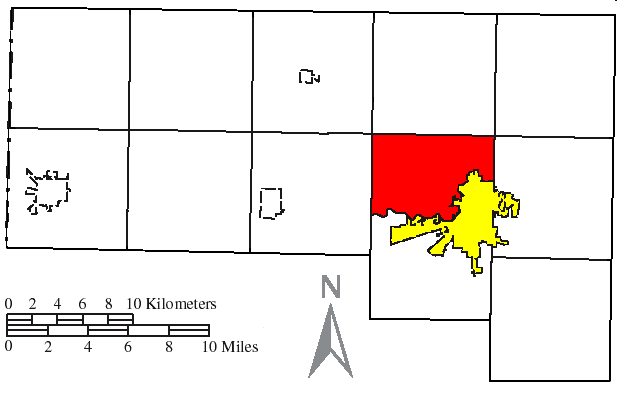
- Location of Noble Township (red) in Defiance County, adjacent to the city of Defiance (yellow)
- Coordinates: 41°18′7″N 84°22′34″W
- Country: United States
- State: Ohio
- County: Defiance

Area
  - Total: 23.6 sq mi (61.2 km^{2})
  - Land: 23.4 sq mi (60.6 km^{2})
  - Water: 0.23 sq mi (0.6 km^{2})
- Elevation: 702 ft (214 m)

Population (2020)
  - Total: 5,909
  - Density: 253/sq mi (97.5/km^{2})
- Time zone: UTC-5 (Eastern (EST))
  - Summer (DST): UTC-4 (EDT)
- FIPS code: 39-56014
- GNIS feature ID: 1086037

Noble Township is one of the twelve townships of Defiance County, Ohio, United States. The 2020 census found 5,909 people in the township.

== Geography ==
Located in the eastern part of the county, it borders the following townships:

- Tiffin Township - north
- Adams Township - northeast corner
- Richland Township - east
- Defiance Township - south
- Delaware Township - west
- Washington Township - northwest corner

A part of the county seat of Defiance is located in southeastern Noble Township.

== Name and history ==
Statewide, other Noble Townships are located in Auglaize and Noble counties.

== Government ==
The township is governed by a three-member board of trustees, who are elected in November of odd-numbered years to a four-year term beginning on the following January 1. Two are elected in the year after the presidential election and one is elected in the year before it. There is also an elected township fiscal officer, who serves a four-year term beginning on April 1 of the year after the election, which is held in November of the year before the presidential election. Vacancies in the fiscal officership or on the board of trustees are filled by the remaining trustees.

== Transportation ==
U.S. Route 24 travels through the southern part of Noble Township from its southern border to its eastern border. Other significant roads in the township include:

- State Route 15, which travels from northwest to south through the center of the township
- State Route 18, which travels from east to west through the center of the township
- State Route 66, which travels from north to south through the eastern half of the township
- State Route 424, a short distance of which travels along the north bank of the Maumee River in the southern half of the township

Defiance Memorial Airport is located in the northwestern corner of Noble Township.
