= Sue Arrowsmith =

British artist (1950–2014)

- Born: 1950; Lancashire, England
- Died: 2014 (aged 63–64)
- Known for: Mixed media artworks

Sue Arrowsmith (1950–2014) was a British artist notable for her experimental photographic and mixed media compositions.

== Biography ==
Born in Lancashire, Arrowsmith graduated from the University of Nottingham in 1971 before studying at the Slade School of Fine Art in London from 1973 to 1975. Her first solo show was in London in 1982, and in 1985 she had a solo exhibition, which included a series of self-portraits, at the Serpentine Galleries in London's Kensington Gardens. During 1986 and 1987 Arrowsmith was the 'artist in residence' at Wolfson College and at the Kettle's Yard Gallery in Cambridge. From 1987, works by Arrowsmith featured on several occasions in the John Moores Painting Prize exhibition in Liverpool. Examples of her work were also included in the 1988 Excavations group show in Vienna and Southampton and in Photography Now at Tate Liverpool and the Victoria & Albert Museum during 1988 and 1989. Her photographs also featured in the Whitechapel Gallery's 2000 review show of experimental British art, Live in Your Head:Concept and Experiment in Britain 1965-1975. Arrowsmith was a regular exhibitor with the Anthony Reynolds Gallery and after her death the Gallery donated a small number of her works to the Tate.
