= 1888 United States presidential election in Ohio =

- November 6, 1888
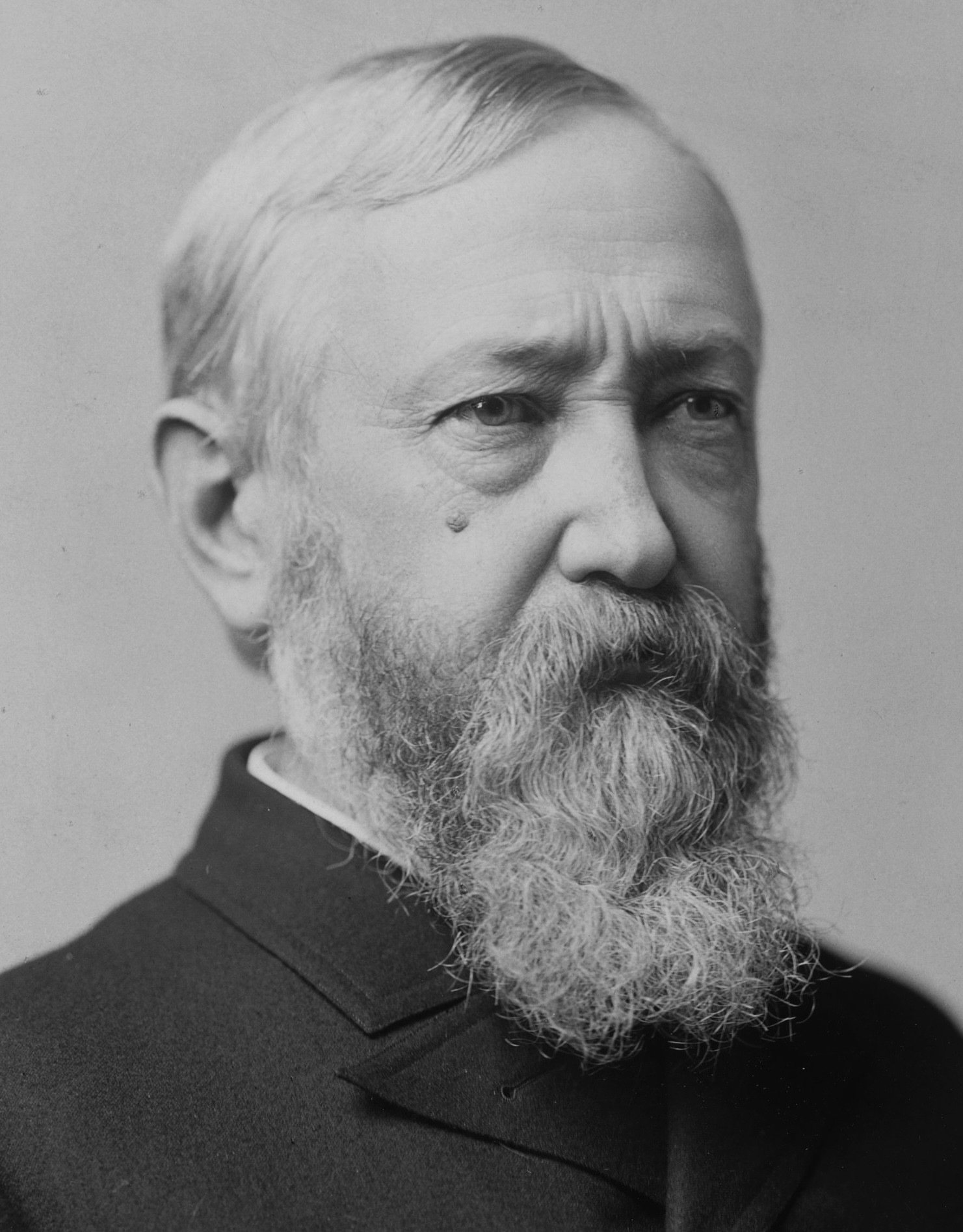

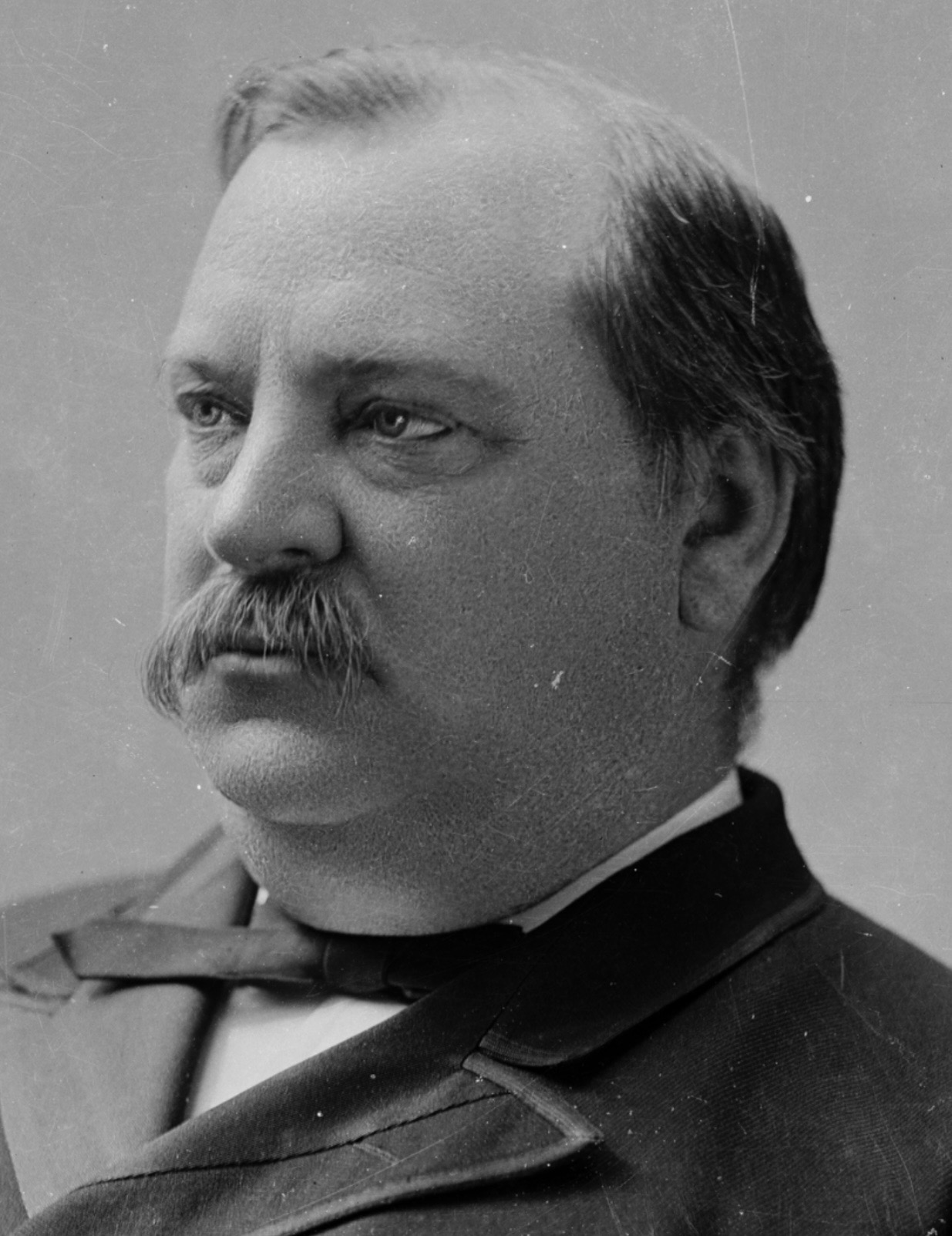
Nominee	Benjamin Harrison	Grover Cleveland
Party	Republican	Democratic
Home state	Indiana	New York
Running mate	Levi P. Morton	Allen G. Thurman
Electoral vote	23	0
Popular vote	416,054	396,455
Percentage	49.51%	47.18%
County results
Harrison
40–50%
50–60%
60–70%
70–80%
Cleveland
40–50%
50–60%
60–70%
70–80%
President before election
Grover Cleveland
Democratic
Elected President
Benjamin Harrison
Republican

The 1888 United States presidential election in Ohio was held on November 6, 1888, as part of the 1888 United States presidential election. State voters chose 23 electors to the Electoral College, who voted for president and vice president.

Ohio was narrowly won by Republican Party candidate, Benjamin Harrison, with 49.51% of the popular vote. The Democratic Party candidate, incumbent President Grover Cleveland, garnered 47.18% of the popular vote.

== Results ==
1888 United States presidential election in Ohio
Party	Candidate	Votes	Percentage	Electoral votes
Republican	Benjamin Harrison	416,054	49.51%	23
Democratic	Grover Cleveland (incumbent)	396,455	47.18%	0
Prohibition	Clinton B. Fisk	24,356	2.90%	0
Union Labor	Alson Streeter	3,496	0.42%	0
Totals		840,361	100.0%	23

=== Results by county ===
County	Benjamin Harrison Republican		Grover Cleveland Democratic		Clinton B. Fisk Prohibition		Alson Streeter Union Labor		Margin		Total votes cast
County	#	%	#	%	#	%	#	%	#	%	Total votes cast
Adams	2,870	47.71%	3,022	50.24%	123	2.04%	0	0.00%	-152	-2.53%	6,015
Allen	3,761	41.07%	5,123	55.94%	240	2.62%	34	0.37%	-1,362	-14.87%	9,158
Ashland	2,445	42.32%	3,152	54.56%	180	3.12%	0	0.00%	-707	-12.24%	5,777
Ashtabula	7,164	67.39%	2,675	25.16%	758	7.13%	34	0.32%	4,489	42.23%	10,631
Athens	4,570	69.58%	1,612	24.54%	339	5.16%	47	0.72%	2,958	45.04%	6,568
Auglaize	2,212	35.55%	3,928	63.12%	82	1.32%	1	0.02%	-1,716	-27.58%	6,223
Belmont	6,615	51.55%	5,778	45.02%	435	3.39%	5	0.04%	837	6.52%	12,833
Brown	3,055	40.95%	4,237	56.79%	169	2.27%	0	0.00%	-1,182	-15.84%	7,461
Butler	4,143	34.77%	7,454	62.55%	262	2.20%	57	0.48%	-3,311	-27.79%	11,916
Carroll	2,405	55.81%	1,746	40.52%	130	3.02%	28	0.65%	659	15.29%	4,309
Champaign	3,933	53.58%	3,049	41.53%	351	4.78%	8	0.11%	884	12.04%	7,341
Clark	7,128	51.79%	5,860	42.58%	761	5.53%	13	0.09%	1,268	9.21%	13,762
Clermont	4,097	48.17%	4,180	49.15%	207	2.43%	21	0.25%	-83	-0.98%	8,505
Clinton	3,816	59.53%	2,305	35.96%	289	4.51%	0	0.00%	1,511	23.57%	6,410
Columbiana	7,700	57.08%	5,154	38.21%	473	3.51%	163	1.21%	2,546	18.87%	13,490
Coshocton	2,768	42.21%	3,567	54.39%	223	3.40%	0	0.00%	-799	-12.18%	6,558
Crawford	2,681	33.58%	5,085	63.68%	185	2.32%	34	0.43%	-2,404	-30.11%	7,985
Cuyahoga	25,994	50.92%	23,949	46.92%	719	1.41%	384	0.75%	2,045	4.01%	51,046
Darke	4,267	41.84%	5,495	53.88%	424	4.16%	13	0.13%	-1,228	-12.04%	10,199
Defiance	2,245	37.23%	3,567	59.15%	176	2.92%	42	0.70%	-1,322	-21.92%	6,030
Delaware	3,432	49.66%	3,004	43.47%	450	6.51%	25	0.36%	428	6.19%	6,911
Erie	3,721	45.49%	4,322	52.84%	119	1.45%	17	0.21%	-601	-7.35%	8,179
Fairfield	3,058	37.64%	4,846	59.65%	220	2.71%	0	0.00%	-1,788	-22.01%	8,124
Fayette	3,316	58.44%	2,192	38.63%	164	2.89%	2	0.04%	1,124	19.81%	5,674
Franklin	13,453	47.59%	14,126	49.97%	603	2.13%	89	0.31%	-673	-2.38%	28,271
Fulton	2,901	55.72%	1,997	38.36%	288	5.53%	20	0.38%	904	17.36%	5,206
Gallia	3,651	61.33%	2,216	37.22%	86	1.44%	0	0.00%	1,435	24.11%	5,953
Geauga	2,712	71.80%	843	22.32%	216	5.72%	6	0.16%	1,869	49.48%	3,777
Greene	4,893	61.70%	2,682	33.82%	353	4.45%	2	0.03%	2,211	27.88%	7,930
Guernsey	3,560	54.40%	2,520	38.51%	450	6.88%	14	0.21%	1,040	15.89%	6,544
Hamilton	41,507	51.50%	37,661	46.73%	470	0.58%	953	1.18%	3,846	4.77%	80,591
Hancock	4,634	48.49%	4,539	47.49%	351	3.67%	33	0.35%	95	0.99%	9,557
Hardin	3,611	49.54%	3,339	45.81%	331	4.54%	8	0.11%	272	3.73%	7,289
Harrison	2,763	54.93%	1,927	38.31%	335	6.66%	5	0.10%	836	16.62%	5,030
Henry	2,047	35.29%	3,583	61.77%	168	2.90%	3	0.05%	-1,536	-26.48%	5,801
Highland	3,576	48.61%	3,489	47.42%	283	3.85%	9	0.12%	87	1.18%	7,357
Hocking	2,113	43.47%	2,541	52.27%	153	3.15%	54	1.11%	-428	-8.80%	4,861
Holmes	1,241	25.81%	3,388	70.45%	180	3.74%	0	0.00%	-2,147	-44.65%	4,809
Huron	4,392	53.35%	3,438	41.76%	356	4.32%	46	0.56%	954	11.59%	8,232
Jackson	3,570	53.67%	2,628	39.51%	249	3.74%	205	3.08%	942	14.16%	6,652
Jefferson	5,106	58.08%	3,293	37.46%	385	4.38%	7	0.08%	1,813	20.62%	8,791
Knox	3,588	48.68%	3,528	47.86%	248	3.36%	7	0.09%	60	0.81%	7,371
Lake	2,987	68.37%	1,157	26.48%	184	4.21%	41	0.94%	1,830	41.89%	4,369
Lawrence	4,713	59.54%	3,068	38.76%	135	1.71%	0	0.00%	1,645	20.78%	7,916
Licking	4,867	43.04%	6,199	54.82%	204	1.80%	37	0.33%	-1,332	-11.78%	11,307
Logan	4,115	59.34%	2,533	36.52%	283	4.08%	4	0.06%	1,582	22.81%	6,935
Lorain	5,235	57.32%	3,311	36.25%	583	6.38%	4	0.04%	1,924	21.07%	9,133
Lucas	9,443	51.29%	8,638	46.92%	290	1.58%	41	0.22%	805	4.37%	18,412
Madison	2,708	50.71%	2,376	44.49%	255	4.78%	1	0.02%	332	6.22%	5,340
Mahoning	6,162	51.31%	5,337	44.44%	439	3.66%	72	0.60%	825	6.87%	12,010
Marion	2,521	41.38%	3,297	54.12%	274	4.50%	0	0.00%	-776	-12.74%	6,092
Medina	3,333	58.08%	2,181	38.00%	224	3.90%	1	0.02%	1,152	20.07%	5,739
Meigs	3,989	60.41%	2,413	36.54%	195	2.95%	6	0.09%	1,576	23.87%	6,603
Mercer	1,841	30.01%	4,146	67.58%	134	2.18%	14	0.23%	-2,305	-37.57%	6,135
Miami	5,312	53.04%	4,258	42.51%	426	4.25%	20	0.20%	1,054	10.52%	10,016
Monroe	1,621	29.04%	3,886	69.63%	74	1.33%	0	0.00%	-2,265	-40.58%	5,581
Montgomery	12,491	47.89%	13,142	50.38%	431	1.65%	20	0.08%	-651	-2.50%	26,084
Morgan	2,531	53.97%	1,974	42.09%	183	3.90%	2	0.04%	557	11.88%	4,690
Morrow	2,514	51.02%	2,068	41.97%	306	6.21%	39	0.79%	446	9.05%	4,927
Muskingum	6,234	49.97%	5,884	47.17%	337	2.70%	20	0.16%	350	2.81%	12,475
Noble	2,515	53.18%	2,087	44.13%	90	1.90%	37	0.78%	428	9.05%	4,729
Ottawa	1,730	35.73%	3,065	63.30%	43	0.89%	4	0.08%	-1,335	-27.57%	4,842
Paulding	2,975	50.51%	2,781	47.22%	133	2.26%	1	0.02%	194	3.29%	5,890
Perry	3,528	49.16%	3,474	48.40%	145	2.02%	30	0.42%	54	0.75%	7,177
Pickaway	3,046	43.40%	3,831	54.58%	142	2.02%	0	0.00%	-785	-11.18%	7,019
Pike	1,769	43.90%	2,162	53.65%	91	2.26%	8	0.20%	-393	-9.75%	4,030
Portage	3,880	52.36%	3,260	43.99%	249	3.36%	21	0.28%	620	8.37%	7,410
Preble	3,157	49.06%	2,966	46.09%	312	4.85%	0	0.00%	191	2.97%	6,435
Putnam	2,355	34.61%	4,261	62.62%	169	2.48%	20	0.29%	-1,906	-28.01%	6,805
Richland	4,188	43.43%	5,198	53.90%	246	2.55%	12	0.12%	-1,010	-10.47%	9,644
Ross	4,942	50.70%	4,584	47.03%	217	2.23%	4	0.04%	358	3.67%	9,747
Sandusky	3,218	44.10%	3,917	53.68%	112	1.53%	50	0.69%	-699	-9.58%	7,297
Scioto	4,070	55.02%	3,075	41.57%	156	2.11%	96	1.30%	995	13.45%	7,397
Seneca	4,165	43.08%	5,232	54.12%	213	2.20%	58	0.60%	-1,067	-11.04%	9,668
Shelby	2,447	39.67%	3,597	58.32%	119	1.93%	5	0.08%	-1,150	-18.64%	6,168
Stark	8,763	47.29%	9,094	49.07%	543	2.93%	131	0.71%	-331	-1.79%	18,531
Summit	6,455	51.43%	5,495	43.78%	499	3.98%	103	0.82%	960	7.65%	12,552
Trumbull	6,299	62.47%	3,177	31.51%	573	5.68%	34	0.34%	3,122	30.96%	10,083
Tuscarawas	4,730	45.23%	5,484	52.44%	228	2.18%	15	0.14%	-754	-7.21%	10,457
Union	3,468	58.53%	2,224	37.54%	219	3.70%	14	0.24%	1,244	21.00%	5,925
Van Wert	3,411	48.18%	3,398	48.00%	269	3.80%	1	0.01%	13	0.18%	7,079
Vinton	1,832	48.93%	1,865	49.81%	43	1.15%	4	0.11%	-33	-0.88%	3,744
Warren	4,173	59.78%	2,598	37.22%	209	2.99%	1	0.01%	1,575	22.56%	6,981
Washington	4,921	51.24%	4,446	46.29%	218	2.27%	19	0.20%	475	4.95%	9,604
Wayne	4,161	43.77%	4,888	51.41%	448	4.71%	10	0.11%	-727	-7.65%	9,507
Williams	3,071	48.99%	2,977	47.50%	172	2.74%	48	0.77%	94	1.50%	6,268
Wood	5,199	51.68%	4,431	44.05%	380	3.78%	50	0.50%	768	7.63%	10,060
Wyandot	2,256	41.64%	2,981	55.02%	177	3.27%	4	0.07%	-725	-13.38%	5,418
Totals	416,055	49.57%	395,456	47.11%	24,356	2.90%	3,491	0.42%	20,599	2.45%	839,358

== See also ==
- United States presidential elections in Ohio
