= Tiffin Township, Defiance County, Ohio =

Township in Ohio, US

- Township
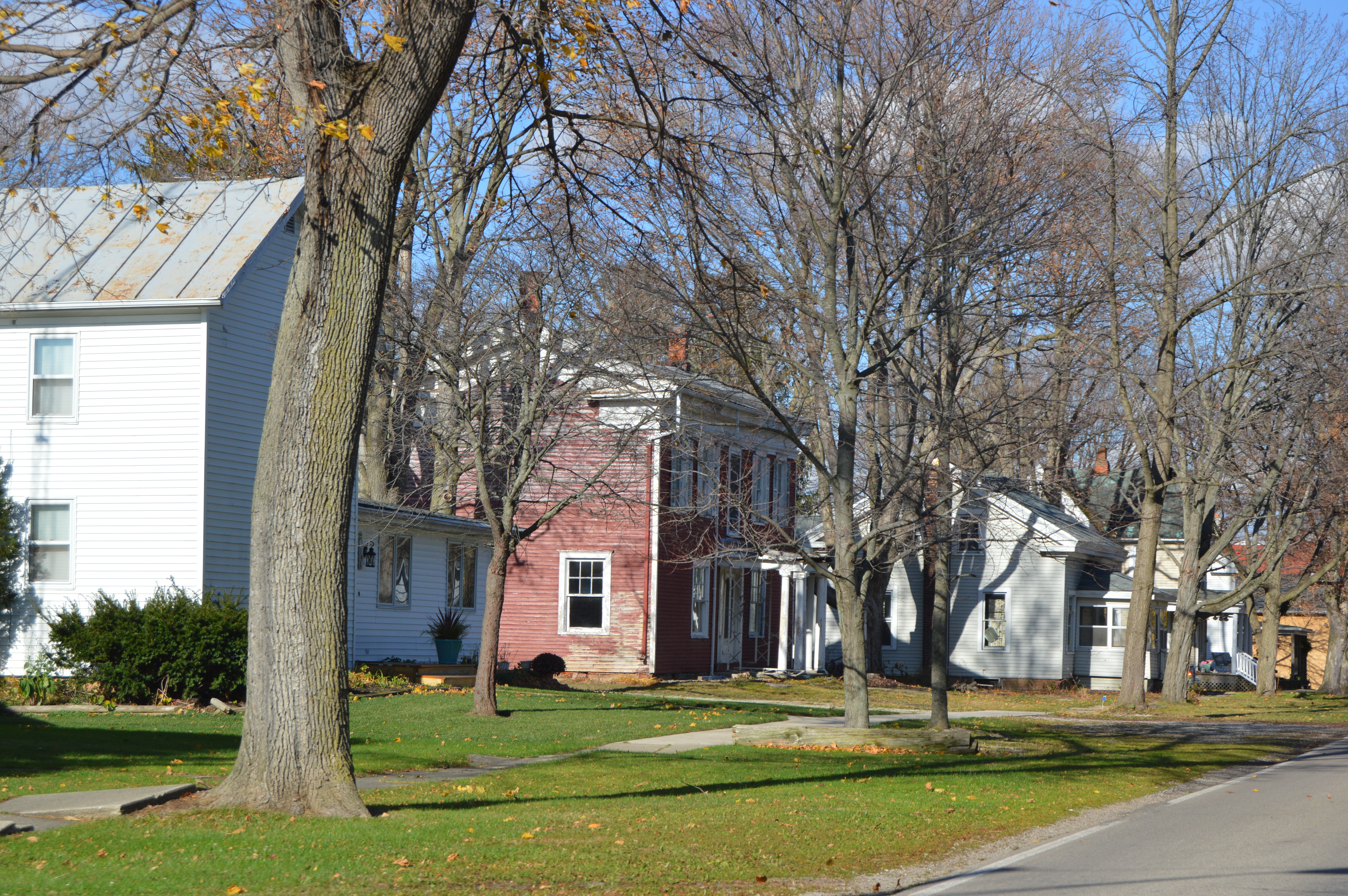
- Main Street in Evansport

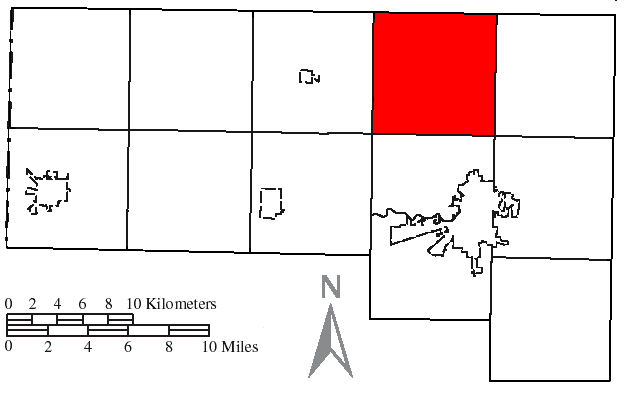
- Location of Tiffin Township in Defiance County
- Coordinates: 41°22′58″N 84°23′49″W
- Country: United States
- State: Ohio
- County: Defiance

Area
  - Total: 36.42 sq mi (94.32 km^{2})
  - Land: 36.36 sq mi (94.16 km^{2})
  - Water: 0.062 sq mi (0.16 km^{2})
- Elevation: 712 ft (217 m)

Population (2020)
  - Total: 1,586
  - Density: 43.62/sq mi (16.84/km^{2})
- Time zone: UTC-5 (Eastern (EST))
  - Summer (DST): UTC-4 (EDT)
- FIPS code: 39-76772
- GNIS feature ID: 1086039

Tiffin Township is one of twelve townships in Defiance County, Ohio, United States. The 2020 census reported 1,586 residents in the township.

== Geography ==
Located in the northeastern part of the county, it borders the following townships:

- Springfield Township, Williams County - north
- Ridgeville Township, Henry County - northeast corner
- Adams Township - east
- Richland Township - southeast
- Noble Township - south
- Delaware Township - southwest corner
- Washington Township - west
- Pulaski Township, Williams County - northwest corner

No municipalities are located in Tiffin Township, although the unincorporated community of Evansport lies on its border with Springfield Township.

== Name and history ==
Tiffin Township was established in 1832, and named for the Tiffin River which flows through it. Statewide, the only other Tiffin Township is located in Adams County.

== Government ==
The township is governed by a three-member board of trustees, who are elected in November of odd-numbered years to a four-year term beginning on the following January 1. Two are elected in the year after the presidential election and one is elected in the year before it. There is also an elected township fiscal officer, who serves a four-year term beginning on April 1 of the year after the election, which is held in November of the year before the presidential election. Vacancies in the fiscal officership or on the board of trustees are filled by the remaining trustees.

== Transportation ==
Two significant highways in Tiffin Township are State Route 15, which travels from northwest to southeast in the southwestern corner of the township; and State Route 66, which travels north–south through the eastern half of the township.
