= Mount Arrowsmith (disambiguation) =

Mount Arrowsmith is on Vancouver Island, British Columbia, Canada.

Mount Arrowsmith may also refer to:

- Mount Arrowsmith (Antarctica)
- Mount Arrowsmith (New Zealand)
