= Defiance County, Ohio =

County in Ohio, United States

- County
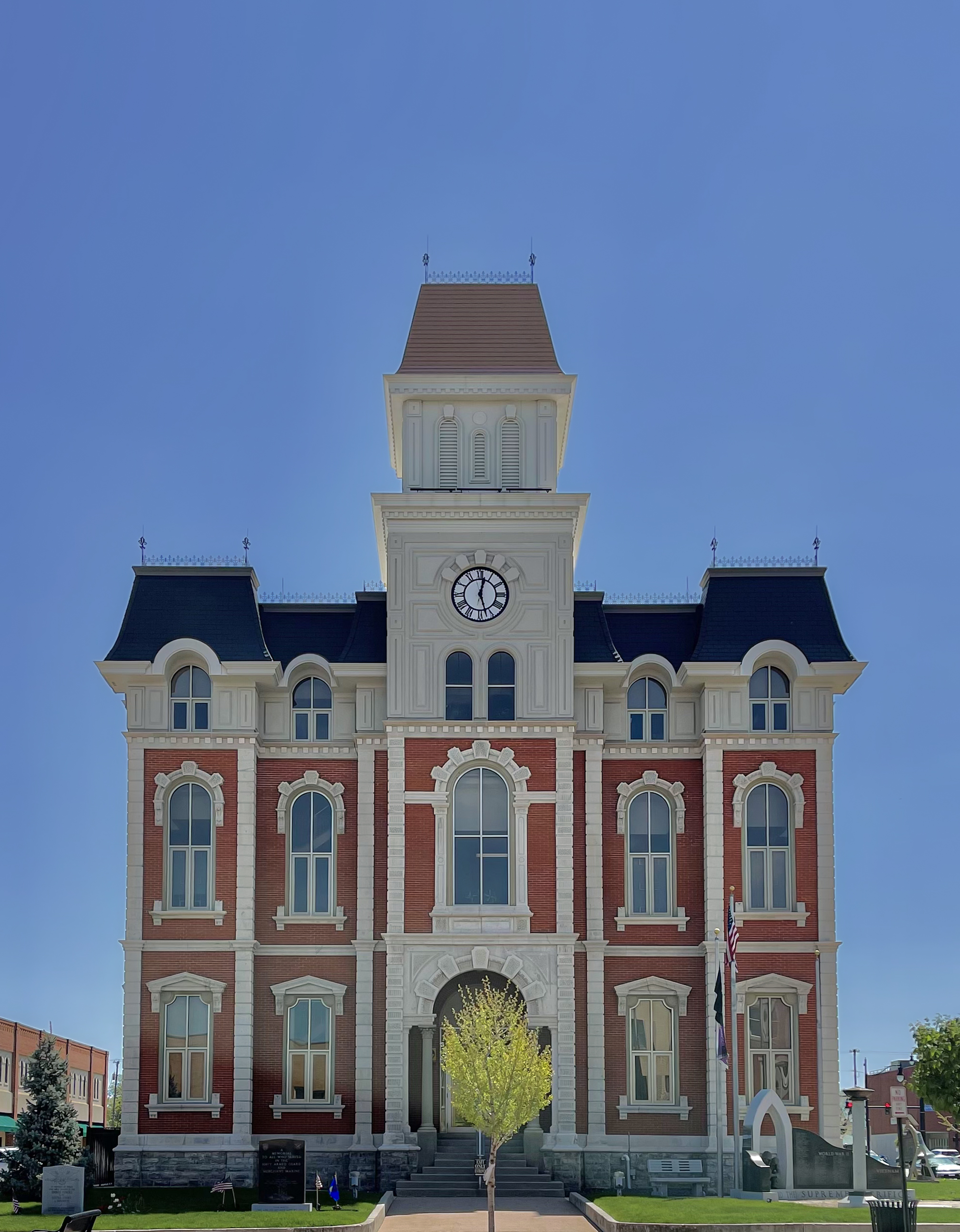
- Defiance County Courthouse

- Flag Seal

- Location within the U.S. state of Ohio
- Coordinates: 41°19′N 84°29′W
- Country: United States
- State: Ohio
- Founded: April 7, 1845
- Named for: Fort Defiance
- Seat: Defiance
- Largest city: Defiance

Area
  - Total: 414 sq mi (1,070 km^{2})
  - Land: 411 sq mi (1,060 km^{2})
  - Water: 2.7 sq mi (7.0 km^{2}) 0.7%

Population (2020)
  - Total: 38,286
  - Estimate (2025): 38,292 ▲
  - Density: 92/sq mi (36/km^{2})
- Time zone: UTC−5 (Eastern)
  - Summer (DST): UTC−4 (EDT)
- Congressional district: 9th
- Website: www.defiance-county.com

Defiance County is a county located in the U.S. state of Ohio. As of the 2020 census, the population was 38,286. Its county seat and largest city is Defiance. The county was named after an early Army fortification, Fort Defiance, which was so named by Mad Anthony Wayne to signify the settlers' "defiance" of the Indians. The Defiance, OH Micropolitan Statistical Area includes all of Defiance County.

== Geography ==
According to the U.S. Census Bureau, the county has a total area of 414 square miles (1,070 km^{2}), of which 411 square miles (1,060 km^{2}) is land and 2.7 square miles (7.0 km^{2}) (0.7%) is water.

=== Adjacent counties ===
- Williams County (north)
- Henry County (east)
- Putnam County (southeast)
- Paulding County (south)
- Allen County, Indiana (southwest)
- DeKalb County, Indiana (west)

== Demographics ==
Historical population
Census	Pop.	Note	%±
1850	6,966		—
1860	11,886		70.6%
1870	15,719		32.2%
1880	22,515		43.2%
1890	25,769		14.5%
1900	26,387		2.4%
1910	24,498		−7.2%
1920	24,549		0.2%
1930	22,714		−7.5%
1940	24,367		7.3%
1950	25,925		6.4%
1960	31,508		21.5%
1970	36,949		17.3%
1980	39,987		8.2%
1990	39,350		−1.6%
2000	39,500		0.4%
2010	39,037		−1.2%
2020	38,286		−1.9%
2025 (est.)	38,292	▲	0.0%
U.S. Decennial Census; 1790–1960 1900–1990; 1990–2000 2020

=== 2020 census ===
As of the 2020 census, the county had a population of 38,286. The median age was 41.4 years. 23.2% of residents were under the age of 18 and 20.0% of residents were 65 years of age or older. For every 100 females there were 98.2 males, and for every 100 females age 18 and over there were 96.0 males age 18 and over.

The racial makeup of the county was 87.9% White, 1.7% Black or African American, 0.4% American Indian and Alaska Native, 0.4% Asian, <0.1% Native Hawaiian and Pacific Islander, 3.5% from some other race, and 6.0% from two or more races. Hispanic or Latino residents of any race comprised 10.3% of the population.

46.4% of residents lived in urban areas, while 53.6% lived in rural areas.

There were 15,482 households in the county, of which 29.3% had children under the age of 18 living in them. Of all households, 50.5% were married-couple households, 18.5% were households with a male householder and no spouse or partner present, and 23.9% were households with a female householder and no spouse or partner present. About 27.8% of all households were made up of individuals and 12.6% had someone living alone who was 65 years of age or older.

There were 16,539 housing units, of which 6.4% were vacant. Among occupied housing units, 76.1% were owner-occupied and 23.9% were renter-occupied. The homeowner vacancy rate was 1.2% and the rental vacancy rate was 6.7%.

=== Racial and ethnic composition ===
Defiance County, Ohio – Racial and ethnic composition Note: the US Census treats Hispanic/Latino as an ethnic category. This table excludes Latinos from the racial categories and assigns them to a separate category. Hispanics/Latinos may be of any race.
Race / ethnicity (NH = Non-Hispanic)	Pop 1980	Pop 1990	Pop 2000	Pop 2010	Pop 2020	% 1980	% 1990	% 2000	% 2010	% 2020
White alone (NH)	37,178	35,999	35,471	34,345	32,276	92.98%	91.48%	89.80%	87.98%	84.30%
Black or African American alone (NH)	207	472	657	666	598	0.52%	1.20%	1.66%	1.71%	1.56%
Native American or Alaska Native alone (NH)	47	63	76	65	79	0.12%	0.16%	0.19%	0.17%	0.21%
Asian alone (NH)	101	118	138	117	133	0.25%	0.30%	0.35%	0.30%	0.35%
Native Hawaiian or Pacific Islander alone (NH)	x	x	3	11	15	x	x	0.01%	0.03%	0.04%
Other race alone (NH)	53	25	18	18	88	0.13%	0.06%	0.05%	0.05%	0.23%
Mixed race or Multiracial (NH)	x	x	280	406	1,147	x	x	0.71%	1.04%	3.00%
Hispanic or Latino (any race)	2,401	2,673	2,857	3,409	3,950	6.00%	6.79%	7.23%	8.73%	10.32%
Total	39,987	39,350	39,500	39,037	38,286	100.00%	100.00%	100.00%	100.00%	100.00%

=== 2010 census ===
As of the 2010 United States census, there were 39,037 people, 15,268 households, and 10,792 families living in the county. The population density was 94.9 inhabitants per square mile (36.6/km^{2}). There were 16,729 housing units at an average density of 40.7 units per square mile (15.7 units/km^{2}). The racial makeup of the county was 92.8% white, 1.9% black or African American, 0.3% Asian, 0.3% American Indian, 2.8% from other races, and 2.0% from two or more races. Those of Hispanic or Latino origin made up 8.7% of the population. In terms of ancestry, 42.3% were German, 12.5% were Irish, 9.6% were English, and 7.7% were American.

Of the 15,268 households, 32.4% had children under the age of 18 living with them, 55.1% were married couples living together, 10.8% had a female householder with no husband present, 29.3% were non-families, and 24.6% of all households were made up of individuals. The average household size was 2.51 and the average family size was 2.97. The median age was 39.4 years.

The median income for a household in the county was $44,480 and the median income for a family was $54,472. Males had a median income of $44,354 versus $30,610 for females. The per capita income for the county was $22,139. About 11.2% of families and 12.7% of the population were below the poverty line, including 18.0% of those under age 18 and 7.1% of those age 65 or over.

=== 2000 census ===
As of the census of 2000, there were 39,500 people, 15,138 households, and 11,020 families living in the county. The population density was 96 inhabitants per square mile (37/km^{2}). There were 16,040 housing units at an average density of 39 units per square mile (15/km^{2}). The racial makeup of the county was 92.59% White, 1.75% Black or African American, 0.26% Native American, 0.36% Asian, 0.02% Pacific Islander, 3.59% from other races, and 1.43% from two or more races. 7.23% of the population were Hispanic or Latino of any race. 45.6% were of German, 13.5% American, 6.8% Irish and 5.1% English ancestry according to Census 2000.

There were 15,138 households, out of which 34.30% had children under the age of 18 living with them, 58.90% were married couples living together, 9.60% had a female householder with no husband present, and 27.20% were non-families. 23.00% of all households were made up of individuals, and 9.50% had someone living alone who was 65 years of age or older. The average household size was 2.57 and the average family size was 3.02.

In the county, the population was spread out, with 26.50% under the age of 18, 9.20% from 18 to 24, 27.40% from 25 to 44, 23.90% from 45 to 64, and 12.90% who were 65 years of age or older. The median age was 36 years. For every 100 females there were 97.30 males. For every 100 females age 18 and over, there were 94.90 males.

The median income for a household in the county was $44,938, and the median income for a family was $50,876. Males had a median income of $37,936 versus $23,530 for females. The per capita income for the county was $19,667. About 4.50% of families and 5.60% of the population were below the poverty line, including 6.40% of those under age 18 and 5.30% of those age 65 or over.

== Politics ==
Prior to 1940, Defiance County was a Democratic stronghold, voting Republicans only three times since 1856. Starting with the 1940 election, it has been a Republican stronghold, with the exception of Democrat Lyndon Johnson in the 1964 presidential election.

United States presidential election results for Defiance County, Ohio
Year	Republican		Democratic		Third party(ies)	
Year	No.	%	No.	%	No.	%
1856	821	46.81%	895	51.03%	38	2.17%
1860	1,038	43.87%	1,304	55.11%	24	1.01%
1864	1,146	42.15%	1,573	57.85%	0	0.00%
1868	1,108	36.85%	1,899	63.15%	0	0.00%
1872	1,093	38.31%	1,720	60.29%	40	1.40%
1876	1,520	34.43%	2,888	65.41%	7	0.16%
1880	1,977	38.41%	3,140	61.01%	30	0.58%
1884	2,184	39.57%	3,288	59.58%	47	0.85%
1888	2,245	37.23%	3,567	59.15%	218	3.62%
1892	2,062	35.09%	3,311	56.35%	503	8.56%
1896	2,414	36.01%	4,239	63.24%	50	0.75%
1900	2,684	40.80%	3,766	57.25%	128	1.95%
1904	3,032	47.43%	3,216	50.31%	144	2.25%
1908	2,531	39.05%	3,754	57.91%	197	3.04%
1912	872	15.84%	2,784	50.58%	1,848	33.58%
1916	2,565	42.36%	3,359	55.47%	131	2.16%
1920	5,987	60.54%	3,723	37.64%	180	1.82%
1924	4,841	52.55%	3,227	35.03%	1,145	12.43%
1928	6,289	64.33%	3,487	35.67%	0	0.00%
1932	3,871	36.54%	6,532	61.65%	192	1.81%
1936	5,000	42.84%	5,608	48.05%	1,062	9.10%
1940	8,010	65.00%	4,313	35.00%	0	0.00%
1944	7,450	67.21%	3,634	32.79%	0	0.00%
1948	5,927	56.94%	4,454	42.79%	28	0.27%
1952	8,834	67.98%	4,161	32.02%	0	0.00%
1956	8,786	69.03%	3,941	30.97%	0	0.00%
1960	8,912	63.12%	5,207	36.88%	0	0.00%
1964	5,048	36.70%	8,707	63.30%	0	0.00%
1968	7,348	52.64%	5,686	40.73%	925	6.63%
1972	8,914	65.40%	4,377	32.11%	339	2.49%
1976	7,526	55.02%	5,850	42.77%	303	2.22%
1980	9,358	59.84%	5,096	32.59%	1,185	7.58%
1984	10,951	67.89%	5,004	31.02%	175	1.08%
1988	9,566	63.13%	5,448	35.95%	139	0.92%
1992	7,195	41.80%	5,735	33.32%	4,281	24.87%
1996	7,469	47.00%	6,343	39.91%	2,081	13.09%
2000	9,540	58.74%	6,175	38.02%	527	3.24%
2004	11,397	61.55%	6,975	37.67%	144	0.78%
2008	10,407	54.11%	8,399	43.67%	426	2.22%
2012	10,176	55.49%	7,732	42.16%	431	2.35%
2016	11,688	63.70%	5,368	29.26%	1,293	7.05%
2020	13,038	67.27%	5,981	30.86%	362	1.87%
2024	13,302	69.07%	5,667	29.42%	291	1.51%

United States Senate election results for Defiance County, Ohio1
Year	Republican		Democratic		Third party(ies)	
Year	No.	%	No.	%	No.	%
2024	12,028	64.22%	5,880	31.39%	822	4.39%

== Communities ==
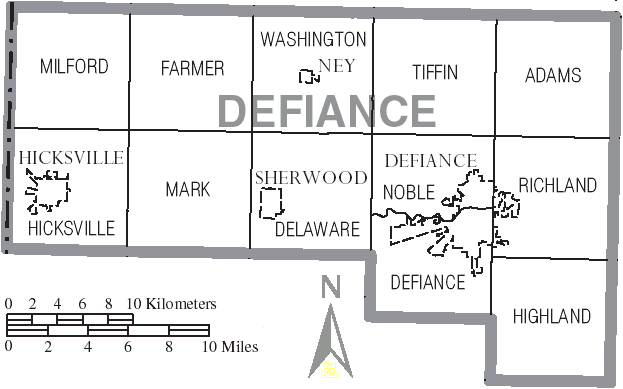
Map of Defiance County, Ohio with Municipal and Township Labels

=== City ===
- Defiance (county seat)

=== Villages ===
- Hicksville
- Ney
- Sherwood

=== Townships ===
- Adams
- Defiance
- Delaware
- Farmer
- Hicksville
- Highland
- Mark
- Milford
- Noble
- Richland
- Tiffin
- Washington

=== Census-designated place ===
- Brunersburg

=== Unincorporated communities ===
- Evansport
- Farmer
- Jewell
- Mark Center

== Education ==
School districts include:

- Ayersville Local School District
- Central Local School District
- Defiance City School District
- Edgerton Local School District
- Hicksville Exempted Village School District
- Northeastern Local School District

== In popular culture ==
The closeness of elections in Defiance County has also been referenced in fiction; the ABC political drama Scandal in its second season had as the center of the ongoing plot of the first half of that season, a vote manipulation conspiracy which bent the presidential election towards Republican candidate Fitzgerald Grant based on tampering of the voting machines in Defiance County.

== Economy ==
Defiance has been a largely manufacturing community with the presence of General Motors foundry, which once employed over 5,000 employees decades ago.

Currently, the largest employers in Defiance include:

-Johns Manville

-General Motors

-Mayville Engineering Products

-Maumee Valley Group

-Sabre Industries

== See also ==
- National Register of Historic Places listings in Defiance County, Ohio
