= Fairview High School (Sherwood, Ohio) =

Location
- 6289 US Highway 127; Sherwood, Ohio 43556; United States
- Coordinates: 41°20′59″N 84°33′11″W

Information
- Type: Public high school
- Established: 1958
- School district: Central Local School District
- Superintendent: Steve Arnold
- NCES School ID: 390467102628
- Principal: Tim Breyman
- Teaching staff: 18.58 (on an FTE basis)
- Grades: 9–12
- Enrollment: 265 (2023–2024)
- Student to teacher ratio: 14.26
- Hours in school day: 7 hours
- Colors: Black and gold
- Athletics conference: Green Meadows Conference
- Nickname: Apaches
- Newspaper: Apache News
- Website: www.centrallocal.org

Fairview High School is a public high school in Sherwood, Defiance County, Ohio, United States. It is the only high school in the Central Local School District.

== History ==
In 1958, all high school students in the area that would come to be known as the Central Local School District came to Farmer High School. Since the title of "Farmer" was inaccurate, considering that students from Mark Center, Sherwood, Ney as well as Farmer attended, administrators decided that the school needed a new name. It was then determined that there should be a competition to figure out the school's new name. Fairview, Green Meadows, and William Manahan were the three finalists, and Fairview won. Then another contest was held for the nickname. After several rounds of voting, the students decided on three more finalists: Apaches, Spartans, and Titans. The winning entry (Apaches) was submitted by Ward Fritz, Social Studies teacher, and Boys Basketball head coach.

== Activities ==
=== Fall ===
- Varsity and Junior Varsity Football
- Varsity and Junior Varsity Volleyball (Girls)
- Varsity and Junior Varsity Cross Country (Boys and Girls)
- Varsity and Junior Varsity Golf (Boys and Girls)
- Marching band
- Athletic Training
- Football Cheerleading

=== Winter ===
- Varsity, Junior Varsity, and Freshman Basketball (Boys and Girls)
- Varsity and Junior Varsity Wrestling
- Quiz Bowl
- Pep Band
- Stage Band
- Concert Band
- Basketball Cheerleading

=== Spring ===
- Varsity and Junior Varsity Baseball
- Varsity and Junior Varsity Softball
- Varsity and Junior Varsity Track and Field (Boys and Girls)

== Ohio High School Athletic Association State Championships ==
- Girls Basketball – 1989
- Boys Basketball - 1946*

* Title won by Farmer High School prior to consolidation into Fairview.

- Softball - 2021

== Notable alumni ==
- Bruce Berenyi, Major League Baseball player
- Ryan Radcliff, former college football quarterback for the Central Michigan Chippewas
