= Ohio State Route 249 =

State highway in Defiance County, Ohio, US

State Route 249

Route information
- Maintained by ODOT
- Length: 14.45 mi (23.26 km)
- Existed: 1925–present

Major junctions
- West end: CR 40 near Edgerton
- SR 2 in Farmer; US 127 near Ney
- East end: SR 15 in Ney

Location
- Country: United States
- State: Ohio
- Counties: Defiance

Highway system
- Ohio State Highway System; Interstate; US; State; Scenic
| ← SR 248 | → US 250 |

State Route 249 (SR 249) is an Ohio State Route that runs between the Indiana state line and Ney in the U.S. state of Ohio. The 14.45 miles (23.26 km) of SR 249 that lie within the state serve as a minor highway. None of the highway is listed on the National Highway System. The whole route is a rural two-lane highway and passes through farmland. The highway was first signed in 1925 and was a north–south route, a route that later became U.S. Route 127 (US 127). SR 249 was given its current route in 1927, as a replacement for SR 22. The route was completely paved by 1942.

== Route description ==
SR 249 heads southeast from the Indiana–Ohio state line, as a two-lane highway passing through farmland, with some houses. The route passes over the St. Joseph River and turns due east. The highway has an intersection at SR 49, in rural Defiance County. After the intersection with SR 49 the highway enters farmland and woodland, with a few houses. The route has an intersection with SR 2, this intersection is the western terminus of the SR 2 concurrency. The concurrency heads east, passing through farmland, until SR 2 turns north in the community of Farmer. SR 249 heads east having an intersection with US 127. The route turns southeast, before ending at an intersection with SR 15 in Ney.

There is no section of SR 249 that is included as a part of the National Highway System, a system of routes determined to be the most important for the nation's economy, mobility and defense. The highway is maintained by the Ohio Department of Transportation (ODOT) like all other state routes in the state. The department tracks the traffic volumes along all state highways as a part of its maintenance responsibilities using a metric called average annual daily traffic (AADT). This measurement is a calculation of the traffic level along a segment of roadway for any average day of the year. In 2009, ODOT figured that the lowest traffic level was 820 vehicles on the section that is concurrent with SR 2, and the peak traffic volume was 6,720 vehicles between US 127 and SR 15.

== History ==
The route that became SR 249 was first signed as SR 22 in 1923 following all of SR 249 as it is today and heading as far east-southeast as Marion. Also in this year the route east of Farmer was paved. SR 249 made its debut in 1925, as a north–south route, on a section of road that is now US 127. The route went from SR 22, now SR 249, north to SR 9, now SR 15. In 1927, SR 249 replaced part of SR 22, from the Indiana state line to Ney. The rest of the route from the Indiana state line to Farmer was paved in 1942. No significant changes have taken place to this state route since 1942.

== Major intersections ==
The entire route is in Defiance County.

| Location | mi | km | Destinations | Notes |
|---|---|---|---|---|
| Milford Township | 0.00 | 0.00 | CR 40 – Auburn | Western terminus of SR 249; Indiana state line |
| Milford Township | 2.96 | 4.76 | SR 49 – Hicksville, Edgerton | |
| Farmer Township | 7.05 | 11.35 | SR 2 west – Hicksville | Western end of SR 2 concurrency |
| Farmer Township | 9.06 | 14.58 | SR 2 east – Bryan | Eastern end of SR 2 concurrency |
| Washington Township | 13.01 | 20.94 | US 127 – Paulding, Bryan | |
| Ney | 14.45 | 23.26 | SR 15 – Bryan, Ney, Defiance | Eastern terminus of SR 249 |
1.000 mi = 1.609 km; 1.000 km = 0.621 mi: Concurrency terminus
