= Carryall Township, Ohio =

Township in Ohio, US

Carryall Township, Paulding County, Ohio
- Township
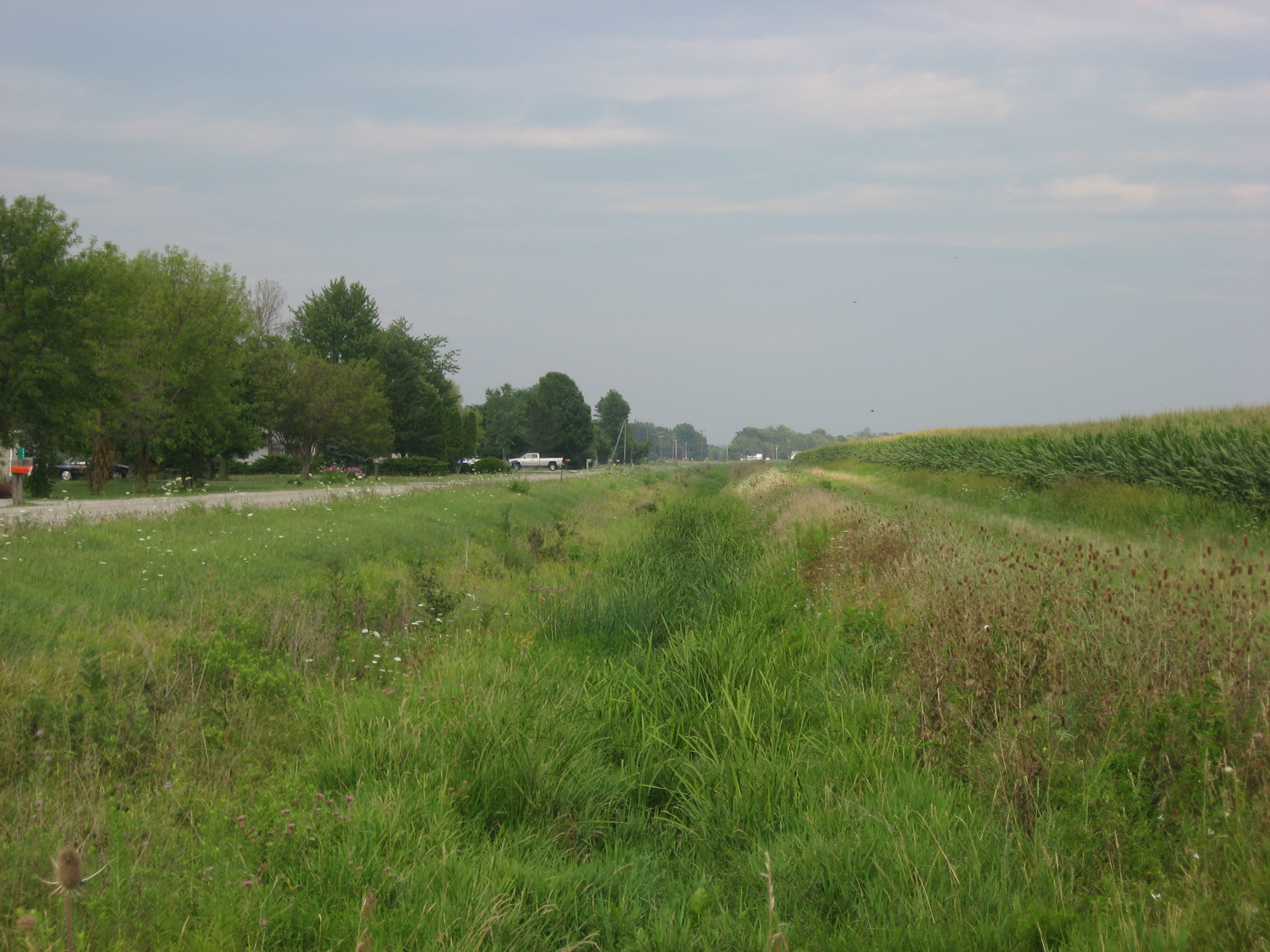
- An abandoned portion of the Wabash and Erie Canal in the township's southeast

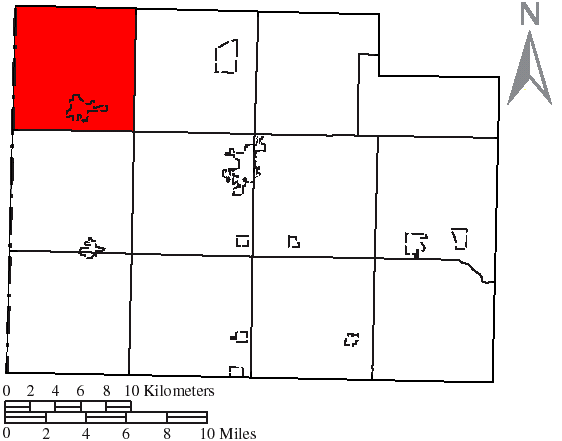
- Location of Carryall Township in Paulding County
- Coordinates: 41°11′39″N 84°44′33″W
- Country: United States
- State: Ohio
- County: Paulding

Area
  - Total: 36.3 sq mi (93.9 km^{2})
  - Land: 35.6 sq mi (92.3 km^{2})
  - Water: 0.62 sq mi (1.6 km^{2})
- Elevation: 709 ft (216 m)

Population (2020)
  - Total: 3,010
  - Density: 84/sq mi (32.6/km^{2})
- Time zone: UTC-5 (Eastern (EST))
  - Summer (DST): UTC-4 (EDT)
- FIPS code: 39-12308
- GNIS feature ID: 1086770
- Website: https://carryalltownshippauldingcounty.com/

Carryall Township is one of the twelve townships of Paulding County, Ohio, United States. The 2020 census found 3,010 people in the township.

== Geography ==
Located in the northwestern corner of the county along the Indiana line, it borders the following townships:

- Hicksville Township, Defiance County - north
- Mark Township, Defiance County - northeast corner
- Crane Township - east
- Paulding Township - southeast corner
- Harrison Township - south
- Maumee Township, Allen County, Indiana - southwest
- Scipio Township, Allen County, Indiana - west

The village of Antwerp is located in southern Carryall Township.

== Name and history ==
It is the only Carryall Township statewide.

== Government ==
The township is governed by a three-member board of trustees, who are elected in November of odd-numbered years to a four-year term beginning on the following January 1. Two are elected in the year after the presidential election and one is elected in the year before it. There is also an elected township fiscal officer, who serves a four-year term beginning on April 1 of the year after the election, which is held in November of the year before the presidential election. Vacancies in the fiscal officership or on the board of trustees are filled by the remaining trustees.
