= Crane Township, Ohio =

Crane Township, Ohio, may refer to:

- Crane Township, Paulding County, Ohio
- Crane Township, Wyandot County, Ohio
