= Milford Township, Ohio =

Milford Township, Ohio may refer to several places:

- Milford Township, Butler County, Ohio
- Milford Township, Defiance County, Ohio
- Milford Township, Knox County, Ohio
