= Hicksville Township, Defiance County, Ohio =

Township in Ohio, US

- Township
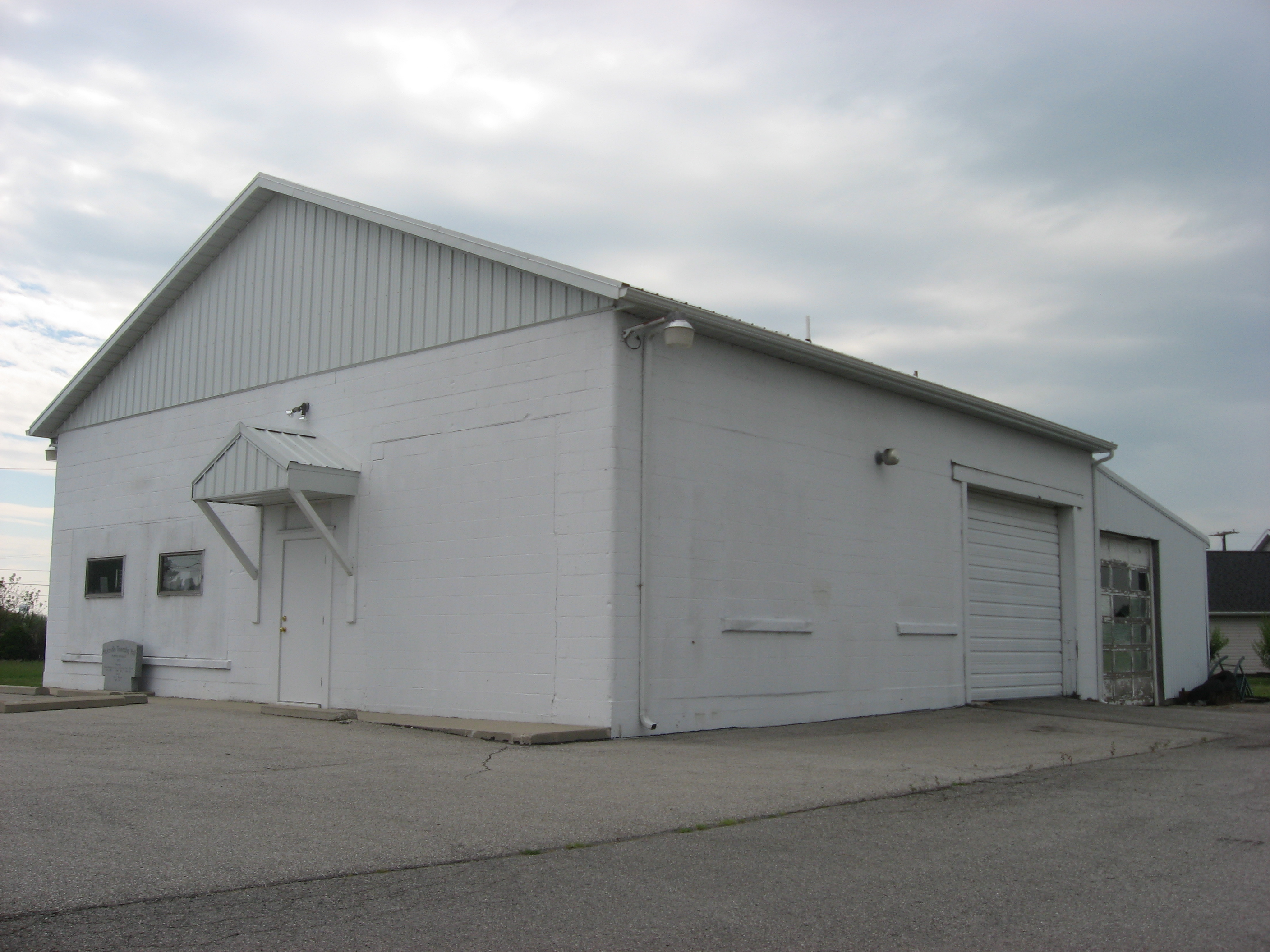
- Township hall, northeast of Hicksville

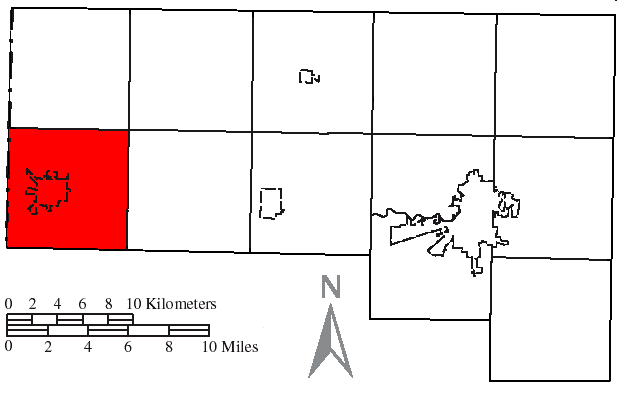
- Location of Hicksville Township in Defiance County
- Coordinates: 41°17′42″N 84°45′10″W
- Country: United States
- State: Ohio
- County: Defiance

Area
  - Total: 35.6 sq mi (92.2 km^{2})
  - Land: 35.6 sq mi (92.2 km^{2})
  - Water: 0 sq mi (0.0 km^{2})
- Elevation: 750 ft (230 m)

Population (2020)
  - Total: 4,872
  - Density: 137/sq mi (52.8/km^{2})
- Time zone: UTC-5 (Eastern (EST))
  - Summer (DST): UTC-4 (EDT)
- ZIP code: 43526
- Area code: 419
- FIPS code: 39-35112
- GNIS feature ID: 1086033

Hicksville Township is one of the twelve townships of Defiance County, Ohio, United States. The 2020 census found 4,872 people in the township.

== Geography ==
Located in the southwestern corner of the county along the Indiana line, it borders the following townships:

- Milford Township - north
- Farmer Township - northeast corner
- Mark Township - east
- Crane Township, Paulding County - southeast corner
- Carryall Township, Paulding County - south
- Scipio Township, Allen County, Indiana - southwest
- Newville Township, DeKalb County, Indiana - west

The village of Hicksville is located in western Hicksville Township.

== Name and history ==
Hicksville Township was organized in 1839. It is the only Hicksville Township statewide.

== Government ==
The township is governed by a three-member board of trustees, who are elected in November of odd-numbered years to a four-year term beginning on the following January 1. Two are elected in the year after the presidential election and one is elected in the year before it. There is also an elected township fiscal officer, who serves a four-year term beginning on April 1 of the year after the election, which is held in November of the year before the presidential election. Vacancies in the fiscal officership or on the board of trustees are filled by the remaining trustees.

== Transportation ==
Three state highways travel through Hicksville Township, all of which meet in the village of Hicksville:

- State Route 2, which travels from northeast to southwest
- State Route 18, which travels from northwest to east
- State Route 49, which travels generally from north to south
