= Washington Township, Defiance County, Ohio =

Township in Ohio, US

- Township
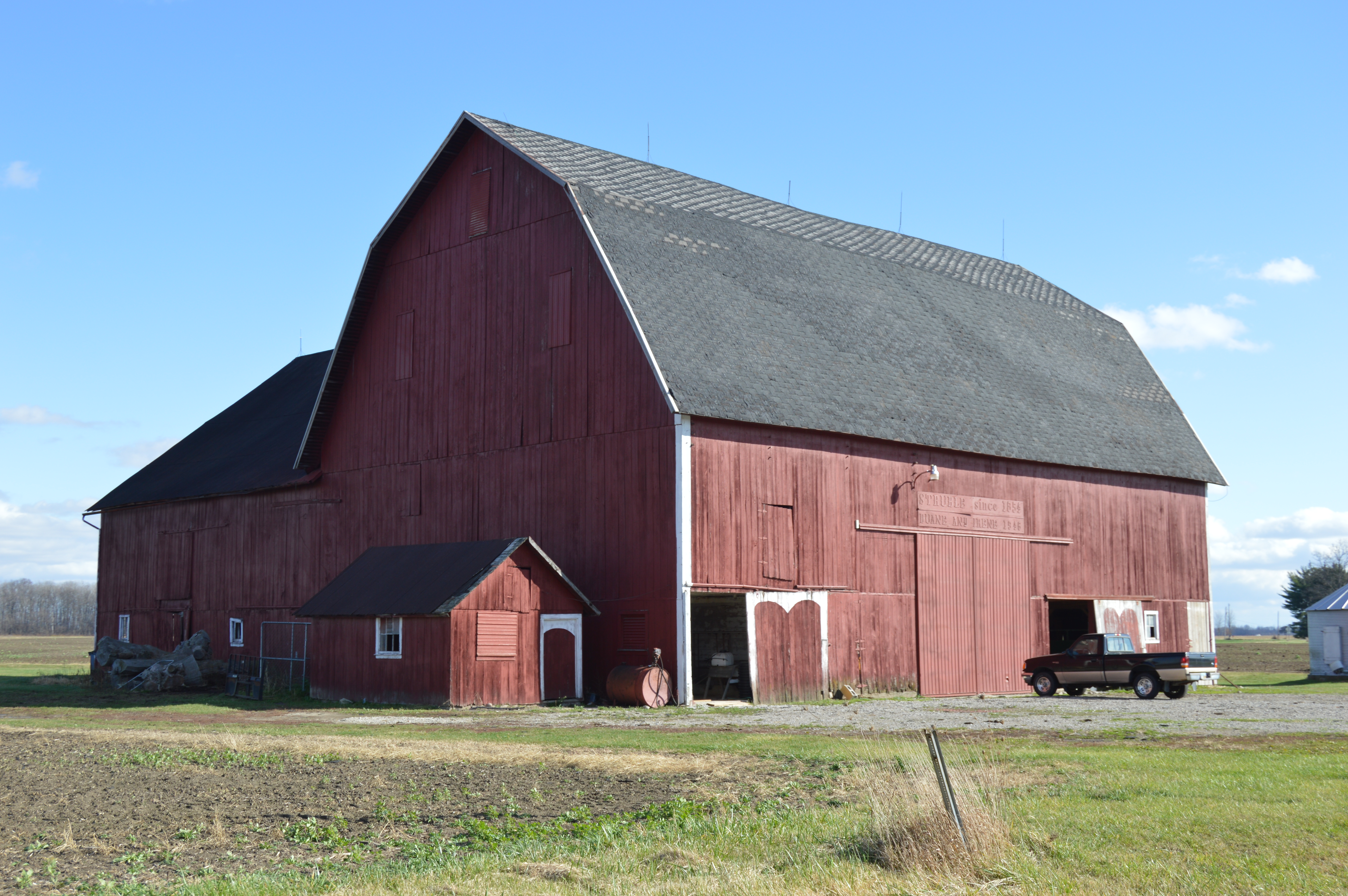
- Farm scene on Ney Williams Center Road

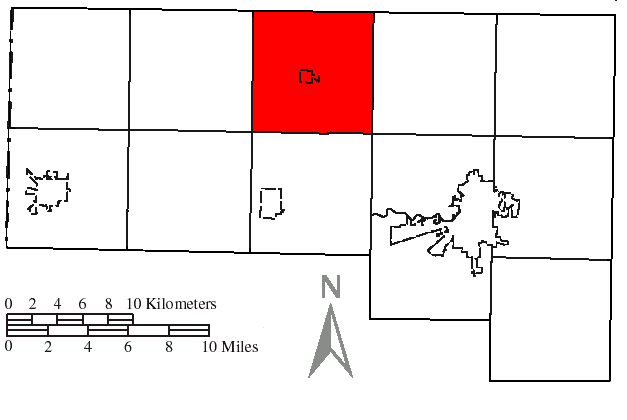
- Location of Washington Township in Defiance County
- Coordinates: 41°22′51″N 84°31′4″W
- Country: United States
- State: Ohio
- County: Defiance

Area
  - Total: 35.7 sq mi (92.5 km^{2})
  - Land: 35.7 sq mi (92.5 km^{2})
  - Water: 0 sq mi (0.0 km^{2})
- Elevation: 709 ft (216 m)

Population (2020)
  - Total: 1,528
  - Density: 42.8/sq mi (16.5/km^{2})
- Time zone: UTC-5 (Eastern (EST))
  - Summer (DST): UTC-4 (EDT)
- FIPS code: 39-81200
- GNIS feature ID: 1086040

Washington Township is one of the twelve townships of Defiance County, Ohio, United States. The 2020 census found 1,528 people in the township.

== Geography ==
Located in the northern part of the county, it borders the following townships:

- Pulaski Township, Williams County - north
- Springfield Township, Williams County - northeast corner
- Tiffin Township - east
- Noble Township - southeast corner
- Delaware Township - south
- Mark Township - southwest corner
- Farmer Township - west
- Center Township, Williams County - northwest corner

The village of Ney is located in central Washington Township.

== Name and history ==
Washington Township was established in 1838. Named for George Washington, first President of the United States, it is one of forty-three Washington Townships statewide.

== Government ==
The township is governed by a three-member board of trustees, who are elected in November of odd-numbered years to a four-year term beginning on the following January 1. Two are elected in the year after the presidential election and one is elected in the year before it. There is also an elected township fiscal officer, who serves a four-year term beginning on April 1 of the year after the election, which is held in November of the year before the presidential election. Vacancies in the fiscal officership or on the board of trustees are filled by the remaining trustees.

== Transportation ==
Significant highways in Washington Township include:

- U.S. Route 127, which travels from north to south through the western half of the township
- State Route 15, which travels from northwest to southeast through the center of the township
- State Route 249, which travels west from its beginning in Ney to the Farmer Township line
