= Maumee Township, Allen County, Indiana =

Maumee Township
- Township
- Location in Allen County, Indiana
- Coordinates: 41°08′14″N 84°50′22″W
- Country: United States
- State: Indiana
- County: Allen

Government
  - Type: Indiana township

Area
  - Total: 26.69 sq mi (69.13 km^{2})
  - Land: 26.37 sq mi (68.30 km^{2})
  - Water: 0.32 sq mi (0.83 km^{2}) 1.19%
- Elevation: 745 ft (227 m)

Population (2020)
  - Total: 2,647
  - Density: 99/sq mi (38.4/km^{2})
- ZIP code: 46797
- GNIS feature ID: 0453616

Maumee Township is one of twenty townships in Allen County, Indiana, United States. As of the 2010 census, its population was 2,620.

== Geography ==
According to the United States Census Bureau, Maumee Township covers an area of 26.69 square miles (69.13 km^{2}); of this, 26.37 square miles (68.30 km^{2}) is land and 0.32 square miles (0.83 km^{2}), or 1.19 percent, is water.

=== Cities, towns, villages ===
- Woodburn

=== Unincorporated towns ===
- Bluecast at 41.154216°N 84.869408°W

(This list is based on USGS data and may include former settlements.)

=== Adjacent townships ===
- Scipio Township (north)
- Carryall Township, Paulding County, Ohio (northeast)
- Harrison Township, Paulding County, Ohio (east)
- Jackson Township (south)
- Jefferson Township (southwest)
- Milan Township (west)
- Springfield Township (northwest)

=== Cemeteries ===
The township contains Diehl Cemetery.

=== Major highways ===
- US 24
- SR 101

== School districts ==
- East Allen County Schools

== Political districts ==
- Indiana's 3rd congressional district
- State House District 79
- State Senate District 14
