= Abe L. Biglow =

American politician

Abraham Lincoln Biglow (April 27, 1872 – March 15, 1923) was an American politician and businessman.

Born in Farmer, Ohio, Biglow went to school in Ada, Ohio and Washington, Pennsylvania. He began his professional career as a schoolteacher before joining the Williams County Telephone Company in 1893. In 1910, Biglow moved to Ashland, Wisconsin and worked for the telephone company as general manager. He then worked for the chemical and mining businesses. He served on the Ashland County, Wisconsin Board of Supervisors in 1914. In 1921, Biglow served in the Wisconsin State Assembly and was a Republican. He died in Mark Center, Ohio while visiting friends.
