= Delaware Township, Ohio =

Delaware Township, Ohio, may refer to:

- Delaware Township, Defiance County, Ohio
- Delaware Township, Delaware County, Ohio
- Delaware Township, Hancock County, Ohio
