= Melbern, Ohio =

Unincorporated community in Ohio, U.S.

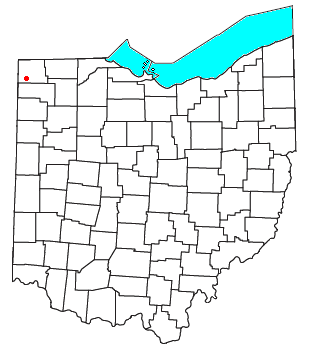
Location of Melbern, Ohio

Melbern is a small unincorporated community in western Center Township, Williams County, Ohio, United States. It is situated on County Road 9 south of County Road D.

== History ==
A post office called Melbern opened in 1866, and remained in operation until it was discontinued in 1961. First called Kansas, the present name was adopted when the post office was established.

== Geography ==
Melbern is located at 41°28′01″N 84°39′05″W and an elevation of 860 feet.

== Education ==
School age children living in Melbern attend Edgerton Local Schools.
