= Emerald Township, Ohio =

Township in Ohio, US

Emerald Township, Paulding County, Ohio
- Township
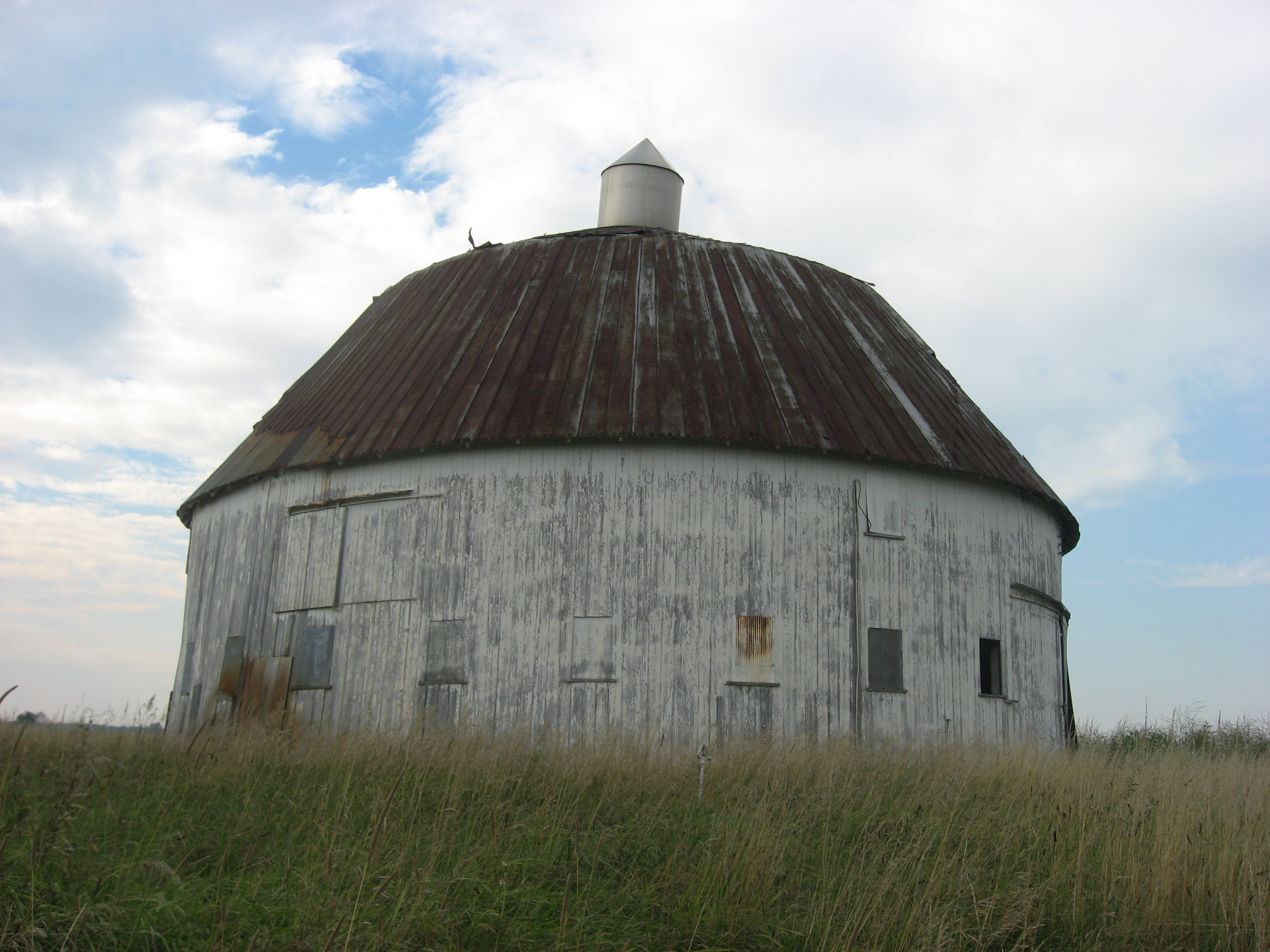
- The William Sinn Round Barn

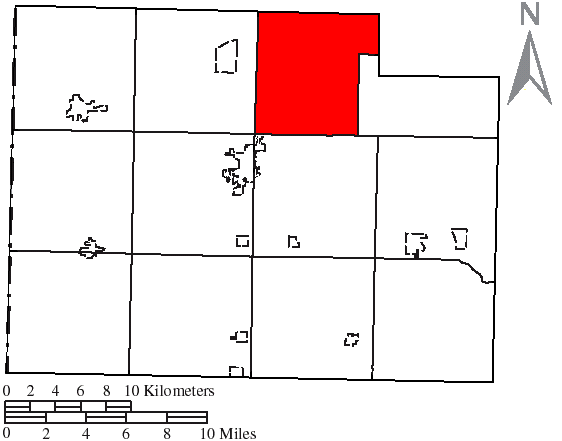
- Location of Emerald Township in Paulding County
- Coordinates: 41°12′9″N 84°31′32″W
- Country: United States
- State: Ohio
- County: Paulding

Area
  - Total: 32.8 sq mi (84.9 km^{2})
  - Land: 32.7 sq mi (84.8 km^{2})
  - Water: 0.039 sq mi (0.1 km^{2})
- Elevation: 715 ft (218 m)

Population (2020)
  - Total: 765
  - Density: 23/sq mi (9/km^{2})
- Time zone: UTC-5 (Eastern (EST))
  - Summer (DST): UTC-4 (EDT)
- FIPS code: 39-25298
- GNIS feature ID: 1086772

Emerald Township is one of the twelve townships of Paulding County, Ohio, United States. The 2020 census found 765 people in the township.

== Geography ==
Located in the northern part of the county, it borders the following townships:

- Delaware Township, Defiance County - north
- Defiance Township, Defiance County - northeast
- Auglaize Township - east
- Jackson Township - south
- Paulding Township - southwest corner
- Crane Township - west
- Mark Township, Defiance County - northwest corner

No municipalities are located in Emerald Township.

== Name and history ==
It is the only Emerald Township statewide.

== Government ==
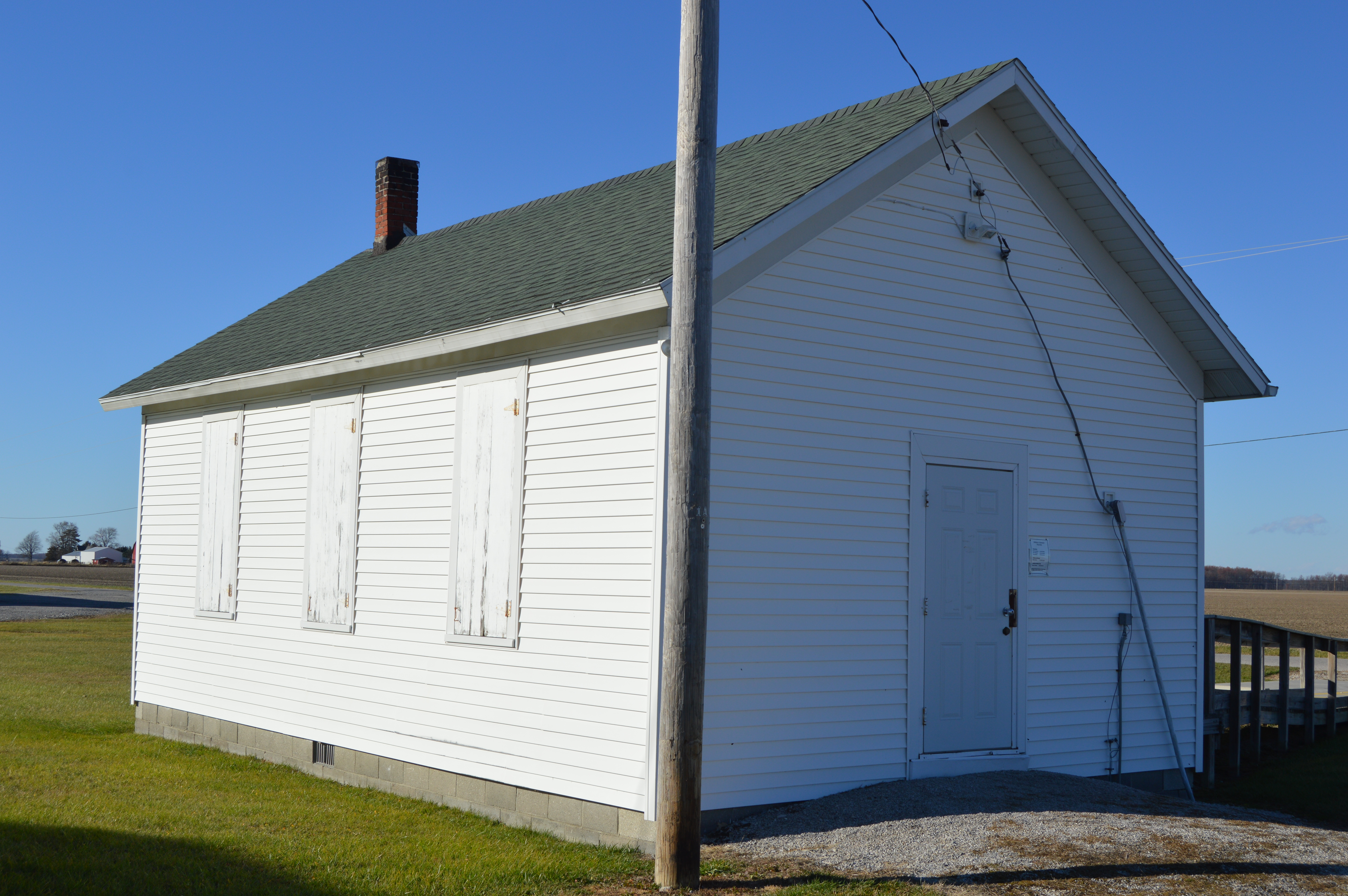
Emerald Township House

The township is governed by a three-member board of trustees, who are elected in November of odd-numbered years to a four-year term beginning on the following January 1. Two are elected in the year after the presidential election and one is elected in the year before it. There is also an elected township fiscal officer, who serves a four-year term beginning on April 1 of the year after the election, which is held in November of the year before the presidential election. Vacancies in the fiscal officership or on the board of trustees are filled by the remaining trustees.
