= Harrison Township, Paulding County, Ohio =

Township in Ohio, US

- Township
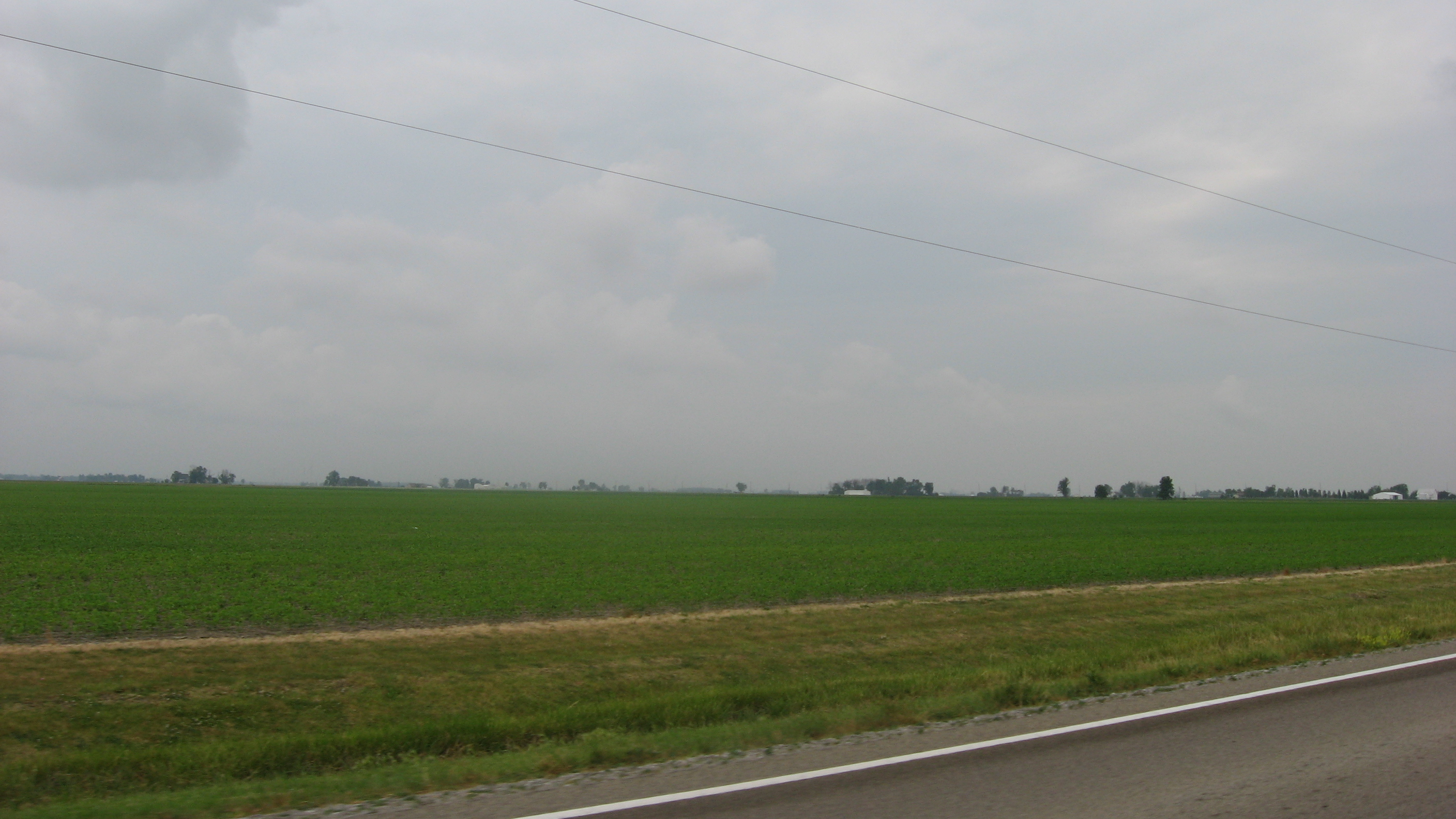
- Fields between Antwerp and Payne

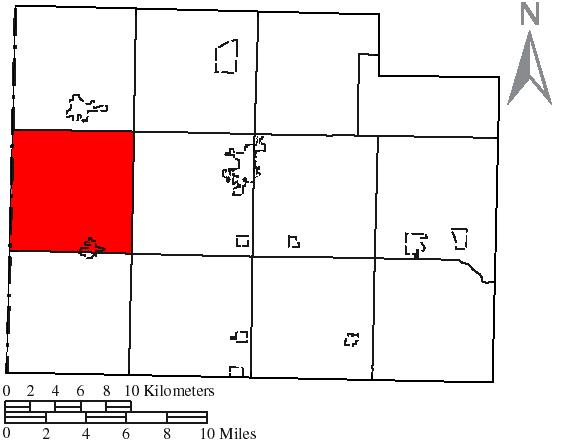
- Location of Harrison Township in Paulding County
- Coordinates: 41°6′11″N 84°44′11″W
- Country: United States
- State: Ohio
- County: Paulding

Area
  - Total: 36.2 sq mi (93.8 km^{2})
  - Land: 36.2 sq mi (93.8 km^{2})
  - Water: 0 sq mi (0.0 km^{2})
- Elevation: 745 ft (227 m)

Population (2020)
  - Total: 1,511
  - Density: 41.7/sq mi (16.1/km^{2})
- Time zone: UTC-5 (Eastern (EST))
  - Summer (DST): UTC-4 (EDT)
- FIPS code: 39-33950
- GNIS feature ID: 1086773

Harrison Township is one of the twelve townships of Paulding County, Ohio, United States. The 2020 census found 1,511 people in the township.

== Geography ==
Located in the western part of the county along the Indiana line, it borders the following townships:

- Carryall Township - north
- Crane Township - northeast corner
- Paulding Township - east
- Blue Creek Township - southeast corner
- Benton Township - south
- Jackson Township, Allen County, Indiana - southwest
- Maumee Township, Allen County, Indiana - west

Part of the village of Payne is located in southern Harrison Township on the border with Benton Township.

== Name and history ==
It is one of nineteen Harrison Townships statewide.

== Government ==
The township is governed by a three-member board of trustees, who are elected in November of odd-numbered years to a four-year term beginning on the following January 1. Two are elected in the year after the presidential election and one is elected in the year before it. There is also an elected township fiscal officer, who serves a four-year term beginning on April 1 of the year after the election, which is held in November of the year before the presidential election. Vacancies in the fiscal officership or on the board of trustees are filled by the remaining trustees.
