= Central Local School District =

School district in Ohio

Central Local School District, also known as Central Local Schools, is a school district in Defiance County, Ohio, United States. It operates three schools: Fairview High School, Fairview Middle School, and Fairview Elementary School. The district's superintendent is Alan Keesee.

== Fairview Elementary School ==
Fairview Elementary School is located on 14060 Blosser Road in rural Sherwood, Ohio. The school's principal is Amy Hammer. Fairview opened for the first time during the 2002–2003 school year, replacing Sherwood Elementary and Farmer Elementary schools as the elementary school in the Central Local School District. Go to http://www.centrallocal.org/apaches/ to learn more.
