= Center Township, Williams County, Ohio =

Township in Ohio, US

- Township
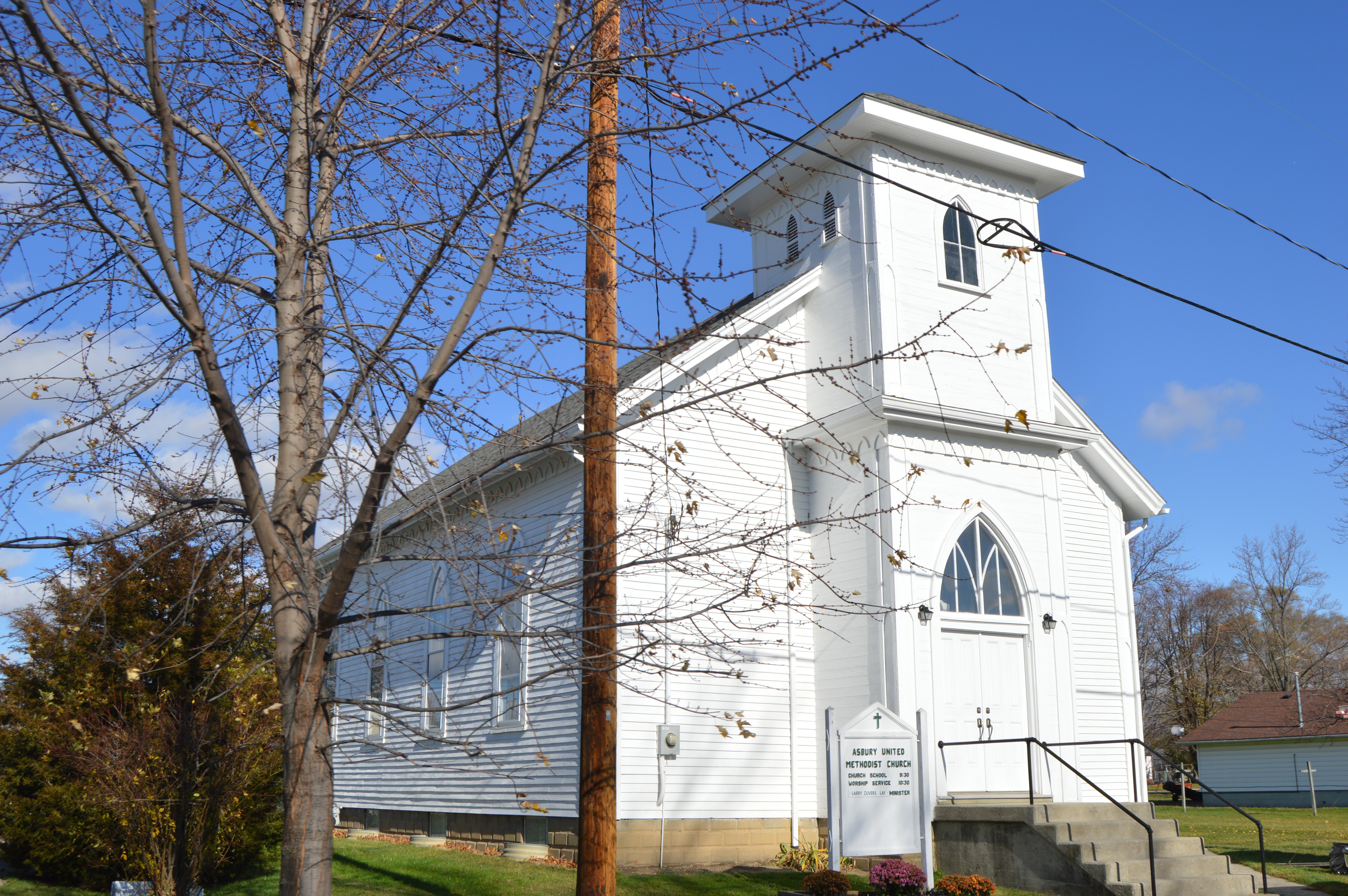
- Methodist church in Williams Center

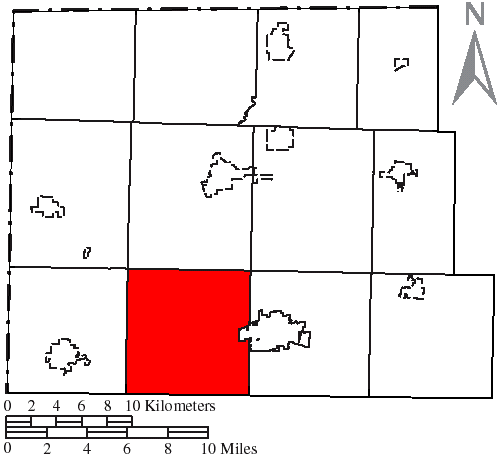
- Location of Center Township in Williams County
- Coordinates: 41°27′54″N 84°37′3″W
- Country: United States
- State: Ohio
- County: Williams

Area
  - Total: 36.1 sq mi (93.6 km^{2})
  - Land: 36.1 sq mi (93.5 km^{2})
  - Water: 0.039 sq mi (0.1 km^{2})
- Elevation: 794 ft (242 m)

Population (2020)
  - Total: 2,928
  - Density: 81/sq mi (31.3/km^{2})
- Time zone: UTC-5 (Eastern (EST))
  - Summer (DST): UTC-4 (EDT)
- FIPS code: 39-13008
- GNIS feature ID: 1087168

Center Township is one of the twelve townships of Williams County, Ohio, United States. The 2020 census found 2,928 people in the township.

== Geography ==
Located in the southern part of the county, it borders the following townships:

- Superior Township - north
- Jefferson Township - northeast corner
- Pulaski Township - east
- Washington Township, Defiance County - southeast corner
- Farmer Township, Defiance County - southwest corner
- Milford Township, Defiance County - south
- St. Joseph Township - west
- Florence Township - northwest corner

A small section of the county seat of Bryan is located in eastern Center Township, and the unincorporated communities of Melbern and Williams Center lie in the township's west and southeast respectively.

== Name and history ==
Center Township was organized in 1836, and was so named on account of its location near the geographical center of Williams County before the county was reduced in size. It is one of nine Center Townships statewide.

== Government ==
The township is governed by a three-member board of trustees, who are elected in November of odd-numbered years to a four-year term beginning on the following January 1. Two are elected in the year after the presidential election and one is elected in the year before it. There is also an elected township fiscal officer, who serves a four-year term beginning on April 1 of the year after the election, which is held in November of the year before the presidential election. Vacancies in the fiscal officership or on the board of trustees are filled by the remaining trustees.
