= Mark Township, Defiance County, Ohio =

Township in Ohio, US

- Township
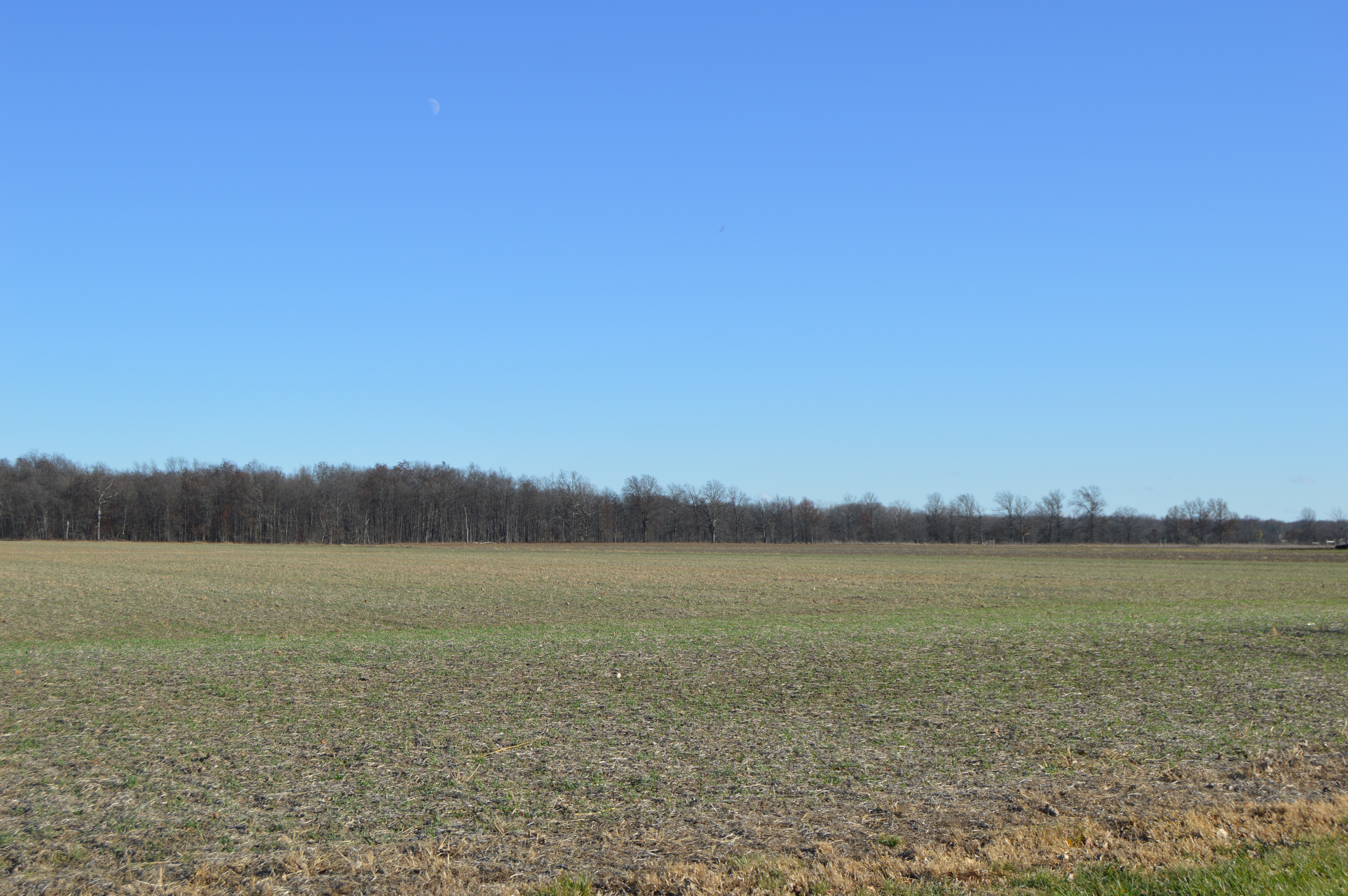
- Along Openlander Road southwest of Sherwood

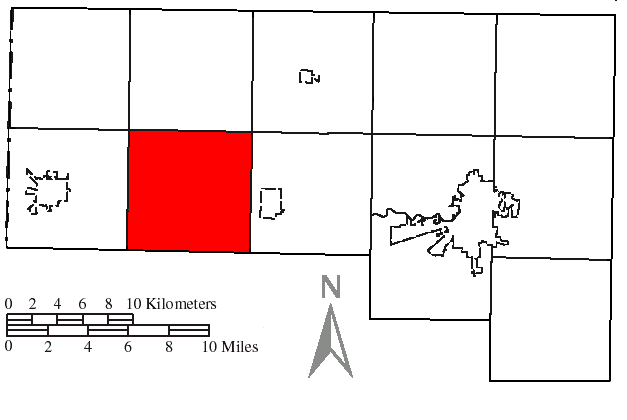
- Location of Mark Township in Defiance County
- Coordinates: 41°17′28″N 84°37′45″W
- Country: United States
- State: Ohio
- County: Defiance

Area
  - Total: 36.6 sq mi (94.9 km^{2})
  - Land: 36.6 sq mi (94.9 km^{2})
  - Water: 0 sq mi (0.0 km^{2})
- Elevation: 725 ft (221 m)

Population (2020)
  - Total: 902
  - Density: 24.6/sq mi (9.50/km^{2})
- Time zone: UTC-5 (Eastern (EST))
  - Summer (DST): UTC-4 (EDT)
- FIPS code: 39-47852
- GNIS feature ID: 1086035

Mark Township is one of the twelve townships of Defiance County, Ohio, United States. The 2020 census found 902 people in the township.

== Geography ==
Located in the southwestern part of the county, it borders the following townships:

- Farmer Township - north
- Washington Township - northeast corner
- Delaware Township - east
- Emerald Township, Paulding County - southeast corner
- Crane Township, Paulding County - south
- Carryall Township, Paulding County - southwest corner
- Hicksville Township - west
- Milford Township - northwest corner

No municipalities are located in Mark Township, although the unincorporated community of Mark Center is located in the township's center.

== Name and history ==
Mark Township was established in 1851, and named for Mark Kenton, an early settler. It is the only Mark Township statewide.

== Government ==
The township is governed by a three-member board of trustees, who are elected in November of odd-numbered years to a four-year term beginning on the following January 1. Two are elected in the year after the presidential election and one is elected in the year before it. There is also an elected township fiscal officer, who serves a four-year term beginning on April 1 of the year after the election, which is held in November of the year before the presidential election. Vacancies in the fiscal officership or on the board of trustees are filled by the remaining trustees.

== Transportation ==
The most important highway in Mark Township is State Route 18, which travels from east to west through the center of the township.
