= Farmer Township, Ohio =

Township in Ohio, US

Farmer Township, Defiance County, Ohio
- Township
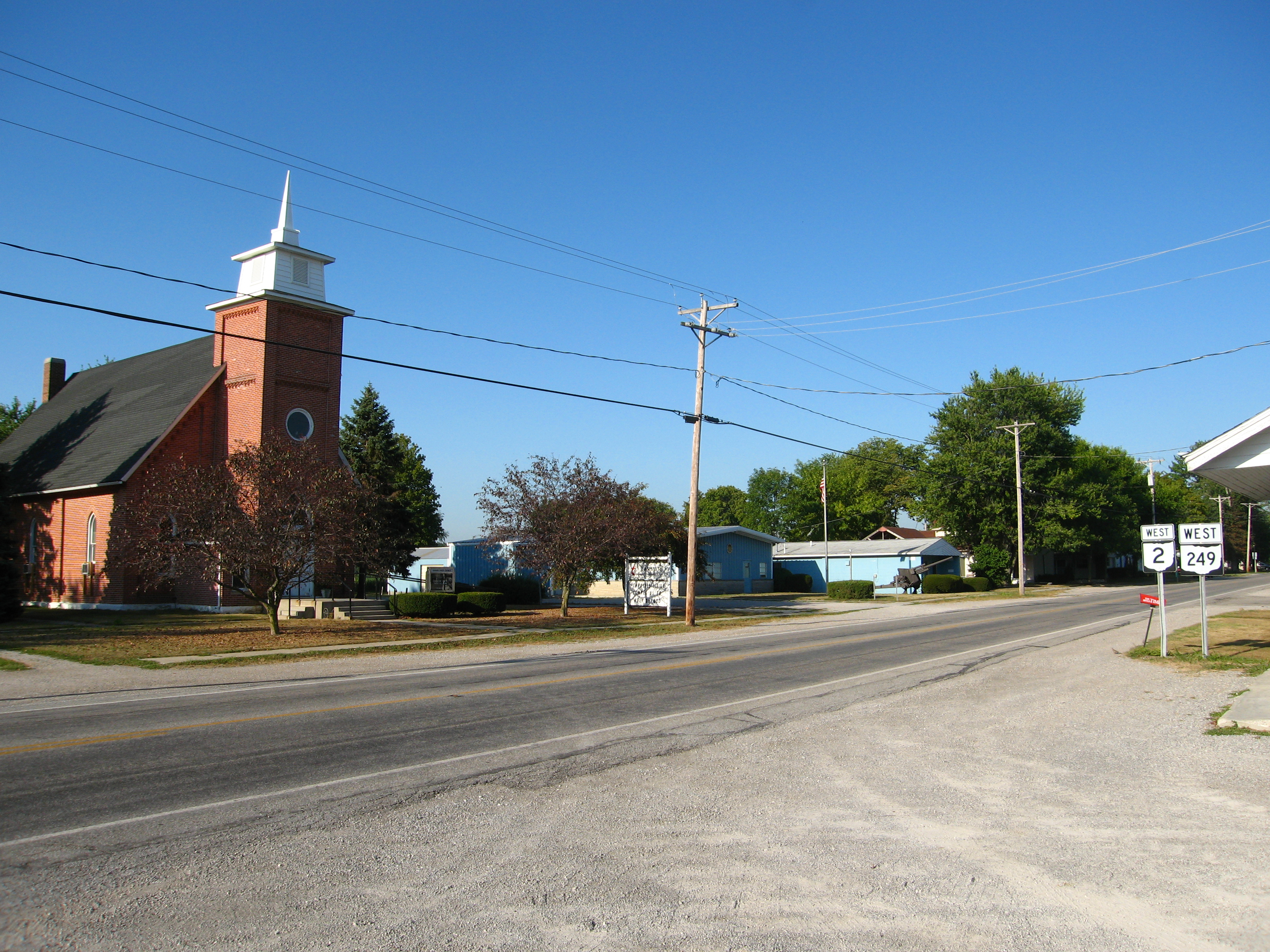
- Church and houses in Farmer

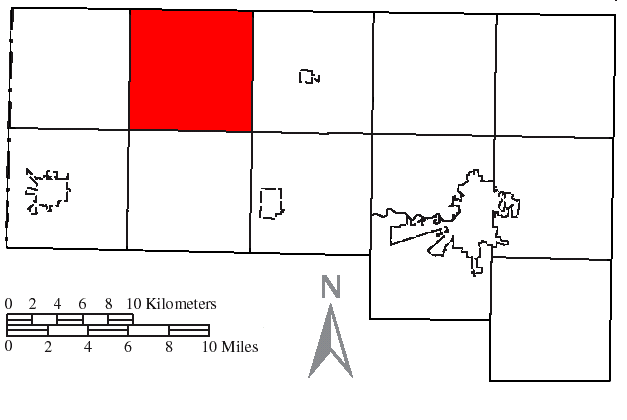
- Location of Farmer Township in Defiance County
- Coordinates: 41°23′9″N 84°38′38″W
- Country: United States
- State: Ohio
- County: Defiance

Area
  - Total: 36.54 sq mi (94.65 km^{2})
  - Land: 36.52 sq mi (94.58 km^{2})
  - Water: 0.023 sq mi (0.06 km^{2})
- Elevation: 745 ft (227 m)

Population (2020)
  - Total: 892
  - Density: 24.4/sq mi (9.43/km^{2})
- Time zone: UTC-5 (Eastern (EST))
  - Summer (DST): UTC-4 (EDT)
- ZIP code: 43520
- Area code: 419
- FIPS code: 39-26614
- GNIS feature ID: 1086032

Farmer Township is one of the twelve townships of Defiance County, Ohio, United States. The 2020 census found 892 people in the township.

== Geography ==
Located in the northwestern part of the county, it borders the following townships:

- Center Township, Williams County - north
- Pulaski Township, Williams County - northeast corner
- Washington Township - east
- Delaware Township - southeast corner
- Mark Township - south
- Hicksville Township - southwest corner
- Milford Township - west
- St. Joseph Township, Williams County - northwest corner

No municipalities are located in Farmer Township, although the unincorporated community of Farmer is located in the township's center.

== Name and history ==
Farmer Township was originally called Lost Creek Township, and under the latter name was organized in 1836. The present name honors Nathan Farmer, an early settler. It is the only Farmer Township statewide.

== Government ==
The township is governed by a three-member board of trustees, who are elected in November of odd-numbered years to a four-year term beginning on the following January 1. Two are elected in the year after the presidential election and one is elected in the year before it. There is also an elected township fiscal officer, who serves a four-year term beginning on April 1 of the year after the election, which is held in November of the year before the presidential election. Vacancies in the fiscal officership or on the board of trustees are filled by the remaining trustees.

== Transportation ==
Two significant highways in Farmer Township are State Route 2, which travels from northeast to southwest through the western half of the township; and State Route 249, which travels east–west through the center of the township and is concurrent with State Route 2 for a short distance.
