= Cecil, Ohio =

- Village
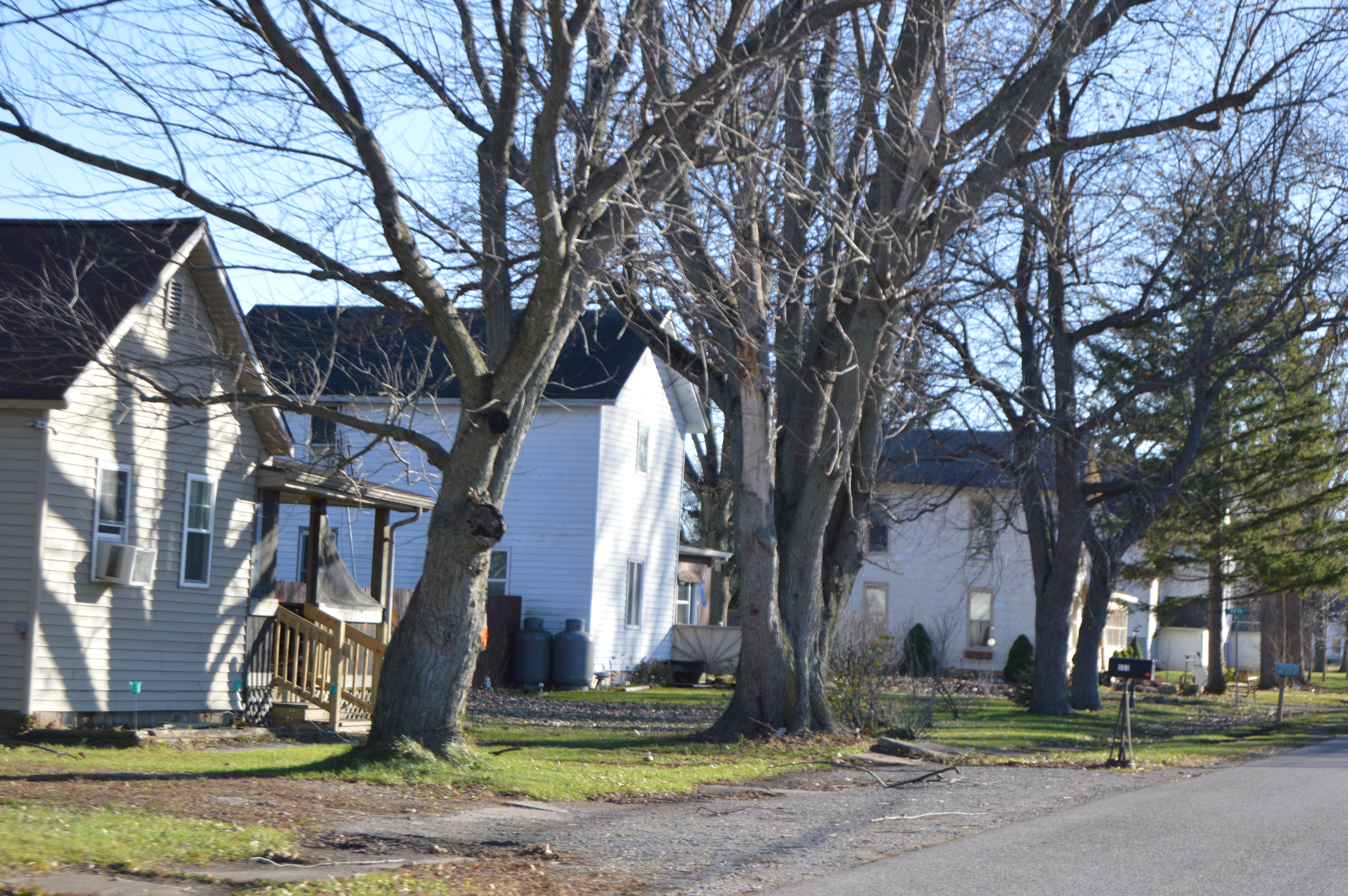
- Houses on Main Street

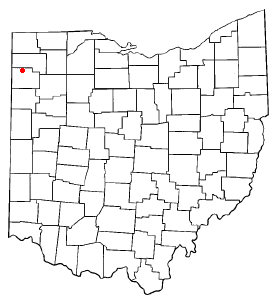
- Location of Cecil, Ohio

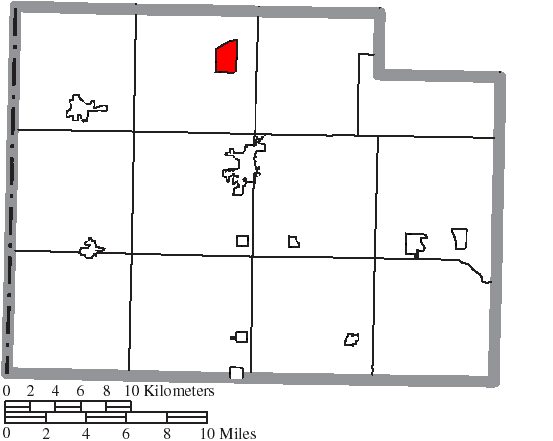
- Location of Cecil in Paulding County
- Coordinates: 41°13′09″N 84°36′06″W
- Country: United States
- State: Ohio
- County: Paulding
- Township: Crane

Area
  - Total: 1.46 sq mi (3.79 km^{2})
  - Land: 1.46 sq mi (3.78 km^{2})
  - Water: 0 sq mi (0.00 km^{2})
- Elevation: 722 ft (220 m)

Population (2020)
  - Total: 146
  - Estimate (2023): 140
  - Density: 99.9/sq mi (38.58/km^{2})
- Time zone: UTC-5 (Eastern (EST))
  - Summer (DST): UTC-4 (EDT)
- ZIP code: 45821
- Area code: 419
- FIPS code: 39-12700
- GNIS feature ID: 2397578

Cecil (/ˈsiːsəl/ SEE-səl) is a village in Paulding County, Ohio, United States. The population was 146 at the 2020 census.

== History ==
A post office with the name Crane was established December 31, 1866; the name was changed to Cecil with effect from June 8, 1868.

Cecil was named for a railroad official.

== Geography ==
According to the United States Census Bureau, the village has a total area of 1.46 square miles (3.78 km^{2}), all land.

== Demographics ==
Historical population
Census	Pop.	Note	%±
1880	169		—
1890	348		105.9%
1900	326		−6.3%
1910	290		−11.0%
1920	263		−9.3%
1930	250		−4.9%
1940	266		6.4%
1950	266		0.0%
1960	288		8.3%
1970	295		2.4%
1980	267		−9.5%
1990	249		−6.7%
2000	216		−13.3%
2010	188		−13.0%
2020	146		−22.3%
2023 (est.)	140	▼	−4.1%
U.S. Decennial Census

=== 2010 census ===
As of the census of 2010, there were 188 people, 71 households, and 47 families living in the village. The population density was 128.8 inhabitants per square mile (49.7/km^{2}). There were 85 housing units at an average density of 58.2 per square mile (22.5/km^{2}). The racial makeup of the village was 94.7% White, 2.7% African American, 0.5% Native American, and 2.1% from two or more races. Hispanic or Latino of any race were 4.8% of the population.

There were 71 households, of which 38.0% had children under the age of 18 living with them, 43.7% were married couples living together, 14.1% had a female householder with no husband present, 8.5% had a male householder with no wife present, and 33.8% were non-families. 25.4% of all households were made up of individuals, and 7% had someone living alone who was 65 years of age or older. The average household size was 2.65 and the average family size was 3.13.

The median age in the village was 37.5 years. 27.7% of residents were under the age of 18; 9% were between the ages of 18 and 24; 29.7% were from 25 to 44; 24% were from 45 to 64; and 9.6% were 65 years of age or older. The gender makeup of the village was 54.8% male and 45.2% female.

=== 2000 census ===
As of the census of 2000, there were 216 people, 77 households, and 48 families living in the village. The population density was 147.2 inhabitants per square mile (56.8/km^{2}). There were 81 housing units at an average density of 55.2 per square mile (21.3/km^{2}). The racial makeup of the village was 97.22% White, 0.93% Native American, 0.93% from other races, and 0.93% from two or more races. Hispanic or Latino of any race were 1.39% of the population.

There were 77 households, out of which 29.9% had children under the age of 18 living with them, 44.2% were married couples living together, 10.4% had a female householder with no husband present, and 36.4% were non-families. 29.9% of all households were made up of individuals, and 7.8% had someone living alone who was 65 years of age or older. The average household size was 2.81 and the average family size was 3.35.

In the village, the population was spread out, with 29.6% under the age of 18, 6.9% from 18 to 24, 30.6% from 25 to 44, 22.7% from 45 to 64, and 10.2% who were 65 years of age or older. The median age was 36 years. For every 100 females there were 120.4 males. For every 100 females age 18 and over, there were 133.8 males.

The median income for a household in the village was $28,393, and the median income for a family was $28,000. Males had a median income of $28,333 versus $11,667 for females. The per capita income for the village was $12,687. About 20.0% of families and 23.4% of the population were below the poverty line, including 32.8% of those under the age of 18 and none of those 65 or over.
