= St. Joseph Township, Williams County, Ohio =

Township in Ohio, US

- Township
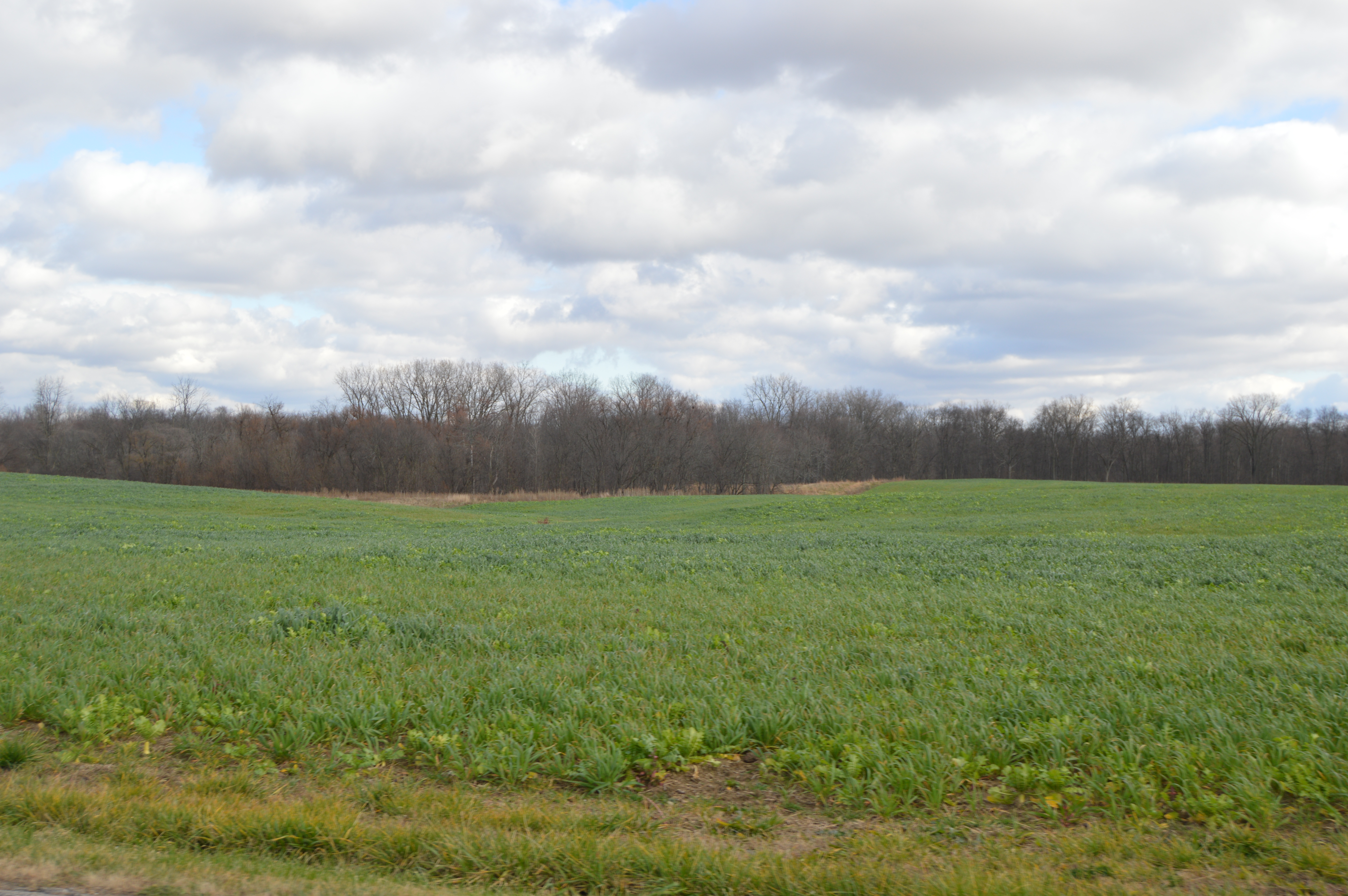
- Countryside just north of Edgerton

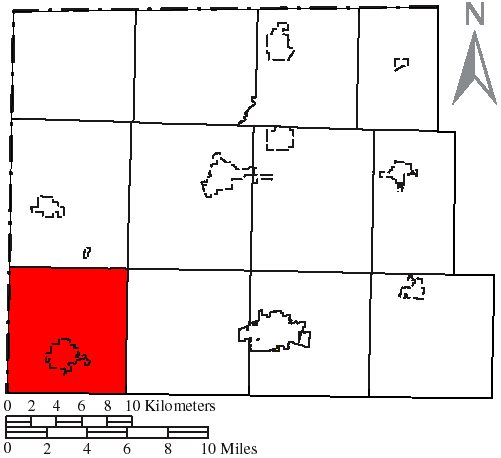
- Location of St. Joseph Township in Williams County
- Coordinates: 41°27′35″N 84°44′48″W
- Country: United States
- State: Ohio
- County: Williams

Area
  - Total: 35.1 sq mi (91.0 km^{2})
  - Land: 35.1 sq mi (90.8 km^{2})
  - Water: 0.077 sq mi (0.2 km^{2})
- Elevation: 833 ft (254 m)

Population (2020)
  - Total: 2,666
  - Density: 76/sq mi (29.4/km^{2})
- Time zone: UTC-5 (Eastern (EST))
  - Summer (DST): UTC-4 (EDT)
- FIPS code: 39-69638
- GNIS feature ID: 1087175

St. Joseph Township is one of the twelve townships of Williams County, Ohio, United States. The 2020 census found 2,666 people in the township.

== Geography ==
Located in the southwestern corner of the county along the Indiana state line, St. Joseph Township borders the following townships:

- Florence Township - north
- Superior Township - northeast corner
- Center Township - east
- Farmer Township, Defiance County - southeast corner
- Milford Township, Defiance County - south
- Stafford Township, DeKalb County, Indiana - southwest
- Troy Township, DeKalb County, Indiana - west

The village of Edgerton is located in the southern part of the township. The St. Joseph River flows north to south through it.

== Name and history ==
It is the only St. Joseph Township statewide.

== Government ==
The township is governed by a three-member board of trustees, who are elected in November of odd-numbered years to a four-year term beginning on the following January 1. Two are elected in the year after the presidential election and one is elected in the year before it. There is also an elected township fiscal officer, who serves a four-year term beginning on April 1 of the year after the election, which is held in November of the year before the presidential election. Vacancies in the fiscal officership or on the board of trustees are filled by the remaining trustees.
