= Pulaski Township, Williams County, Ohio =

Township in Ohio, US

- Township
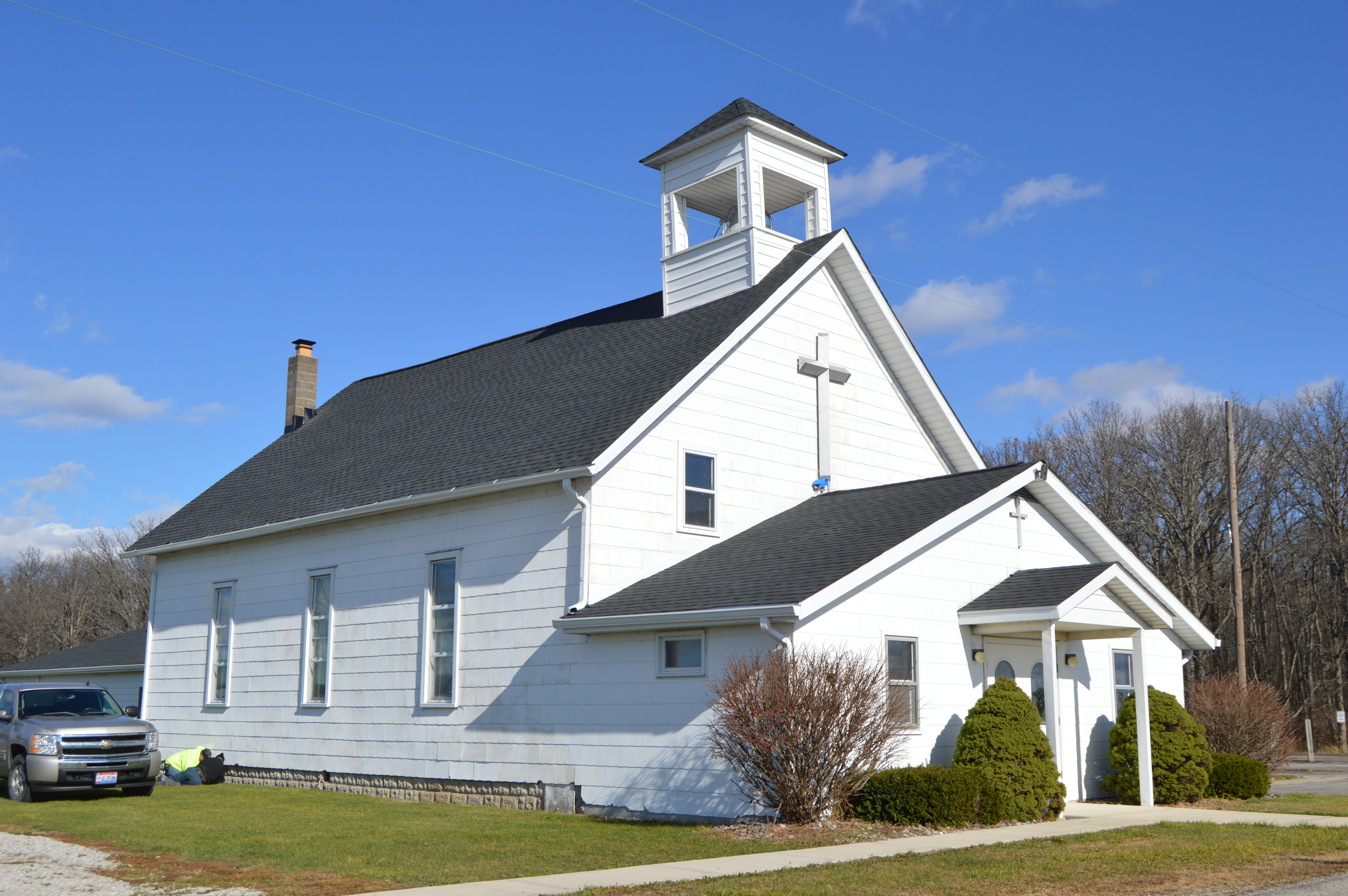
- Union Chapel Church of God in the southeastern corner of the township

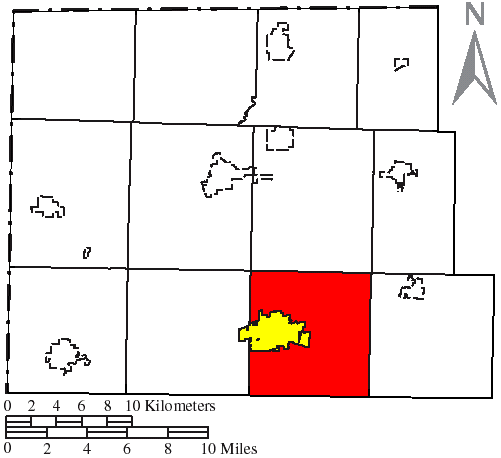
- Location of Pulaski Township in Williams County
- Coordinates: 41°28′28″N 84°31′11″W
- Country: United States
- State: Ohio
- County: Williams

Area
  - Total: 31.5 sq mi (81.5 km^{2})
  - Land: 31.5 sq mi (81.5 km^{2})
  - Water: 0.039 sq mi (0.1 km^{2})
- Elevation: 745 ft (227 m)

Population (2020)
  - Total: 2,446
  - Density: 77.7/sq mi (30.0/km^{2})
- Time zone: UTC-5 (Eastern (EST))
  - Summer (DST): UTC-4 (EDT)
- FIPS code: 39-64920
- GNIS feature ID: 1087174

Pulaski Township is one of the twelve townships of Williams County, Ohio, United States. The 2020 census found 2,446 people in the township.

== Geography ==
Located in the southern part of the county, it borders the following townships:

- Jefferson Township - north
- Brady Township - northeast corner
- Springfield Township - east
- Tiffin Township, Defiance County - southeast corner
- Washington Township, Defiance County - south
- Farmer Township, Defiance County - southwest corner
- Center Township - west
- Superior Township - northwest corner

Most of Bryan, the county seat and only city of Williams County, is located in western Pulaski Township, and the census-designated place of Pulaski lies in the township's north.

== Name and history ==
The township was named for Count Casimir Pulaski, an American Revolutionary War soldier. It is the only Pulaski Township statewide.

== Government ==
The township is governed by a three-member board of trustees, who are elected in November of odd-numbered years to a four-year term beginning on the following January 1. Two are elected in the year after the presidential election, and one is elected in the year before it. There is also an elected township fiscal officer, who serves a four-year term beginning on April 1 of the year after the election, which is held in November of the year before the presidential election. Vacancies in the fiscal officership or on the board of trustees are filled by the remaining trustees.
