= Edgerton, Indiana =

- Unincorporated community
- Location within Indiana Location within the United States
- Coordinates: 41°04′36″N 84°48′22″W
- Country: United States
- State: Indiana
- County: Allen
- Township: Jackson
- Established: 1889
- Named after: Joseph K. Edgerton
- Elevation: 755 ft (230 m)
- Time zone: UTC-5 (Eastern (EST))
  - Summer (DST): UTC-4 (EDT)
- ZIP code: 46797
- Area code: 260
- GNIS feature ID: 452039

Edgerton is an unincorporated community in Jackson Township, Allen County, in the U.S. state of Indiana.

== History ==
Edgerton was founded in 1889 after the railroad was extended to that point. A post office was established at Edgerton in 1890, and remained in operation until it was discontinued in 1954.

Edgerton was named for Joseph K. Edgerton. He was born in Vergennes, Vermont in 1818 and moved to Fort Wayne in 1844. A lawyer and politician, in 1862 he was elected as a Representative in the U.S. congress for one term. Mr. Edgerton was also a director and/or president of three different railroads serving the area. He had invested in large parcels of land in Ohio, and also along the Ohio line in Indiana, in townships east of Fort Wayne. There, he had purchased what was considered condemned swamp land which still had stands of virgin timber because it was too wet and difficult to do logging. Following his death in 1893, two Anspach brothers - John and George - from Oak Harbor, Ohio, purchased several hundred acres of that land bordering Ohio from Mr. Edgerton's estate, managed by his sons Edward and Clement.

The Anspach brothers then built homes, a sawmill, a tile factory, and a general store there, thus building the economic base of the new village of Edgerton. The tile factory produced drainage tile that was utilized to drain the swampy land to facilitate its clearing and occupation. Their brother Allen Anspach and other siblings remained in Oak Harbor, where he ran the family's existing lumber company. The Edgerton house built by George Anspach is still an active residence there, facing the railroad tracks. His daughter, Edith, was born in Oak Harbor about 1881 and, after her 1899 graduation from Oak Harbor School, moved to her parents' home in Edgerton. She then occupied the house after her marriage to George Waldrop, of Owen County, KY, who had come there to find work during the depression following the Spanish–American War. George Anspach and wife Mary moved to a new home on Creighton Avenue in Fort Wayne around 1908, leaving the Edgerton house to Edith and her husband George. Edith and George Waldrop then also moved to another residence on Creighton Avenue around 1918. About half of their ten children were born in Edgerton, half in Fort Wayne.
