= Crane Township, Paulding County, Ohio =

Township in Ohio, US

- Township
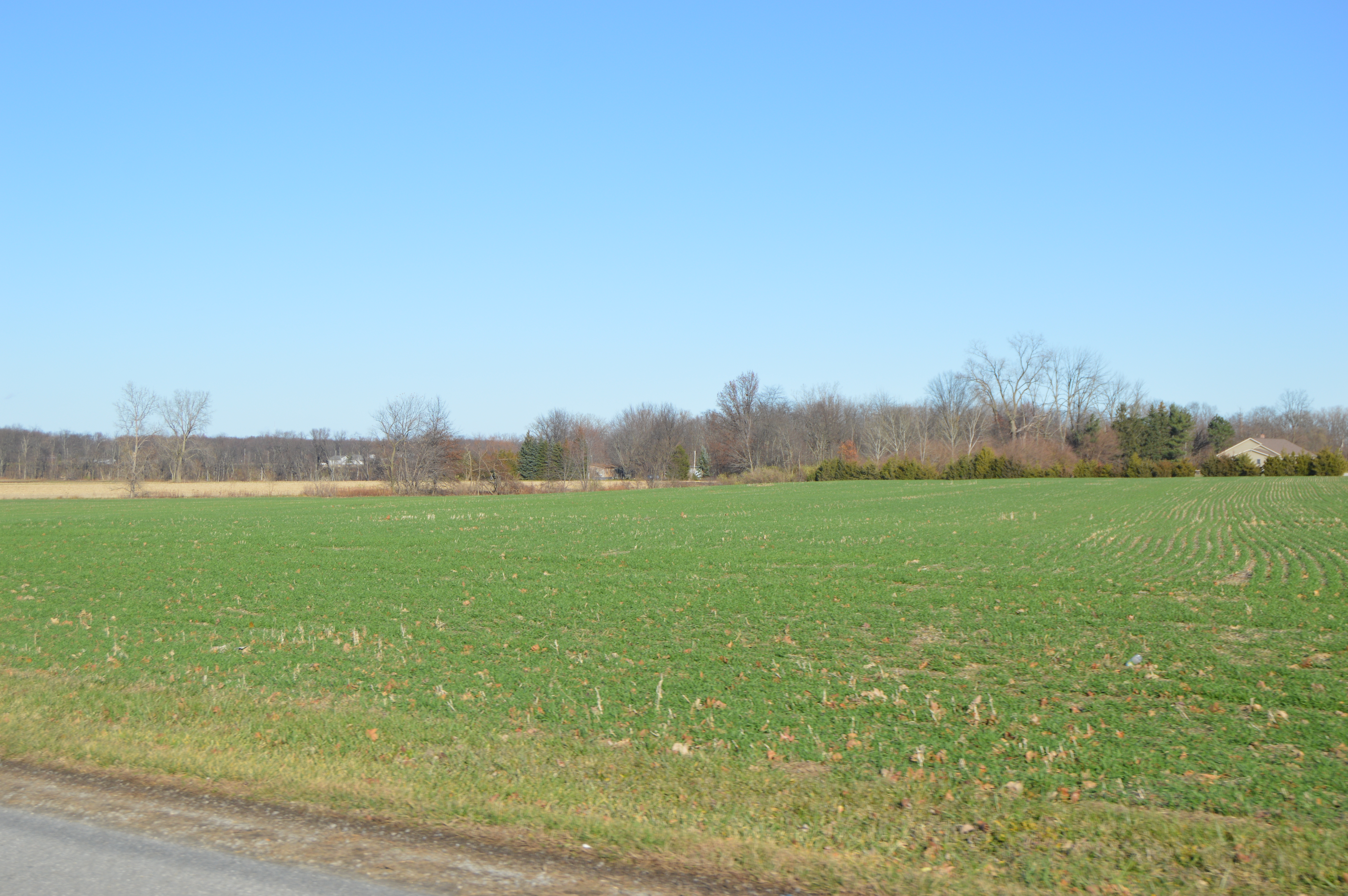
- Farmland between Cecil and the Maumee River

- Flag

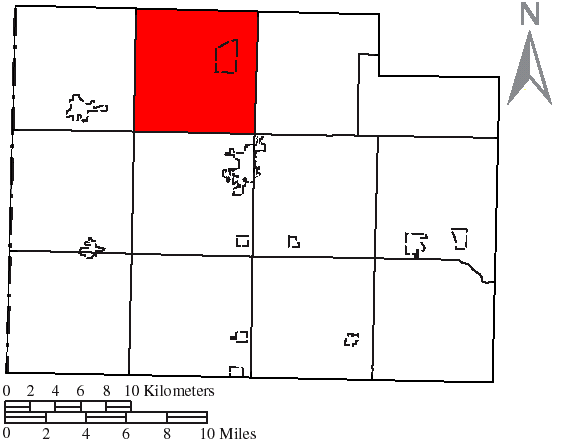
- Location of Crane Township in Paulding County
- Coordinates: 41°12′36″N 84°37′30″W
- Country: United States
- State: Ohio
- County: Paulding

Area
  - Total: 36.5 sq mi (94.5 km^{2})
  - Land: 36.0 sq mi (93.2 km^{2})
  - Water: 0.50 sq mi (1.3 km^{2})
- Elevation: 719 ft (219 m)

Population (2020)
  - Total: 1,253
  - Density: 35/sq mi (13.4/km^{2})
- Time zone: UTC-5 (Eastern (EST))
  - Summer (DST): UTC-4 (EDT)
- FIPS code: 39-19176
- GNIS feature ID: 1086771
- Website: https://www.cranetwppcohio.gov/

Crane Township is one of the twelve townships of Paulding County, Ohio, United States. The 2020 census found 1,253 people in the township.

== Geography ==
Crane Township is situated in the northeastern part of Paulding County, bordering Defiance County to the east. The Maumee River, designated an Ohio Scenic River, flows through the township and was historically important for transportation and settlement. It borders the following townships:

- Mark Township, Defiance County - north
- Delaware Township, Defiance County - northeast corner
- Emerald Township - east
- Jackson Township - southeast corner
- Paulding Township - south
- Harrison Township - southwest corner
- Carryall Township - west
- Hicksville Township, Defiance County - northwest corner

The village of Cecil is located in northeastern Crane Township.

== Name and history ==
Crane Township was established in 1825, named for Oliver Crane, an early settler and community leader. The first European-American settlers arrived around 1823, traveling by pirogues or dugout canoes on the Maumee River, which was the primary transportation route before roads were established.

One of the earliest settlements in the township was Cranesville, founded near the Maumee River. This community became a vital trading post and the location of the first post office, established in 1829, with Oliver Crane serving as postmaster. Horatio Nelson Curtis was another key figure in the township’s early history; he built a home that still stands today and served as Justice of the Peace. No other evidence of Cranesville remains.

Another early Crane Township settlement was New Rochester, laid out in 1835 on the south bank of the Maumee River. Thanks to its prime location, the settlement became a stop on the stagecoach line connecting Toledo to Fort Wayne. The coach route followed what is now County Road 424 (formerly U.S. Highway 24), with New Rochester serving as a relay station where fresh horses were brought in for the journey. New Rochester thrived briefly, becoming the first county seat in 1839. Today, the site is occupied by New Rochester Park, which is maintained by the Paulding County Park District. In 2025, a historical marker was installed in the park as part of the Crane Township bicentennial celebration to commemorate the town's legacy.

During the mid-19th century, transportation and industry played a critical role in the township’s development. The Wabash & Erie Canal, which passed through the township along what is now Road 180 (Canal Road), facilitated trade and travel. The township was also home to Paulding Furnace, a company town established in 1864 to support an iron smelting operation. However, after the Reservoir War of the 1887, the furnace ceased operations, and the community disappeared.

Other early settlements include Henpeck and Knoxdale. No remnants of either community remain.

The late 19th century brought the railroad era, leading to the growth of Cecil, the township’s only incorporated village. Founded in 1871, Cecil developed as a railroad hub with two major lines—the Wabash Railroad and the Cincinnati Northern Railroad—running through it.

Statewide, the only other Crane Township is located in Wyandot County.

== Government ==
The township is governed by a three-member board of trustees, who are elected in November of odd-numbered years to a four-year term beginning on the following January 1. Two are elected in the year after the presidential election and one is elected in the year before it. There is also an elected township fiscal officer, who serves a four-year term beginning on April 1 of the year after the election, which is held in November of the year before the presidential election. Vacancies in the fiscal officership or on the board of trustees are filled by the remaining trustees.
