= Milford Township, Defiance County, Ohio =

Township in Ohio, US

- Township
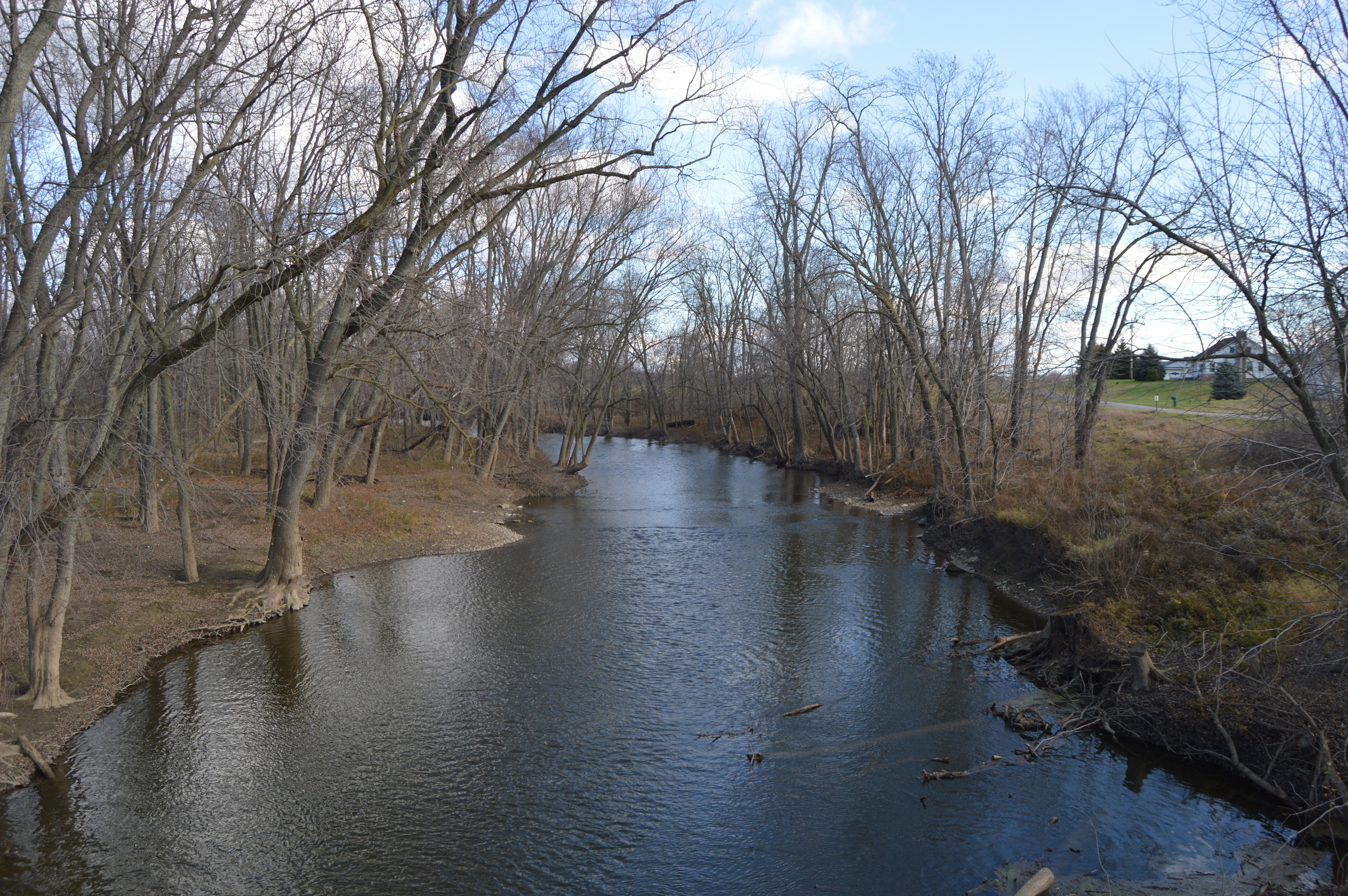
- The St. Joseph River near the Williams County line

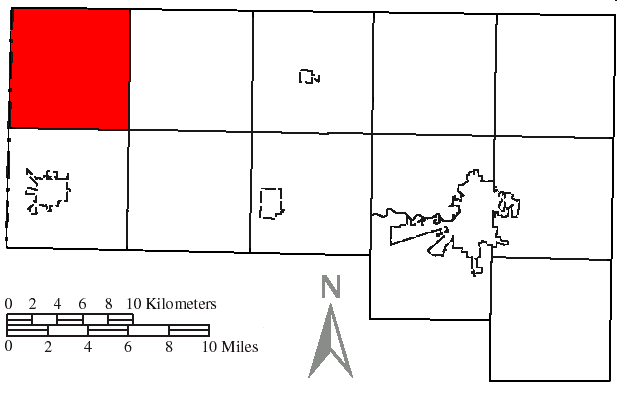
- Location of Milford Township in Defiance County
- Coordinates: 41°23′22″N 84°45′28″W
- Country: United States
- State: Ohio
- County: Defiance

Area
  - Total: 35.4 sq mi (91.8 km^{2})
  - Land: 35.4 sq mi (91.6 km^{2})
  - Water: 0.039 sq mi (0.1 km^{2})
- Elevation: 863 ft (263 m)

Population (2020)
  - Total: 1,120
  - Density: 31.7/sq mi (12.2/km^{2})
- Time zone: UTC-5 (Eastern (EST))
  - Summer (DST): UTC-4 (EDT)
- FIPS code: 39-50190
- GNIS feature ID: 1086036

Milford Township is one of the twelve townships of Defiance County, Ohio, United States. The 2020 census found 1,120 people in the township.

== Geography ==
Located in the northwestern corner of the county along the Indiana line, it borders the following townships:

- St. Joseph Township, Williams County - north
- Center Township, Williams County - northeast corner
- Farmer Township - east
- Mark Township - southeast corner
- Hicksville Township - south
- Newville Township, DeKalb County, Indiana - southwest
- Stafford Township, DeKalb County, Indiana - west

No municipalities are located in Milford Township.

== Name and history ==
Milford Township was established in 1837. Statewide, other Milford Townships are located in Butler and Knox counties.

== Government ==
The township is governed by a three-member board of trustees, who are elected in November of odd-numbered years to a four-year term beginning on the following January 1. Two are elected in the year after the presidential election and one is elected in the year before it. There is also an elected township fiscal officer, who serves a four-year term beginning on April 1 of the year after the election, which is held in November of the year before the presidential election. Vacancies in the fiscal officership or on the board of trustees are filled by the remaining trustees.

== Transportation ==
Two significant highways in Milford Township are State Route 49, which travels from north to south, and State Route 249, which travels from east to west. They meet in the center of the township.
