= Farmer, Ohio =

- Unincorporated community
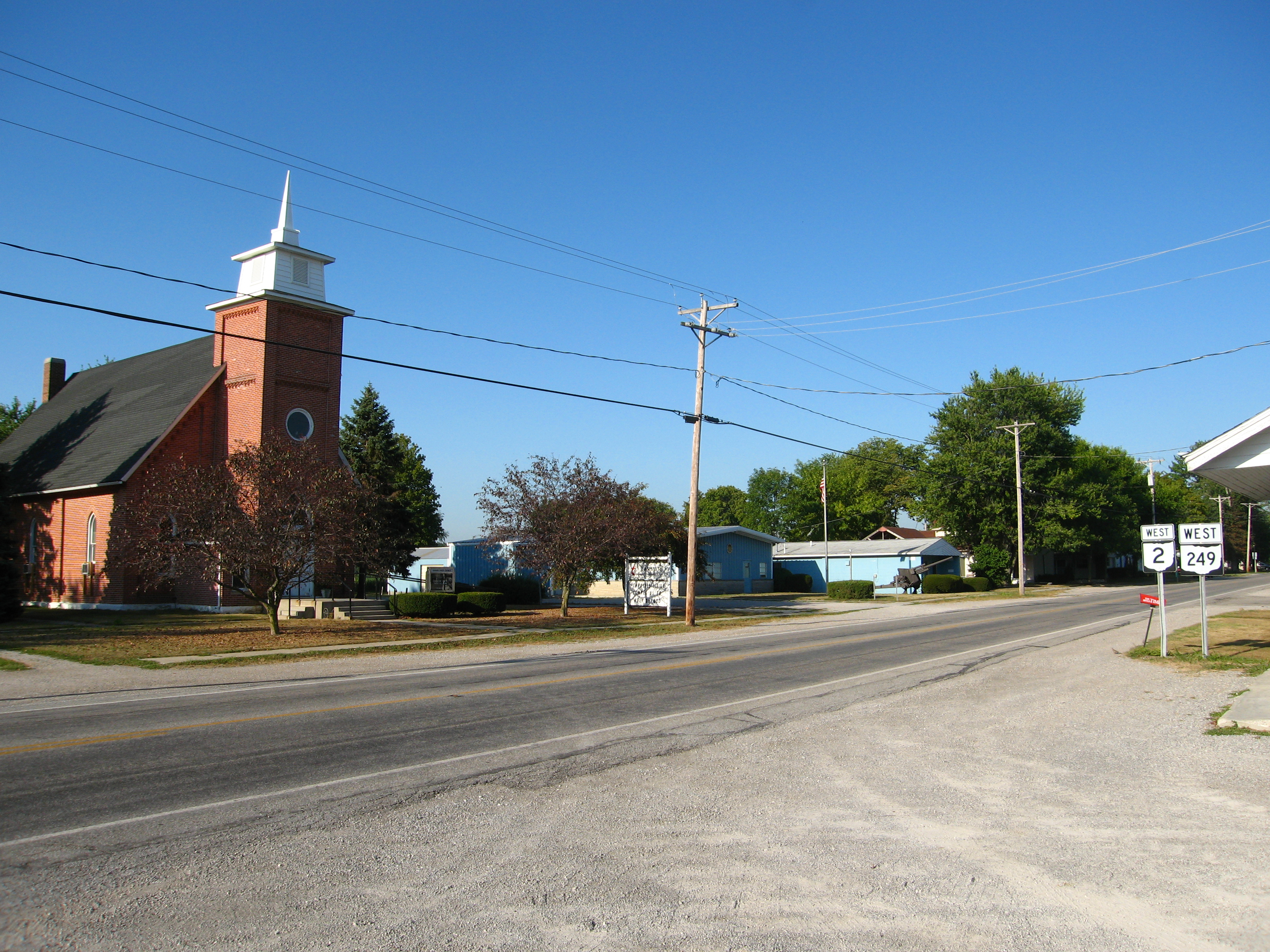
- Farmer

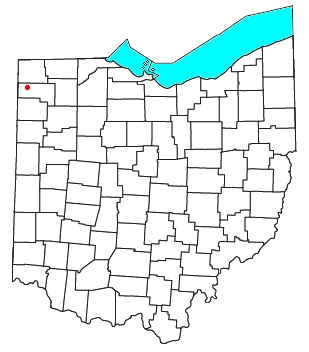
- Location of Farmer
- Coordinates: 41°22′59″N 84°37′50″W
- Country: United States
- State: Ohio
- County: Defiance
- Elevation: 748 ft (228 m)
- Time zone: UTC-5 (Eastern (EST))
  - Summer (DST): UTC-4 (EDT)
- ZIP code: 43520
- Area code: 419
- GNIS feature ID: 1064639

Farmer is an unincorporated community in central Farmer Township, Defiance County, Ohio, United States. It has a post office with the ZIP code 43520. It is located at the intersection of State Routes 2 and 249.

== History ==
Farmer was named for Nathaniel Farmer, an early settler.

== Notable ==
- Abe L. Biglow, businessman, educator, and member of the Wisconsin State Assembly
- William P. Richardson, co-founder and first Dean of Brooklyn Law School
