= Delaware Township, Defiance County, Ohio =

Township in Ohio, US

- Township
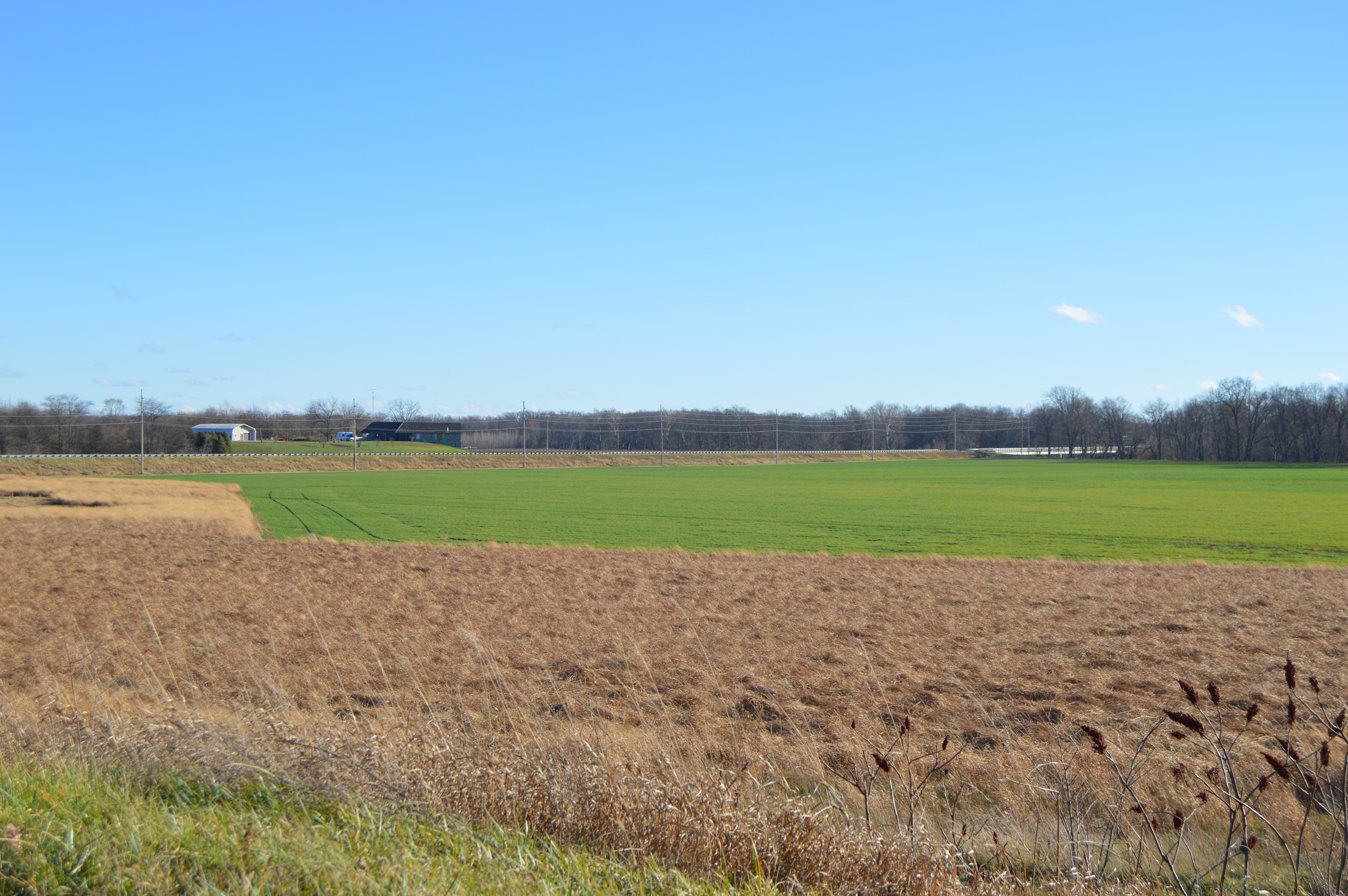
- Fields southeast of Sherwood

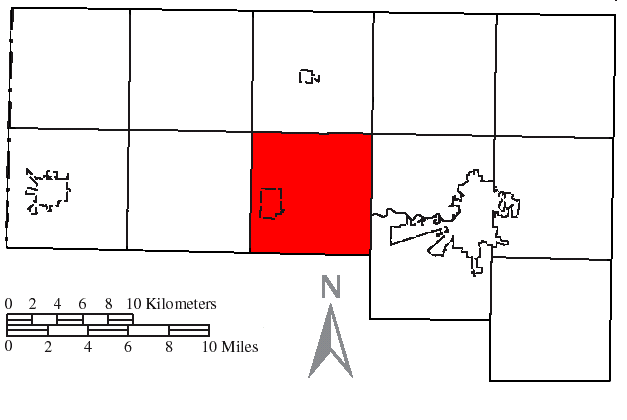
- Location of Delaware Township in Defiance County
- Coordinates: 41°17′58″N 84°31′50″W
- Country: United States
- State: Ohio
- County: Defiance

Area
  - Total: 36.0 sq mi (93.2 km^{2})
  - Land: 35.5 sq mi (92.0 km^{2})
  - Water: 0.46 sq mi (1.2 km^{2})
- Elevation: 709 ft (216 m)

Population (2020)
  - Total: 2,030
  - Density: 57.1/sq mi (22.1/km^{2})
- Time zone: UTC-5 (Eastern (EST))
  - Summer (DST): UTC-4 (EDT)
- FIPS code: 39-21420
- GNIS feature ID: 1086031

Delaware Township is one of the twelve townships of Defiance County, Ohio, United States. The 2020 census found 2,030 people in the township.

== Geography ==
Located in the central part of the county, it borders the following townships:

- Washington Township - north
- Tiffin Township - northeast corner
- Noble Township - east
- Defiance Township - southeast
- Emerald Township, Paulding County - south
- Crane Township, Paulding County - southwest corner
- Mark Township - west
- Farmer Township - northwest corner

The village of Sherwood is located in western Delaware Township.

== Name and history ==
Statewide, other Delaware Townships are located in Delaware and Hancock counties.

== Government ==
The township is governed by a three-member board of trustees, who are elected in November of odd-numbered years to a four-year term beginning on the following January 1. Two are elected in the year after the presidential election and one is elected in the year before it. There is also an elected township fiscal officer, who serves a four-year term beginning on April 1 of the year after the election, which is held in November of the year before the presidential election. Vacancies in the fiscal officership or on the board of trustees are filled by the remaining trustees.

== Transportation ==
Significant highways in Delaware Township include:

- County Road 424, which travels east–west through the southern half of the township
- U.S. Route 127, which travels north–south through Sherwood in the western half of the township
- State Route 18, which travels east–west through the center of the township
