= Mark Center, Ohio =

Unincorporated community in Ohio, U.S.

Coordinates: 41°17′20″N 84°37′52″W

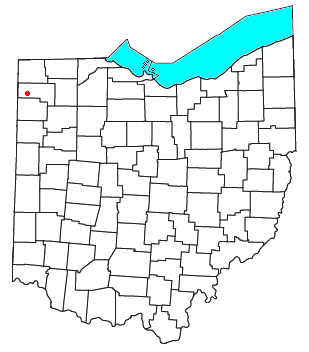
Location of Mark Center, Ohio

Mark Center is an unincorporated community in central Mark Township, Defiance County, Ohio, United States. It has a post office with the ZIP code 43536. It is located on Farmer-Mark Road, a short distance south of State Route 18.

== History ==
Mark Center was laid out in 1875 when the railroad was extended to that point. The community was so named on account of its location being near the geographical center of Mark Township.

A post office has been in operation at Mark Center since 1875.
