= Edgerton, Ohio =

- Village
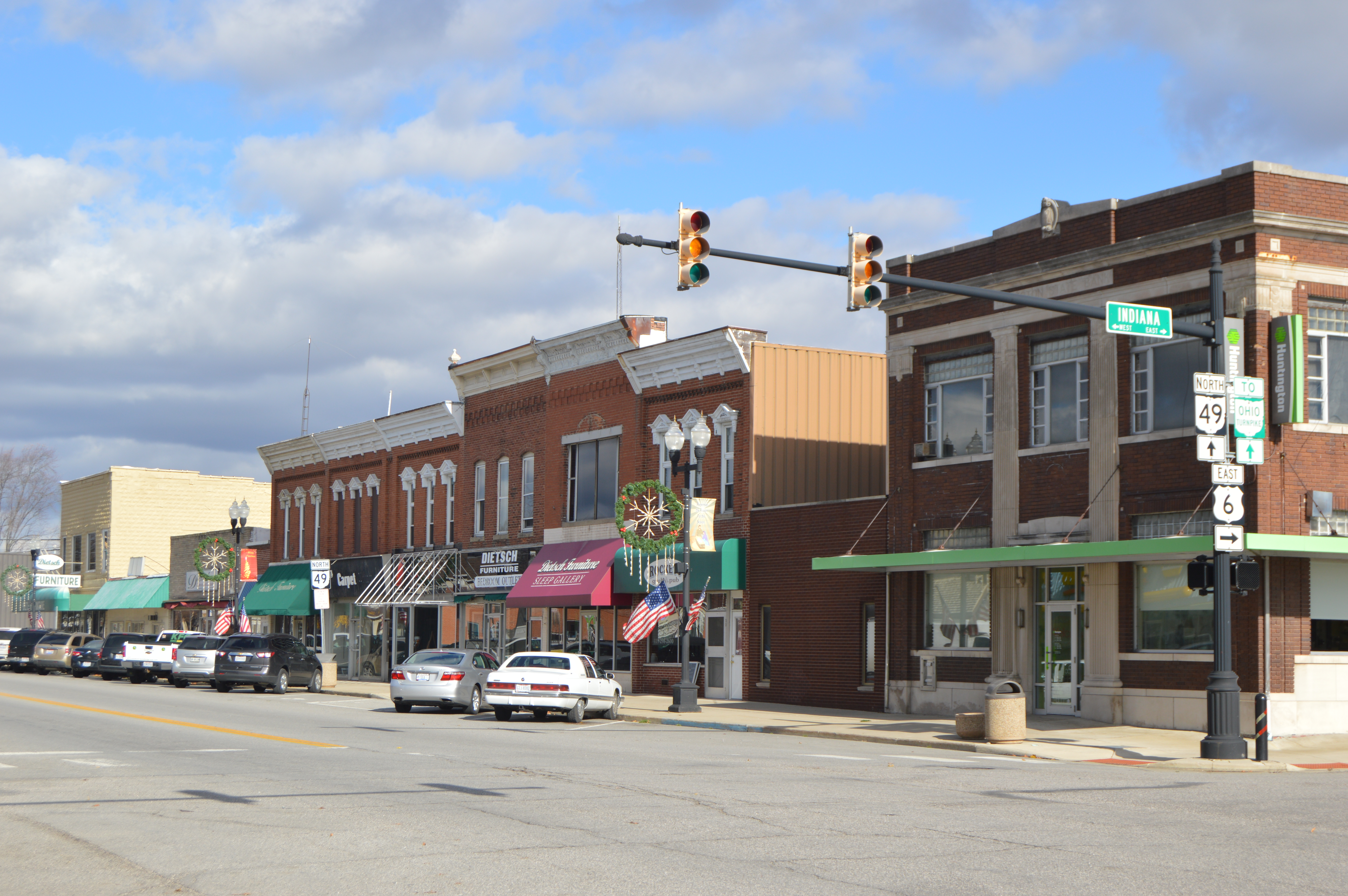
- Michigan Ave. north of Indiana St.

- Seal Wordmark
- Motto(s): "Our Hometown Yours and Mine"
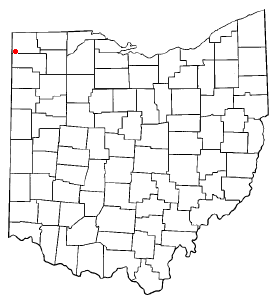
- Location of Edgerton, Ohio

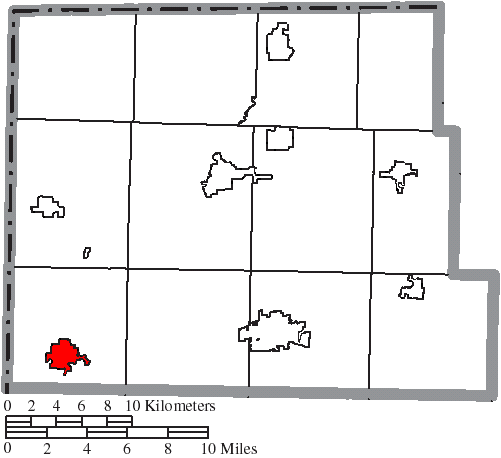
- Location of Edgerton in Williams County
- Coordinates: 41°26′58″N 84°44′49″W
- Country: United States
- State: Ohio
- County: Williams
- Township: St. Joseph
- Founded: 1854
- Incorporated: December 4, 1865
- Named for: Alfred Peck Edgerton

Government
  - Type: Village council
  - Mayor: Robert Day

Area
  - Total: 1.72 sq mi (4.46 km^{2})
  - Land: 1.71 sq mi (4.44 km^{2})
  - Water: 0.0077 sq mi (0.02 km^{2})
- Elevation: 837 ft (255 m)

Population (2020)
  - Total: 1,881
  - Estimate (2023): 1,866
  - Density: 1,097.2/sq mi (423.63/km^{2})
- Time zone: UTC-5 (Eastern (EST))
  - Summer (DST): UTC-4 (EDT)
- ZIP code: 43517
- Area code: 419
- FIPS code: 39-24486
- GNIS feature ID: 2398784
- Website: Official website

Edgerton is a village in Williams County, Ohio, United States in the extreme northwest corner of the state. The population was 1,881 at the 2020 census.

== History ==
The area around Edgerton was organized as St. Joseph Township on December 2, 1832. Edgerton was platted in 1854 by Charles Pratt. The village was named after Alfred Peck Edgerton, a land agent and U.S. congressman. A post office was established in 1854. The village was incorporated on December 4, 1865.

== Geography ==
The St. Joseph River lies along the eastern edge of the village.

According to the United States Census Bureau, the village has a total area of 1.88 square miles (4.87 km^{2}), of which 1.87 square miles (4.84 km^{2}) is land and 0.01 square miles (0.03 km^{2}) is water.

== Demographics ==
Historical population
Census	Pop.	Note	%±
1870	690		—
1880	782		13.3%
1890	967		23.7%
1900	1,043		7.9%
1910	1,072		2.8%
1920	987		−7.9%
1930	989		0.2%
1940	1,082		9.4%
1950	1,246		15.2%
1960	1,566		25.7%
1970	2,126		35.8%
1980	1,813		−14.7%
1990	1,896		4.6%
2000	2,117		11.7%
2010	2,012		−5.0%
2020	1,881		−6.5%
2023 (est.)	1,866	▼	−0.8%
U.S. Decennial Census

=== 2010 census ===
As of the census of 2010, there were 2,012 people, 791 households, and 554 families living in the village. The population density was 1,075.9 inhabitants per square mile (415.4/km^{2}). There were 865 housing units at an average density of 462.6 per square mile (178.6/km^{2}). The racial makeup of the village was 97.7% White, 0.2% African American, 0.1% Native American, 0.4% Asian, 0.6% from other races, and 0.8% from two or more races. Hispanic or Latino of any race were 2.5% of the population.

There were 791 households, of which 34.1% had children under the age of 18 living with them, 50.7% were married couples living together, 13.4% had a female householder with no husband present, 5.9% had a male householder with no wife present, and 30.0% were non-families. 26.2% of all households were made up of individuals, and 12% had someone living alone who was 65 years of age or older. The average household size was 2.44 and the average family size was 2.88.

The median age in the village was 41.3 years. 24.6% of residents were under the age of 18; 7% were between the ages of 18 and 24; 23.3% were from 25 to 44; 27.5% were from 45 to 64; and 17.8% were 65 years of age or older. The gender makeup of the village was 47.3% male and 52.7% female.

=== 2000 census ===
As of the census of 2000, there were 2,117 people, 812 households, and 568 families living in the village. The population density was 1,137.8 inhabitants per square mile (439.3/km^{2}). There were 862 housing units at an average density of 463.3 per square mile (178.9/km^{2}). The racial makeup of the village was 97.45% White, 0.19% African American, 0.09% Native American, 0.05% Asian, 0.05% Pacific Islander, 0.90% from other races, and 1.28% from two or more races. Hispanic or Latino of any race were 2.08% of the population.

There were 812 households, out of which 33.5% had children under the age of 18 living with them, 54.2% were married couples living together, 11.3% had a female householder with no husband present, and 30.0% were non-families. 25.2% of all households were made up of individuals, and 12.4% had someone living alone who was 65 years of age or older. The average household size was 2.52 and the average family size was 3.01.

In the village, the population was spread out, with 26.8% under the age of 18, 8.5% from 18 to 24, 27.8% from 25 to 44, 20.7% from 45 to 64, and 16.2% who were 65 years of age or older. The median age was 36 years. For every 100 females there were 90.7 males. For every 100 females age 18 and over, there were 83.4 males.

The median income for a household in the village was $38,750, and the median income for a family was $45,865. Males had a median income of $32,456 versus $23,646 for females. The per capita income for the village was $17,690. About 6.3% of families and 8.9% of the population were below the poverty line, including 13.4% of those under age 18 and 8.7% of those age 65 or over.

== Education ==
Edgerton Local Schools District operates one elementary school and Edgerton High School.

Edgerton has a public library, a branch of the Williams County Public Library.
