= Scipio Township, Allen County, Indiana =

Scipio Township
- Township
- Location of Scipio Township in Allen County, Indiana
- Coordinates: 41°13′37″N 84°49′37″W
- Country: United States
- State: Indiana
- County: Allen

Government
  - Type: Indiana township

Area
  - Total: 13.25 sq mi (34.31 km^{2})
  - Land: 13.25 sq mi (34.31 km^{2})
  - Water: 0 sq mi (0 km^{2})
- Elevation: 745 ft (227 m)

Population (2020)
  - Total: 412
  - Density: 31.3/sq mi (12.07/km^{2})
- FIPS code: 18-68292
- GNIS feature ID: 453834

Scipio Township is one of twenty townships in Allen County, Indiana, United States. As of the 2010 census, the population was 414.

== Geography ==
Scipio Township covers an area of 13.3 square miles (34 km^{2}), the second smallest township area in the state.

=== Major highways ===
- SR 37

=== Cemeteries ===
The township contains one cemetery, Scipio.
