= Ney, Ohio =

- Village
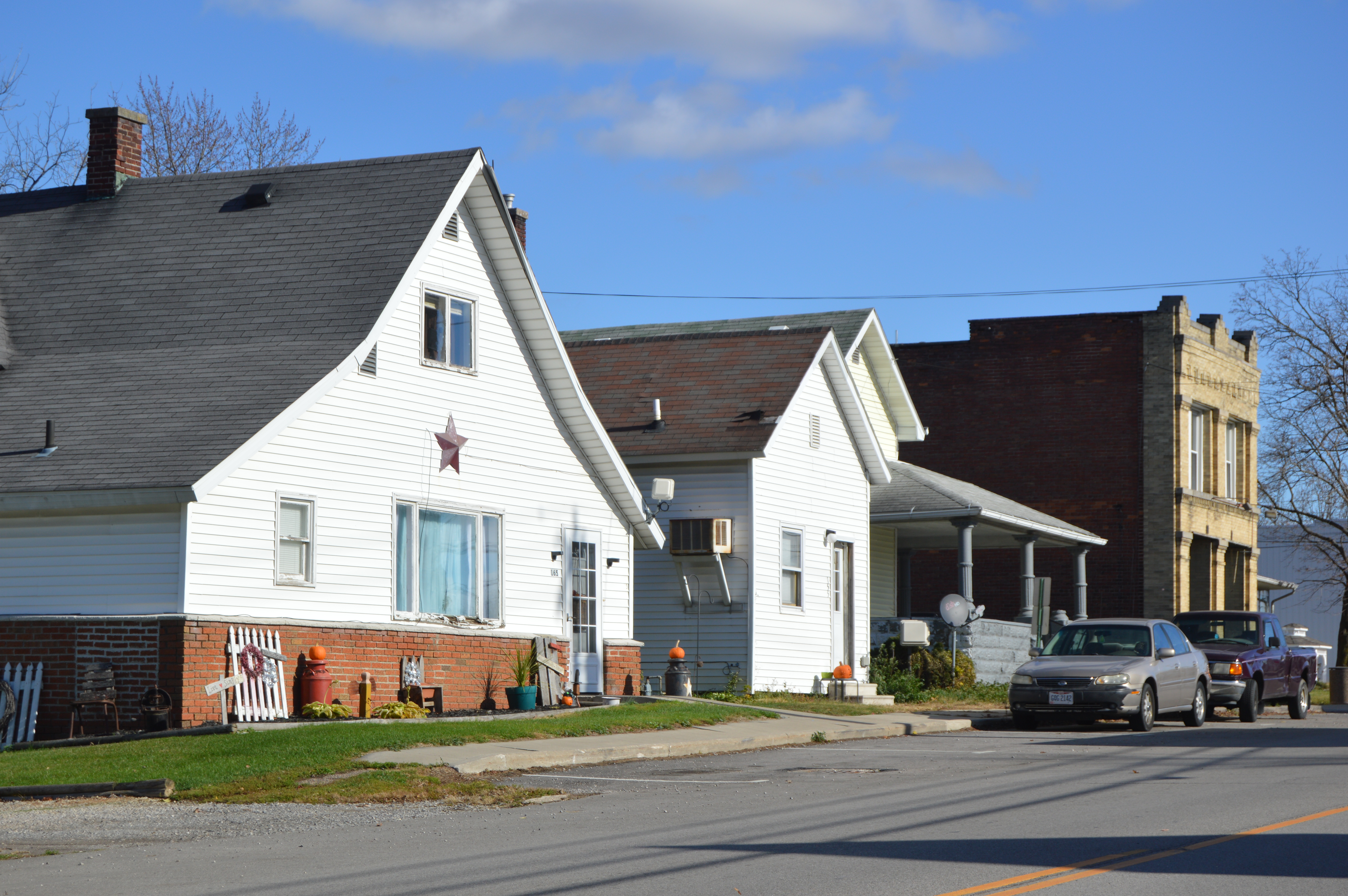
- Main Street

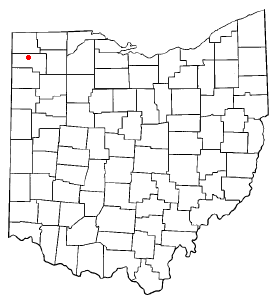
- Location of Ney, Ohio

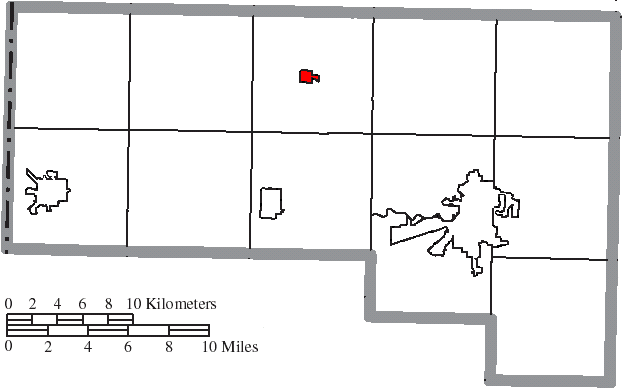
- Location of Ney in Defiance County
- Coordinates: 41°22′50″N 84°31′16″W
- Country: United States
- State: Ohio
- County: Defiance

Government
  - Type: Village council

Area
  - Total: 0.39 sq mi (1.01 km^{2})
  - Land: 0.39 sq mi (1.01 km^{2})
  - Water: 0 sq mi (0.00 km^{2})
- Elevation: 712 ft (217 m)

Population (2020)
  - Total: 303
  - Density: 773.4/sq mi (298.62/km^{2})
- Time zone: UTC-5 (Eastern (EST))
  - Summer (DST): UTC-4 (EDT)
- ZIP code: 43549
- Area code: 419
- FIPS code: 39-55874
- GNIS feature ID: 2399495
- Website: https://villageofney.com/

Ney is a village in Defiance County, Ohio, United States. The population was 303 at the 2020 census. Ney has been noted for having one of the shortest place names in Ohio.

== History ==
A former variant name of Ney was Georgetown. The community was platted as Georgetown in 1846. A post office called Ney has been in operation since 1850. The present name honors Michel Ney, a French officer.

== Geography ==
According to the United States Census Bureau, the village has a total area of 0.41 square miles (1.06 km^{2}), all land.

== Demographics ==
Historical population
| Census | Pop. | Note | %± |
|---|---|---|---|
| 1900 | 289 | | — |
| 1910 | 298 | | 3.1% |
| 1920 | 282 | | −5.4% |
| 1930 | 276 | | −2.1% |
| 1940 | 299 | | 8.3% |
| 1950 | 301 | | 0.7% |
| 1960 | 338 | | 12.3% |
| 1970 | 378 | | 11.8% |
| 1980 | 379 | | 0.3% |
| 1990 | 331 | | −12.7% |
| 2000 | 364 | | 10.0% |
| 2010 | 354 | | −2.7% |
| 2020 | 303 | | −14.4% |
U.S. Decennial Census

=== 2010 census ===
As of the census of 2010, there were 354 people, 130 households, and 98 families living in the village. The population density was 863.4 inhabitants per square mile (333.4/km^{2}). There were 140 housing units at an average density of 341.5 per square mile (131.9/km^{2}). The racial makeup of the village was 96.3% White, 2.5% from other races, and 1.1% from two or more races. Hispanic or Latino of any race were 4.5% of the population.

There were 130 households, of which 42.3% had children under the age of 18 living with them, 55.4% were married couples living together, 16.9% had a female householder with no husband present, 3.1% had a male householder with no wife present, and 24.6% were non-families. 19.2% of all households were made up of individuals, and 6.9% had someone living alone who was 65 years of age or older. The average household size was 2.72 and the average family size was 3.07.

The median age in the village was 35.8 years. 31.4% of residents were under the age of 18; 5.9% were between the ages of 18 and 24; 27.5% were from 25 to 44; 23.3% were from 45 to 64; and 11.9% were 65 years of age or older. The gender makeup of the village was 51.1% male and 48.9% female.

=== 2000 census ===
As of the census of 2000, there were 364 people, 136 households, and 102 families living in the village. The population density was 884.4 inhabitants per square mile (341.5/km^{2}). There were 139 housing units at an average density of 337.7 per square mile (130.4/km^{2}). The racial makeup of the village was 97.80% White, 0.27% African American, 0.27% from other races, and 1.65% from two or more races. Hispanic or Latino of any race were 0.55% of the population.

There were 136 households, out of which 40.4% had children under the age of 18 living with them, 58.8% were married couples living together, 12.5% had a female householder with no husband present, and 25.0% were non-families. 21.3% of all households were made up of individuals, and 8.1% had someone living alone who was 65 years of age or older. The average household size was 2.68 and the average family size was 3.14.

In the village, the population was spread out, with 33.0% under the age of 18, 6.9% from 18 to 24, 32.1% from 25 to 44, 15.9% from 45 to 64, and 12.1% who were 65 years of age or older. The median age was 32 years. For every 100 females there were 96.8 males. For every 100 females age 18 and over, there were 96.8 males.

The median income for a household in the village was $36,719, and the median income for a family was $41,250. Males had a median income of $31,250 versus $20,000 for females. The per capita income for the village was $16,743. About 2.8% of families and 4.3% of the population were below the poverty line, including 6.6% of those under age 18 and none of those age 65 or over.

== Notable persons ==
- Ned Garver, Major League Baseball pitcher
