= 1972 United States presidential election in Ohio =

- November 7, 1972

Nominee	Richard Nixon	George McGovern
Party	Republican	Democratic
Home state	California	South Dakota
Running mate	Spiro Agnew	Sargent Shriver
Electoral vote	25	0
Popular vote	2,441,827	1,558,889
Percentage	59.63%	38.07%
County results
Nixon
40–50%
50–60%
60–70%
70–80%
McGovern
40–50%
50–60%
President before election
Richard Nixon
Republican
Elected President
Richard Nixon
Republican

The 1972 United States presidential election in Ohio took place on November 7, 1972. All 50 states and the District of Columbia were part of the 1972 United States presidential election. State voters chose 25 electors to the Electoral College, who voted for president and vice president.

Ohio was won by incumbent President Richard Nixon (R) for the third time by a margin of 21.56%. Nixon won every county in the state except Lucas and Athens counties, which McGovern won by only 0.95% and 1.22% respectively, and gained a majority in all eighty-six winning counties except Cuyahoga, Mahoning and Summit counties. Nixon's biggest win was in Union County where he obtained 75.89 percent of the vote. Nonetheless, this result made Ohio almost 2% more Democratic than the nation at large. Athens County was one of six counties nationwide that McGovern flipped outside of his home state of South Dakota.

This was the last occasion until 2012 that Belmont, Jefferson and Monroe counties voted for a Republican presidential candidate, the last until 2016 that Trumbull County would vote for a Republican presidential candidate, the last until 2020 that Mahoning County would do so, and remains the last to date where Cuyahoga County, which hosts Cleveland, has supported a Republican presidential candidate.

Nixon became the first ever Republican to win the White House without carrying Athens County. He also became the second presidential candidate ever to carry Ohio three times, after Franklin D. Roosevelt and Donald Trump, who each won the state in three consecutive elections.

== Results ==
1972 United States presidential election in Ohio
Party	Candidate	Votes	Percentage	Electoral votes
Republican	Richard Nixon (incumbent)	2,441,827	59.63%	26
Democrat	George McGovern	1,558,889	38.07%	0
American Independent	John G. Schmitz	80,067	1.96%	0
Socialist Labor	Louis Fisher	7,107	0.17%	0
Not Designated	Gus Hall	6,437	0.16%	0
No party	Write-ins	460	0.01%	0
Totals		4,094,787	100.00%	25
Voter turnout (voting age/registered votes)				57%/90%

=== Results by county ===
County	Richard Nixon Republican		George McGovern Democratic		John G. Schmitz American Independent		Louis Fisher Socialist Labor		Gus Hall Not designated		Margin		Total votes cast
County	#	%	#	%	#	%	#	%	#	%	#	%	Total votes cast
Adams	4,980	63.18%	2,709	34.37%	172	2.18%	11	0.14%	10	0.13%	2,271	28.81%	7,882
Allen	26,966	69.96%	10,184	26.42%	1,231	3.19%	77	0.20%	85	0.22%	16,782	43.54%	38,543
Ashland	12,470	73.04%	4,302	25.20%	268	1.57%	24	0.14%	10	0.06%	8,168	47.84%	17,074
Ashtabula	22,762	58.96%	15,052	38.99%	731	1.89%	30	0.08%	29	0.08%	7,710	19.97%	38,608
Athens	9,735	48.88%	9,977	50.10%	142	0.71%	27	0.14%	34	0.17%	−242	−1.22%	19,915
Auglaize	11,900	69.81%	4,617	27.08%	500	2.93%	14	0.08%	7	0.04%	7,283	42.73%	17,047
Belmont	17,628	53.62%	14,800	45.01%	337	1.03%	47	0.14%	54	0.16%	2,828	8.61%	32,878
Brown	6,772	62.68%	3,770	34.89%	246	2.28%	7	0.06%	6	0.06%	3,002	27.79%	10,804
Butler	50,380	68.42%	21,194	28.78%	1,840	2.50%	80	0.11%	141	0.19%	29,186	39.64%	73,635
Carroll	5,984	66.39%	2,755	30.56%	262	2.91%	6	0.07%	6	0.07%	3,229	35.83%	9,014
Champaign	8,756	69.48%	3,626	28.77%	211	1.67%	6	0.05%	4	0.03%	5,130	40.71%	12,603
Clark	34,447	61.79%	19,725	35.38%	1,197	2.15%	214	0.38%	165	0.30%	14,722	26.41%	55,750
Clermont	22,936	71.70%	8,276	25.87%	738	2.31%	18	0.06%	18	0.06%	14,660	45.83%	31,989
Clinton	8,140	74.08%	2,709	24.65%	133	1.21%	3	0.03%	3	0.03%	5,431	49.43%	10,988
Columbiana	27,308	62.63%	15,683	35.97%	554	1.27%	23	0.05%	24	0.06%	11,625	26.66%	43,602
Coshocton	8,082	66.21%	3,790	31.05%	245	2.01%	50	0.41%	39	0.32%	4,292	35.16%	12,206
Crawford	14,632	69.50%	5,518	26.21%	863	4.10%	14	0.07%	19	0.09%	9,114	43.29%	21,053
Cuyahoga	329,493	49.94%	317,670	48.15%	10,078	1.53%	1,303	0.20%	1,191	0.18%	11,823	1.79%	659,751
Darke	13,862	65.71%	6,534	30.97%	658	3.12%	16	0.08%	26	0.12%	7,328	34.74%	21,096
Defiance	8,914	65.40%	4,377	32.11%	322	2.36%	5	0.04%	6	0.04%	4,537	33.29%	13,630
Delaware	12,950	72.40%	4,452	24.89%	468	2.62%	9	0.05%	7	0.04%	8,498	47.51%	17,886
Erie	16,714	58.46%	10,889	38.09%	813	2.84%	103	0.36%	72	0.25%	5,825	20.37%	28,591
Fairfield	21,909	71.67%	7,746	25.34%	852	2.79%	19	0.06%	19	0.06%	14,163	46.33%	30,568
Fayette	6,970	73.25%	2,344	24.63%	191	2.01%	5	0.05%	3	0.03%	4,626	48.62%	9,515
Franklin	219,771	63.74%	117,562	34.09%	5,496	1.59%	1,028	0.30%	948	0.27%	102,209	29.65%	344,808
Fulton	8,387	68.55%	3,615	29.55%	212	1.73%	5	0.04%	9	0.07%	4,772	39.00%	12,234
Gallia	6,506	72.40%	2,341	26.05%	108	1.20%	13	0.14%	14	0.16%	4,165	46.35%	8,986
Geauga	15,624	66.27%	7,329	31.09%	538	2.28%	47	0.20%	37	0.16%	8,295	35.18%	23,577
Greene	25,349	65.15%	12,736	32.73%	743	1.91%	38	0.10%	38	0.10%	12,613	32.42%	38,909
Guernsey	9,648	66.00%	4,757	32.54%	175	1.20%	9	0.06%	18	0.12%	4,891	33.46%	14,619
Hamilton	239,212	65.65%	119,054	32.67%	5,552	1.52%	320	0.09%	186	0.05%	120,158	32.98%	364,385
Hancock	18,111	70.68%	6,084	23.74%	1,330	5.19%	48	0.19%	51	0.20%	12,027	46.94%	25,624
Hardin	8,713	69.14%	3,535	28.05%	338	2.68%	8	0.06%	5	0.04%	5,178	41.09%	12,602
Harrison	4,554	64.96%	2,388	34.07%	58	0.83%	3	0.04%	7	0.10%	2,166	30.89%	7,010
Henry	8,099	70.58%	3,145	27.41%	213	1.86%	4	0.03%	8	0.07%	4,954	43.17%	11,475
Highland	8,524	69.72%	3,464	28.33%	219	1.79%	2	0.02%	4	0.03%	5,060	41.39%	12,226
Hocking	5,407	63.67%	2,874	33.84%	201	2.37%	1	0.01%	9	0.11%	2,533	29.83%	8,492
Holmes	3,752	69.97%	1,507	28.11%	103	1.92%	0	0.00%	0	0.00%	2,245	41.86%	5,362
Huron	10,942	63.10%	5,491	31.67%	846	4.88%	41	0.24%	20	0.12%	5,451	31.43%	17,340
Jackson	7,351	67.30%	3,410	31.22%	148	1.35%	6	0.05%	8	0.07%	3,941	36.08%	10,923
Jefferson	21,531	56.25%	16,198	42.32%	442	1.15%	59	0.15%	44	0.11%	5,333	13.93%	38,274
Knox	10,705	63.95%	5,370	32.08%	566	3.38%	56	0.33%	42	0.25%	5,335	31.87%	16,739
Lake	42,488	58.90%	27,523	38.15%	1,900	2.63%	121	0.17%	109	0.15%	14,965	20.75%	72,141
Lawrence	15,125	67.02%	7,112	31.52%	299	1.32%	23	0.10%	8	0.04%	8,013	35.50%	22,567
Licking	28,070	66.47%	12,460	29.50%	1,633	3.87%	33	0.08%	33	0.08%	15,610	36.97%	42,232
Logan	10,938	71.12%	3,786	24.62%	641	4.17%	9	0.06%	6	0.04%	7,152	46.50%	15,380
Lorain	51,102	56.15%	36,634	40.25%	2,768	3.04%	314	0.34%	198	0.22%	14,468	15.90%	91,016
Lucas	88,401	48.38%	90,142	49.34%	3,101	1.70%	577	0.32%	479	0.26%	−1,741	−0.96%	182,709
Madison	8,372	75.67%	2,484	22.45%	202	1.83%	4	0.04%	2	0.02%	5,888	53.22%	11,064
Mahoning	64,144	49.69%	62,428	48.36%	1,765	1.37%	387	0.30%	355	0.28%	1,716	1.33%	129,088
Marion	17,197	67.02%	7,970	31.06%	449	1.75%	23	0.09%	12	0.05%	9,227	35.96%	25,659
Medina	21,010	64.82%	10,643	32.84%	696	2.15%	22	0.07%	28	0.09%	10,367	31.98%	32,411
Meigs	5,961	70.69%	2,335	27.69%	118	1.40%	4	0.05%	8	0.09%	3,626	43.00%	8,433
Mercer	8,587	57.60%	5,798	38.89%	497	3.34%	10	0.07%	6	0.04%	2,789	18.71%	14,907
Miami	21,226	68.44%	9,121	29.41%	629	2.03%	16	0.05%	11	0.04%	12,105	39.03%	31,012
Monroe	3,721	59.14%	2,483	39.46%	79	1.26%	2	0.03%	1	0.02%	1,238	19.68%	6,292
Montgomery	120,998	58.02%	82,231	39.43%	4,109	1.97%	568	0.27%	636	0.30%	38,767	18.59%	208,552
Morgan	3,679	68.50%	1,554	28.93%	128	2.38%	3	0.06%	7	0.13%	2,125	39.57%	5,371
Morrow	6,886	70.56%	2,527	25.89%	339	3.47%	2	0.02%	2	0.02%	4,359	44.67%	9,759
Muskingum	19,897	63.99%	10,313	33.17%	833	2.68%	21	0.07%	22	0.07%	9,584	30.82%	31,094
Noble	3,274	68.22%	1,449	30.19%	64	1.33%	8	0.17%	4	0.08%	1,825	38.03%	4,799
Ottawa	9,772	57.86%	6,465	38.28%	629	3.72%	12	0.07%	11	0.07%	3,307	19.58%	16,889
Paulding	4,553	64.81%	2,283	32.50%	175	2.49%	4	0.06%	9	0.13%	2,270	32.31%	7,025
Perry	6,716	62.13%	3,728	34.49%	344	3.18%	8	0.07%	6	0.06%	2,988	27.64%	10,809
Pickaway	9,661	74.30%	2,978	22.90%	268	2.06%	45	0.35%	50	0.38%	6,683	51.40%	13,002
Pike	5,037	57.49%	3,531	40.30%	163	1.86%	20	0.23%	10	0.11%	1,506	17.19%	8,761
Portage	23,294	51.76%	20,769	46.15%	869	1.93%	36	0.08%	31	0.07%	2,525	5.61%	45,002
Preble	8,993	70.29%	3,472	27.14%	306	2.39%	11	0.09%	8	0.06%	5,521	43.15%	12,795
Putnam	8,185	66.32%	3,729	30.21%	405	3.28%	6	0.05%	6	0.05%	4,456	36.11%	12,342
Richland	31,117	68.18%	13,468	29.51%	769	1.68%	151	0.33%	136	0.30%	17,649	38.67%	45,641
Ross	15,573	71.15%	5,879	26.86%	346	1.58%	42	0.19%	48	0.22%	9,694	44.29%	21,888
Sandusky	15,489	63.63%	8,308	34.13%	507	2.08%	17	0.07%	16	0.07%	7,181	29.50%	24,343
Scioto	19,998	63.13%	11,008	34.75%	597	1.89%	34	0.11%	34	0.11%	8,990	28.38%	31,679
Seneca	13,939	60.82%	8,180	35.69%	779	3.40%	7	0.03%	9	0.04%	5,759	25.13%	22,918
Shelby	9,089	61.82%	4,721	32.11%	871	5.92%	11	0.07%	11	0.07%	4,368	29.71%	14,703
Stark	92,110	62.74%	51,565	35.12%	2,981	2.03%	74	0.05%	50	0.03%	40,545	27.62%	146,810
Summit	112,419	49.92%	108,534	48.19%	3,925	1.74%	194	0.09%	113	0.05%	3,885	1.73%	225,216
Trumbull	47,680	55.92%	35,278	41.37%	1,579	1.85%	332	0.39%	394	0.46%	12,402	14.55%	85,266
Tuscarawas	18,413	59.07%	12,255	39.32%	452	1.45%	20	0.06%	11	0.04%	6,158	19.75%	31,169
Union	8,389	75.89%	2,447	22.14%	206	1.86%	1	0.01%	5	0.05%	5,942	53.75%	11,054
Van Wert	9,545	71.28%	3,644	27.21%	183	1.37%	6	0.04%	9	0.07%	5,901	44.07%	13,391
Vinton	2,725	62.85%	1,537	35.45%	67	1.55%	5	0.12%	2	0.05%	1,188	27.40%	4,336
Warren	20,210	72.45%	6,941	24.88%	720	2.58%	11	0.04%	13	0.05%	13,269	47.57%	27,897
Washington	14,023	68.63%	5,814	28.45%	497	2.43%	52	0.25%	48	0.23%	8,209	40.18%	20,434
Wayne	20,368	67.72%	9,260	30.79%	395	1.31%	22	0.07%	23	0.08%	11,108	36.93%	30,076
Williams	9,083	66.76%	4,278	31.44%	221	1.63%	9	0.07%	7	0.05%	4,805	35.32%	13,605
Wood	21,080	59.17%	13,494	37.88%	1,002	2.81%	29	0.08%	20	0.06%	7,586	21.29%	35,625
Wyandot	6,414	68.15%	2,771	29.44%	221	2.35%	2	0.02%	4	0.04%	3,643	38.71%	9,412
Totals	2,441,827	59.63%	1,558,889	38.07%	80,067	1.96%	7,107	0.17%	6,437	0.16%	882,938	21.56%	4,094,787 (Note: This total includes 460 write-in votes that were not separated by county.)

== See also ==
- United States presidential elections in Ohio
