= Appalachian Ohio =

Region of Ohio

Coordinates: 39°27′N 82°13′W

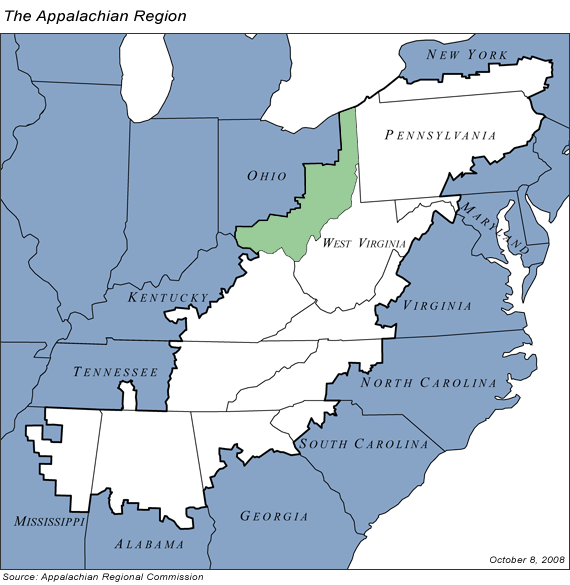
Appalachian Ohio, shaded in green, shown within Appalachia.

Appalachian Ohio is a bioregion and political unit in the southeastern part of the U.S. state of Ohio, characterized by the western foothills of the Appalachian Mountains and the Appalachian Plateau. The Appalachian Regional Commission defines the region as consisting of thirty-two counties. This region roughly overlaps with the Appalachian mixed-mesophytic forests, which begin in southeast Ohio and southwest Pennsylvania and continue south to Georgia and Alabama. The mixed-mesophytic forest is found only in Central and Southern Appalachia and eastern/central China. It is one of the most biodiverse temperate forests in the world.

Geologically, Appalachian Ohio corresponds closely to the terminal moraine of an ancient glacier that runs southwest to northeast through the state. Areas south and east of the moraine are characterized by rough, irregular hills and hollows, characteristic of the Allegheny Plateau and Cumberland Plateaus of the western Appalachian Plateau System. Unlike eastern Appalachia, this region does not have long fin-like ridges like those of the Ridge-and-Valley Appalachians subranges, but a network of rocky hollows and hills going in all directions.

The region is considered part of "central Appalachia", a political, cultural, and bioregional classification that includes southeastern Ohio, Eastern Kentucky, most of West Virginia and Southwestern Virginia. The region has a total population of roughly 1.982 million.

== Counties and county seats ==
Counties of Appalachian Ohio, with East Central region in yellow, South East region in red, and Southern region in blue: 1. Adams County; 2. Ashtabula County; 3. Athens County; 4. Belmont County; 5. Brown County; 6. Carroll County; 7. Clermont County; 8. Columbiana County; 9. Coshocton County; 10. Gallia County; 11. Guernsey County; 12. Harrison County; 13. Highland County; 14. Hocking County; 15. Holmes County; 16. Jackson County / 17. Jefferson County; 18. Lawrence County; 19. Mahoning County; 20. Meigs County; 21. Monroe County; 22. Morgan County; 23. Muskingum County; 24. Noble County; 25. Perry County; 26. Pike County; 27. Ross County; 28. Scioto County; 29. Trumbull County; 30. Tuscarawas County; 31. Vinton County; 32. Washington County

The Governor's Office of Appalachia subdivides the 32 counties of Appalachian Ohio into three smaller regions: East Central Ohio, South East Ohio, and Southern Ohio. The following lists include each county in the region and its county seat.

East Central Ohio
- Ashtabula – Jefferson
- Belmont – St. Clairsville
- Carroll – Carrollton
- Columbiana – Lisbon
- Coshocton – Coshocton
- Guernsey – Cambridge
- Harrison – Cadiz
- Holmes – Millersburg
- Jefferson – Steubenville
- Mahoning – Youngstown
- Muskingum – Zanesville
- Trumbull – Warren
- Tuscarawas – New Philadelphia
South East Ohio
- Athens – Athens
- Hocking – Logan
- Meigs – Pomeroy
- Monroe – Woodsfield
- Morgan – McConnelsville
- Noble – Caldwell
- Perry – New Lexington
- Washington – Marietta
Southern Ohio
- Adams – West Union
- Brown – Georgetown
- Clermont – Batavia
- Gallia – Gallipolis
- Highland – Hillsboro
- Jackson – Jackson
- Lawrence – Ironton
- Pike – Waverly
- Ross – Chillicothe
- Scioto – Portsmouth
- Vinton – McArthur

== Cities ==
Appalachian Ohio has several cities within its borders, which as of the 2010 census included the following localities:

- Youngstown Population: 66,982 Mahoning County and Trumbull County
- Warren Population: 41,557 Trumbull County
- Zanesville Population: 25,487 Muskingum County
- Athens Population: 23,832 Athens County
- Chillicothe Population: 21,901 Ross County
- Ashtabula Population: 19,124 Ashtabula County
- Niles Population: 19,266 Trumbull County
- Portsmouth Population: 20,226 Scioto County
- Steubenville Population: 18,659 Jefferson County
- New Philadelphia Population: 17,288 Tuscarawas County
- Marietta Population: 14,085 Washington County
- East Liverpool Population: 11,195 Columbiana County
- Conneaut Population: 12,841 Ashtabula County
- Salem Population: 12,303 Mahoning County and Columbiana County
- Dover Population: 12,826 Tuscarawas County
- Struthers Population: 10,713 Mahoning County
- Coshocton Population: 11,216 Coshocton County
- Cambridge Population: 10,635 Guernsey County
- Ironton Population: 11,129 Lawrence County
- Girard Population: 9,958 Trumbull County
- Hubbard Population: 7,874 Trumbull County
- Campbell Population: 8,235 Mahoning County
- Canfield Population: 7,515 Mahoning County
- Martins Ferry Population: 6,915 Belmont County
- Cortland Population: 7,104 Trumbull County
- Logan Population: 7,152 Hocking County
- Belpre Population: 6,441 Washington County
- Geneva Population: 6,215 Ashtabula County
- Columbiana Population: 6,384 Mahoning County and Columbiana County
- Hillsboro Population: 6,605 Highland County
- Jackson Population: 6,397 Jackson County
- Wellston Population: 5,663 Jackson County
- Nelsonville Population: 5,392 Athens County
- St. Clairsville Population: 5,184 Belmont County

== Politics ==
2006 U.S. Senate election in Ohio.

2024 U.S. Senate election in Ohio.

With the exception of progressive college cities like Athens, Ohio, Appalachian Ohio has been a Republican stronghold since Donald Trump became the party's nominee in 2016. Historically, the region was a Democratic stronghold or evenly split.

Neighboring parts of Appalachia in other states have also shifted towards the Republicans during the same time period, including West Virginia and the Eastern Kentucky Coalfield.

Democrat Sherrod Brown's Ohio U.S. Senate elections show the region's long-term trend towards Republicans. In 2024, Brown only won Athens county. But in 2006, Brown had won almost every single county in the region.

Appalachian Ohio Presidential election results
Year	Democratic	Republican	Third parties
2024	30.8% 288,055	68.4% 638,561	0.6% 7,196
2020	32.7% 313,027'	66.0% 632,243	1.4% 12,982
2016	33.3% 298,738	62.6% 562,102	4.1% 37,224
2012	48.7% 433,276	51.3% 456,776	0% 0
2008	48.51% 461,255	48.99% 465,768	2.5% 23,814
2004	48.31% 462,464	51.13% 489,425	0.56% 5,341
2000	47.07% 388,202	48.92% 403,405	2.54% 20,975
1996	49.48% 401,991	36.2% 294,062	13.37% 108,635

== Transportation ==
John Glenn Columbus International Airport, in Columbus, is the largest airport and serves most of the residents in southeast Ohio. John Glenn offers primarily domestic flights. Cincinnati/Northern Kentucky International Airport to the southwest serves most of the residents of Cincinnati and its metropolitan area, and Cleveland Hopkins International Airport to the north is also a major hub airport.

== Appalachian Regional Commission ==
Map showing 2012 ARC economic designations for Appalachian Ohio.

The Appalachian Regional Commission was formed in 1965 to aid economic development in the Appalachian region, which was lagging far behind the rest of the nation on most economic indicators. The Appalachian region currently defined by the commission includes 420 counties in 13 states, including 32 counties in Ohio. The commission gives each county one of five possible economic designations— distressed, at-risk, transitional, competitive, or attainment— with "distressed" counties being the most economically endangered and "attainment" counties being the most economically prosperous. These designations are based primarily on three indicators— three-year average unemployment rate, market income per capita, and poverty rate. In 2009, Appalachian Ohio had a three-year average unemployment rate of 8.4%, compared with 7.5% statewide and 6.6% nationwide. In 2008, Appalachian Ohio had a per capita market income of $22,294, compared with $29,344 statewide and $34,004 nationwide. In 2009, Appalachian Ohio had a poverty rate of 16%, compared to 13.6% statewide and 13.5% nationwide. Seven Ohio counties—Adams, Athens, Meigs, Morgan, Noble, Pike and Vinton—were designated "distressed", while nine—Ashtabula, Gallia, Guernsey, Harrison, Jackson, Lawrence, Monroe, Perry and Scioto—were designated "at-risk". The remaining half of Appalachian Ohio counties were designated "transitional", meaning they lagged behind the national average on one of the three key indicators. No counties in Ohio were given the "attainment" or "competitive" designations.

Athens County had Appalachian Ohio's highest poverty rating, with 32.8% of its residents living below the poverty line. Clermont had Appalachian Ohio's highest per capita income ($30,515) and Holmes had the lowest unemployment rate (5.5%). Washington County has the highest high school graduation rate (84.5%), while Adams County has the lowest (68.6%). Although Holmes County has a significantly lower high school graduation rate than Adams County at 51.5%, its graduation rates are somewhat skewed compared to the rest of the region, due to the county's high population of Amish, whose children do not attend school past the eighth grade.

== Notable people ==
Notable Americans from Appalachian Ohio include:

- Ted Strickland, 68th Governor of Ohio (2007–2011)
- Grandma Gatewood, first solo female thru-hiker of the Appalachian Trail and first person to hike it three times.
- John Glenn, former United States Marine Corps pilot, astronaut, and United States senator. First American to orbit the Earth.
- Sarah Jessica Parker, actress and producer
- Nancy Zimpher, chancellor of the State University of New York system
- Dean Martin, actor
- Lou Groza, football placekicker and offensive tackle for Cleveland Browns and member of the Pro Football Hall of Fame
- Jimmy the Greek
- Clark Gable, actor
- George Custer, served in the American Civil War and was killed in the Battle of Little Big Horn
- Ulysses S. Grant, 18th US president (1869–1877)
- William McKinley, 25th US president (1897–1901)
- Cy Young, Major League Baseball pitcher. The Cy Young Award is given annually to the best pitcher in MLB.
- Cody Garbrandt, UFC fighter
- Stephen Kappes, Deputy Director of the CIA during the Bush and Obama administrations
- Maya Lin, architect and designer of the Vietnam War Memorial in Washington, D.C.
- Katie Smith, Three-time Olympic gold medal winner with Team USA basketball; two-time WNBA champion and Ohio State University standout
- Joe Burrow, quarterback for the Cincinnati Bengals, number one pick in the 2020 NFL draft and winner of the 2019 Heisman Trophy
- Jack Roush, founder, CEO, and co-owner of the NASCAR team Roush-Fenway Racing.
- Ambrose Bierce, author
- Mike Palagyi, Major League Baseball pitcher
- J. T. Miller, professional ice hockey player and alternate captain for the Vancouver Canucks

== See also ==
- Appalachian music
- Appalachian studies
- Asimina triloba
- Critical pedagogy
- Hocking Hills
- Log cabin
- Melungeon
- Ohio University
- Settlement school
- Shawnee State Park
- Southern Illinois
- Southern Indiana
- Underground Railroad
- War on Poverty
- Wayne National Forest
- Youngstown State University
- Zaleski State Forest
