= 2012 United States presidential election in Ohio =

- November 6, 2012
- Turnout: 70.54% (▲0.57 pp)

| Nominee | Barack Obama | Mitt Romney |
| Party | Democratic | Republican |
| Home state | Illinois | Massachusetts |
| Running mate | Joe Biden | Paul Ryan |
| Electoral vote | 18 | 0 |
| Popular vote | 2,827,709 | 2,661,437 |
| Percentage | 50.67% | 47.69% |

Obama
40–50%
50–60%
60–70%
80–90%
Romney
40–50%
50–60%
60–70%
70–80%
President before election
Barack Obama
Democratic
Elected President
Barack Obama
Democratic

The 2012 United States presidential election in Ohio took place on November 6, 2012, as part of the 2012 United States presidential election in which all 50 states plus the District of Columbia participated. Ohio voters chose 18 electors to represent them in the Electoral College via a popular vote pitting incumbent Democratic President Barack Obama and his running mate, Vice President Joe Biden, against Republican challenger and former Massachusetts Governor Mitt Romney and his running mate, Congressman Paul Ryan. This election continued Ohio's bellwether streak, as the state voted for the winner of the presidency in every election from 1964 to 2016.

President Obama won the popular vote in Ohio with 50.67% of the vote over Mitt Romney in second place at 47.69%, a Democratic victory margin of 2.98%. A number of media outlets called Ohio for Obama, declared him re-elected for a second term. Obama's performance was a decline from 2008 when he won the state by a 4.59% margin over U.S. Senator John McCain, and he narrowly lost five counties that he won in 2008. However, he narrowly improved his margins in Cuyahoga County and Franklin County, home to the second largest city, Cleveland, and the state's capital and largest city, Columbus, respectively, allowing him to carry the state. Obama became the first Democrat to win the White House without Belmont County since Grover Cleveland in 1892, as well as the first to win without neighboring Jefferson County since Woodrow Wilson in 1916 and the first to win without Monroe or Tuscarawas Counties since John F. Kennedy in 1960. Ohio is also one of only three states that backed Obama twice that would go on to vote against his vice president Joe Biden in 2020, the other two being Florida and Iowa.

As of the 2024 United States presidential election, this is the last time the Democratic presidential nominee won Ohio, as well as the last time Ashtabula County, Erie County, Ottawa County, Portage County, Sandusky County, Stark County, Trumbull County, and Wood County, have voted Democratic in a presidential election. This was also the last time the state voted for the winner of the national popular vote until 2024.

== Primaries ==
=== Democratic primary ===
The Democratic primary was held on March 6, 2012, the same day as the Republican primary. Incumbent President Barack Obama ran unopposed, and thus won all 151 of the state's delegates.

=== Republican primary ===
2012 Ohio Republican presidential primary
- March 6, 2012

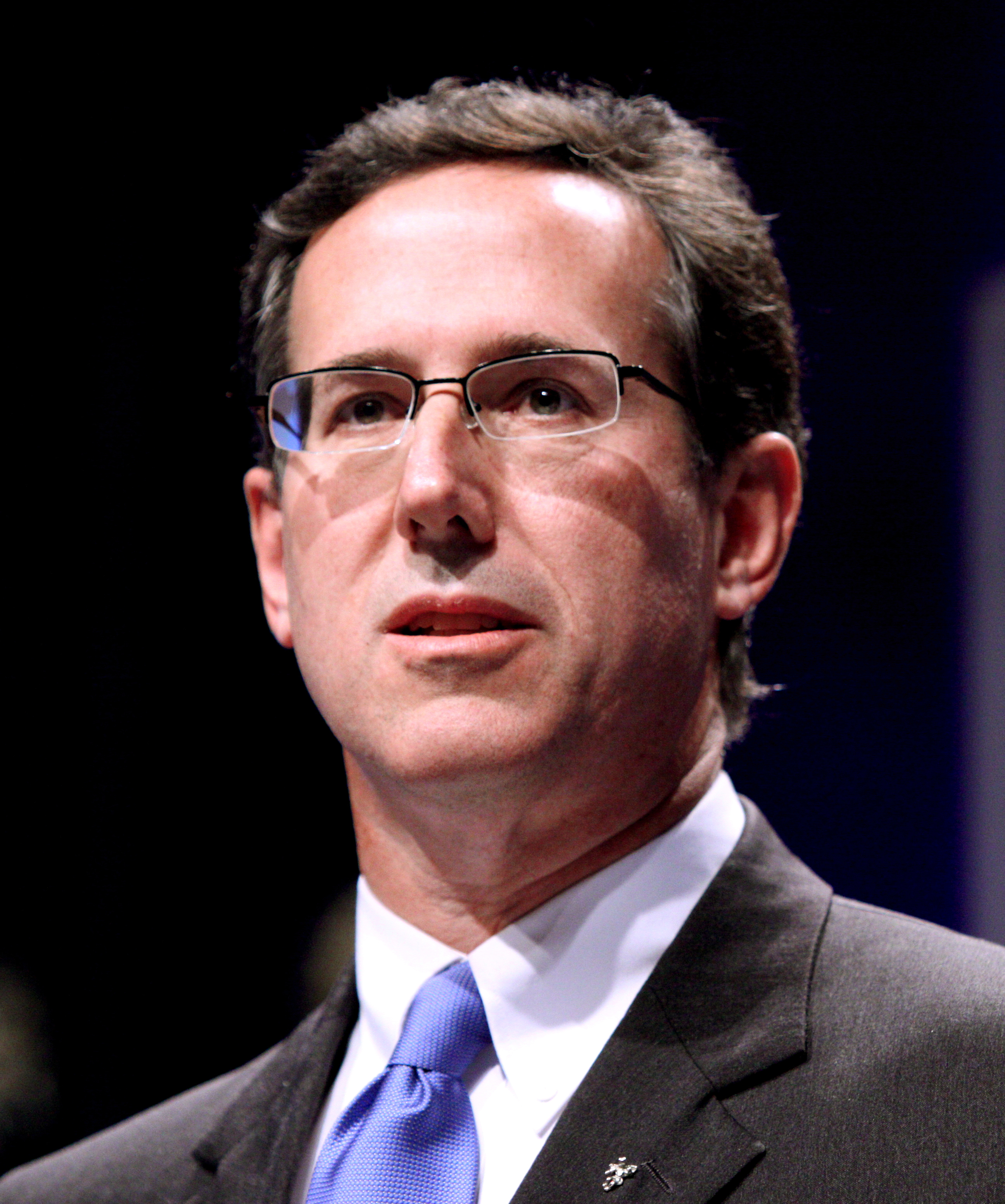

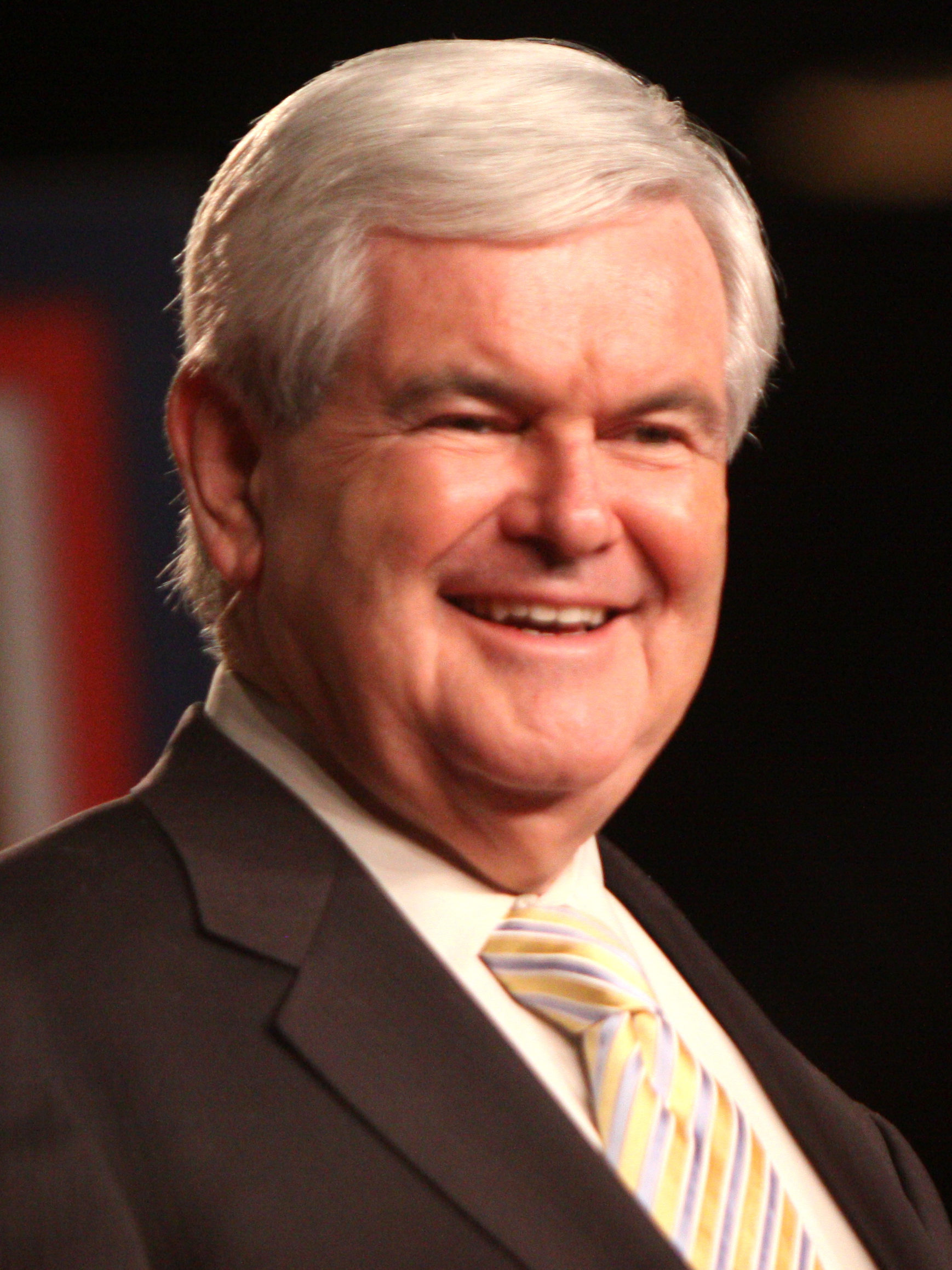

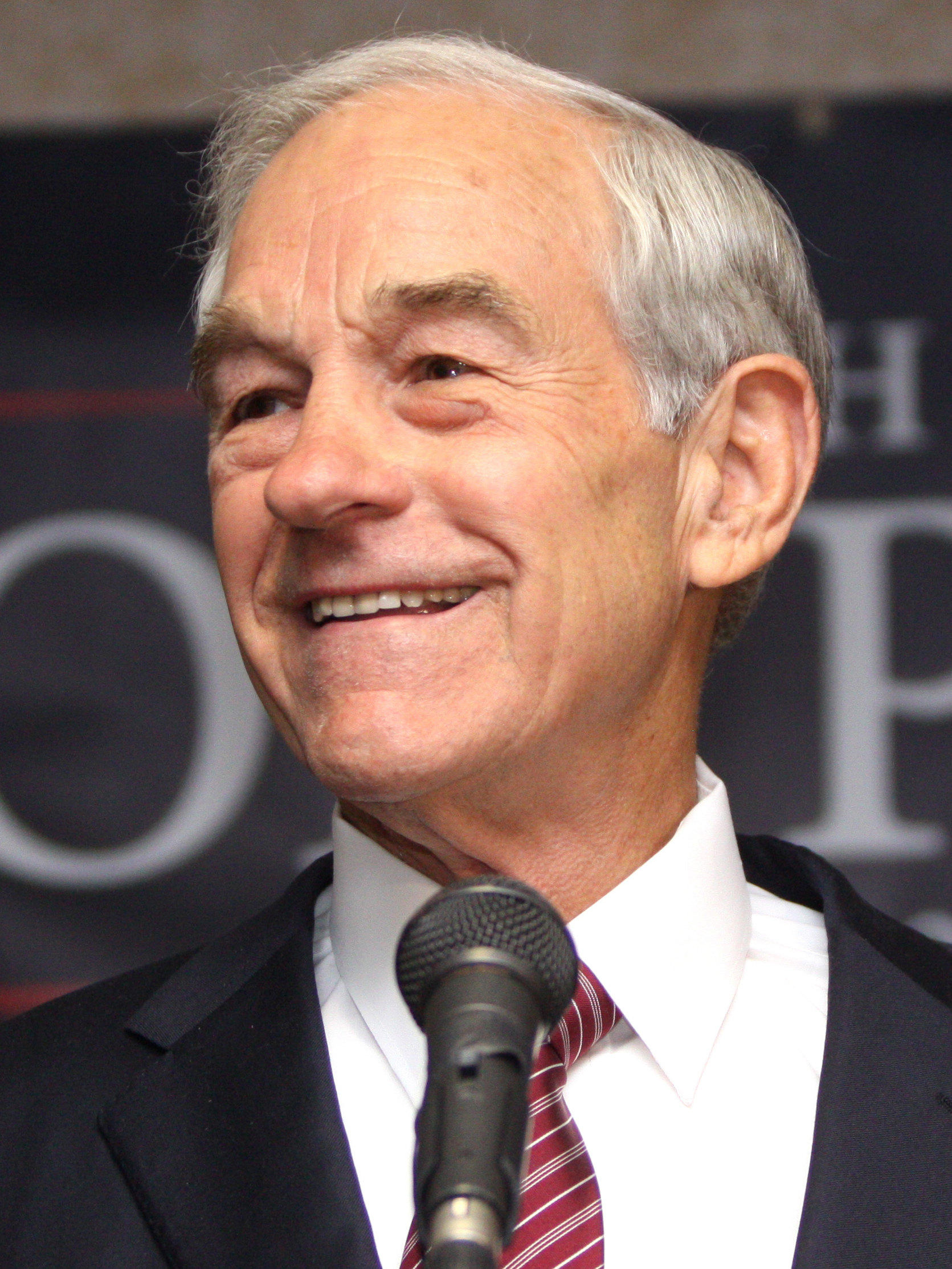
| Candidate | Mitt Romney | Rick Santorum |
| Home state | Massachusetts | Pennsylvania |
| Delegate count | 38 | 25 |
| Popular vote | 456,513 | 446,255 |
| Percentage | 37.9% | 37.1% |
| Candidate | Newt Gingrich | Ron Paul |
| Home state | Georgia | Texas |
| Delegate count | 0 | 0 |
| Popular vote | 175,556 | 111,238 |
| Percentage | 14.6% | 9.2% |
- Ohio results by county Mitt Romney Rick Santorum

The 2012 Ohio Republican presidential primary took place on March 6, 2012.

Ohio has 66 delegates to the Republican National Convention. Three party officials (also known as "superdelegates") are not bound by the primary result. Forty-eight delegates are generally awarded winner-take-all by Congressional district. Another 15 delegates are awarded to the candidate who gets an outright majority statewide, or are allocated proportionately among candidates winning at least 20% of the vote if no candidate wins a majority.

2012 Ohio Republican presidential primary
| Candidate | Votes | Percentage | Estimated national delegates |
|---|---|---|---|
| Mitt Romney | 460,831 | 37.9% | 38 |
| Rick Santorum | 448,580 | 37.1% | 25 |
| Newt Gingrich | 177,183 | 14.6% | 0 |
| Ron Paul | 113,256 | 9.3% | 0 |
| Rick Perry | 7,539 | 0.6% | 0 |
| Jon Huntsman, Jr. | 6,490 | 0.5% | 0 |
| Unprojected delegates | | | 7 |
| Totals | 1,213,879 | 100.0% | 66 |

Despite an early lead in the vote count and having won most counties, Santorum's lead was reduced and overcome by Romney as Hamilton and Cuyahoga County results came in. Romney also won areas such as Akron, Youngstown, Dayton and Columbus. These and other highly populated counties would eventually go to Obama in November.

| Key: | Withdrew prior to contest |

Notes:

1. In the six congressional districts where Rick Santorum submitted only a partial slate of district delegates and district alternates by the late December 2011 deadline, he will be automatically awarded only the number of delegates he submitted, assuming he wins the particular district. The Ohio Republican Party said on March 2, 2012, that the remaining delegates in such districts will be "considered unbound" until a panel composed of three members of the Ohio GOP's central committee decides which campaign (if any) is permitted to appoint such delegates.

2. In three congressional districts (OH-6, OH-9 and OH-13), Rick Santorum did not make the district-specific portion of the ballot.

3. In every district, each of the 6 candidates listed above appears on the "at-large" portion of the ballot. The results of the at-large ballot will determine the allocation of fifteen national convention delegates.

== General election ==
=== Campaign ===
Ohio was considered a key battleground state throughout the general election campaign, and both Barack Obama and Mitt Romney campaigned extensively in the state. Romney visited the state 51 times, while Obama visited 22 times. Ohio had the most political ads run during the election, with 41,162 ads run by the Romney campaign and 100,674 by the Obama campaign.

=== Predictions ===
| Source | Ranking | As of |
|---|---|---|
| Huffington Post | Lean D | November 6, 2012 |
| CNN | Tossup | November 6, 2012 |
| New York Times | Tossup | November 6, 2012 |
| Washington Post | Tossup | November 6, 2012 |
| RealClearPolitics | Tossup | November 6, 2012 |
| Sabato's Crystal Ball | Lean D | November 5, 2012 |
| FiveThirtyEight | Solid D | November 6, 2012 |

=== Results ===
2012 United States presidential election in Ohio
| Party | Candidate | Running mate | Votes | Percentage | Electoral votes |
|---|---|---|---|---|---|
| Democratic | Barack Obama (incumbent) | Joe Biden (incumbent) | 2,827,709 | 50.58% | 18 |
| Republican | Mitt Romney | Paul Ryan | 2,661,437 | 47.60% | 0 |
| Libertarian | Gary Johnson | Jim Gray | 49,493 | 0.89% | 0 |
| Green | Jill Stein | Cheri Honkala | 18,573 | 0.33% | 0 |
| Independent | Richard Duncan | Ricky Johnson | 12,502 | 0.22% | 0 |
| Constitution | Virgil Goode | Jim Clymer | 8,152 | 0.15% | 0 |
| Socialist | Stewart Alexander | Alex Mendoza | 2,967 | 0.05% | 0 |
| Others | | | 23 | 0.00% | 0 |
| Totals | | | 5,590,934 | 100.00% | 18 |
| Voter turnout (registered voters) | | | | | 70.54% |

==== By county ====
| County | Barack Obama Democratic | | Mitt Romney Republican | | Various candidates Other parties | | Margin | | Total votes cast |
| County | # | % | # | % | # | % | # | % | Total votes cast |
|---|---|---|---|---|---|---|---|---|---|
| Adams | 3,976 | 35.76% | 6,865 | 61.75% | 277 | 2.49% | -2,889 | -25.99% | 11,118 |
| Allen | 17,914 | 37.06% | 29,502 | 61.03% | 925 | 1.91% | -11,588 | -23.97% | 48,341 |
| Ashland | 8,281 | 34.02% | 15,519 | 63.76% | 540 | 2.22% | -7,238 | -29.74% | 24,340 |
| Ashtabula | 23,803 | 55.10% | 18,298 | 42.36% | 1,099 | 2.54% | 5,505 | 12.74% | 43,200 |
| Athens | 18,307 | 66.02% | 8,543 | 30.81% | 878 | 3.17% | 9,764 | 35.21% | 27,728 |
| Auglaize | 5,831 | 24.87% | 17,169 | 73.22% | 449 | 1.91% | -11,338 | -48.35% | 23,449 |
| Belmont | 14,156 | 44.67% | 16,758 | 52.88% | 774 | 2.45% | -2,602 | -8.21% | 31,688 |
| Brown | 7,107 | 36.65% | 11,916 | 61.45% | 369 | 1.90% | -4,809 | -24.80% | 19,392 |
| Butler | 62,388 | 36.58% | 105,176 | 61.68% | 2,966 | 1.74% | -42,788 | -25.10% | 170,530 |
| Carroll | 5,543 | 41.73% | 7,315 | 55.07% | 426 | 3.20% | -1,772 | -13.34% | 13,284 |
| Champaign | 7,044 | 38.14% | 11,045 | 59.81% | 379 | 2.05% | -4,001 | -21.67% | 18,468 |
| Clark | 31,297 | 48.67% | 31,820 | 49.49% | 1,184 | 1.84% | -523 | -0.82% | 64,301 |
| Clermont | 30,458 | 31.55% | 64,208 | 66.52% | 1,859 | 1.93% | -33,750 | -34.97% | 96,525 |
| Clinton | 5,791 | 31.85% | 12,009 | 66.05% | 383 | 2.10% | -6,218 | -34.20% | 18,183 |
| Columbiana | 19,821 | 42.90% | 25,251 | 54.66% | 1,127 | 2.44% | -5,430 | -11.76% | 46,199 |
| Coshocton | 6,940 | 43.97% | 8,390 | 53.16% | 454 | 2.87% | -1,450 | -9.19% | 15,784 |
| Crawford | 7,507 | 37.82% | 11,852 | 59.72% | 488 | 2.46% | -4,345 | -21.90% | 19,847 |
| Cuyahoga | 447,273 | 69.32% | 190,660 | 29.55% | 7,329 | 1.13% | 256,613 | 39.77% | 645,262 |
| Darke | 6,826 | 26.84% | 18,108 | 71.21% | 496 | 1.95% | -11,282 | -44.37% | 25,430 |
| Defiance | 7,732 | 42.16% | 10,176 | 55.49% | 431 | 2.35% | -2,444 | -13.33% | 18,339 |
| Delaware | 37,292 | 37.71% | 60,194 | 60.86% | 1,413 | 1.43% | -22,902 | -23.15% | 98,899 |
| Erie | 21,793 | 55.17% | 16,952 | 42.92% | 755 | 1.91% | 4,841 | 12.25% | 39,500 |
| Fairfield | 29,890 | 41.39% | 41,034 | 56.82% | 1,296 | 1.79% | -11,144 | -15.43% | 72,220 |
| Fayette | 4,249 | 38.49% | 6,620 | 59.97% | 169 | 1.54% | -2,371 | -21.48% | 11,038 |
| Franklin | 346,373 | 60.53% | 215,997 | 37.75% | 9,818 | 1.72% | 130,376 | 22.78% | 572,188 |
| Fulton | 9,073 | 42.58% | 11,738 | 55.08% | 499 | 2.34% | -2,665 | -12.50% | 21,310 |
| Gallia | 4,557 | 36.10% | 7,750 | 61.40% | 315 | 2.50% | -3,193 | -25.30% | 12,622 |
| Geauga | 19,659 | 38.46% | 30,589 | 59.85% | 865 | 1.69% | -10,930 | -21.39% | 51,113 |
| Greene | 32,256 | 38.57% | 49,819 | 59.57% | 1,551 | 1.86% | -17,563 | -21.00% | 83,626 |
| Guernsey | 7,450 | 44.22% | 8,993 | 53.37% | 406 | 2.41% | -1,543 | -9.15% | 16,849 |
| Hamilton | 219,927 | 52.50% | 193,326 | 46.15% | 5,641 | 1.35% | 26,601 | 6.35% | 418,894 |
| Hancock | 12,564 | 35.11% | 22,443 | 62.72% | 776 | 2.17% | -9,879 | -27.61% | 35,783 |
| Hardin | 4,619 | 37.04% | 7,489 | 60.06% | 362 | 2.90% | -2,870 | -23.02% | 12,470 |
| Harrison | 2,950 | 41.24% | 4,019 | 56.19% | 184 | 2.57% | -1,069 | -14.95% | 7,153 |
| Henry | 5,658 | 39.69% | 8,257 | 57.92% | 342 | 2.39% | -2,599 | -18.23% | 14,257 |
| Highland | 6,054 | 33.86% | 11,413 | 63.83% | 412 | 2.31% | -5,359 | -29.97% | 17,879 |
| Hocking | 6,157 | 48.22% | 6,285 | 49.22% | 326 | 2.56% | -128 | -1.00% | 12,768 |
| Holmes | 2,608 | 22.55% | 8,702 | 75.23% | 257 | 2.22% | -6,094 | -52.68% | 11,567 |
| Huron | 11,006 | 44.54% | 13,060 | 52.85% | 645 | 2.61% | -2,054 | -8.31% | 24,711 |
| Jackson | 5,166 | 38.54% | 7,904 | 58.97% | 334 | 2.49% | -2,738 | -20.43% | 13,404 |
| Jefferson | 15,385 | 46.37% | 17,034 | 51.34% | 758 | 2.29% | -1,649 | -4.97% | 33,177 |
| Knox | 10,470 | 36.78% | 17,266 | 60.66% | 727 | 2.56% | -6,796 | -23.88% | 28,463 |
| Lake | 57,680 | 48.61% | 58,744 | 49.50% | 2,241 | 1.89% | -1,064 | -0.89% | 118,665 |
| Lawrence | 10,744 | 41.43% | 14,651 | 56.50% | 537 | 2.07% | -3,907 | -15.07% | 25,932 |
| Licking | 34,201 | 41.94% | 45,503 | 55.80% | 1,846 | 2.26% | -11,302 | -13.86% | 81,550 |
| Logan | 7,062 | 33.31% | 13,633 | 64.31% | 504 | 2.38% | -6,571 | -31.00% | 21,199 |
| Lorain | 81,464 | 56.87% | 59,405 | 41.47% | 2,384 | 1.66% | 22,059 | 15.40% | 143,253 |
| Lucas | 136,616 | 64.86% | 69,940 | 33.21% | 4,065 | 1.93% | 66,676 | 31.65% | 210,621 |
| Madison | 6,845 | 38.99% | 10,342 | 58.91% | 370 | 2.10% | -3,497 | -19.92% | 17,557 |
| Mahoning | 77,059 | 63.38% | 42,641 | 35.07% | 1,884 | 1.55% | 34,418 | 28.31% | 121,584 |
| Marion | 12,504 | 45.61% | 14,265 | 52.03% | 649 | 2.36% | -1,761 | -6.42% | 27,418 |
| Medina | 38,785 | 42.65% | 50,418 | 55.45% | 1,728 | 1.90% | -11,633 | -12.80% | 90,931 |
| Meigs | 4,027 | 39.41% | 5,895 | 57.69% | 296 | 2.90% | -1,868 | -18.28% | 10,218 |
| Mercer | 4,745 | 21.89% | 16,561 | 76.40% | 370 | 1.71% | -11,816 | -54.51% | 21,676 |
| Miami | 16,383 | 31.50% | 34,606 | 66.53% | 1,025 | 1.97% | -18,223 | -35.03% | 52,014 |
| Monroe | 3,035 | 44.75% | 3,548 | 52.31% | 199 | 2.94% | -513 | -7.56% | 6,782 |
| Montgomery | 137,139 | 51.42% | 124,841 | 46.81% | 4,727 | 1.77% | 12,298 | 4.61% | 266,707 |
| Morgan | 2,814 | 45.86% | 3,179 | 51.81% | 143 | 2.33% | -365 | -5.95% | 6,136 |
| Morrow | 5,933 | 36.59% | 9,865 | 60.83% | 419 | 2.58% | -3,932 | -24.24% | 16,217 |
| Muskingum | 17,002 | 45.73% | 19,264 | 51.81% | 913 | 2.46% | -2,262 | -6.08% | 37,179 |
| Noble | 2,131 | 36.17% | 3,563 | 60.48% | 197 | 3.35% | -1,432 | -24.31% | 5,891 |
| Ottawa | 11,503 | 51.11% | 10,538 | 46.83% | 464 | 2.06% | 965 | 4.28% | 22,505 |
| Paulding | 3,538 | 38.67% | 5,354 | 58.51% | 258 | 2.82% | -1,816 | -19.84% | 9,150 |
| Perry | 7,033 | 46.82% | 7,627 | 50.78% | 360 | 2.40% | -594 | -3.96% | 15,020 |
| Pickaway | 9,684 | 40.09% | 14,037 | 58.11% | 433 | 1.80% | -4,353 | -18.02% | 24,154 |
| Pike | 5,684 | 49.02% | 5,685 | 49.03% | 227 | 1.95% | -1 | -0.01% | 11,596 |
| Portage | 39,453 | 51.65% | 35,242 | 46.14% | 1,689 | 2.21% | 4,211 | 5.51% | 76,384 |
| Preble | 6,211 | 30.71% | 13,535 | 66.92% | 479 | 2.37% | -7,324 | -36.21% | 20,225 |
| Putnam | 4,318 | 23.47% | 13,721 | 74.57% | 361 | 1.96% | -9,403 | -51.10% | 18,400 |
| Richland | 22,687 | 39.25% | 33,867 | 58.59% | 1,252 | 2.16% | -11,180 | -19.34% | 57,806 |
| Ross | 14,569 | 48.31% | 15,008 | 49.76% | 583 | 1.93% | -439 | -1.45% | 30,160 |
| Sandusky | 14,541 | 49.98% | 13,755 | 47.28% | 799 | 2.74% | 786 | 2.70% | 29,095 |
| Scioto | 15,077 | 48.23% | 15,492 | 49.56% | 693 | 2.21% | -415 | -1.33% | 31,262 |
| Seneca | 11,353 | 44.80% | 13,243 | 52.26% | 747 | 2.94% | -1,890 | -7.46% | 25,343 |
| Shelby | 6,343 | 26.54% | 17,142 | 71.71% | 418 | 1.75% | -10,799 | -45.17% | 23,903 |
| Stark | 89,432 | 49.21% | 88,581 | 48.74% | 3,733 | 2.05% | 851 | 0.47% | 181,746 |
| Summit | 153,041 | 57.03% | 111,001 | 41.36% | 4,316 | 1.61% | 42,040 | 15.67% | 268,358 |
| Trumbull | 61,672 | 60.48% | 38,279 | 37.54% | 2,012 | 1.98% | 23,393 | 22.94% | 101,963 |
| Tuscarawas | 18,407 | 44.15% | 22,242 | 53.35% | 1,044 | 2.50% | -3,835 | -9.20% | 41,693 |
| Union | 8,805 | 34.36% | 16,289 | 63.57% | 529 | 2.07% | -7,484 | -29.21% | 25,623 |
| Van Wert | 4,029 | 28.99% | 9,585 | 68.97% | 284 | 2.04% | -5,556 | -39.98% | 13,898 |
| Vinton | 2,436 | 44.37% | 2,856 | 52.02% | 198 | 3.61% | -420 | -7.65% | 5,490 |
| Warren | 32,909 | 29.60% | 76,564 | 68.85% | 1,724 | 1.55% | -43,655 | -39.25% | 111,197 |
| Washington | 11,651 | 39.36% | 17,284 | 58.39% | 667 | 2.25% | -5,633 | -19.03% | 29,602 |
| Wayne | 19,808 | 38.71% | 30,251 | 59.12% | 1,106 | 2.17% | -10,443 | -20.41% | 51,165 |
| Williams | 7,266 | 41.04% | 10,047 | 56.74% | 393 | 2.22% | -2,781 | -15.70% | 17,706 |
| Wood | 32,802 | 51.21% | 29,704 | 46.37% | 1,553 | 2.42% | 3,098 | 4.84% | 64,059 |
| Wyandot | 4,137 | 39.02% | 6,180 | 58.29% | 285 | 2.69% | -2,043 | -19.27% | 10,602 |
| Totals | 2,827,709 | 50.58% | 2,661,437 | 47.60% | 101,788 | 1.82% | 166,272 | 2.98% | 5,590,934 |

Counties that flipped from Democratic to Republican

- Belmont (largest city: Martins Ferry)
- Jefferson (largest city: Steubenville)
- Lake (largest city: Mentor)
- Monroe (largest city: Woodsfield)
- Tuscarawas (largest city: New Philadelphia)

==== By congressional district ====
Despite losing the state, Romney won 12 of 16 congressional districts.

| District | Romney | Obama | Representative |
|---|---|---|---|
| 1st | 52.4% | 46.26% | Steve Chabot |
| 2nd | 54.75% | 43.66% | Brad Wenstrup |
| 3rd | 28.9% | 69.65% | Joyce Beatty |
| 4th | 55.98% | 42% | Jim Jordan |
| 5th | 53.88% | 44.1% | Bob Latta |
| 6th | 55.2% | 42.67% | Bill Johnson |
| 7th | 53.71% | 44.23% | Bob Gibbs |
| 8th | 61.9% | 36.45% | John Boehner |
| 9th | 30.87% | 67.55% | Marcy Kaptur |
| 10th | 50.14% | 48.23% | Mike Turner |
| 11th | 16.55% | 82.74% | Marcia Fudge |
| 12th | 54.37% | 43.9% | Pat Tiberi |
| 13th | 35.42% | 62.95% | Tim Ryan |
| 14th | 50.89% | 47.58% | David Joyce |
| 15th | 51.86% | 46.34% | Steve Stivers |
| 16th | 53.35% | 45.19% | Jim Renacci |

== Analysis ==
Obama's victory in Ohio was enough to push him over the 270 electoral vote line to win the 2012 election. At first the Romney campaign contested the call, but conceded at about 1:00 A.M. President Obama's victory in the state can be attributed to several factors. Although he only won 17 out of Ohio's 88 counties, those 17 counties combined account for 56.56% of its total population. Obama's 2.98% margin of victory in Ohio in 2012 was a decrease from his 4.59% victory in 2008. As of 2026, he remains the last Democratic presidential nominee to win Ohio.

Romney did do well in most rural areas of the state, particularly in western Ohio. Romney also won all but one county in the Appalachia region, becoming the first Republican since Richard Nixon’s 2,900-plus-county landslide in 1972 to carry Belmont, Jefferson and Monroe Counties, and losing only Athens County, home of Ohio University. He also managed to flip the swing counties of Lake and Tuscarawas.

Romney also did well in the northern Columbus suburbs. For Romney, most of his wins came from smaller populated counties. Obama won by comfortable margins in Franklin, Hamilton, and Lucas counties, home to the cities of Columbus, Cincinnati, and Toledo, respectively. Obama's greatest support came from northeast Ohio, centered in Cuyahoga and Summit counties, home to the cities of Cleveland and Akron, respectively, the second and fourth largest cities in the state. The surrounding Cleveland–Akron–Canton metropolitan area and the Lake Erie shore went mostly to Obama, allowing him to carry the state as a whole by a modest 2.98% margin.

In February 2013, nineteen cases of voter fraud were investigated in Hamilton County. Three individuals were charged with voter fraud the following month, with one individual alleged to have voted six times. These incidents would not have affected the outcome of the Ohio race as President Obama ultimately carried the state by 166,272 votes. Some experts believe that the popularity of the auto industry bailout put in place under President Obama helped him take the state.

== See also ==
- United States presidential elections in Ohio
- 2012 United States presidential debates
- 2012 Republican Party presidential debates and forums
- 2012 Republican Party presidential primaries
- Results of the 2012 Republican Party presidential primaries
- Ohio Republican Party
