= 1964 United States presidential election in Ohio =

- November 3, 1964

Nominee	Lyndon B. Johnson	Barry Goldwater
Party	Democratic	Republican
Home state	Texas	Arizona
Running mate	Hubert Humphrey	William E. Miller
Electoral vote	26	0
Popular vote	2,498,331	1,470,865
Percentage	62.94%	37.06%
County results
Johnson
50–60%
60–70%
70–80%
Goldwater
50–60%
President before election
Lyndon B. Johnson
Democratic
Elected President
Lyndon B. Johnson
Democratic

The 1964 United States presidential election in Ohio was held on November 3, 1964, as part of the 1964 United States presidential election. Voters chose 26 representatives, or electors, to the Electoral College, who voted for President and Vice President.

Ohio was overwhelmingly won by the Democratic nominee, incumbent President Lyndon B. Johnson, who carried the state with 62.94% of the vote against Republican nominee Barry Goldwater's 37.06%. The 1964 election marked the best performance for the Democratic Party in the state, as it was the only time a Democratic candidate for president won it with over 60% of the popular vote (and the last time a nominee from either party has done so), the last time the Democratic candidate carried more counties than the Republican candidate, and the last time the margin of victory for the Democratic candidate was in double digits. This is also the only time where a presidential candidate in Ohio had a winning margin that exceeded one million votes.

This was also the first of 14 consecutive elections through 2016 in which the winning candidate always won Ohio.

This is the only time in which Clinton, Warren and Geauga counties have voted for a Democratic presidential candidate. Ashland, Auglaize, Butler, Champaign, Clermont, Crawford, Darke, Defiance, Fairfield, Fayette, Greene, Hardin, Henry, Highland, Holmes, Knox, Licking, Logan, Madison, Marion, Medina, Miami, Morgan, Morrow, Muskingum, Paulding, Pickaway, Preble, Putnam, Richland, Shelby, Van Wert, Washington, Wayne, Williams, and Wyandot counties have never voted Democratic since, while Franklin County did not vote Democratic again until 1996 and Hamilton County did not do so again until 2008.

== Results ==
1964 United States presidential election in Ohio
Party	Candidate	Running mate	Votes	Percentage	Electoral votes
Democratic	Lyndon B. Johnson	Hubert Humphrey	2,498,331	62.94%	26
Republican	Barry Goldwater	William E. Miller	1,470,865	37.06%	0
Totals			3,969,296	100.00%	26
Voter turnout (registered voters)					%

=== Results by county ===
County	Lyndon B. Johnson Democratic		Barry Goldwater Republican		Margin		Total votes cast
County	#	%	#	%	#	%	Total votes cast
Adams	5,005	57.48%	3,702	42.52%	1,303	14.96%	8,707
Allen	18,990	48.83%	19,897	51.17%	−907	−2.34%	38,887
Ashland	8,493	53.75%	7,308	46.25%	1,185	7.50%	15,801
Ashtabula	24,104	64.64%	13,183	35.36%	10,921	29.28%	37,287
Athens	10,633	63.13%	6,211	36.87%	4,422	26.26%	16,844
Auglaize	8,632	52.04%	7,954	47.96%	678	4.08%	16,586
Belmont	28,180	74.41%	9,693	25.59%	18,487	48.82%	37,873
Brown	6,983	64.14%	3,904	35.86%	3,079	28.28%	10,887
Butler	42,278	57.37%	31,413	42.63%	10,865	14.74%	73,691
Carroll	5,050	58.01%	3,655	41.99%	1,395	16.02%	8,705
Champaign	7,138	56.09%	5,588	43.91%	1,550	12.18%	12,726
Clark	34,275	64.20%	19,112	35.80%	15,163	28.40%	53,387
Clermont	16,523	55.28%	13,367	44.72%	3,156	10.56%	29,890
Clinton	6,514	51.71%	6,082	48.29%	432	3.42%	12,596
Columbiana	28,706	64.46%	15,827	35.54%	12,879	28.92%	44,533
Coshocton	8,382	58.42%	5,965	41.58%	2,417	16.84%	14,347
Crawford	11,968	57.16%	8,970	42.84%	2,998	14.32%	20,938
Cuyahoga	492,911	71.50%	196,436	28.50%	296,475	43.00%	689,347
Darke	12,433	59.17%	8,581	40.83%	3,852	18.34%	21,014
Defiance	8,707	63.30%	5,048	36.70%	3,659	26.60%	13,755
Delaware	8,080	49.04%	8,395	50.96%	−315	−1.92%	16,475
Erie	15,968	61.54%	9,981	38.46%	5,987	23.08%	25,949
Fairfield	15,611	57.62%	11,480	42.38%	4,131	15.24%	27,091
Fayette	6,128	57.30%	4,567	42.70%	1,561	14.60%	10,695
Franklin	154,527	54.05%	131,345	45.95%	23,182	8.10%	285,872
Fulton	5,604	48.41%	5,973	51.59%	−369	−3.18%	11,577
Gallia	4,740	51.81%	4,408	48.19%	332	3.62%	9,148
Geauga	12,212	56.45%	9,423	43.55%	2,789	12.90%	21,635
Greene	21,276	59.35%	14,571	40.65%	6,705	18.70%	35,847
Guernsey	9,503	59.65%	6,429	40.35%	3,074	19.30%	15,932
Hamilton	199,127	55.27%	161,179	44.73%	37,948	10.54%	360,306
Hancock	11,547	49.86%	11,610	50.14%	−63	−0.28%	23,157
Hardin	7,324	56.33%	5,679	43.67%	1,645	12.66%	13,003
Harrison	5,159	63.79%	2,928	36.21%	2,231	27.58%	8,087
Henry	5,845	53.43%	5,094	46.57%	751	6.86%	10,939
Highland	7,281	54.88%	5,985	45.12%	1,296	9.76%	13,266
Hocking	5,951	67.56%	2,858	32.44%	3,093	35.12%	8,809
Holmes	3,559	62.82%	2,106	37.18%	1,453	25.64%	5,665
Huron	10,780	58.48%	7,655	41.52%	3,125	16.96%	18,435
Jackson	7,056	58.78%	4,949	41.22%	2,107	17.56%	12,005
Jefferson	33,039	73.71%	11,784	26.29%	21,255	47.42%	44,823
Knox	11,222	60.73%	7,258	39.27%	3,964	21.46%	18,480
Lake	38,552	62.35%	23,282	37.65%	15,270	24.70%	61,834
Lawrence	12,635	61.96%	7,757	38.04%	4,878	23.92%	20,392
Licking	23,364	60.75%	15,096	39.25%	8,268	21.50%	38,460
Logan	8,484	55.94%	6,683	44.06%	1,801	11.88%	15,167
Lorain	55,755	67.63%	26,683	32.37%	29,072	35.26%	82,438
Lucas	128,110	68.92%	57,782	31.08%	70,328	37.84%	185,892
Madison	5,264	51.56%	4,945	48.44%	319	3.12%	10,209
Mahoning	90,934	72.92%	33,775	27.08%	57,159	45.84%	124,709
Marion	14,400	58.90%	10,050	41.10%	4,350	17.80%	24,450
Medina	14,729	59.03%	10,221	40.97%	4,508	18.06%	24,950
Meigs	5,133	56.37%	3,973	43.63%	1,160	12.74%	9,106
Mercer	10,081	69.75%	4,373	30.25%	5,708	39.50%	14,454
Miami	19,379	59.88%	12,985	40.12%	6,394	19.76%	32,364
Monroe	4,776	71.07%	1,944	28.93%	2,832	42.14%	6,720
Montgomery	126,633	63.76%	71,979	36.24%	54,654	27.52%	198,612
Morgan	3,053	57.24%	2,281	42.76%	772	14.48%	5,334
Morrow	4,572	52.16%	4,194	47.84%	378	4.32%	8,766
Muskingum	20,792	64.12%	11,635	35.88%	9,157	28.24%	32,427
Noble	2,925	56.52%	2,250	43.48%	675	13.04%	5,175
Ottawa	9,618	63.04%	5,639	36.96%	3,979	26.08%	15,257
Paulding	4,465	57.84%	3,254	42.16%	1,211	15.68%	7,719
Perry	7,816	66.74%	3,895	33.26%	3,921	33.48%	11,711
Pickaway	7,310	57.89%	5,317	42.11%	1,993	15.78%	12,627
Pike	5,331	67.50%	2,567	32.50%	2,764	35.00%	7,898
Portage	23,308	68.25%	10,842	31.75%	12,466	36.50%	34,150
Preble	7,574	56.47%	5,839	43.53%	1,735	12.94%	13,413
Putnam	7,014	57.33%	5,221	42.67%	1,793	14.66%	12,235
Richland	24,799	56.84%	18,833	43.16%	5,966	13.68%	43,632
Ross	12,704	56.90%	9,623	43.10%	3,081	13.80%	22,327
Sandusky	13,481	62.02%	8,254	37.98%	5,227	24.04%	21,735
Scioto	21,559	61.55%	13,465	38.45%	8,094	23.10%	35,024
Seneca	14,518	60.36%	9,536	39.64%	4,982	20.72%	24,054
Shelby	10,004	65.84%	5,190	34.16%	4,814	31.68%	15,194
Stark	88,704	62.32%	53,632	37.68%	35,072	24.64%	142,336
Summit	142,319	67.67%	68,000	32.33%	74,319	35.34%	210,319
Trumbull	54,342	66.76%	27,059	33.24%	27,283	33.52%	81,401
Tuscarawas	23,623	70.34%	9,962	29.66%	13,661	40.68%	33,585
Union	4,985	47.53%	5,504	52.47%	−519	−4.94%	10,489
Van Wert	7,695	55.40%	6,194	44.60%	1,501	10.80%	13,889
Vinton	2,618	57.70%	1,919	42.30%	699	15.40%	4,537
Warren	12,406	53.04%	10,982	46.96%	1,424	6.08%	23,388
Washington	11,193	55.78%	8,873	44.22%	2,320	11.56%	20,066
Wayne	14,806	59.95%	9,890	40.05%	4,916	19.90%	24,696
Williams	7,547	57.17%	5,653	42.83%	1,894	14.34%	13,200
Wood	16,304	57.32%	12,142	42.68%	4,162	14.64%	28,446
Wyandot	5,273	56.02%	4,139	43.98%	1,134	12.04%	9,412
Totals	2,498,331	62.94%	1,470,865	37.06%	1,027,466	25.88%	3,969,196

County Flips: Democratic Hold Gain from Republican / Republican Hold

==== Counties that flipped from Republican to Democratic ====
- Adams
- Ashland
- Ashtabula
- Athens
- Auglaize
- Brown
- Butler
- Carroll
- Champaign
- Clark
- Clermont
- Clinton
- Columbiana
- Coshocton
- Crawford
- Darke
- Defiance
- Erie
- Fairfield
- Fayette
- Franklin
- Gallia
- Geauga
- Greene
- Guernsey
- Hamilton
- Hardin
- Harrison
- Henry
- Highland
- Hocking
- Holmes
- Huron
- Jackson
- Knox
- Lawrence
- Licking
- Logan
- Madison
- Marion
- Medina
- Meigs
- Mercer
- Miami
- Monroe
- Montgomery
- Morgan
- Morrow
- Muskingum
- Noble
- Ottawa
- Paulding
- Perry
- Pickaway
- Portage
- Preble
- Putnam
- Richland
- Ross
- Sandusky
- Scioto
- Seneca
- Shelby
- Stark
- Tuscarawas
- Van Wert
- Vinton
- Warren
- Washington
- Wayne
- Williams
- Wood
- Wyandot

== See also ==
- United States presidential elections in Ohio
