= 2016 United States presidential election in Ohio =

- November 8, 2016
- Turnout: 71.33% (▲0.79 pp)

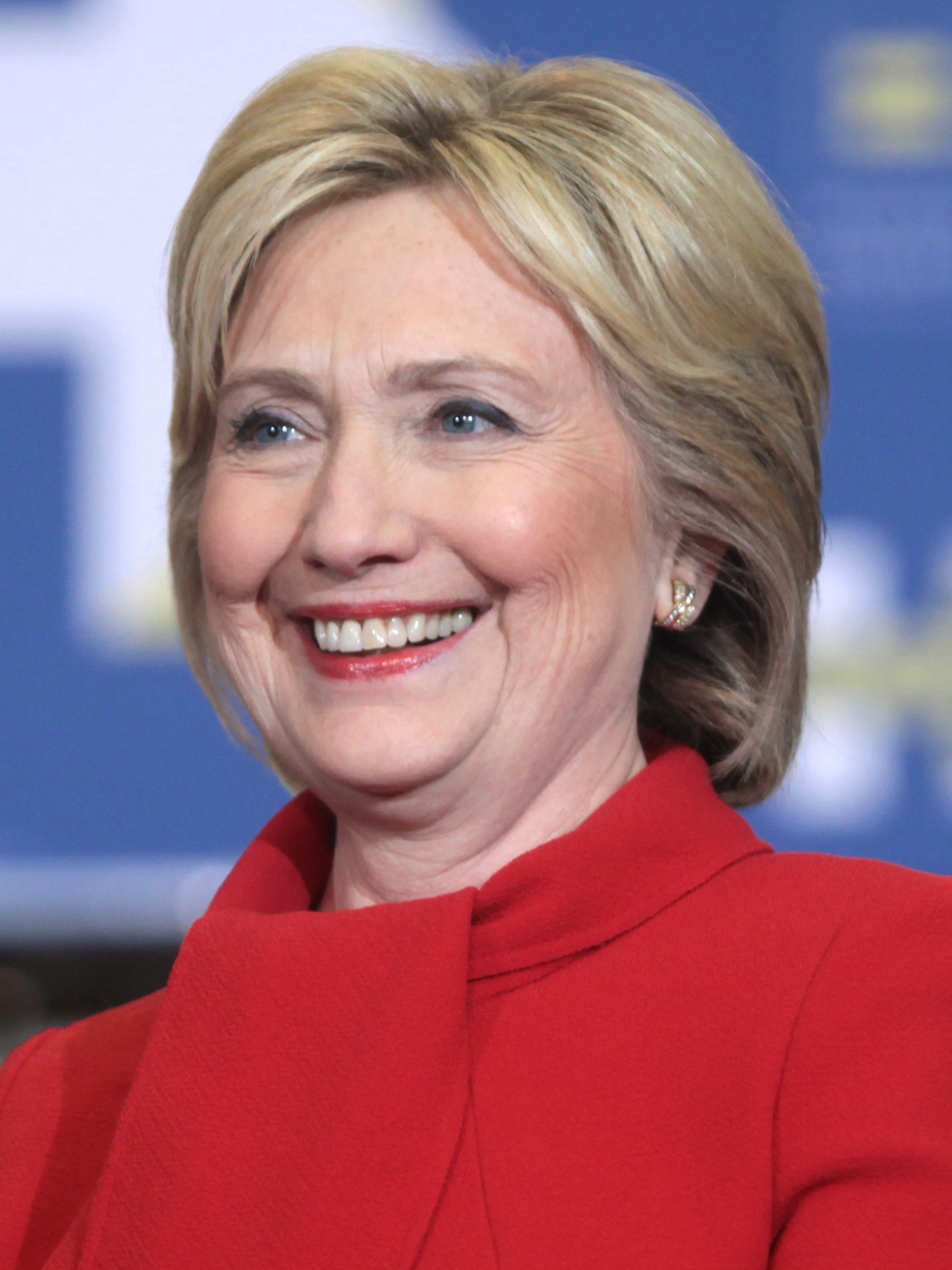
Nominee	Donald Trump	Hillary Clinton
Party	Republican	Democratic
Home state	New York	New York
Running mate	Mike Pence	Tim Kaine
Electoral vote	18	0
Popular vote	2,841,005	2,394,164
Percentage	51.69%	43.56%

Trump
40–50%
50–60%
60–70%
70–80%
80–90%
90–100%
Clinton
40–50%
50–60%
60–70%
70–80%
80–90%
90–100%
Tie
40–50%
President before election
Barack Obama
Democratic
Elected President
Donald Trump
Republican

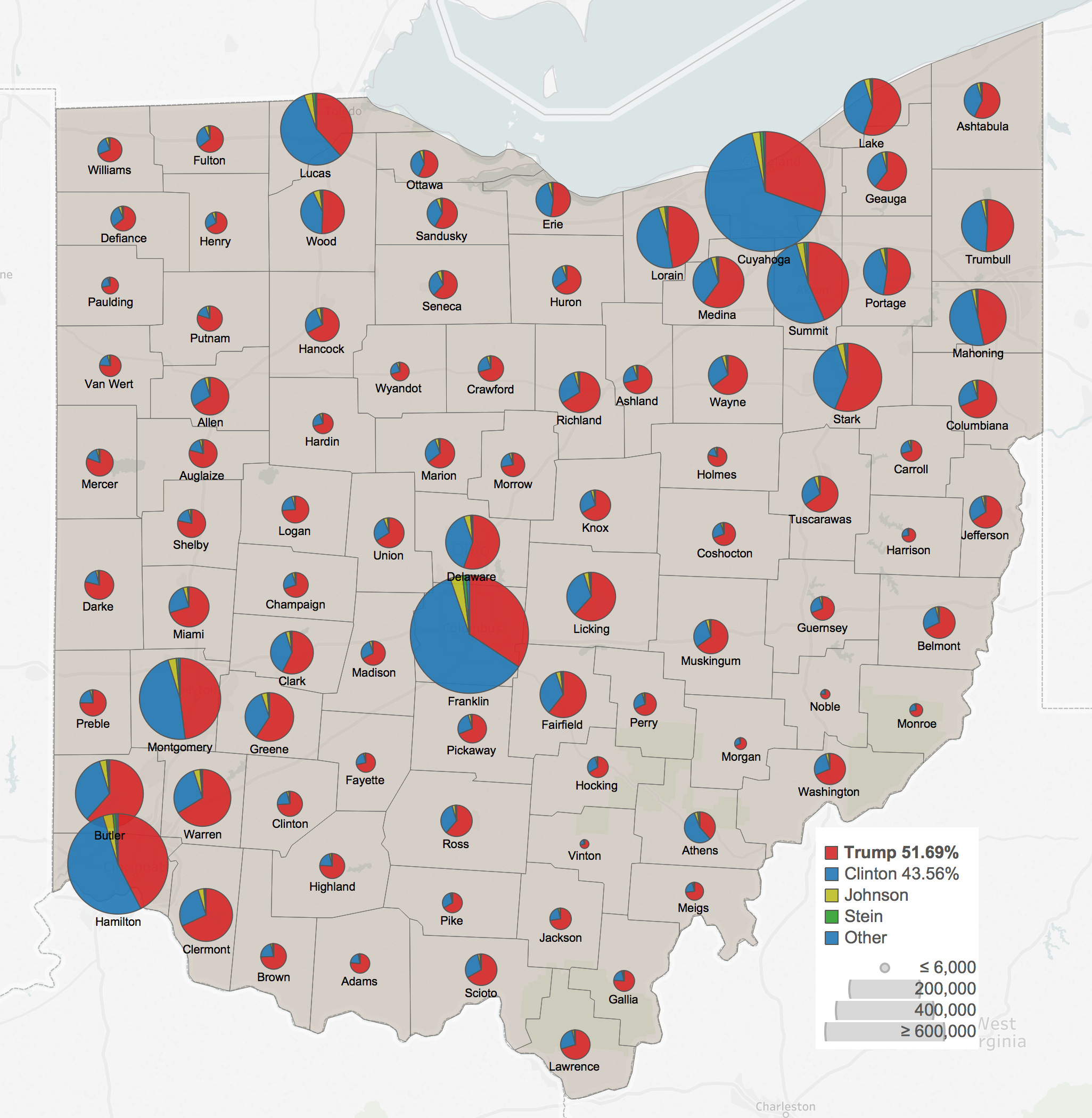
Results by county showing number of votes by size and candidates by color

Treemap of the popular vote by county

The 2016 United States presidential election in Ohio was held on Tuesday, November 8, 2016, as part of the 2016 United States presidential election in which all 50 states plus the District of Columbia participated. Ohio voters chose electors to represent them in the Electoral College via a popular vote, pitting the Republican Party's nominee, businessman Donald Trump, and running mate Indiana Governor Mike Pence against Democratic Party nominee, former Secretary of State Hillary Clinton, and her running mate Virginia Senator Tim Kaine. Ohio had 18 electoral votes in the Electoral College.

The 2016 election marked a turning point for Ohio, which had long been a swing state but was won by Trump by a margin of 8.07 points. Prior to the election, most news organizations considered Ohio as a close state leaning Republican, due to Trump's appeal to blue-collar voters in the Rust Belt. However, on election day Trump significantly overperformed expectations, with Clinton winning just 8 counties to Trump's 80. Ohio kept its streak of voting for the winner as a bellwether state since 1964, as it voted for Trump, who won nationally. Having previously voted Democratic in 2012 and 2008, the winning margin was the second largest of the states Trump flipped red, after Iowa.

This also marked the largest margin of victory since George H. W. Bush defeated Michael Dukakis in the state in 1988. In 2024, Trump surpassed Bush's 1988 margin, winning the state by double digits while running with Ohio native JD Vance. As of the 2024 presidential election, this is the last time Mahoning and Lorain counties voted for the Democratic candidate and the last time Montgomery county voted for the Republican candidate.

== Primary elections ==
=== Republican primary ===
==== Results ====
Ohio Republican primary, March 15, 2016
Candidate	Votes	Percentage	Actual delegate count		
Candidate	Votes	Percentage	Bound	Unbound	Total
John Kasich	933,886	46.95%	66	0	66
Donald Trump	713,404	35.87%	0	0	0
Ted Cruz	264,640	13.31%	0	0	0
Marco Rubio	46,478	2.34%	0	0	0
Ben Carson (withdrawn)	14,351	0.72%	0	0	0
Jeb Bush (withdrawn)	5,398	0.27%	0	0	0
Mike Huckabee (withdrawn)	4,941	0.25%	0	0	0
Chris Christie (withdrawn)	2,430	0.12%	0	0	0
Carly Fiorina (withdrawn)	2,112	0.11%	0	0	0
Rick Santorum (withdrawn)	1,320	0.07%	0	0	0
Unprojected delegates:			0	0	0
Total:	1,988,960	100.00%	66	0	66
Source: The Green Papers

=== Democratic primary ===
The Democratic Party's presidential primaries in Ohio were held on March 15, 2016, concurrently with primaries in Florida, Illinois, Missouri and North Carolina. The state's 143 pledged delegates to the 2016 Democratic National Convention were rewarded proportionally according to the statewide vote total. Three candidates appeared on the ballot for the primary – former Secretary of State Hillary Clinton, Senator Bernie Sanders and businessman Rocky De La Fuente.

==== Background ====
By the time Ohio held its primaries, voters from 21 states and two territories already cast their vote for the presidential nomination of the Democratic Party. As of the March 12 elections, Hillary Clinton was projected to have earned 775 pledged delegates to Bernie Sanders' 552. Clinton gained significant victories in the Southern United States, often described as her "firewall", including landslide victories in Mississippi and Alabama and Georgia. In contrast, Bernie Sanders managed to gain victories in the Midwestern United States, where Ohio resides, including an upset victory in neighboring Michigan on March 8. After the fact, Sanders' campaign took advantage of the momentum gained from the Michigan win, by targeting Illinois, Missouri and Ohio in the March 15 elections, hoping to repeat the same result. Sanders stated that "Not only is Michigan the gateway to the rest of the industrial Midwest, the results there show that we are a national campaign."

Before the Michigan primaries, Clinton and Sanders had debated over economic policies relating to the industrial Midwest states and the so-called "rust belt". The disagreements centered around trade deals, including the Trans-Pacific Partnership and Clinton's past support of the North American Free Trade Agreement, and its effect on economies such as Michigan and Ohio.

==== Controversy ====
Ohio is one of at least seventeen states that has laws allowing voters who are 17 years of age, but will be 18 by the time of the general election, to vote in the presidential primaries. However, Ohio Secretary of State Jon A. Husted had announced in December 2015 that 17 year olds would be outright barred from participating in the 2016 primaries. The rationale for the decision was based on an interpretation of the law in which 17 year olds could "nominate" officials for office, but not "elect". In the case of the presidential primaries, by definition, voters would be electing officials – delegates to each party's presidential nominating convention. The decision was met with criticism by the public, after it was brought to mainstream attention by Representative Kathleen Clyde, after she condemned the rule in a statement released on March 5. Clyde described it as a "underhanded, backroom attack" against young voters. Nine teenagers filed a lawsuit with the Ohio Courts of Common Pleas in Franklin County over the decision, stating that the decision contradicted state law and a decision by the Supreme Court of the United States that allowed 17 year olds turning 18 by the general election to vote.

Bernie Sanders' campaign, whose voter base includes the majority of young voters, also filed a lawsuit against the decision, accusing Husted of "arbitrarily" and "unconsititutionally" discriminating against young African-American and Latino voters, citing data from the 2010 United States census that shows younger voters in Ohio were mostly African-American and Latino. Husted, in response to Sanders' lawsuit, said in a public statement that he welcomed the lawsuit, further stating that "I am very happy to be sued on this issue because the law is crystal clear", though, he later spoke out negatively against the lawsuit, claiming that it was "a last-minute political act", designed to "draw attention to his campaign." Many Ohio officials, past and present, such as former Ohio Secretary of State Jennifer Brunner, came out in support of Sanders' lawsuit, and had attracted protests by not only Bernie Sanders supporters, but also Donald Trump supporters as well. In a decision handed down on March 11, an Ohio state judge ruled in favor of both lawsuits by the teenage group and the Sanders campaign, effectively lifting the ban on 17 year olds from voting in the Ohio presidential primaries. Husted initially announced that he would appeal the ruling, however, after learning that such an appeal would not be heard by the court until the day before the primaries, he retracted his intent to appeal.

==== Forums ====
March 13, 2016 – Columbus, Ohio

The ninth forum was held at 8:00 pm EDT on March 13, 2016, at the campus of Ohio State University in Columbus, Ohio, and aired on CNN.

March 14, 2016 – Columbus, Ohio and Springfield, Illinois

The tenth forum was held at 6:00 pm EDT on March 14, 2016, at the campus of Ohio State University in Columbus, Ohio, and at the Old State Capitol State Historic Site (Illinois) in Springfield, Illinois. It aired on MSNBC. The first section of the town hall with Bernie Sanders was moderated by Chuck Todd; the second section of the town hall with Hillary Clinton was moderated by Chris Matthews.

==== Results ====
Ohio Democratic primary, March 15, 2016
Candidate	Popular vote		Estimated delegates		
Candidate	Count	Percentage	Pledged	Unpledged	Total
Hillary Clinton	696,681	56.12%	81	14	95
Bernie Sanders	535,395	43.13%	62	1	63
Rocky De La Fuente	9,402	0.76%			
Uncommitted	—N/a			2	2
Total	1,241,478	100%	143	17	160

=== Green state convention ===
The Green Party of Ohio participated in the March 15 primaries in Ohio, though they did not hold their presidential primary during the event. Instead, delegates to the Green National Convention were awarded based on presidential preference through a nominating convention in Columbus on April 3. Members of the Green Party of Ohio were able to vote in the convention.

Ohio Green Party presidential convention, April 3, 2016
Candidate	Votes	Percentage	National delegates
Jill Stein	–	61%	6
William Kreml	–	19%	2
Sedinam Moyowasifza-Curry	–	12%	1
Darryl Cherney	–	5%	–
Kent Mesplay	–	3%	–
Total	-	100.00%	9

== Republican National Convention ==
From July 17 through the 20th, Cleveland hosted the Republican Convention, which nominated Donald Trump and Mike Pence.

== General election ==
=== Polling ===
Until September 2016, Hillary Clinton won or tied in the vast majority of polls, with Trump only winning 2 polls before September. However, on September 7, Trump won his first statewide poll in 4 months by 46% to 45%. Subsequently, in September, Republican nominee Donald Trump took a lead in Ohio polls, winning every poll but one. In the beginning of October, Clinton regained a narrow lead, but after October 12, every poll except one ended with Trump winning or a tie. The average of the final three polls showed Trump leading 46% to 44%. The final poll showed Trump ahead 46% to 39%, which was accurate compared to the results. Trump particularly gained in Appalachian Ohio compared to the prior election.

=== Predictions ===
The following are final 2016 predictions from various organizations for Ohio as of election day.

Source	Ranking	As of
Los Angeles Times	Lean D	November 6, 2016
CNN	Lean R (flip)	November 8, 2016
Rothenberg Political Report	Tossup	November 7, 2016
Sabato's Crystal Ball	Lean R (flip)	November 7, 2016
NBC	Tossup	November 7, 2016
Electoral-vote.com	Lean R (flip)	November 8, 2016
RealClearPolitics	Tossup	November 7, 2016
Fox News	Lean R (flip)	November 7, 2016
ABC	Lean R (flip)	November 7, 2016

=== Results ===
State Senate district results

Official state results from the Ohio Secretary of State are as follows

2016 United States presidential election in Ohio
Party	Candidate	Running Mate	Votes	Percentage	Electoral votes
Republican	Donald Trump	Mike Pence	2,841,006	51.31%	18
Democratic	Hillary Clinton	Tim Kaine	2,394,169	43.24%	0
Independent	Gary Johnson	William Weld	174,498	3.15%	0
Green	Jill Stein	Ajamu Baraka	46,271	0.84%	0
Nonparty	Richard Duncan	Ricky Johnson	24,235	0.44%	0
Write-ins	Write-ins	Write-ins	56,368	1.02%	0
Totals			5,536,547	100.00%	18

==== By county ====
County	Donald Trump Republican		Hillary Clinton Democratic		Gary Johnson Nonparty		Jill Stein Green		Richard Duncan Nonparty		Various candidates Other parties		Margin		Total votes cast
County	#	%	#	%	#	%	#	%	#	%	#	%	#	%	Total votes cast
Adams	8,659	75.88%	2,326	20.38%	226	1.98%	47	0.41%	62	0.54%	92	0.80%	6,333	55.50%	11,412
Allen	30,487	65.94%	13,294	28.75%	1,486	3.21%	323	0.70%	225	0.49%	419	0.91%	17,193	37.19%	46,234
Ashland	17,493	70.72%	5,740	23.20%	906	3.66%	185	0.75%	183	0.74%	230	0.93%	11,753	47.52%	24,737
Ashtabula	23,318	56.62%	15,577	37.83%	1,213	2.95%	427	1.04%	271	0.66%	374	0.90%	7,741	18.79%	41,180
Athens	11,354	38.22%	16,370	55.10%	1,012	3.41%	539	1.81%	130	0.44%	304	1.03%	−5,016	−16.88%	29,709
Auglaize	18,658	78.41%	3,980	16.73%	701	2.95%	112	0.47%	132	0.55%	211	0.89%	14,678	61.68%	23,794
Belmont	21,108	67.37%	8,785	28.04%	777	2.48%	195	0.62%	214	0.68%	252	0.80%	12,323	39.33%	31,331
Brown	14,573	74.04%	4,353	22.12%	431	2.19%	103	0.52%	95	0.48%	127	0.64%	10,220	51.92%	19,682
Butler	106,976	61.13%	58,642	33.51%	5,790	3.31%	1,173	0.67%	566	0.32%	1,847	1.05%	48,334	27.62%	174,994
Carroll	9,254	70.38%	3,154	23.99%	450	3.42%	91	0.69%	86	0.65%	113	0.86%	6,100	46.39%	13,148
Champaign	12,631	69.24%	4,594	25.18%	582	3.19%	147	0.81%	104	0.57%	185	1.01%	8,037	44.06%	18,243
Clark	35,205	56.88%	23,328	37.69%	1,895	3.06%	511	0.83%	326	0.53%	628	1.01%	11,877	19.19%	61,893
Clermont	67,518	67.54%	26,715	26.72%	3,504	3.50%	728	0.73%	321	0.32%	1,186	1.19%	40,803	40.82%	99,972
Clinton	13,838	73.74%	4,066	21.67%	514	2.74%	127	0.68%	80	0.43%	141	0.75%	9,772	52.07%	18,766
Columbiana	31,676	68.13%	12,432	26.74%	1,401	3.01%	320	0.69%	228	0.49%	435	0.94%	19,244	41.39%	46,492
Coshocton	10,785	68.87%	4,013	25.63%	468	2.99%	118	0.75%	115	0.73%	160	1.02%	6,772	43.24%	15,659
Crawford	13,611	70.42%	4,625	23.93%	714	3.69%	119	0.62%	121	0.63%	139	0.72%	8,986	46.49%	19,329
Cuyahoga	184,212	30.25%	398,276	65.41%	12,993	2.13%	5,242	0.86%	1,878	0.31%	6,278	1.03%	−214,064	−35.16%	608,879
Darke	20,012	78.17%	4,470	17.46%	649	2.54%	149	0.58%	123	0.48%	198	0.78%	15,542	60.71%	25,601
Defiance	11,688	63.70%	5,368	29.26%	782	4.26%	153	0.83%	128	0.70%	230	1.26%	6,320	34.44%	18,349
Delaware	57,568	54.50%	40,872	38.69%	4,116	3.90%	668	0.63%	333	0.32%	2,082	1.97%	16,696	15.81%	105,639
Erie	19,648	51.89%	16,057	42.41%	1,225	3.24%	342	0.90%	229	0.60%	361	0.96%	3,591	9.48%	37,862
Fairfield	44,314	60.25%	24,881	33.83%	2,439	3.32%	558	0.76%	373	0.51%	989	1.35%	19,433	26.42%	73,554
Fayette	7,995	71.18%	2,739	24.39%	295	2.63%	57	0.51%	50	0.45%	96	0.85%	5,256	46.79%	11,232
Franklin	199,331	33.93%	351,198	59.78%	19,725	3.36%	6,106	1.04%	1,866	0.32%	9,298	1.58%	−151,867	−25.85%	587,524
Fulton	13,709	64.20%	6,069	28.42%	1,024	4.80%	167	0.78%	139	0.65%	245	1.15%	7,640	35.78%	21,353
Gallia	9,822	75.53%	2,628	20.21%	285	2.19%	98	0.75%	83	0.64%	88	0.68%	7,194	55.32%	13,004
Geauga	30,227	59.66%	17,569	34.68%	1,502	2.96%	333	0.66%	228	0.45%	803	1.59%	12,658	24.98%	50,662
Greene	48,540	58.53%	28,943	34.90%	3,277	3.95%	680	0.82%	302	0.36%	1,195	1.44%	19,597	23.63%	82,937
Guernsey	11,445	68.75%	4,359	26.18%	549	3.30%	99	0.59%	84	0.50%	111	0.67%	7,086	42.57%	16,647
Hamilton	173,665	42.45%	215,719	52.73%	13,200	3.23%	3,723	0.91%	1,211	0.30%	1,591	0.39%	−42,054	−10.28%	409,109
Hancock	24,183	66.74%	9,609	26.52%	1,535	4.24%	319	0.88%	217	0.60%	371	1.03%	14,574	40.22%	36,234
Hardin	8,717	70.56%	2,920	23.64%	465	3.76%	80	0.65%	79	0.64%	93	0.75%	5,797	46.92%	12,354
Harrison	5,098	71.75%	1,688	23.76%	178	2.51%	53	0.75%	50	0.70%	38	0.53%	3,410	47.99%	7,105
Henry	9,301	66.19%	3,756	26.73%	659	4.69%	111	0.79%	99	0.70%	127	0.91%	5,545	39.46%	14,053
Highland	14,020	75.43%	3,773	20.30%	473	2.54%	103	0.55%	92	0.49%	127	0.69%	10,247	55.13%	18,588
Hocking	8,497	65.72%	3,775	29.20%	367	2.84%	90	0.70%	82	0.63%	118	0.91%	4,722	36.52%	12,929
Holmes	8,720	78.52%	1,788	16.10%	374	3.37%	53	0.48%	62	0.56%	109	0.98%	6,932	62.42%	11,106
Huron	16,226	64.90%	7,192	28.77%	923	3.69%	192	0.77%	244	0.98%	225	0.90%	9,034	36.13%	25,002
Jackson	9,949	72.22%	3,226	23.42%	373	2.71%	64	0.46%	75	0.54%	89	0.64%	6,723	48.80%	13,776
Jefferson	21,117	65.15%	9,675	29.85%	841	2.59%	194	0.60%	196	0.60%	388	1.19%	11,442	35.30%	32,411
Knox	19,131	66.14%	8,171	28.25%	936	3.24%	208	0.72%	164	0.57%	317	1.10%	10,960	37.89%	28,927
Lake	64,255	54.83%	46,397	39.59%	3,833	3.27%	946	0.81%	522	0.45%	1,237	1.06%	17,858	15.24%	117,190
Lawrence	18,689	69.76%	6,974	26.03%	589	2.20%	160	0.60%	142	0.53%	235	0.88%	11,715	43.73%	26,789
Licking	51,241	61.28%	27,376	32.74%	2,708	3.24%	725	0.87%	462	0.55%	1,112	1.33%	23,865	28.54%	83,624
Logan	15,957	73.49%	4,647	21.40%	657	3.03%	129	0.59%	127	0.58%	195	0.89%	11,310	52.09%	21,712
Lorain	66,818	47.54%	66,949	47.63%	4,548	3.24%	1,255	0.89%	735	0.52%	257	0.18%	−131	−0.09%	140,562
Lucas	75,698	38.07%	110,833	55.74%	7,410	3.73%	2,252	1.13%	1,780	0.43%	506	0.89%	−35,135	−17.67%	198,830
Madison	11,631	66.76%	4,779	27.43%	600	3.44%	110	0.63%	85	0.49%	216	1.23%	6,852	39.33%	17,421
Mahoning	53,616	46.23%	57,381	49.48%	2,606	2.25%	874	0.75%	431	0.37%	1,063	0.92%	−3,765	−3.25%	115,971
Marion	16,961	64.06%	7,928	29.94%	986	3.72%	238	0.90%	158	0.60%	207	0.78%	9,033	34.12%	26,478
Medina	54,810	59.47%	32,182	34.92%	2,975	3.23%	709	0.77%	395	0.43%	1,092	1.19%	22,628	24.55%	92,163
Meigs	7,309	72.79%	2,260	22.51%	280	2.79%	66	0.66%	63	0.63%	63	0.63%	5,049	50.28%	10,041
Mercer	17,506	80.24%	3,384	15.51%	562	2.58%	110	0.50%	120	0.55%	134	0.61%	14,122	64.73%	21,816
Miami	37,079	69.84%	13,120	24.71%	1,837	3.46%	315	0.59%	229	0.43%	514	0.96%	23,959	45.13%	53,094
Monroe	4,868	71.03%	1,662	24.25%	162	2.36%	36	0.53%	64	0.93%	61	0.89%	3,206	46.78%	6,853
Montgomery	123,909	47.68%	122,016	46.95%	8,387	3.23%	2,282	0.88%	905	0.35%	2,377	0.91%	1,893	0.73%	259,876
Morgan	4,431	68.41%	1,736	26.80%	192	2.96%	45	0.69%	37	0.57%	36	0.55%	2,695	41.61%	6,477
Morrow	11,948	71.60%	3,761	22.54%	569	3.41%	102	0.61%	101	0.61%	207	1.22%	8,187	49.06%	16,688
Muskingum	24,056	64.59%	11,123	29.86%	1,244	3.34%	261	0.70%	240	0.64%	321	0.86%	12,933	34.73%	37,245
Noble	4,549	75.33%	1,221	20.22%	152	2.52%	34	0.56%	53	0.88%	30	0.50%	3,328	55.11%	6,039
Ottawa	12,653	56.52%	8,285	37.01%	957	4.28%	147	0.66%	140	0.63%	203	0.91%	4,368	19.51%	22,385
Paulding	6,500	71.47%	2,093	23.01%	279	3.07%	78	0.86%	78	0.86%	67	0.74%	4,407	48.71%	9,095
Perry	10,228	67.73%	4,138	27.40%	405	2.68%	103	0.68%	105	0.70%	122	0.81%	6,090	40.33%	15,101
Pickaway	17,076	68.55%	6,529	26.21%	756	3.03%	180	0.72%	114	0.46%	257	1.03%	10,547	42.34%	24,912
Pike	7,902	66.12%	3,539	29.61%	283	2.37%	58	0.49%	83	0.69%	86	0.72%	4,363	36.51%	11,951
Portage	39,971	52.07%	32,397	42.20%	2,415	3.15%	840	1.09%	411	0.54%	728	0.95%	7,574	9.87%	76,762
Preble	15,446	74.69%	4,325	20.91%	553	2.67%	126	0.61%	102	0.49%	129	0.62%	11,121	53.78%	20,681
Putnam	14,961	79.34%	2,922	15.50%	638	3.38%	72	0.38%	119	0.63%	145	0.77%	12,039	63.84%	18,857
Richland	36,590	66.02%	16,085	29.02%	1,637	2.95%	387	0.70%	353	0.64%	372	0.67%	20,505	37.00%	55,424
Ross	18,652	61.02%	10,356	33.88%	934	3.06%	209	0.68%	163	0.53%	251	0.83%	8,296	27.14%	30,565
Sandusky	16,316	57.68%	9,929	35.10%	1,263	4.47%	311	1.10%	190	0.67%	276	0.97%	6,387	22.58%	28,285
Scioto	20,550	66.28%	9,132	29.46%	699	2.25%	217	0.70%	165	0.53%	240	0.78%	11,418	36.82%	31,003
Seneca	14,825	61.30%	7,404	30.62%	1,302	5.38%	242	1.00%	187	0.77%	223	0.92%	7,421	30.68%	24,183
Shelby	18,590	78.01%	4,243	17.81%	594	2.49%	125	0.52%	132	0.55%	145	0.61%	14,347	60.20%	23,829
Stark	98,388	55.85%	68,146	38.68%	5,693	3.23%	1,393	0.79%	1,062	0.60%	1,483	0.84%	30,242	17.17%	176,165
Summit	112,026	43.03%	134,256	51.57%	7,472	2.87%	2,330	0.89%	1,041	0.40%	3,221	1.23%	−22,230	−8.54%	260,346
Trumbull	49,024	50.71%	43,014	44.49%	2,489	2.57%	849	0.88%	535	0.55%	765	0.79%	6,010	6.22%	96,676
Tuscarawas	26,918	64.70%	12,188	29.29%	1,606	3.86%	287	0.69%	261	0.63%	346	0.83%	14,730	35.41%	41,606
Union	18,096	65.34%	7,718	27.87%	1,119	4.04%	207	0.75%	121	0.44%	434	1.57%	10,378	37.47%	27,695
Van Wert	10,469	76.03%	2,697	19.59%	429	3.12%	105	0.76%	69	0.50%	1	0.01%	7,772	56.44%	13,770
Vinton	3,883	70.09%	1,351	24.39%	168	3.03%	43	0.78%	57	1.03%	38	0.69%	2,532	45.70%	5,540
Warren	77,643	65.63%	33,730	28.51%	4,335	3.66%	715	0.60%	341	0.29%	1,545	1.31%	43,913	37.12%	118,309
Washington	20,514	68.07%	8,026	26.63%	892	2.96%	208	0.69%	184	0.61%	313	1.04%	12,488	41.44%	30,137
Wayne	32,270	64.26%	15,031	29.93%	1,624	3.23%	379	0.75%	312	0.62%	601	1.19%	17,239	34.33%	50,217
Williams	11,939	68.98%	4,358	25.18%	703	4.06%	130	0.75%	131	0.76%	47	0.27%	7,581	43.80%	17,308
Wood	32,498	50.13%	27,318	42.14%	3,264	5.04%	689	1.06%	344	0.53%	713	1.10%	5,180	7.99%	64,826
Wyandot	7,468	70.20%	2,515	23.64%	437	4.11%	85	0.80%	63	0.59%	70	0.66%	4,953	46.56%	10,638
Totals	2,841,006	51.31%	2,394,169	43.24%	174,498	3.15%	46,271	0.84%	24,235	0.44%	56,368	1.02%	446,837	8.07%	5,536,547

Counties that flipped from Democratic to Republican

- Ashtabula (largest city: Ashtabula)
- Erie (largest city: Sandusky)
- Montgomery (largest city: Dayton)
- Ottawa (largest city: Port Clinton)
- Portage (largest city: Kent)
- Sandusky (largest city: Fremont)
- Stark (largest city: Canton)
- Trumbull (largest city: Warren)
- Wood (largest city: Bowling Green)

==== By congressional district ====
Trump won 12 of 16 congressional districts.

District	Trump	Clinton	Representative
1st	51%	45%	Steve Chabot
2nd	56%	40%	Brad Wenstrup
3rd	29%	67%	Joyce Beatty
4th	64%	31%	Jim Jordan
5th	60%	35%	Bob Latta
6th	69%	27%	Bill Johnson
7th	62%	33%	Bob Gibbs
8th	65%	31%	Warren Davidson
9th	37%	59%	Marcy Kaptur
10th	51%	44%	Mike Turner
11th	17%	81%	Marcia Fudge
12th	53%	42%	Pat Tiberi
13th	45%	51%	Tim Ryan
14th	54%	42%	David Joyce
15th	55%	40%	Steve Stivers
16th	56%	39%	Jim Renacci

== Analysis ==
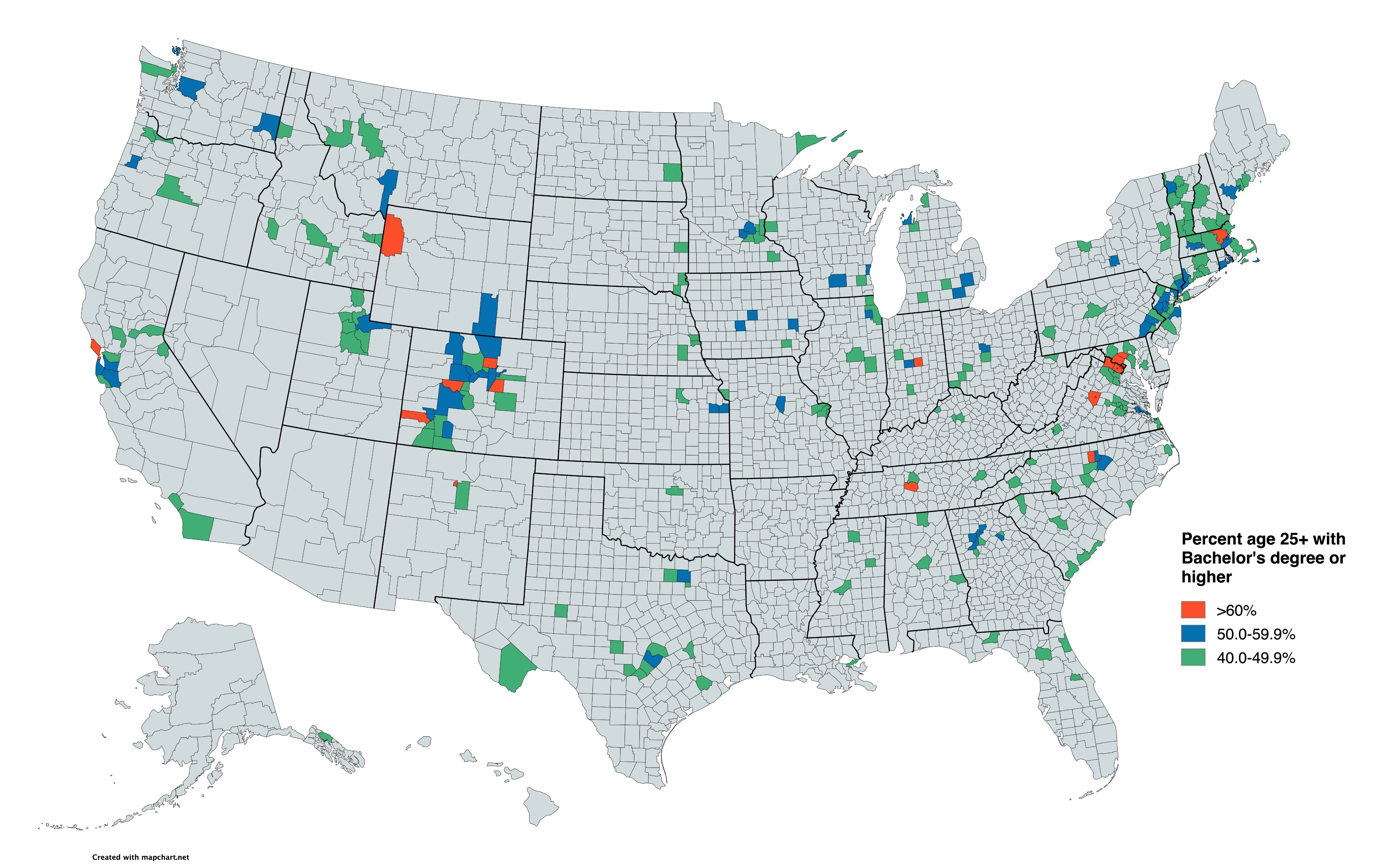
A map of the most college-educated counties in the United States

Some of the largest swings in the country against Clinton were in Ohio. Trump made massive gains in Appalachian Ohio, with some counties seeing swings upwards of 30% in margin. Clinton made some gains in heavily college-educated counties, particularly Delaware County, Ohio. These gains were no match for Trump's gains in the rest of the state.

At the time, Trump won Ohio by the largest margin for a Republican since 1988. Trump would later win the state by double digits in 2024, surpassing the 1988 margin. Additionally, Trump became the first Republican to win the presidency without carrying Hamilton County since Rutherford B. Hayes in 1876. Ohio was 10.2% more Republican than the national average in 2016, the farthest it had voted from the rest of the nation since 1932. Like all of its neighboring states except for longtime Republican state Indiana, Ohio was one of eleven states to vote for Bill Clinton twice in 1992 and 1996, only to be lost by Hillary Clinton in 2016.

This was the first time since 1988 that Erie, Montgomery, and Portage counties voted for a Republican presidential candidate. Ashtabula County did so for the first time since 1984, and Trumbull County since 1972. This is the last election in which Montgomery County voted for the Republican candidate, and the last in which Lorain and Mahoning County voted for the Democratic candidate.

== See also ==
- United States presidential elections in Ohio
- First presidency of Donald Trump
- 2016 Democratic Party presidential debates and forums
- 2016 Democratic Party presidential primaries
- 2016 Republican Party presidential debates and forums
- 2016 Republican Party presidential primaries
