= 1996 United States presidential election in Ohio =

- November 5, 1996
- Turnout: 67.41% ▼

| Nominee | Bill Clinton | Bob Dole | Ross Perot |
| Party | Democratic | Republican | Reform |
| Home state | Arkansas | Kansas | Texas |
| Running mate | Al Gore | Jack Kemp | Pat Choate |
| Electoral vote | 21 | 0 | 0 |
| Popular vote | 2,148,222 | 1,859,883 | 483,207 |
| Percentage | 47.38% | 41.02% | 10.66% |
County results
Clinton
40–50%
50–60%
60–70%
Dole
40–50%
50–60%
President before election
Bill Clinton
Democratic
Elected President
Bill Clinton
Democratic

The 1996 United States presidential election in Ohio took place on November 5, 1996. All 50 states and the District of Columbia, were part of the 1996 United States presidential election. State voters chose 21 electors to the Electoral College, which selected the president and vice president.

Ohio was won by incumbent United States President Bill Clinton of Arkansas, who was running against Kansas Senator Bob Dole. Clinton ran a second time with former Tennessee Senator Al Gore as vice president, and Dole ran with former New York Congressman Jack Kemp.

Ohio weighed in for this election as 2% more third-party than the national average. The presidential election of 1996 was a very multi-partisan election for Ohio, with over 11% of the electorate voting for third-party candidates. Most counties in the state turned out more for Dole than Clinton. Two notable exceptions to this trend were Cleveland's Cuyahoga County, and residents of several counties on the eastern border with Pennsylvania and the southeastern border with West Virginia, who voted largely for Clinton. In his second bid for the presidency, Ross Perot led the newly reformed Reform Party to gain over 10% of the votes in Ohio, and to pull in support nationally as the most popular third-party candidate to run for United States Presidency in recent times.

As of the 2024 presidential election, this is the last election in which the following counties voted for a Democratic presidential candidate: Columbiana, Harrison, Hocking, Jackson, Lawrence, Meigs, Perry, Pike, Scioto, Vinton, Carroll, Gallia, Guernsey, Huron, Noble, Ross, and Seneca. This was the first time since 1940 that a Democrat carried Ohio in two consecutive presidential elections, and the last time a Democrat carried the state by more than 5%.

== Results ==
1996 United States presidential election in Ohio
| Party | Candidate | Votes | % | ±% | Electoral votes |
|---|---|---|---|---|---|
| Democratic | Bill Clinton (incumbent) | 2,148,222 | 47.38% | +7.20% | 21 |
| Republican | Bob Dole | 1,859,883 | 41.02% | +2.67% | 0 |
| Reform | Ross Perot | 483,207 | 10.66% | -10.32% | 0 |
| Not Designated | Harry Browne | 12,851 | 0.28% | N/A | 0 |
| Not Designated | Monica Moorehead | 10,813 | 0.24% | N/A | 0 |
| Natural Law | Dr. John Hagelin | 9,120 | 0.20% | N/A | 0 |
| Not Designated | Howard Phillips | 7,361 | 0.16% | N/A | 0 |
| Green | Ralph Nader (write-in) | 2,962 | 0.07% | N/A | 0 |
| Other write-ins | | 15 | 0.00% | N/A | 0 |
| Totals | | 4,534,434 | 100.00% | +4.53% | 21 |
| Voter Turnout (Voting age/Registered) | | | | | |

=== Results by county ===
| County | Bill Clinton Democratic | | Bob Dole Republican | | Ross Perot Reform | | Various candidates Other parties | | Margin | | Total votes cast |
| County | # | % | # | % | # | % | # | % | # | % | Total votes cast |
|---|---|---|---|---|---|---|---|---|---|---|---|
| Adams | 4,317 | 41.59% | 4,763 | 45.88% | 1,223 | 11.78% | 78 | 0.75% | -446 | -4.29% | 10,381 |
| Allen | 15,529 | 35.33% | 24,325 | 55.35% | 3,799 | 8.64% | 295 | 0.67% | -8,796 | -20.02% | 43,948 |
| Ashland | 6,573 | 33.24% | 10,402 | 52.61% | 2,630 | 13.30% | 168 | 0.85% | -3,829 | -19.37% | 19,773 |
| Ashtabula | 19,341 | 49.95% | 13,287 | 34.31% | 5,700 | 14.72% | 394 | 1.02% | 6,054 | 15.64% | 38,722 |
| Athens | 13,418 | 56.02% | 7,154 | 29.87% | 2,777 | 11.59% | 605 | 2.53% | 6,264 | 26.15% | 23,954 |
| Auglaize | 6,652 | 33.88% | 10,169 | 51.80% | 2,641 | 13.45% | 170 | 0.87% | -3,517 | -17.92% | 19,632 |
| Belmont | 17,705 | 57.79% | 8,213 | 26.81% | 4,452 | 14.53% | 269 | 0.88% | 9,492 | 30.98% | 30,639 |
| Brown | 6,318 | 41.12% | 6,970 | 45.36% | 1,941 | 12.63% | 137 | 0.89% | -652 | -4.24% | 15,366 |
| Butler | 43,690 | 35.70% | 67,023 | 54.76% | 10,540 | 8.61% | 1,145 | 0.94% | -23,333 | -19.06% | 122,398 |
| Carroll | 4,792 | 40.64% | 4,449 | 37.74% | 2,445 | 20.74% | 104 | 0.88% | 343 | 2.90% | 11,790 |
| Champaign | 5,990 | 40.22% | 6,568 | 44.10% | 2,219 | 14.90% | 116 | 0.78% | -578 | -3.88% | 14,893 |
| Clark | 27,890 | 48.25% | 22,297 | 38.57% | 7,083 | 12.25% | 532 | 0.92% | 5,593 | 9.68% | 57,802 |
| Clermont | 21,329 | 33.24% | 36,457 | 56.81% | 5,795 | 9.03% | 593 | 0.92% | -15,128 | -23.57% | 64,174 |
| Clinton | 5,303 | 36.52% | 7,504 | 51.68% | 1,588 | 10.94% | 126 | 0.87% | -2,201 | -15.16% | 14,521 |
| Columbiana | 20,716 | 47.48% | 15,386 | 35.27% | 7,127 | 16.34% | 400 | 0.92% | 5,330 | 12.21% | 43,629 |
| Coshocton | 6,005 | 41.91% | 6,018 | 42.00% | 2,183 | 15.23% | 124 | 0.87% | -13 | -0.09% | 14,330 |
| Crawford | 7,449 | 38.30% | 8,730 | 44.88% | 3,072 | 15.79% | 200 | 1.03% | -1,281 | -6.58% | 19,451 |
| Cuyahoga | 341,357 | 60.75% | 163,770 | 29.15% | 50,691 | 9.02% | 6,074 | 1.08% | 177,587 | 31.60% | 561,892 |
| Darke | 8,871 | 38.52% | 10,798 | 46.88% | 3,168 | 13.75% | 195 | 0.85% | -1,927 | -8.36% | 23,032 |
| Defiance | 6,343 | 39.91% | 7,469 | 47.00% | 1,929 | 12.14% | 152 | 0.96% | -1,126 | -7.09% | 15,893 |
| Delaware | 13,463 | 32.51% | 24,123 | 58.25% | 3,471 | 8.38% | 358 | 0.86% | -10,660 | -25.74% | 41,415 |
| Erie | 16,730 | 50.02% | 12,204 | 36.49% | 4,225 | 12.63% | 290 | 0.87% | 4,526 | 13.53% | 33,449 |
| Fairfield | 18,821 | 37.13% | 26,850 | 52.98% | 4,660 | 9.19% | 353 | 0.70% | -8,029 | -15.85% | 50,684 |
| Fayette | 3,665 | 38.15% | 4,831 | 50.29% | 1,047 | 10.90% | 64 | 0.67% | -1,166 | -12.14% | 9,607 |
| Franklin | 192,795 | 48.14% | 178,412 | 44.55% | 25,400 | 6.34% | 3,908 | 0.98% | 14,383 | 3.59% | 400,515 |
| Fulton | 6,662 | 37.20% | 8,703 | 48.60% | 2,412 | 13.47% | 130 | 0.73% | -2,041 | -11.40% | 17,907 |
| Gallia | 5,386 | 43.21% | 5,135 | 41.19% | 1,839 | 14.75% | 106 | 0.85% | 251 | 2.02% | 12,466 |
| Geauga | 14,143 | 36.18% | 19,662 | 50.30% | 4,848 | 12.40% | 436 | 1.12% | -5,519 | -14.12% | 39,089 |
| Greene | 25,082 | 40.60% | 30,677 | 49.65% | 5,246 | 8.49% | 777 | 1.26% | -5,595 | -9.05% | 61,782 |
| Guernsey | 6,731 | 44.55% | 5,970 | 39.52% | 2,251 | 14.90% | 156 | 1.03% | 761 | 5.03% | 15,108 |
| Hamilton | 160,458 | 43.13% | 186,493 | 50.12% | 21,335 | 5.73% | 3,782 | 1.02% | -26,035 | -6.99% | 372,068 |
| Hancock | 9,334 | 31.21% | 17,252 | 57.68% | 2,904 | 9.71% | 418 | 1.40% | -7,918 | -26.47% | 29,908 |
| Hardin | 4,930 | 41.51% | 5,506 | 46.36% | 1,365 | 11.49% | 75 | 0.63% | -576 | -4.85% | 11,876 |
| Harrison | 3,721 | 50.27% | 2,310 | 31.21% | 1,302 | 17.59% | 69 | 0.93% | 1,411 | 19.06% | 7,402 |
| Henry | 4,762 | 37.25% | 6,385 | 49.94% | 1,550 | 12.12% | 88 | 0.69% | -1,623 | -12.69% | 12,785 |
| Highland | 5,837 | 39.78% | 7,102 | 48.40% | 1,629 | 11.10% | 106 | 0.72% | -1,265 | -8.62% | 14,674 |
| Hocking | 4,646 | 44.86% | 4,017 | 38.79% | 1,564 | 15.10% | 129 | 1.25% | 629 | 6.07% | 10,356 |
| Holmes | 2,531 | 27.86% | 5,213 | 57.39% | 1,276 | 14.05% | 64 | 0.70% | -2,682 | -29.53% | 9,084 |
| Huron | 8,858 | 41.86% | 8,750 | 41.35% | 3,338 | 15.77% | 215 | 1.02% | 108 | 0.51% | 21,161 |
| Jackson | 5,538 | 45.79% | 4,922 | 40.69% | 1,529 | 12.64% | 106 | 0.88% | 616 | 5.10% | 12,095 |
| Jefferson | 19,402 | 56.04% | 10,212 | 29.49% | 4,748 | 13.71% | 261 | 0.75% | 9,190 | 26.55% | 34,623 |
| Knox | 7,562 | 37.68% | 10,159 | 50.62% | 2,138 | 10.65% | 209 | 1.04% | -2,597 | -12.94% | 20,068 |
| Lake | 43,186 | 44.19% | 40,974 | 41.92% | 12,507 | 12.80% | 1,069 | 1.09% | 2,212 | 2.27% | 97,736 |
| Lawrence | 11,595 | 48.46% | 8,832 | 36.91% | 3,232 | 13.51% | 267 | 1.12% | 2,763 | 11.55% | 23,926 |
| Licking | 22,624 | 39.03% | 28,276 | 48.78% | 6,516 | 11.24% | 551 | 0.95% | -5,652 | -9.75% | 57,967 |
| Logan | 6,397 | 37.31% | 8,325 | 48.56% | 2,264 | 13.21% | 159 | 0.93% | -1,928 | -11.25% | 17,145 |
| Lorain | 55,744 | 52.37% | 34,937 | 32.82% | 14,889 | 13.99% | 875 | 0.82% | 20,807 | 19.55% | 106,445 |
| Lucas | 104,911 | 57.72% | 58,120 | 31.98% | 17,282 | 9.51% | 1,434 | 0.79% | 46,791 | 25.74% | 181,747 |
| Madison | 5,072 | 37.79% | 6,871 | 51.20% | 1,386 | 10.33% | 92 | 0.69% | -1,799 | -13.41% | 13,421 |
| Mahoning | 72,716 | 61.53% | 31,397 | 26.57% | 13,213 | 11.18% | 852 | 0.72% | 41,319 | 34.96% | 118,178 |
| Marion | 10,482 | 42.48% | 11,112 | 45.04% | 2,897 | 11.74% | 183 | 0.74% | -630 | -2.56% | 24,674 |
| Medina | 23,727 | 40.16% | 26,120 | 44.21% | 8,700 | 14.72% | 539 | 0.91% | -2,393 | -4.05% | 59,086 |
| Meigs | 4,275 | 45.17% | 3,622 | 38.27% | 1,453 | 15.35% | 115 | 1.22% | 653 | 6.90% | 9,465 |
| Mercer | 6,300 | 35.69% | 8,832 | 50.03% | 2,361 | 13.37% | 160 | 0.91% | -2,532 | -14.34% | 17,653 |
| Miami | 15,540 | 38.85% | 19,509 | 48.77% | 4,599 | 11.50% | 357 | 0.89% | -3,969 | -9.92% | 40,005 |
| Monroe | 3,914 | 56.18% | 1,856 | 26.64% | 1,128 | 16.19% | 69 | 0.99% | 2,058 | 29.54% | 6,967 |
| Montgomery | 115,469 | 50.00% | 95,391 | 41.30% | 18,298 | 7.92% | 1,799 | 0.78% | 20,078 | 8.70% | 230,957 |
| Morgan | 2,385 | 39.94% | 2,566 | 42.97% | 922 | 15.44% | 98 | 1.64% | -181 | -3.03% | 5,971 |
| Morrow | 4,627 | 37.69% | 5,655 | 46.07% | 1,745 | 14.22% | 248 | 2.02% | -1,028 | -8.38% | 12,275 |
| Muskingum | 13,813 | 41.89% | 13,861 | 42.04% | 4,880 | 14.80% | 418 | 1.27% | -48 | -0.15% | 32,972 |
| Noble | 2,366 | 42.91% | 2,183 | 39.59% | 899 | 16.30% | 66 | 1.20% | 183 | 3.32% | 5,514 |
| Ottawa | 9,321 | 49.35% | 6,991 | 37.01% | 2,438 | 12.91% | 138 | 0.73% | 2,330 | 12.34% | 18,888 |
| Paulding | 3,449 | 40.12% | 3,760 | 43.74% | 1,292 | 15.03% | 95 | 1.11% | -311 | -3.62% | 8,596 |
| Perry | 5,819 | 46.75% | 4,606 | 37.00% | 1,854 | 14.90% | 168 | 1.35% | 1,213 | 9.75% | 12,447 |
| Pickaway | 7,042 | 40.24% | 8,666 | 49.52% | 1,702 | 9.73% | 91 | 0.52% | -1,624 | -9.28% | 17,501 |
| Pike | 5,542 | 51.38% | 3,759 | 34.85% | 1,402 | 13.00% | 84 | 0.78% | 1,783 | 16.53% | 10,787 |
| Portage | 29,441 | 50.55% | 18,939 | 32.52% | 9,178 | 15.76% | 680 | 1.17% | 10,502 | 18.03% | 58,238 |
| Preble | 6,611 | 38.59% | 8,139 | 47.50% | 2,235 | 13.05% | 148 | 0.86% | -1,528 | -8.91% | 17,133 |
| Putnam | 4,972 | 30.77% | 9,294 | 57.52% | 1,767 | 10.94% | 125 | 0.77% | -4,322 | -26.75% | 16,158 |
| Richland | 20,832 | 40.49% | 23,697 | 46.06% | 6,613 | 12.85% | 309 | 0.60% | -2,865 | -5.57% | 51,451 |
| Ross | 12,649 | 49.03% | 10,286 | 39.87% | 2,648 | 10.26% | 214 | 0.83% | 2,363 | 9.16% | 25,797 |
| Sandusky | 11,547 | 45.44% | 10,033 | 39.48% | 3,617 | 14.23% | 216 | 0.85% | 1,514 | 5.96% | 25,413 |
| Scioto | 15,041 | 48.01% | 11,679 | 37.28% | 4,418 | 14.10% | 190 | 0.61% | 3,362 | 10.73% | 31,328 |
| Seneca | 10,044 | 42.72% | 9,713 | 41.31% | 3,498 | 14.88% | 256 | 1.09% | 331 | 1.41% | 23,511 |
| Shelby | 6,729 | 36.65% | 8,773 | 47.78% | 2,686 | 14.63% | 174 | 0.95% | -2,044 | -11.13% | 18,362 |
| Stark | 73,437 | 46.38% | 60,212 | 38.03% | 23,004 | 14.53% | 1,693 | 1.07% | 13,225 | 8.35% | 158,346 |
| Summit | 112,050 | 52.07% | 73,555 | 34.18% | 27,723 | 12.88% | 1,867 | 0.87% | 38,495 | 17.89% | 215,195 |
| Trumbull | 55,604 | 58.69% | 24,811 | 26.19% | 13,563 | 14.32% | 767 | 0.81% | 30,793 | 32.50% | 94,745 |
| Tuscarawas | 15,244 | 43.86% | 13,388 | 38.52% | 5,682 | 16.35% | 441 | 1.27% | 1,856 | 5.34% | 34,755 |
| Union | 4,989 | 33.25% | 8,290 | 55.26% | 1,596 | 10.64% | 128 | 0.85% | -3,301 | -22.01% | 15,003 |
| Van Wert | 4,453 | 34.15% | 6,999 | 53.67% | 1,487 | 11.40% | 102 | 0.78% | -2,546 | -19.52% | 13,041 |
| Vinton | 2,350 | 48.85% | 1,673 | 34.77% | 728 | 15.13% | 60 | 1.25% | 677 | 14.08% | 4,811 |
| Warren | 17,089 | 30.84% | 33,210 | 59.94% | 4,689 | 8.46% | 421 | 0.76% | -16,121 | -29.10% | 55,409 |
| Washington | 10,945 | 42.13% | 11,965 | 46.06% | 2,832 | 10.90% | 235 | 0.90% | -1,020 | -3.93% | 25,977 |
| Wayne | 14,850 | 36.62% | 19,628 | 48.41% | 5,771 | 14.23% | 299 | 0.74% | -4,778 | -11.79% | 40,548 |
| Williams | 5,524 | 35.41% | 7,747 | 49.67% | 2,121 | 13.60% | 206 | 1.32% | -2,223 | -14.26% | 15,598 |
| Wood | 23,183 | 46.98% | 20,518 | 41.58% | 5,065 | 10.26% | 577 | 1.17% | 2,665 | 5.40% | 49,343 |
| Wyandot | 3,677 | 38.27% | 4,473 | 46.56% | 1,347 | 14.02% | 110 | 1.14% | -796 | -8.29% | 9,607 |
| Totals | 2,148,222 | 47.38% | 1,859,883 | 41.02% | 483,207 | 10.66% | 43,122 | 0.95% | 288,339 | 6.36% | 4,534,434 |

==== Counties that flipped from Democratic to Republican ====
- Coshocton

==== Counties that flipped from Republican to Democratic ====
- Franklin
- Gallia
- Huron
- Jackson
- Lake
- Noble
- Ross
- Sandusky
- Seneca

=== By congressional district ===
Clinton won 13 of 19 congressional districts, including five which elected Republicans, while the remaining six districts were won by Dole.

| District | Clinton | Dole | Perot | Representative |
|---|---|---|---|---|
| 1st | 50% | 44% | 6% | Steve Chabot |
| 2nd | 34% | 58% | 8% | Rob Portman |
| 3rd | 50% | 42% | 8% | Tony P. Hall |
| 4th | 38% | 50% | 12% | Mike Oxley |
| 5th | 42% | 45% | 13% | Paul Gilmor |
| 6th | 45% | 43% | 12% | Frank Cremeans |
| 6th | 45% | 43% | 12% | Ted Strickland |
| 7th | 41.7% | 47.8% | 10.5% | Dave Hobson |
| 8th | 37% | 52% | 11% | John Boehner |
| 9th | 56% | 34% | 10% | Marcy Kaptur |
| 10th | 52% | 36% | 12% | Martin Hoke |
| 10th | 52% | 36% | 12% | Dennis Kucinich |
| 11th | 80% | 15% | 5% | Louis Stokes |
| 12th | 47.5% | 45.9% | 6.6% | John Kasich |
| 13th | 47% | 39% | 14% | Sherrod Brown |
| 14th | 53.3% | 33.4% | 13.3% | Thomas C. Sawyer |
| 15th | 45% | 48% | 7% | Deborah Pryce |
| 16th | 43.2% | 42.5% | 14.3% | Ralph Regula |
| 17th | 59% | 28% | 13% | James Traficant |
| 18th | 48% | 37% | 15% | Bob Ney |
| 19th | 49% | 39% | 12% | Steve LaTourette |

== See also ==
- United States presidential elections in Ohio
- Presidency of Bill Clinton
