= National Register of Historic Places listings in Williams County, Ohio =

Location of Williams County in Ohio

This is a list of the National Register of Historic Places listings in Williams County, Ohio.

It is intended to be a complete list of the properties and districts on the National Register of Historic Places in Williams County, Ohio, United States. The locations of National Register properties and districts for which the latitude and longitude coordinates are included below, may be seen in a Google map.

There are 7 properties and districts listed on the National Register in the county.

This National Park Service list is complete through NPS recent listings posted March 14, 2025.

== Current listings ==
	Name on the Register	Image	Date listed	Location	City or town	Description
1	Bryan Downtown Historic District	Bryan Downtown Historic District	December 29, 1983 (#83004347)	Roughly bounded by Walnut, Beech, Maple, and Bryan Sts. 41°28′28″N 84°33′08″W	Bryan	
2	Fountain City Historic District	Fountain City Historic District	October 1, 1990 (#90001501)	Roughly bounded by Butler, Lynn, W. Wilson, Center, Portland, and Beech Sts. 41°28′16″N 84°33′12″W	Bryan	
3	James Delos Hill House	James Delos Hill House	May 30, 1997 (#97000509)	201 E. Main St. 41°35′12″N 84°36′20″W	Montpelier	
4	Kunkle Log House	Kunkle Log House	August 5, 1976 (#76001549)	1 mile east of the junction of County Roads O and 17, near Kunkle; 41°38′09″N 84°28′56″W	Madison Township	
5	Nettle Lake Mound Group	Nettle Lake Mound Group	March 27, 1974 (#74001650)	Eastern side of County Road 4-75, west of Nettle Lake; 41°41′15″N 84°43′53″W	Northwest Township	
6	Stryker Depot	Stryker Depot	August 7, 1989 (#89001014)	N. Depot St. 41°30′10″N 84°25′01″W	Stryker	
7	Williams County Courthouse	Williams County Courthouse	May 7, 1973 (#73001552)	Main and High Sts. 41°28′26″N 84°33′45″W	Bryan	

== See also ==
- List of National Historic Landmarks in Ohio
- Listings in neighboring counties: Defiance, DeKalb (IN), Fulton, Henry, Hillsdale County (MI), Steuben (IN)
- National Register of Historic Places listings in Ohio
