= West Jefferson =

West Jefferson is the name of several communities in the United States of America:

- West Jefferson, Alabama
- West Jefferson, North Carolina
- West Jefferson, Ohio, a village
- West Jefferson, Williams County, Ohio, an unincorporated community
