= Seneca Lake =

Seneca Lake or Lake Seneca may refer to:

- Seneca Lake (New York), the largest of the Finger Lakes in upstate New York
  - Seneca Lake AVA, New York wine region
- Lake Seneca, Ohio, an unincorporated community
- Seneca Lake (Ohio), another name for Senecaville Lake
