= Billingstown, Ohio =

Unincorporated community in Ohio, U.S.

Coordinates: 41°41′35″N 84°47′44″W

Billingstown is an unincorporated community in Williams County, in the U.S. state of Ohio.

== History ==
The community was named for William Billings, an early settler.
