= Hamer, Ohio =

Unincorporated community in Ohio, U.S.

Coordinates: 41°37′41″N 84°24′55″W

Hamer is an unincorporated community in Williams County, in the U.S. state of Ohio.

== History ==
The community likely bears the name of Thomas L. Hamer, a United States Democratic congressman and soldier in the Mexican–American War. With the construction of the railroad, business activity shifted to nearby Alvordton, and the town's population dwindled.
