= Florence Township, Williams County, Ohio =

Township in Ohio, US

- Township
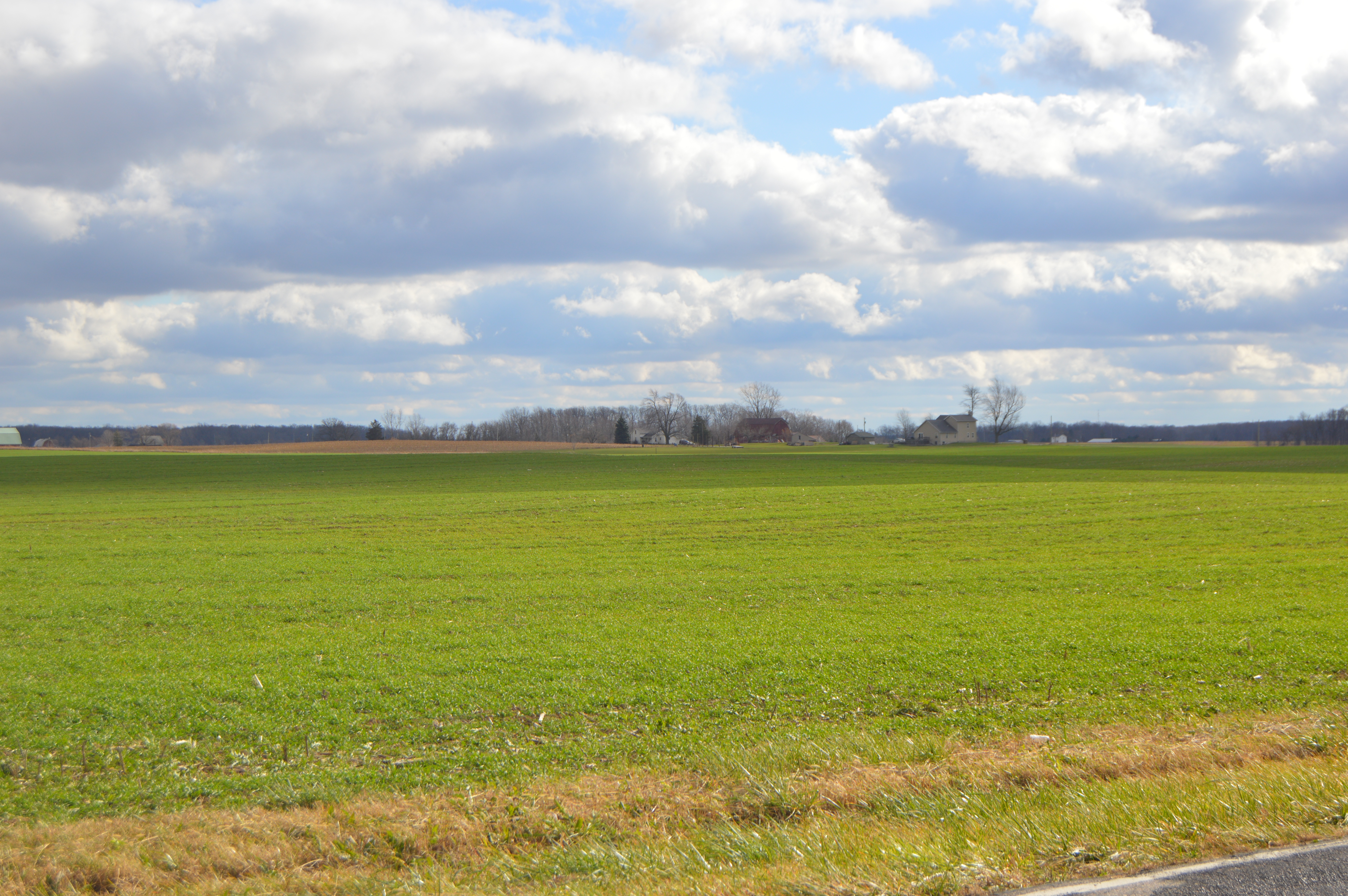
- Winter wheat field northeast of Edon

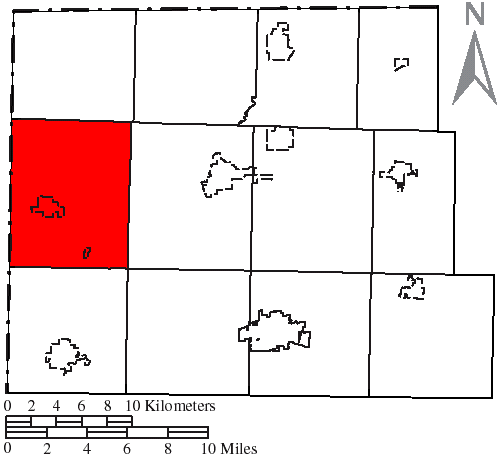
- Location of Florence Township in Williams County
- Coordinates: 41°33′24″N 84°45′4″W
- Country: United States
- State: Ohio
- County: Williams

Area
  - Total: 43.0 sq mi (111.4 km^{2})
  - Land: 43.0 sq mi (111.3 km^{2})
  - Water: 0 sq mi (0.0 km^{2})
- Elevation: 892 ft (272 m)

Population (2020)
  - Total: 1,973
  - Density: 45.91/sq mi (17.73/km^{2})
- Time zone: UTC-5 (Eastern (EST))
  - Summer (DST): UTC-4 (EDT)
- FIPS code: 39-27530
- GNIS feature ID: 1087169

Florence Township is one of the twelve townships of Williams County, Ohio, United States. The 2020 census found 1,973 people in the township.

== Geography ==
Located in the western part of the county along the Indiana line, it borders the following townships:

- Northwest Township - north
- Bridgewater Township - northeast corner
- Superior Township - east
- Center Township - southeast corner
- St. Joseph Township - south
- Troy Township, DeKalb County, Indiana - southwest
- Richland Township, Steuben County, Indiana - west

The villages of Blakeslee and Edon are located in Florence Township: Blakeslee in the southeast, and Edon in the west. The unincorporated community of Berlin is located in the township's northwest.

== Name and history ==
Florence Township was organized in 1837. Statewide, the only other Florence Township is located in Erie County.

== Government ==
The township is governed by a three-member board of trustees, who are elected in November of odd-numbered years to a four-year term beginning on the following January 1. Two are elected in the year after the presidential election and one is elected in the year before it. There is also an elected township fiscal officer, who serves a four-year term beginning on April 1 of the year after the election, which is held in November of the year before the presidential election. Vacancies in the fiscal officer ship or on the board of trustees are filled by the remaining trustees.
