= USS St. Joseph River =

1945 LSM(R)-501-class landing ship medium

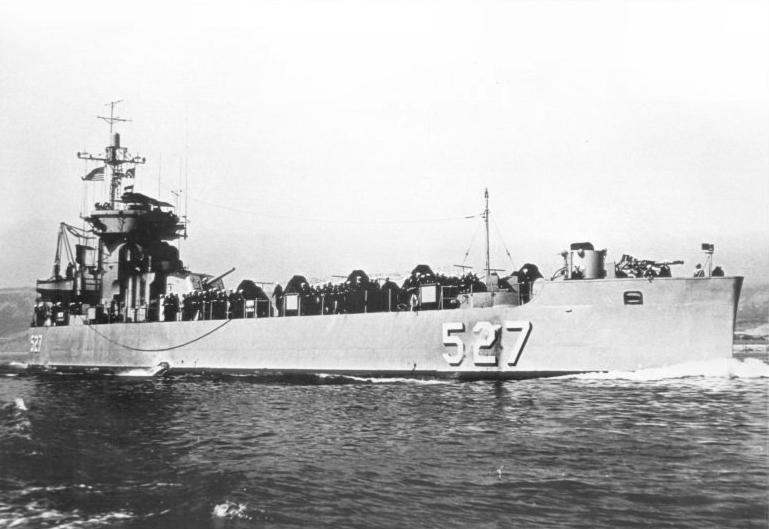
- USS St. Joseph River (LSM(R)-527) also served as the Si Hung (LF-311) with South Korea between 1960 and 1982

History

United States
- Name: USS St. Joseph River (LSM(R)-527)
- Namesake: St. Joseph River
- Builder: Brown Shipbuilding Company
- Laid down: 19 May 1945, as LSM(R)-527
- Launched: 16 June 1945
- Commissioned: 24 August 1945
- Decommissioned: 5 August 1955
- Renamed: St. Joseph River, 1 October 1955
- Honors and awards: 2 battle stars (South Korea)
- Fate: Sold to South Korea, 15 September 1960

South Korea
- Name: Si Hung (LFR-311)
- Acquired: 15 September 1960
- Decommissioned: 31 May 1982
- Fate: Scrapped, 1982

General characteristics
- Class & type: LSM(R)-501-class landing ship medium
- Displacement: 758 long tons (770 t) light; 993 long tons (1,009 t) attack; 1,175 long tons (1,194 t) full
- Length: 203 ft 3 in (61.95 m)
- Beam: 34 ft 6 in (10.52 m)
- Draft: 5 ft 4 in (1.63 m) light; 6 ft 9 in (2.06 m) attack; 7 ft 9 in (2.36 m) full
- Propulsion: 2 × General Motors, non-reversing with airflex clutch, Cleveland diesels, 1,440 bhp (1,074 kW) each at 720 rpm, 2 screws
- Speed: 13 knots (24 km/h; 15 mph)
- Range: 3,000 nmi (5,600 km) at 13 kn (24 km/h; 15 mph)
- Complement: 6 officers, 137 enlisted
- Armament: 1 × 5"/38 caliber gun; 2 × twin 40 mm AA guns; 4 × twin 20 mm AA guns; 4 × 4.2 in (110 mm) mortars; 20 × continuous loading 5 in (130 mm) Ship-to-Shore rocket launchers
- Armor: 10-lb. STS on conning station, pilot-house, radio room, radar plot, and rocket control; 10-lb. ASPP around 40 and 20 mm gun mounts and directors

USS St. Joseph River (LSM(R)-527) was laid down on 19 May 1945 by the Brown Shipbuilding Co., Inc., in Houston, Texas; she was launched on 16 June 1945 and commissioned on 24 August 1945.

== Service history ==
Active for less than three months, LSM(R)-527 joined the 16th (Inactive) Fleet in November 1945; decommissioned on 28 March 1946, she remained berthed for the next four years at Green Cove Springs, Florida. In June 1950, however, the North Korean Army pushed south across the 38th Parallel. LSM(R)-527 was recommissioned on 14 October.

=== Korean War ===
From mid-November 1950 until mid-March 1951, LSM(R)-527 trained out of Little Creek, Virginia, then headed for California and duty with the Pacific Fleet. Assigned to Landing Ship Squadron 3, she arrived in San Diego on 12 April. Through the summer, she conducted exercises off the southern California coast. In the fall, she underwent overhaul at Mare Island Navy Yard; and with the winter of 1951–52, she resumed operations off southern California. In March and April 1952, she operated off the Panama Canal Zone. In May, she headed west for duty off Korea.

LSM(R)-527 arrived at Yokosuka on 19 June. Ten days later, she was en route to operating area "Nan" off the west coast of the embattled Korean Peninsula. From 3 to 15 July and again from 16 August to 3 September, she helped to defend the islands held by United Nations forces, particularly Cho-Do and Sok-To in the approaches to the Taedong estuary.

Returning to Japan after each tour, she sailed for the Korean east coast from Sasebo Naval base on 10 October. In TU 76.42.1, she conducted exercises off Kangmung. On 15 October, she arrived off Kojo to provide shore bombardment support for the amphibious feint staged there on that date. By 18 October, she was back in Sasebo. Exercises in Japanese waters followed, and on 14 November, she returned to area "Nan." Through December, she continued to operate off Cho-Do and Sok-To. After fire support activities in early January 1953, she shifted to Taechong-Do. She returned to Yokosuka on 25 January; she sailed for California on 24 February.

Steaming via Midway Atoll and Pearl Harbor, LSM(R)-527 arrived in San Diego on 23 March and remained on the west coast until 10 February 1954. She then headed west again. In the western Pacific from mid-March to mid-October, she participated in exercises in Japanese, Korean, and Okinawan waters and in the Volcano Islands area and carried cargo between Japanese and Korean ports.

On 7 November, LSM(R)-527 returned to San Diego. Two months later, in January 1955, she entered the Mare Island Naval Shipyard to prepare for inactivation. In April, she joined the Pacific Reserve Fleet. On 5 August, she was decommissioned and berthed with the San Diego Group. She was renamed St. Joseph River on 1 October (for the St. Josephs River in northeast Indiana).

LSM(R)-527 earned two battle stars during the Korean War.

== ROKS Si Hung ==
The USS St. Joseph River remained berthed at San Diego until activated in the summer of 1960, when she was transferred to the Republic of Korea Navy and commissioned as ROKS Si Hung (LFR-311).
