= Columbia, Williams County, Ohio =

Unincorporated community in Ohio, U.S.

Coordinates: 41°37′59″N 84°47′19″W

Columbia is an unincorporated community in Williams County, in the U.S. state of Ohio.

== History ==
Columbia was founded in 1854.

The village was the terminus of the St Joseph Valley Railway from 1915 to 1918, running from Angola, Indiana. This was a failed interurban electric railroad project attempting to create a passenger service between Chicago and Toledo, but which was never electrified.
