= Pulaski, Ohio =

- CDP
- Interactive map of Pulaski, Ohio
- Coordinates: 41°30′39″N 84°30′28″W
- Country: United States
- State: Ohio
- County: Williams
- Elevation: 758 ft (231 m)

Population (2020)
  - Total: 121
- Time zone: UTC-5 (Eastern (EST))
  - Summer (DST): UTC-4 (EDT)
- Area code: 419
- GNIS feature ID: 2628955

Pulaski is a census-designated place in Williams County, in the U.S. state of Ohio. The population was 121 at the 2020 census.

== History ==
Pulaski was originally called Lafayette. When it was discovered another Lafayette existed in the state, the name was changed to Pulaski in order to avoid repetition. A post office called Pulaski was established in 1837, and remained in operation until 1914. The present name honors Count Casimir Pulaski, an American Revolutionary War soldier.
