= Cooney, Ohio =

Unincorporated community in Ohio, U.S.

Coordinates: 41°39′26″N 84°44′51″W

Cooney is an unincorporated community in Williams County, in the U.S. state of Ohio.

== History ==
A post office was established at Cooney in 1881, and remained in operation until 1904. A family of settlers probably gave this community their name.
