= Berlin, Williams County, Ohio =

Unincorporated community in Ohio, U.S.

Coordinates: 41°36′34″N 84°45′16″W

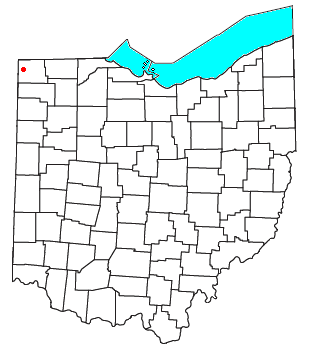
Location of Berlin in Williams County, Ohio

Berlin (/ˈbɜːrlɪn/ BUR-lin) is an unincorporated community in northern Florence Township, Williams County, Ohio, United States. It is located in the northwest corner of Ohio, approximately two miles from Indiana and six miles from Michigan. It lies along State Route 49, a short distance south of the Ohio Turnpike.

It is located at latitude 41° 36' 34" north and longitude 84° 45' 16" west. The elevation is 942 feet above sea level.

== See also ==
- Berlin, Holmes County, Ohio
