= Mina, Ohio =

Unincorporated community in Ohio, U.S.

Coordinates: 41°27′14″N 84°42′40″W

Mina is an unincorporated community in Williams County, in the U.S. state of Ohio. Mina had its start as a water stop on the railroad.
