= Superior Township, Williams County, Ohio =

Township in Ohio, US

- Township
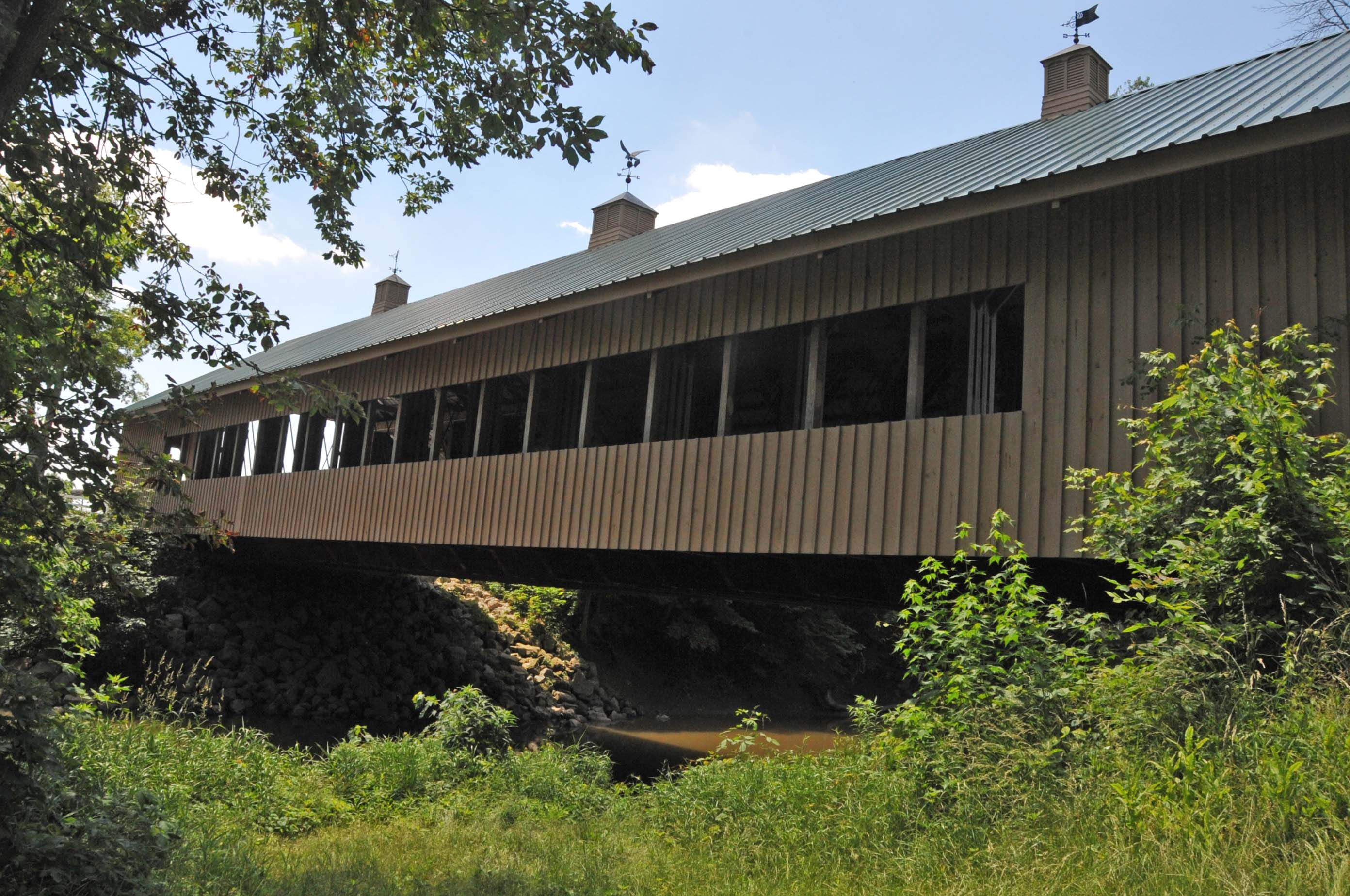
- St. Joseph River covered bridge, shared with Montpelier

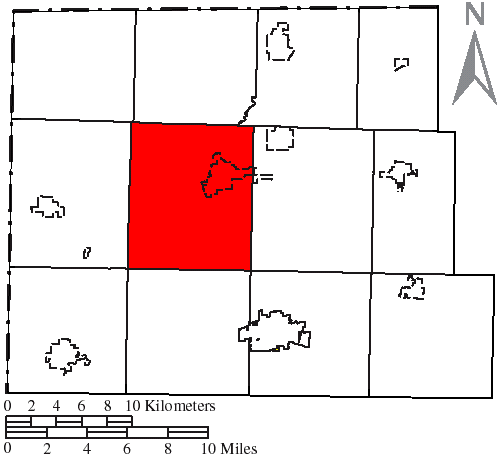
- Location of Superior Township in Williams County
- Coordinates: 41°34′40″N 84°37′12″W
- Country: United States
- State: Ohio
- County: Williams

Area
  - Total: 43.8 sq mi (113.4 km^{2})
  - Land: 43.6 sq mi (112.8 km^{2})
  - Water: 0.23 sq mi (0.6 km^{2})
- Elevation: 863 ft (263 m)

Population (2020)
  - Total: 1,286
  - Density: 30/sq mi (11.4/km^{2})
- Time zone: UTC-5 (Eastern (EST))
  - Summer (DST): UTC-4 (EDT)
- FIPS code: 39-75819
- GNIS feature ID: 1087177

Superior Township is one of the twelve townships of Williams County, Ohio, United States. The 2020 census found 1,286 people in the township.

== Geography ==
Located in the central part of the county, it borders the following townships:

- Bridgewater Township - north
- Madison Township - northeast
- Jefferson Township - east
- Pulaski Township - southeast corner
- Center Township - south
- St. Joseph Township - southwest corner
- Florence Township - west
- Northwest Township - northwest corner

It is one of only two county townships (the other being Jefferson Township) without a border on another county.

Most of the village of Montpelier is located in northeastern Superior Township.

== Name and history ==
Superior Township was organized in 1839. It is the only Superior Township statewide.

== Government ==
The township is governed by a three-member board of trustees, who are elected in November of odd-numbered years to a four-year term beginning on the following January 1. Two are elected in the year after the presidential election and one is elected in the year before it. There is also an elected township fiscal officer, who serves a four-year term beginning on April 1 of the year after the election, which is held in November of the year before the presidential election. Vacancies in the fiscal officership or on the board of trustees are filled by the remaining trustees.
