= Blakeslee, Ohio =

- Village
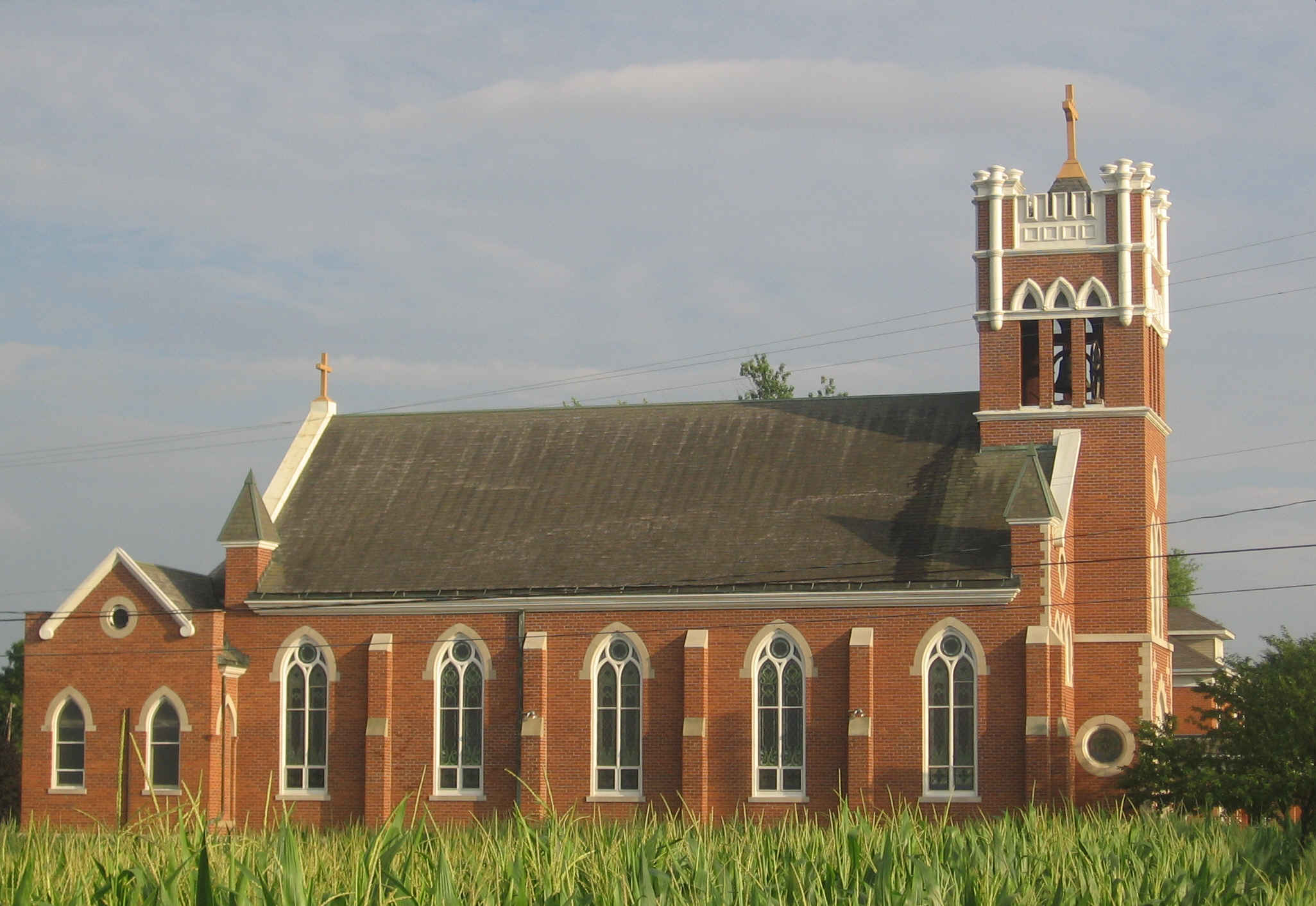
- St Joseph Catholic Church in northern Blakeslee

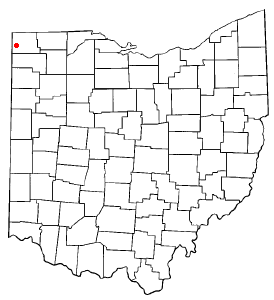
- Location of Blakeslee, Ohio

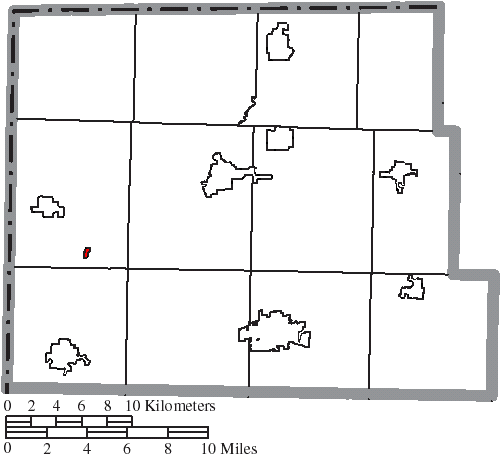
- Location of Blakeslee in Williams County
- Coordinates: 41°31′27″N 84°43′51″W
- Country: United States
- State: Ohio
- County: Williams
- Township: Florence
- Founded: 1880
- Incorporated: November 7, 1894
- Founder: John Boman
- Named for: Schuyler E. Blakeslee

Government
  - Type: Village council
  - Mayor: Eric Jenkins

Area
  - Total: 0.093 sq mi (0.24 km^{2})
  - Land: 0.093 sq mi (0.24 km^{2})
  - Water: 0 sq mi (0.00 km^{2})
- Elevation: 863 ft (263 m)

Population (2020)
  - Total: 104
  - Estimate (2023): 103
  - Density: 1,103.1/sq mi (425.89/km^{2})
- Time zone: UTC-5 (Eastern (EST))
  - Summer (DST): UTC-4 (EDT)
- ZIP code: 43505
- Area code(s): 419, 567
- FIPS code: 39-06810
- GNIS feature ID: 2398130

Blakeslee is a village in Florence Township, Williams County, Ohio, United States. The population was 104 at the 2020 census.

== History ==
Blakeslee was platted in 1880 by John Boman and incorporated as a village in 1894. The village was named for Schuyler E. Blakeslee, a local attorney. A post office has been in operation at Blakeslee since 1880.

== Geography ==
According to the United States Census Bureau, the village has a total area of 0.11 square miles (0.28 km^{2}), all land.

== Demographics ==
Historical population
Census	Pop.	Note	%±
1900	239		—
1910	169		−29.3%
1920	121		−28.4%
1930	146		20.7%
1940	164		12.3%
1950	142		−13.4%
1960	156		9.9%
1970	163		4.5%
1980	136		−16.6%
1990	128		−5.9%
2000	130		1.6%
2010	96		−26.2%
2020	104		8.3%
2023 (est.)	103	▼	−1.0%
U.S. Decennial Census

=== 2010 census ===
As of the census of 2010, there were 96 people, 45 households, and 26 families living in the village. The population density was 872.7 inhabitants per square mile (337.0/km^{2}). There were 50 housing units at an average density of 454.5 per square mile (175.5/km^{2}). The racial makeup of the village was 100.0% White.

There were 45 households, of which 28.9% had children under the age of 18 living with them, 48.9% were married couples living together, 8.9% had a female householder with no husband present, and 42.2% were non-families. 37.8% of all households were made up of individuals, and 17.8% had someone living alone who was 65 years of age or older. The average household size was 2.13 and the average family size was 2.85.

The median age in the village was 38 years. 22.9% of residents were under the age of 18; 7.3% were between the ages of 18 and 24; 28.1% were from 25 to 44; 18.8% were from 45 to 64; and 22.9% were 65 years of age or older. The gender makeup of the village was 49.0% male and 51.0% female.

=== 2000 census ===
As of the census of 2000, there were 130 people, 48 households, and 34 families living in the village. The population density was 1,226.8 inhabitants per square mile (473.7/km^{2}). There were 49 housing units at an average density of 462.4 per square mile (178.5/km^{2}). The racial makeup of the village was 99.23% White and 0.77% Native American. Hispanic or Latino of any race were 0.77% of the population.

There were 48 households, out of which 37.5% had children under the age of 18 living with them, 58.3% were married couples living together, 10.4% had a female householder with no husband present, and 27.1% were non-families. 22.9% of all households were made up of individuals, and 8.3% had someone living alone who was 65 years of age or older. The average household size was 2.71 and the average family size was 3.17.

In the village, the population was spread out, with 33.1% under the age of 18, 9.2% from 18 to 24, 29.2% from 25 to 44, 16.2% from 45 to 64, and 12.3% who were 65 years of age or older. The median age was 29 years. For every 100 females there were 103.1 males. For every 100 females age 18 and over, there were 85.1 males.

The median income for a household in the village was $43,750, and the median income for a family was $45,250. Males had a median income of $32,250 versus $20,000 for females. The per capita income for the village was $16,738. There were no families and 1.7% of the population living below the poverty line, including no under eighteens and 9.1% of those over 64.
