= Bridgewater Township, Ohio =

Township in Ohio, US

Bridgewater Township, Williams County, Ohio
- Township
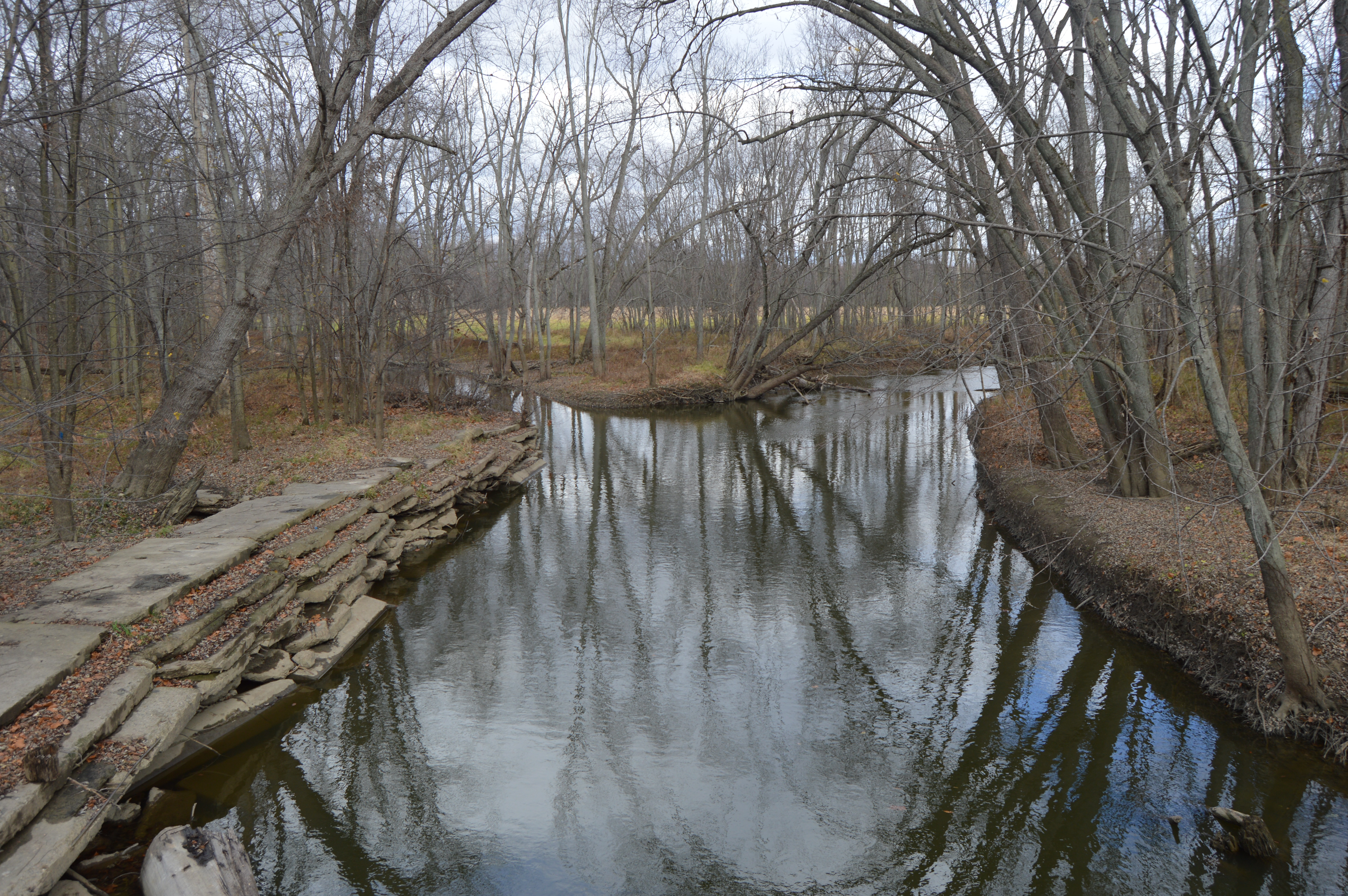
- The St. Joseph River just north of the Ohio Turnpike

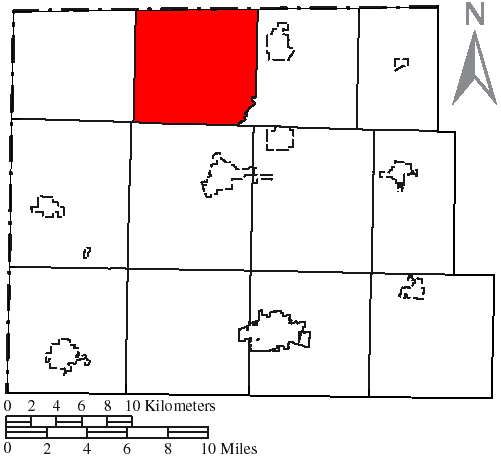
- Location of Bridgewater Township in Williams County
- Coordinates: 41°39′52″N 84°37′55″W
- Country: United States
- State: Ohio
- County: Williams

Area
  - Total: 33.9 sq mi (87.8 km^{2})
  - Land: 33.5 sq mi (86.7 km^{2})
  - Water: 0.42 sq mi (1.1 km^{2})
- Elevation: 909 ft (277 m)

Population (2020)
  - Total: 1,434
  - Density: 43/sq mi (16.5/km^{2})
- Time zone: UTC-5 (Eastern (EST))
  - Summer (DST): UTC-4 (EDT)
- FIPS code: 39-08630
- GNIS feature ID: 1087166

Bridgewater Township is one of the twelve townships of Williams County, Ohio, United States. The 2020 census found 1,434 people in the township.

== Geography ==
Located in the northern part of the county along the Michigan state line, it borders the following townships:

- Amboy Township, Hillsdale County, Michigan - north
- Madison Township - east
- Superior Township - south
- Florence Township - southwest corner
- Northwest Township - west

No municipalities are located in Bridgewater Township. The township lies within the Toledo Strip, a contested ribbon of land over which Ohio and Michigan came to blows in an 1835–36 confrontation known as the Toledo War.

== Name and history ==
Bridgewater Township was established around 1839, and first elections were held in 1840. It is the only Bridgewater Township statewide.

== Government ==
The township is governed by a three-member board of trustees, who are elected in November of odd-numbered years to a four-year term beginning on the following January 1. Two are elected in the year after the presidential election and one is elected in the year before it. There is also an elected township fiscal officer, who serves a four-year term beginning on April 1 of the year after the election, which is held in November of the year before the presidential election. Vacancies in the fiscal officership or on the board of trustees are filled by the remaining trustees.
