= Kunkle Log House =

- U.S. National Register of Historic Places
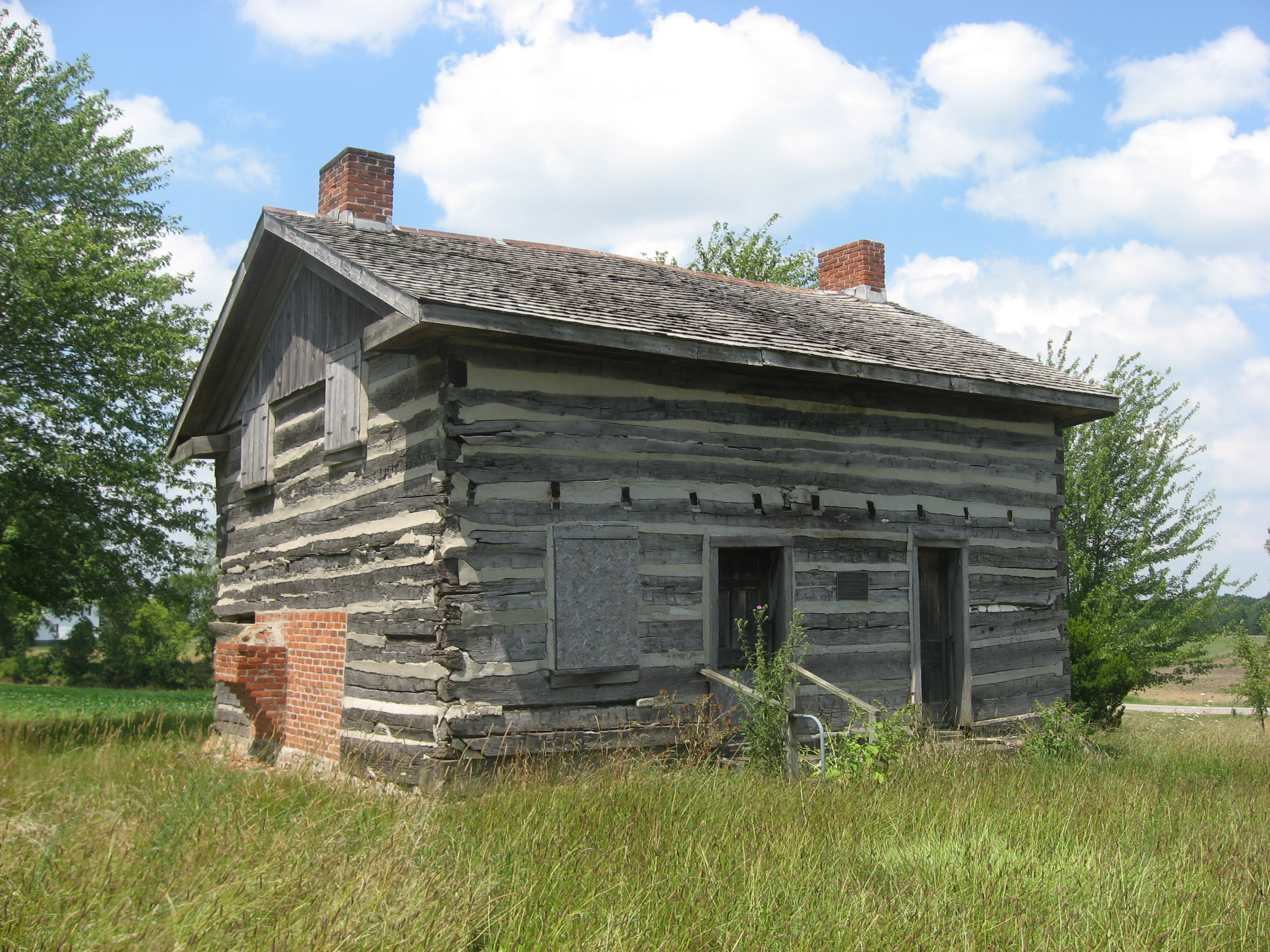

- Location within Ohio
- Location: 1 mile (1.6 km) east of the junction of County Roads O and 17, Kunkle, Ohio
- Coordinates: 41°38′09″N 84°28′56″W
- Area: less than one acre
- Built: 1838
- Built by: Jacob Young
- NRHP reference No.: 76001549
- Added to NRHP: August 5, 1976

The Kunkle Log House, also known as the Jacob Young Log House, is a historic log cabin located on County Road O east of Kunkle, Ohio. Jacob Young, who moved to Ohio from Vermont with his family, built the house in 1838. It was the first log cabin in Williams County, as the area was thinly settled at the time and most houses were built from sawn wood instead of logs. The one-and-a-half story house has a stone foundation, an external oven, and a full basement; the latter two features are uncommon in log cabins. The interior contains a full kitchen and living room, three bedrooms, a borning room, and a parson's cupboard used to hold the family Bible.

The house was added to the National Register of Historic Places on August 5, 1976. It is currently owned by the Williams County Historical Society, which is restoring the property.
