= Lock Port, Ohio =

Unincorporated community in Ohio, U.S.

Coordinates: 41°32′59″N 84°23′24″W

Lock Port is an unincorporated community in Williams County, in the U.S. state of Ohio.

== History ==
A sawmill was built at Lockport in 1834. A post office called Lockport was established in 1837, and remained in operation until 1876.
