= 1992 United States presidential election in Ohio =

- November 3, 1992
- Turnout: 77.14% ▲

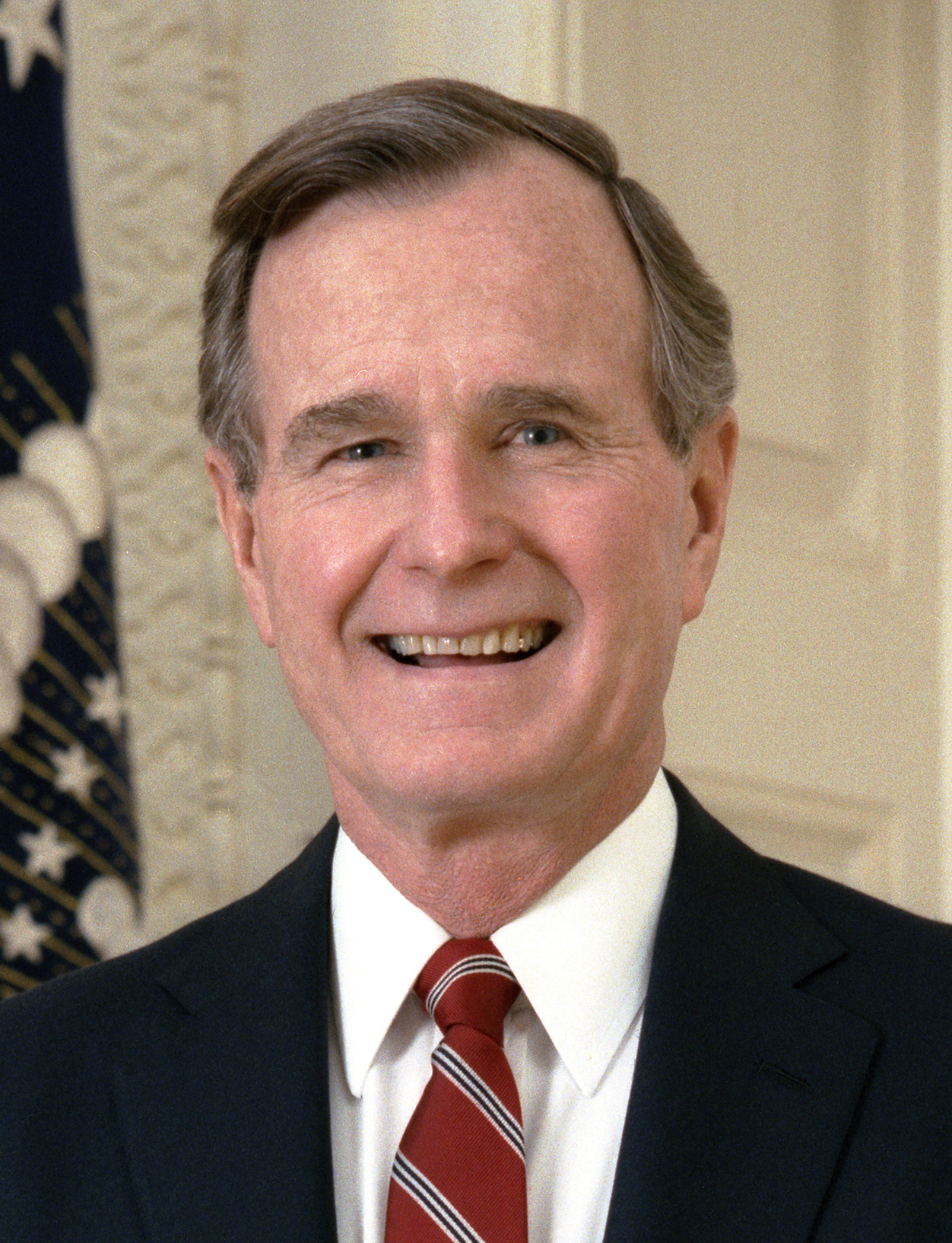

| Nominee | Bill Clinton | George H. W. Bush | Ross Perot |
| Party | Democratic | Republican | Independent |
| Home state | Arkansas | Texas | Texas |
| Running mate | Al Gore | Dan Quayle | James Stockdale |
| Electoral vote | 21 | 0 | 0 |
| Popular vote | 1,984,942 | 1,894,310 | 1,036,426 |
| Percentage | 40.18% | 38.35% | 20.98% |
Clinton
30–40%
40–50%
50–60%
Bush
30–40%
40–50%
50–60%
President before election
George H. W. Bush
Republican
Elected President
Bill Clinton
Democratic

The 1992 United States presidential election in Ohio took place on November 3, 1992, as part of the 1992 United States presidential election. Voters chose 21 representatives, or electors to the Electoral College, who voted for president and vice president.

Ohio was won by Governor Bill Clinton (D-Arkansas) with 40.18% of the popular vote over incumbent President George H. W. Bush (R-Texas) with 38.35%. Businessman Ross Perot (I-Texas) finished in third, with 20.98% of the popular vote. Governor Clinton thus defeated President Bush for Ohio's 21 Electoral Votes, by a statewide vote margin of 1.83% Clinton ultimately won both the electoral and national vote, defeating incumbent President Bush. With Ohio called for Clinton, a number of networks simultaneously declared him president-elect. As of the 2024 presidential election, this is the last election in which Coshocton County voted for a Democratic presidential candidate, the last in which Franklin County voted for a Republican presidential candidate and the last until 2020 in which Sandusky County voted for a losing candidate.

States just as close as Ohio that were called for Clinton as soon as their polls closed, such as Georgia, New Jersey, and Colorado, was why Ohio was the state that put Clinton over the top according to news networks, albeit Tennessee was the tipping point state. This was also the only time since 1944 that Ohio did not vote the same way as Florida, a bellwether state just like Ohio.

Clinton's strongest performance was in the east of the state near the border with Pennsylvania. He also gained solid majorities in the industrial regions focused on Youngstown, Akron, and Cleveland. Bush performed best in the rural western agricultural counties as did Perot. Perot received the second-highest share of the vote in three of these counties (Mercer, Shelby, and Williams) and he beat Bush in one county won by Clinton (Trumbull).

== Results ==
1992 United States presidential election in Ohio
| Party | Candidate | Votes | Percentage | Electoral votes |
|---|---|---|---|---|
| Democratic | Bill Clinton | 1,984,942 | 40.18% | 21 |
| Republican | George H. W. Bush (incumbent) | 1,894,310 | 38.35% | 0 |
| Not designated | Ross Perot | 1,036,426 | 20.98% | 0 |
| Not designated | Andre Marrou | 7,252 | 0.15% | 0 |
| Not designated | Lenora Fulani | 6,411 | 0.13% | 0 |
| Not designated | James Bo Gritz | 4,698 | 0.10% | 0 |
| Not designated | John Hagelin | 3,437 | 0.07% | 0 |
| Not designated | Lyndon LaRouche | 2,446 | 0.05% | 0 |
| Write-in | James Warren | 32 | 0.00% | 0 |
| N/A | Write-ins | 10 | 0.00% | 0 |
| Totals | | 4,939,964 | 100.0% | 21 |

=== Results by county ===
| County | Bill Clinton Democratic | | George H.W. Bush Republican | | Ross Perot Independent | | Various candidates Other parties | | Margin | | Total votes cast |
| County | # | % | # | % | # | % | # | % | # | % | Total votes cast |
|---|---|---|---|---|---|---|---|---|---|---|---|
| Adams | 3,998 | 37.16% | 4,722 | 43.89% | 1,993 | 18.53% | 45 | 0.42% | -724 | -6.73% | 10,758 |
| Allen | 13,777 | 29.10% | 25,322 | 53.48% | 8,131 | 17.17% | 120 | 0.25% | -11,545 | -24.38% | 47,350 |
| Ashland | 5,985 | 28.70% | 9,864 | 47.30% | 4,950 | 23.74% | 56 | 0.27% | -3,879 | -18.60% | 20,855 |
| Ashtabula | 18,843 | 43.79% | 13,254 | 30.80% | 10,765 | 25.02% | 166 | 0.39% | 5,589 | 12.99% | 43,028 |
| Athens | 13,423 | 52.04% | 7,184 | 27.85% | 5,074 | 19.67% | 112 | 0.43% | 6,239 | 24.19% | 25,793 |
| Auglaize | 4,960 | 24.43% | 10,455 | 51.49% | 4,840 | 23.84% | 51 | 0.25% | -5,495 | -27.06% | 20,306 |
| Belmont | 18,527 | 55.44% | 8,614 | 25.77% | 6,142 | 18.38% | 138 | 0.41% | 9,913 | 29.67% | 33,421 |
| Brown | 5,540 | 36.48% | 5,912 | 38.93% | 3,676 | 24.21% | 58 | 0.38% | -372 | -2.45% | 15,186 |
| Butler | 39,682 | 30.27% | 63,375 | 48.34% | 27,527 | 21.00% | 528 | 0.40% | -23,693 | -18.07% | 131,112 |
| Carroll | 4,731 | 37.96% | 4,224 | 33.89% | 3,434 | 27.55% | 74 | 0.59% | 507 | 4.07% | 12,463 |
| Champaign | 5,201 | 32.00% | 7,004 | 43.10% | 3,992 | 24.56% | 55 | 0.34% | -1,803 | -11.10% | 16,252 |
| Clark | 26,692 | 42.01% | 24,011 | 37.79% | 12,571 | 19.79% | 264 | 0.42% | 2,681 | 4.22% | 63,538 |
| Clermont | 17,558 | 27.37% | 32,065 | 49.99% | 14,279 | 22.26% | 240 | 0.37% | -14,507 | -22.62% | 64,142 |
| Clinton | 4,638 | 30.13% | 7,290 | 47.37% | 3,402 | 22.10% | 61 | 0.40% | -2,652 | -17.24% | 15,391 |
| Columbiana | 19,765 | 41.56% | 15,016 | 31.58% | 12,611 | 26.52% | 162 | 0.34% | 4,749 | 9.98% | 47,554 |
| Coshocton | 6,212 | 38.41% | 5,705 | 35.27% | 4,081 | 25.23% | 175 | 1.08% | 507 | 3.14% | 16,173 |
| Crawford | 6,351 | 30.48% | 8,618 | 41.36% | 5,764 | 27.66% | 102 | 0.49% | -2,267 | -10.88% | 20,835 |
| Cuyahoga | 337,548 | 52.72% | 187,186 | 29.24% | 112,352 | 17.55% | 3,155 | 0.49% | 150,362 | 23.48% | 640,241 |
| Darke | 7,016 | 28.72% | 11,098 | 45.44% | 6,217 | 25.45% | 95 | 0.39% | -4,082 | -16.72% | 24,426 |
| Defiance | 5,735 | 33.32% | 7,195 | 41.80% | 4,187 | 24.33% | 94 | 0.55% | -1,460 | -8.48% | 17,211 |
| Delaware | 9,263 | 25.12% | 18,225 | 49.43% | 9,244 | 25.07% | 141 | 0.38% | -8,962 | -24.31% | 36,873 |
| Erie | 14,531 | 40.56% | 12,459 | 34.77% | 8,720 | 24.34% | 118 | 0.33% | 2,072 | 5.79% | 35,828 |
| Fairfield | 14,249 | 28.06% | 24,125 | 47.50% | 12,246 | 24.11% | 169 | 0.33% | -9,876 | -19.44% | 50,789 |
| Fayette | 2,976 | 29.51% | 4,916 | 48.74% | 2,162 | 21.44% | 32 | 0.32% | -1,940 | -19.23% | 10,086 |
| Franklin | 176,656 | 39.72% | 186,324 | 41.89% | 79,049 | 17.77% | 2,772 | 0.62% | -9,668 | -2.17% | 444,801 |
| Fulton | 5,576 | 29.65% | 8,358 | 44.45% | 4,798 | 25.52% | 72 | 0.38% | -2,782 | -14.80% | 18,804 |
| Gallia | 5,350 | 38.94% | 5,776 | 42.04% | 2,549 | 18.55% | 63 | 0.46% | -426 | -3.10% | 13,738 |
| Geauga | 11,466 | 28.30% | 18,200 | 44.92% | 10,577 | 26.10% | 275 | 0.68% | -6,734 | -16.62% | 40,518 |
| Greene | 20,139 | 33.85% | 27,651 | 46.47% | 11,459 | 19.26% | 253 | 0.43% | -7,512 | -12.62% | 59,502 |
| Guernsey | 6,428 | 39.32% | 5,749 | 35.17% | 4,103 | 25.10% | 68 | 0.42% | 679 | 4.15% | 16,348 |
| Hamilton | 148,409 | 36.79% | 192,447 | 47.70% | 60,145 | 14.91% | 2,419 | 0.60% | -44,038 | -10.91% | 403,420 |
| Hancock | 7,944 | 24.85% | 16,821 | 52.63% | 7,002 | 21.91% | 196 | 0.61% | -8,877 | -27.78% | 31,963 |
| Hardin | 4,364 | 33.02% | 5,851 | 44.28% | 2,867 | 21.70% | 133 | 1.01% | -1,487 | -11.26% | 13,215 |
| Harrison | 3,830 | 48.93% | 2,289 | 29.24% | 1,679 | 21.45% | 29 | 0.37% | 1,541 | 19.69% | 7,827 |
| Henry | 3,933 | 29.44% | 6,196 | 46.38% | 3,178 | 23.79% | 52 | 0.39% | -2,263 | -16.94% | 13,359 |
| Highland | 4,866 | 31.92% | 7,020 | 46.06% | 3,315 | 21.75% | 41 | 0.27% | -2,154 | -14.14% | 15,242 |
| Hocking | 3,935 | 37.21% | 3,761 | 35.57% | 2,831 | 26.77% | 47 | 0.44% | 174 | 1.64% | 10,574 |
| Holmes | 1,969 | 21.74% | 5,079 | 56.08% | 1,945 | 21.48% | 63 | 0.70% | -3,110 | -34.34% | 9,056 |
| Huron | 7,930 | 32.41% | 9,480 | 38.74% | 6,751 | 27.59% | 310 | 1.27% | -1,550 | -6.33% | 24,471 |
| Jackson | 5,016 | 38.94% | 5,422 | 42.09% | 2,389 | 18.54% | 56 | 0.43% | -406 | -3.15% | 12,883 |
| Jefferson | 20,978 | 54.07% | 10,764 | 27.74% | 6,910 | 17.81% | 146 | 0.38% | 10,214 | 26.33% | 38,798 |
| Knox | 7,259 | 33.38% | 9,044 | 41.59% | 5,282 | 24.29% | 160 | 0.74% | -1,785 | -8.21% | 21,745 |
| Lake | 37,682 | 35.55% | 40,766 | 38.46% | 26,878 | 25.36% | 664 | 0.63% | -3,084 | -2.91% | 105,990 |
| Lawrence | 12,325 | 45.61% | 10,044 | 37.17% | 4,536 | 16.79% | 116 | 0.43% | 2,281 | 8.44% | 27,021 |
| Licking | 18,898 | 31.27% | 26,918 | 44.54% | 13,806 | 22.84% | 812 | 1.34% | -8,020 | -13.27% | 60,434 |
| Logan | 4,889 | 26.02% | 9,364 | 49.84% | 4,472 | 23.80% | 62 | 0.33% | -4,475 | -23.82% | 18,787 |
| Lorain | 50,962 | 42.97% | 36,803 | 31.03% | 30,425 | 25.65% | 415 | 0.35% | 14,159 | 11.94% | 118,605 |
| Lucas | 99,989 | 49.25% | 63,297 | 31.18% | 38,108 | 18.77% | 1,625 | 0.80% | 36,692 | 18.07% | 203,019 |
| Madison | 3,998 | 28.41% | 6,865 | 48.79% | 3,170 | 22.53% | 38 | 0.27% | -2,867 | -20.38% | 14,071 |
| Mahoning | 64,731 | 51.52% | 31,191 | 24.82% | 29,417 | 23.41% | 311 | 0.25% | 33,540 | 26.70% | 125,650 |
| Marion | 9,444 | 34.08% | 11,675 | 42.13% | 6,471 | 23.35% | 125 | 0.45% | -2,231 | -8.05% | 27,715 |
| Medina | 18,995 | 31.34% | 24,090 | 39.75% | 17,290 | 28.53% | 226 | 0.37% | -5,095 | -8.41% | 60,601 |
| Meigs | 4,226 | 41.08% | 3,916 | 38.07% | 2,098 | 20.40% | 46 | 0.45% | 310 | 3.01% | 10,286 |
| Mercer | 4,883 | 26.33% | 8,683 | 46.82% | 4,913 | 26.49% | 66 | 0.36% | 3,770 (Note: In this county where Perot ran ahead of Clinton, margin given is Bush vote minus Perot vote and percentage margin is Bush percentage minus Perot percentage.) | -20.33% | -18,545 |
| Miami | 12,547 | 29.17% | 19,741 | 45.90% | 10,544 | 24.52% | 174 | 0.40% | -7,194 | -16.73% | 43,006 |
| Monroe | 4,235 | 55.79% | 1,823 | 24.02% | 1,505 | 19.83% | 28 | 0.37% | 2,412 | 31.77% | 7,591 |
| Montgomery | 108,017 | 41.27% | 104,751 | 40.02% | 47,854 | 18.28% | 1,098 | 0.42% | 3,266 | 1.25% | 261,720 |
| Morgan | 2,402 | 35.81% | 2,719 | 40.54% | 1,551 | 23.13% | 35 | 0.52% | -317 | -4.73% | 6,707 |
| Morrow | 3,907 | 30.54% | 5,208 | 40.72% | 3,623 | 28.32% | 53 | 0.41% | -1,301 | -10.18% | 12,791 |
| Muskingum | 11,670 | 33.61% | 14,168 | 40.81% | 8,731 | 25.15% | 151 | 0.43% | -2,498 | -7.20% | 34,720 |
| Noble | 2,201 | 37.41% | 2,223 | 37.79% | 1,429 | 24.29% | 30 | 0.51% | -22 | -0.38% | 5,883 |
| Ottawa | 8,128 | 41.06% | 6,782 | 34.26% | 4,832 | 24.41% | 53 | 0.27% | 1,346 | 6.80% | 19,795 |
| Paulding | 3,293 | 34.63% | 3,652 | 38.40% | 2,510 | 26.39% | 55 | 0.58% | -359 | -3.77% | 9,510 |
| Perry | 4,972 | 36.70% | 4,712 | 34.78% | 3,810 | 28.12% | 53 | 0.39% | 260 | 1.92% | 13,547 |
| Pickaway | 5,765 | 30.45% | 8,690 | 45.91% | 4,319 | 22.82% | 156 | 0.82% | -2,925 | -15.46% | 18,930 |
| Pike | 5,057 | 44.39% | 4,094 | 35.93% | 2,192 | 19.24% | 50 | 0.44% | 963 | 8.46% | 11,393 |
| Portage | 26,325 | 42.37% | 18,447 | 29.69% | 17,065 | 27.46% | 298 | 0.48% | 7,878 | 12.68% | 62,135 |
| Preble | 5,557 | 30.71% | 8,023 | 44.33% | 4,460 | 24.64% | 58 | 0.32% | -2,466 | -13.62% | 18,098 |
| Putnam | 3,962 | 23.30% | 9,338 | 54.92% | 3,648 | 21.45% | 56 | 0.33% | -5,376 | -31.62% | 17,004 |
| Richland | 19,606 | 34.58% | 23,532 | 41.50% | 13,370 | 23.58% | 189 | 0.33% | -3,926 | -6.92% | 56,697 |
| Ross | 10,452 | 38.46% | 10,825 | 39.84% | 5,616 | 20.67% | 280 | 1.03% | -373 | -1.38% | 27,173 |
| Sandusky | 9,878 | 35.96% | 10,772 | 39.21% | 6,682 | 24.32% | 140 | 0.51% | -894 | -3.25% | 27,472 |
| Scioto | 14,715 | 43.76% | 11,931 | 35.48% | 6,860 | 20.40% | 118 | 0.35% | 2,784 | 8.28% | 33,624 |
| Seneca | 9,280 | 35.49% | 9,763 | 37.33% | 6,967 | 26.64% | 140 | 0.54% | -483 | -1.84% | 26,150 |
| Shelby | 5,262 | 26.30% | 8,854 | 44.25% | 5,835 | 29.16% | 60 | 0.30% | 3,019 | -15.09% | -20,011 |
| Stark | 70,064 | 40.02% | 61,863 | 35.33% | 42,413 | 24.22% | 752 | 0.43% | 8,201 | 4.69% | 175,092 |
| Summit | 107,881 | 44.67% | 77,530 | 32.10% | 55,151 | 22.84% | 930 | 0.39% | 30,351 | 12.57% | 241,492 |
| Trumbull | 54,591 | 50.73% | 25,831 | 24.01% | 26,791 | 24.90% | 393 | 0.37% | 27,800 (Note: In this county where Perot ran ahead of Bush, margin given is Clinton vote minus Perot vote and percentage is Clinton percentage minus Perot percentage.) | 25.83% | 107,606 |
| Tuscarawas | 14,787 | 40.08% | 13,179 | 35.72% | 8,785 | 23.81% | 143 | 0.39% | 1,608 | 4.36% | 36,894 |
| Union | 3,465 | 23.45% | 7,818 | 52.91% | 3,433 | 23.23% | 61 | 0.41% | -4,353 | -29.46% | 14,777 |
| Van Wert | 3,822 | 26.88% | 7,227 | 50.83% | 3,102 | 21.82% | 66 | 0.46% | -3,405 | -23.95% | 14,217 |
| Vinton | 2,308 | 43.04% | 1,975 | 36.83% | 1,050 | 19.58% | 30 | 0.56% | 333 | 6.21% | 5,363 |
| Warren | 13,542 | 25.65% | 27,998 | 53.02% | 11,115 | 21.05% | 147 | 0.28% | -14,456 | -27.37% | 52,802 |
| Washington | 10,380 | 36.98% | 12,204 | 43.47% | 5,415 | 19.29% | 74 | 0.26% | -1,824 | -6.49% | 28,073 |
| Wayne | 13,953 | 33.24% | 18,350 | 43.71% | 9,482 | 22.59% | 197 | 0.47% | -4,397 | -10.47% | 41,982 |
| Williams | 4,862 | 27.84% | 7,614 | 43.60% | 4,902 | 28.07% | 86 | 0.49% | 2,712 | -15.53% | -17,464 |
| Wood | 20,754 | 39.01% | 20,579 | 38.68% | 11,682 | 21.96% | 188 | 0.35% | 175 | 0.33% | 53,203 |
| Wyandot | 3,031 | 29.02% | 4,411 | 42.24% | 2,929 | 28.05% | 72 | 0.69% | -1,380 | -13.22% | 10,443 |
| Totals | 1,984,942 | 40.18% | 1,894,310 | 38.35% | 1,036,426 | 20.98% | 24,286 | 0.49% | 90,632 | 1.83% | 4,939,964 |

County Flips: Democratic Hold Gain from Republican / Republican Hold

==== Counties that flipped from Republican to Democratic ====
- Carroll
- Clark
- Coshocton
- Erie
- Guernsey
- Hocking
- Lawrence
- Meigs
- Montgomery
- Ottawa
- Perry
- Pike
- Portage
- Ross
- Stark
- Tuscarawas
- Vinton
- Wood

== See also ==
- United States presidential elections in Ohio
- Presidency of Bill Clinton
