= Alvordton, Ohio =

- CDP
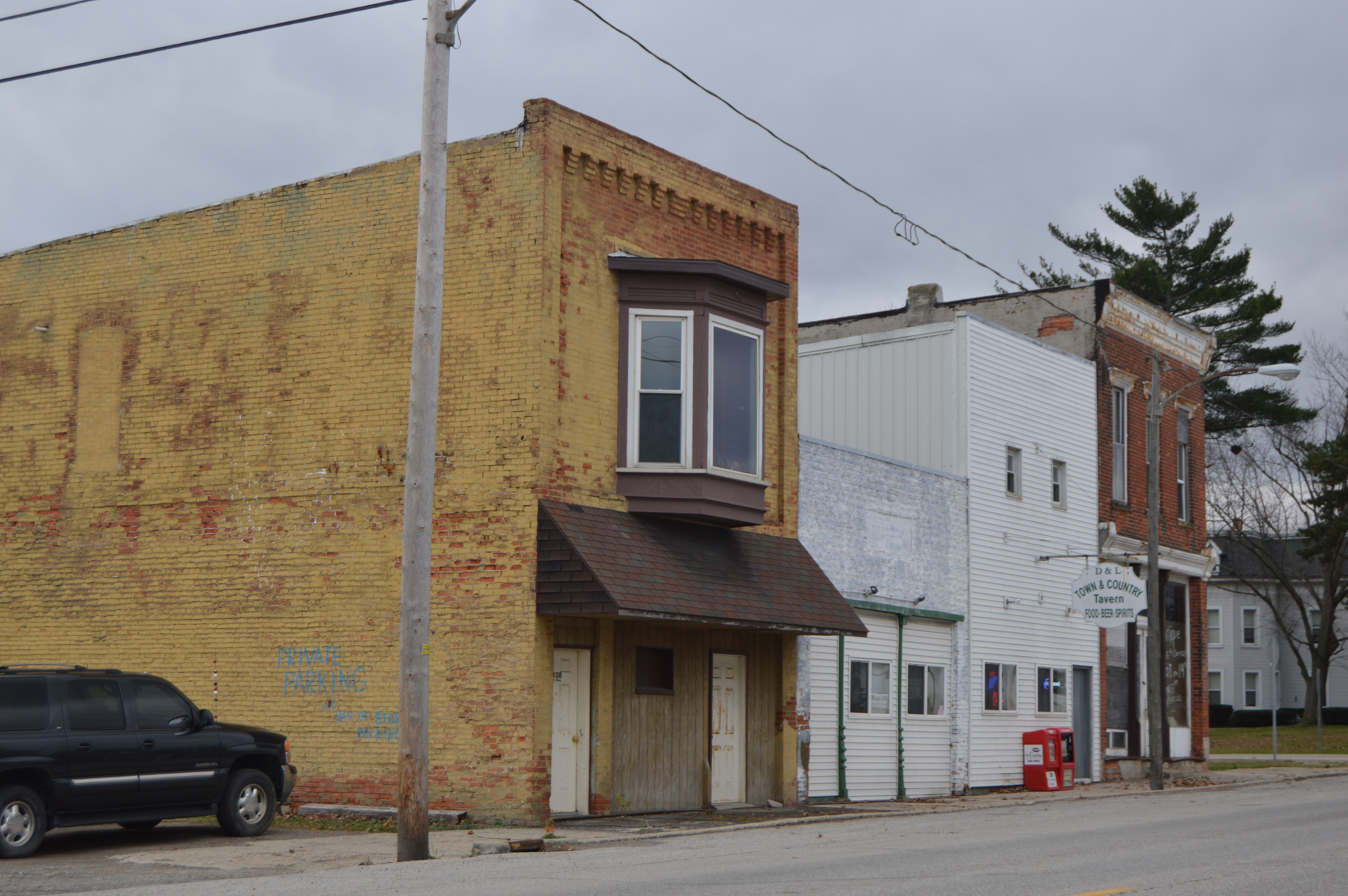
- Main Street

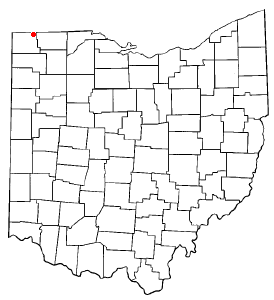
- Location of Alvordton, Ohio

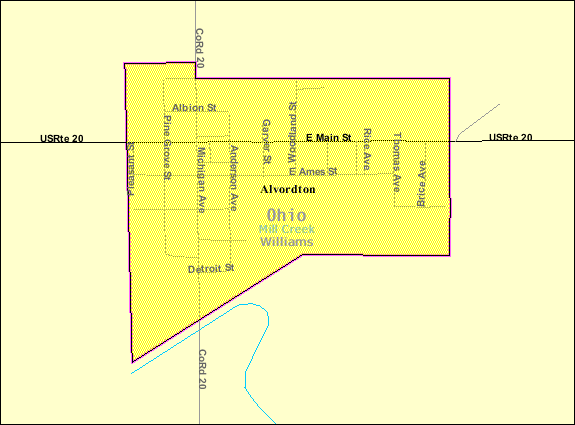
- Detailed map of Alvordton
- Coordinates: 41°39′53″N 84°26′05″W
- Country: United States
- State: Ohio
- County: Williams

Area
  - Total: 0.25 sq mi (0.65 km^{2})
  - Land: 0.25 sq mi (0.65 km^{2})
  - Water: 0 sq mi (0.00 km^{2})
- Elevation: 853 ft (260 m)

Population (2020)
  - Total: 200
  - Density: 793.5/sq mi (306.39/km^{2})
- Time zone: UTC-5 (Eastern (EST))
  - Summer (DST): UTC-4 (EDT)
- ZIP code: 43501
- Area code: 419
- FIPS code: 39-01588
- GNIS feature ID: 2628857

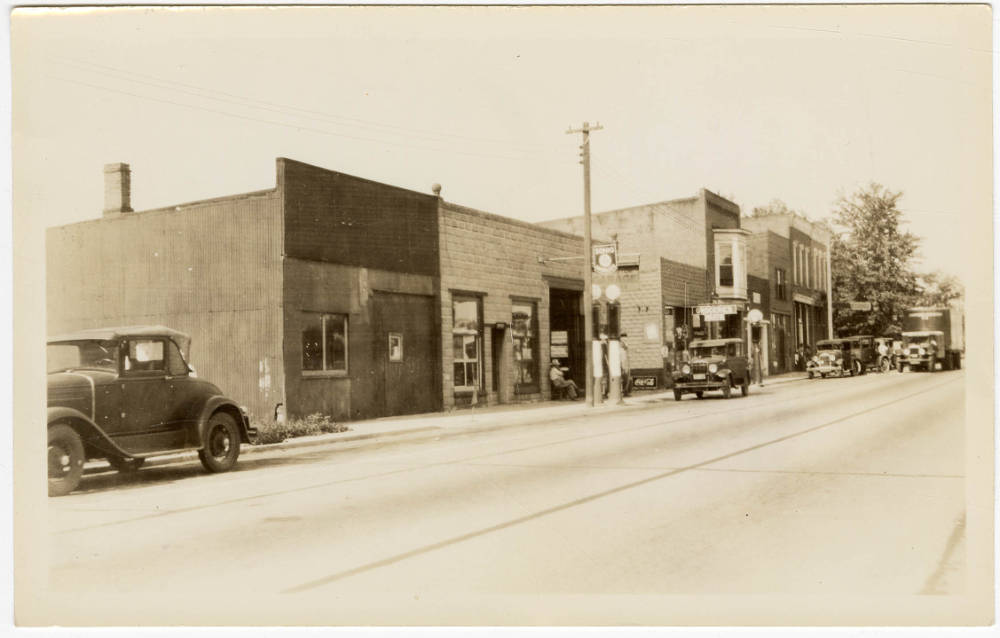
Alvordton, Ohio. Main Street. 1930s

Alvordton is a census-designated place in central Mill Creek Township, Williams County, Ohio, United States. The population was 200 at the 2020 census.

== History ==
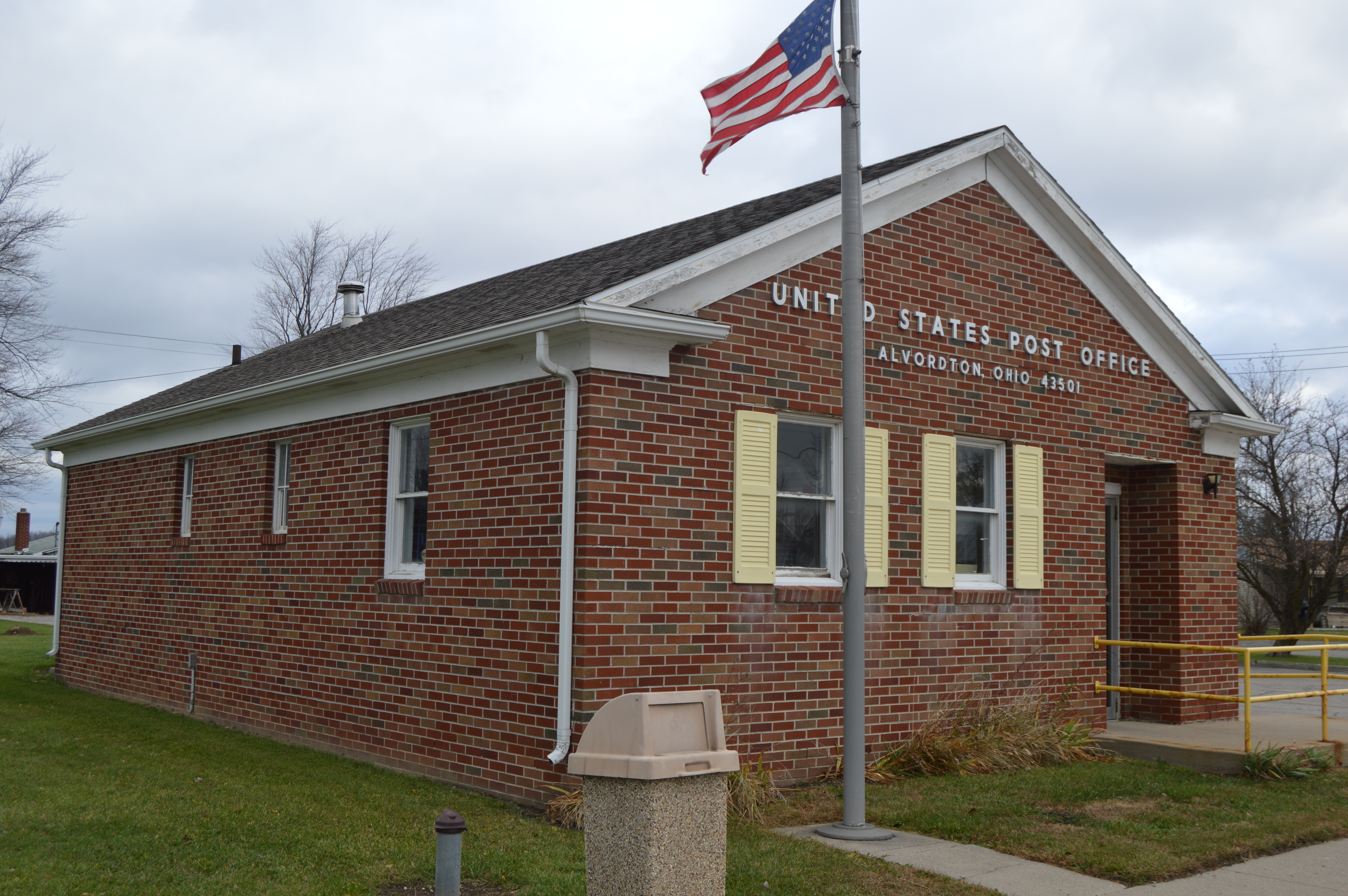
Alvordton post office, November 2015

Alvordton had its start when the railroad was extended to that point. Alvordton was platted in 1881 by Henry D. Alvord, and named for him. A post office has been in operation at Alvordton since 1881. The community incorporated as a village in 1891. Municipal status continued until 2007, when voters overwhelmingly approved a measure to disincorporate. In 2010, the U.S. Census Bureau listed Alvordton as a census-designated place.

== Geography ==
According to the 2010 census, the CDP has a total area of 0.25 square miles (0.65 km^{2}), all land.

== Demographics ==
Historical population
Census	Pop.	Note	%±
2020	200		—
U.S. Decennial Census

As of the census of 2000, there were 305 people, 102 households, and 72 families residing in the village. The population density was 1,183.6 inhabitants per square mile (457.0/km^{2}). There were 115 housing units at an average density of 446.3 per square mile (172.3/km^{2}). The racial makeup of the village was 94.43% White, 1.31% African American, 0.98% Native American, 1.64% from other races, and 1.64% from two or more races. Hispanic or Latino of any race were 3.61% of the population.

There were 102 households, out of which 31.4% had children under the age of 18 living with them, 48.0% were married couples living together, 15.7% had a female householder with no husband present, and 29.4% were non-families. 23.5% of all households were made up of individuals, and 10.8% had someone living alone who was 65 years of age or older. The average household size was 2.65 and the average family size was 3.03.

In the village the population was spread out, with 25.2% under the age of 18, 9.2% from 18 to 24, 28.5% from 25 to 44, 25.2% from 45 to 64, and 11.8% who were 65 years of age or older. The median age was 36 years. For every 100 females, there were 119.4 males. For every 100 females age 18 and over, there were 121.4 males.

The median income for a household in the village was $36,250, and the median income for a family was $43,375. Males had a median income of $25,000 versus $19,205 for females. The per capita income for the village was $16,525. About 8.4% of families and 11.5% of the population were below the poverty line, including 18.1% of those under the age of eighteen and 14.7% of those sixty five or over.

== Education ==
School-aged students in Alvordton attend school in the Millcreek-West Unity School District in nearby West Unity.

== See also ==
- List of census-designated places in Ohio
