= Lake Seneca, Ohio =

- CDP
- Interactive map of Lake Seneca, Ohio
- Coordinates: 41°40′12″N 84°38′39″W
- Country: United States
- State: Ohio
- County: Williams
- Elevation: 932 ft (284 m)

Population (2020)
  - Total: 529
- Time zone: UTC-5 (Eastern (EST))
  - Summer (DST): UTC-4 (EDT)
- GNIS feature ID: 2633228

Lake Seneca is a census-designated place in Williams County, in the U.S. state of Ohio. The population was 529 at the 2020 census.

== History ==
Lake Seneca had its start in 1966 as a lakeside planned community.
