= Williams County Courthouse =

- U.S. National Register of Historic Places
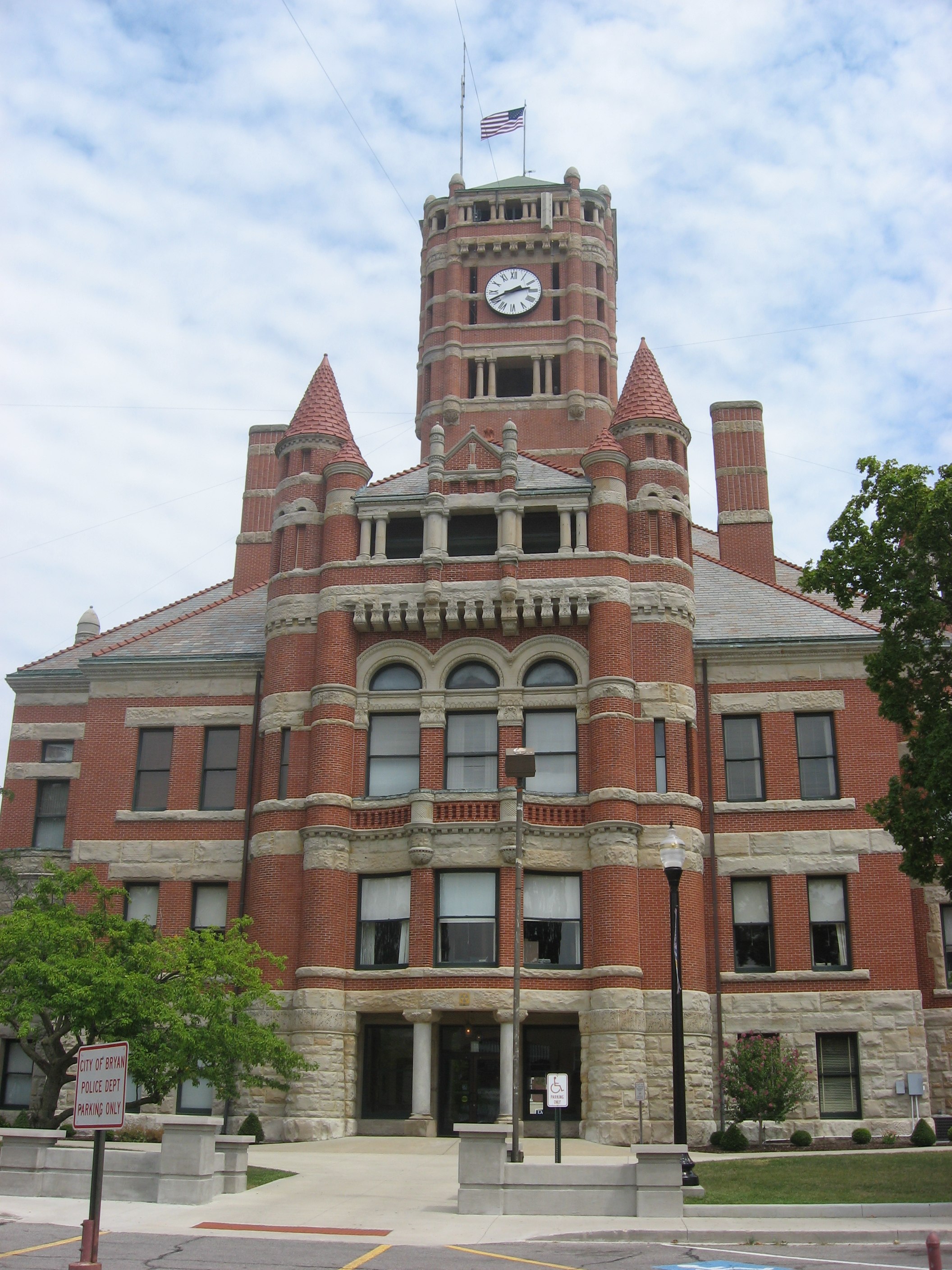

- Location within Ohio
- Interactive map showing the location of Williams County Courthouse
- Location: Main and High Sts., Bryan, Ohio
- Coordinates: 41°28′26″N 84°33′45″W
- Area: 2.6 acres (1.1 ha)
- Built: 1889-91
- Architect: E.O. Fallis and Company
- Architectural style: Romanesque
- NRHP reference No.: 73001552
- Added to NRHP: May 7, 1973

Williams County Courthouse, at the intersection of Main and High Streets in Bryan, is the county courthouse serving Williams County, Ohio. The courthouse was built in the late nineteenth century to replace an earlier courthouse; Bryan had been the Williams County seat since 1840. Architect E.O. Fallis of Toledo designed the courthouse in the Romanesque Revival style, which was nationally popular in the late nineteenth century. The design for the courthouse was approved by the county in 1888, and the building's cornerstone was placed the next year; construction was completed in 1891. The courthouse features a large clock tower at its center and eight turrets on its sides, with a large and a small turret atop each entrance bay.

The courthouse was added to the National Register of Historic Places on May 7, 1973.

== Gallery ==
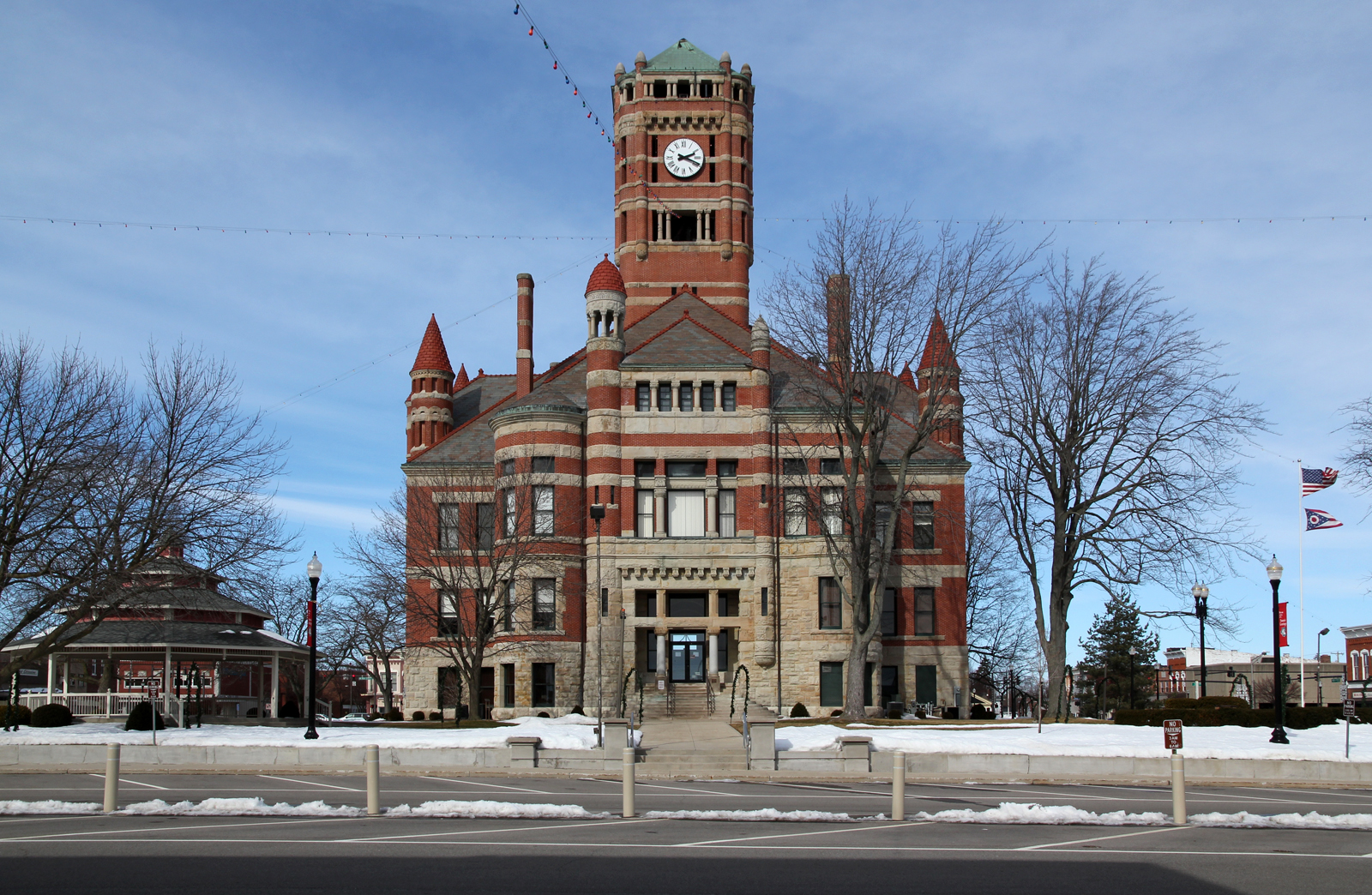
