= West Jefferson, Williams County, Ohio =

Unincorporated community in Ohio, U.S.

Coordinates: 41°34′19″N 84°33′24″W

West Jefferson is an unincorporated community in Williams County, in the U.S. state of Ohio.

== History ==
Former variant names of West Jefferson were Durbins Corners and Karle. A post office called Durbins Corners was established in 1850, the name was changed to Karle in 1882, and the post office closed in 1902. Aside from the post office, West Jefferson once had a country store.
