= Northwest Township, Williams County, Ohio =

Township in Ohio, US

- Township
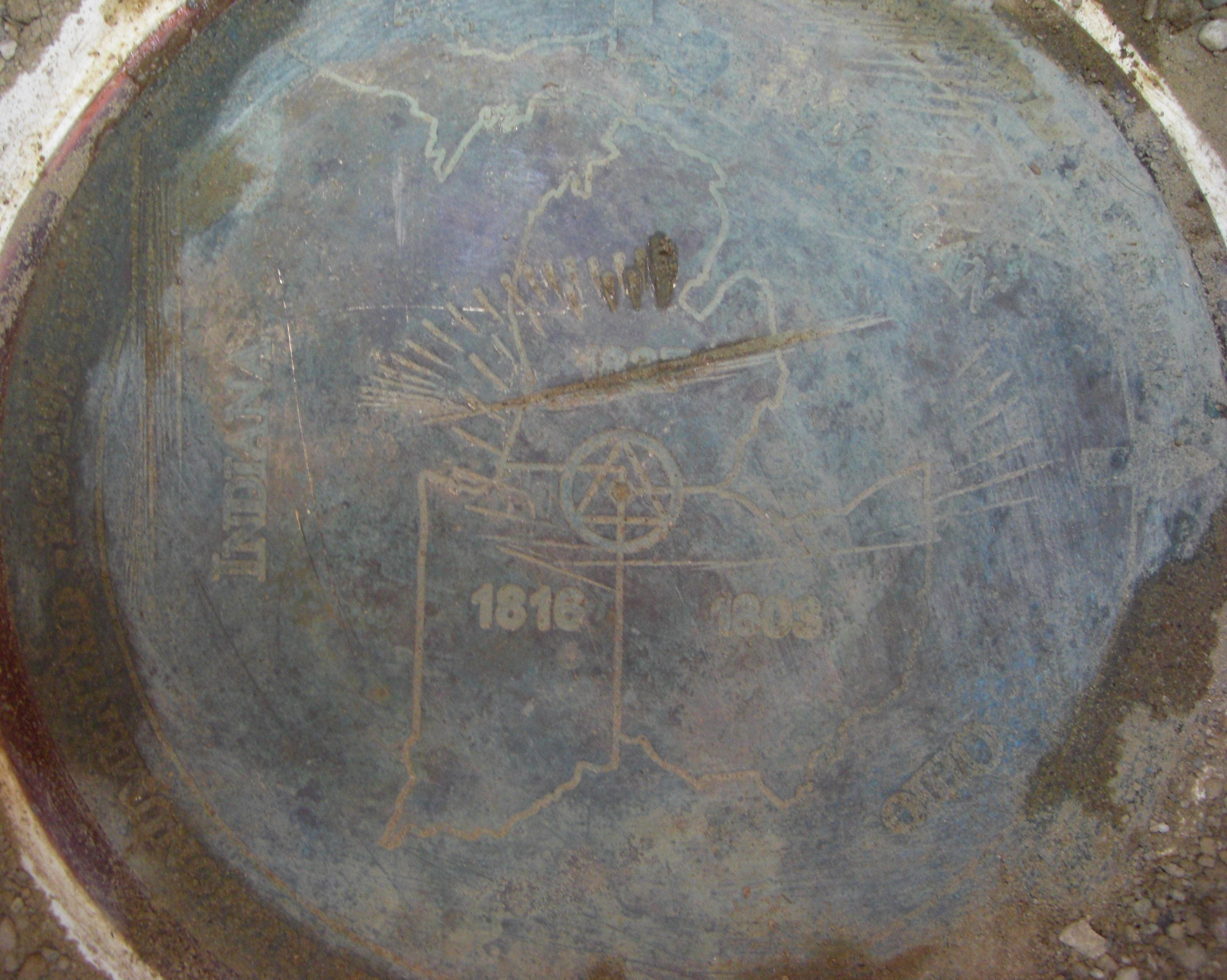
- Tripoint marker at Ohio's official northwestern corner

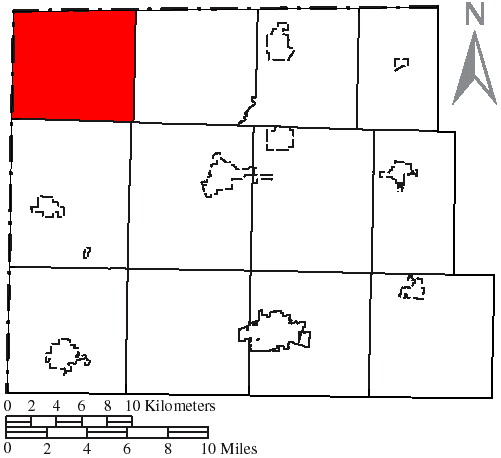
- Location of Northwest Township in Williams County
- Coordinates: 41°39′52″N 84°44′16″W
- Country: United States
- State: Ohio
- County: Williams

Area
  - Total: 33.0 sq mi (85.4 km^{2})
  - Land: 32.6 sq mi (84.5 km^{2})
  - Water: 0.35 sq mi (0.9 km^{2})
- Elevation: 981 ft (299 m)

Population (2020)
  - Total: 1,139
  - Density: 35/sq mi (13.5/km^{2})
- Time zone: UTC-5 (Eastern (EST))
  - Summer (DST): UTC-4 (EDT)
- FIPS code: 39-57162
- GNIS feature ID: 1087173

Northwest Township is one of the twelve townships of Williams County, Ohio, United States. The 2020 census found 1,139 people in the township.

== Geography ==
Located in the northwestern corner of the county, and of the state, along both the Indiana state line and the Michigan state line, it borders the following townships:

- Camden Township, Hillsdale County, Michigan - north
- Amboy Township, Hillsdale County, Michigan - northeast
- Bridgewater Township - east
- Superior Township - southeast corner
- Florence Township - south
- Richland Township, Steuben County, Indiana - southwest
- York Township, Steuben County, Indiana - west

No municipalities are located in Northwest Township. The township lies within the Toledo Strip, a contested ribbon of land over which Ohio and Michigan came to blows in an 1835–36 confrontation known as the Toledo War.

The unincorporated community of Nettle Lake, also a census-designated place, is in the northern part of the township, at the south end of the lake of the same name.

== Name and history ==
Northwest Township was organized in 1840, and named for the fact the extreme northwestern point of Ohio is located within its borders. It is the only Northwest Township statewide.

== Government ==
The township is governed by a three-member board of trustees, who are elected in November of odd-numbered years to a four-year term beginning on the following January 1. Two are elected in the year after the presidential election and one is elected in the year before it. There is also an elected township fiscal officer, who serves a four-year term beginning on April 1 of the year after the election, which is held in November of the year before the presidential election. Vacancies in the fiscal officership or on the board of trustees are filled by the remaining trustees.
