= Nettle Lake, Ohio =

- Census-designated place
- Location within Ohio Location within the United States
- Coordinates: 41°40′43″N 84°43′37″W
- Country: United States
- State: Ohio
- County: Williams
- Township: Northwest

Area
  - Total: 0.37 sq mi (0.95 km^{2})
  - Land: 0.25 sq mi (0.66 km^{2})
  - Water: 0.11 sq mi (0.29 km^{2})
- Elevation: 942 ft (287 m)

Population (2020)
  - Total: 210
  - Density: 824.9/sq mi (318.48/km^{2})
- Time zone: UTC-5 (Eastern (EST))
  - Summer (DST): UTC-4 (EDT)
- ZIP Code: 43543 (Montpelier)
- Area codes: 419/567
- FIPS code: 39-53914
- GNIS feature ID: 2628938

Nettle Lake is an unincorporated community and census-designated place (CDP) in Williams County, Ohio, United States, around the south end of the lake of the same name. It was first listed as a CDP following the 2010 census. As of the 2020 census, Nettle Lake had a population of 210.

The CDP is in the northwest corner of Ohio, in the northern part of Williams County's Northwest Township. It is 1 mile (1.6 km) south of the Michigan border, 4 miles (6 km) east of the Indiana border, and 13 miles (21 km) northwest of Montpelier, Ohio. Nettle Lake drains out of its northern end into Nettle Creek, which flows southeast to the St. Joseph River, a southwest-flowing major tributary of the Maumee River, which flows northeast to Lake Erie at Toledo .

== Demographics ==
Historical population
Census	Pop.	Note	%±
2020	210		—
U.S. Decennial Census
