= Williams County, Ohio =

County in Ohio, United States

- County
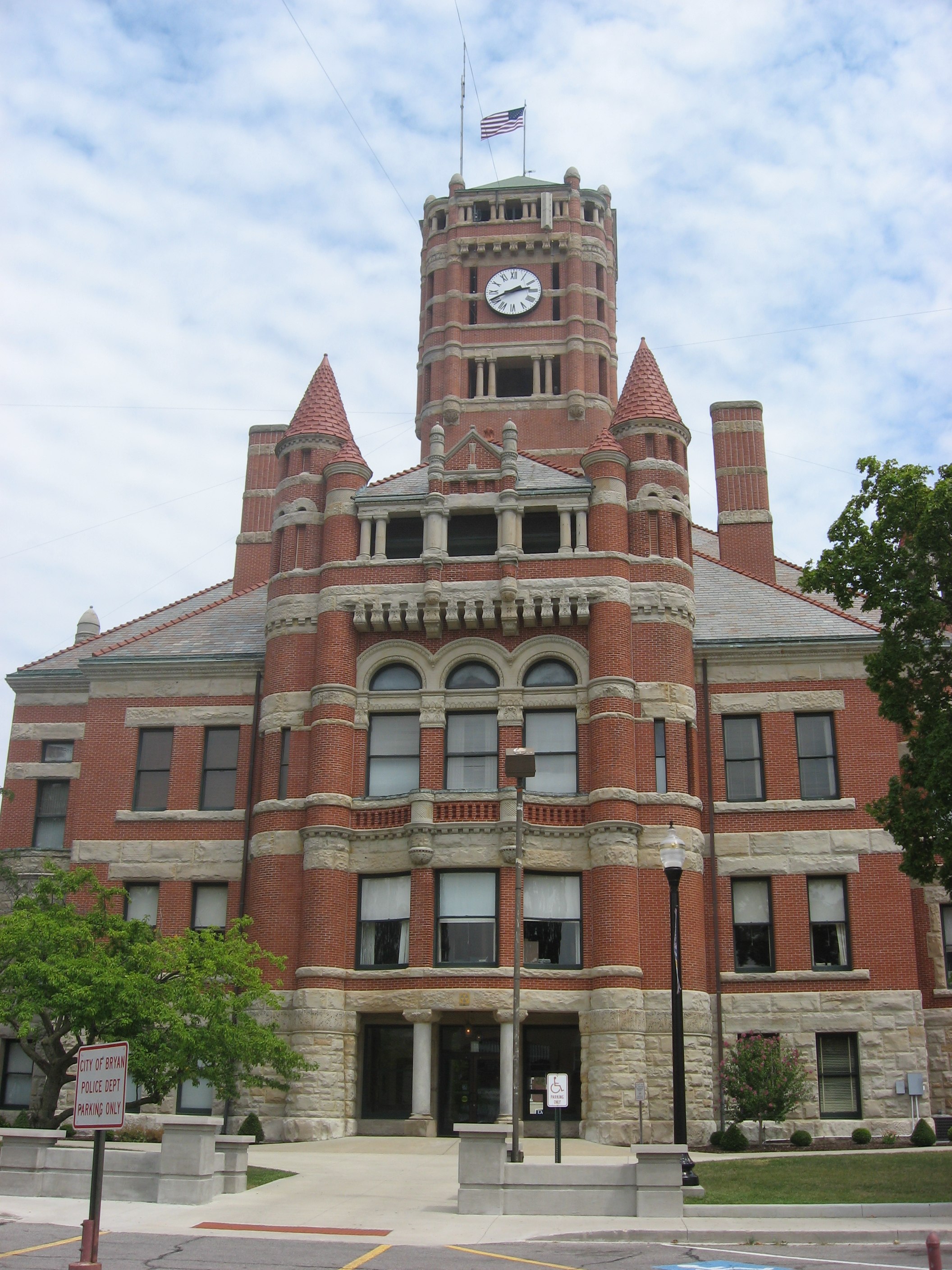
- The Williams County Courthouse in Bryan.

- Flag Seal

- Location within the U.S. state of Ohio
- Coordinates: 41.564959°N 84.584324°W
- Country: United States
- State: Ohio
- Founded: April 1, 1820 (created); February 2, 1824 (organized)
- Named for: David Williams
- Seat: Bryan
- Largest city: Bryan

Area
  - Total: 423.092 sq mi (1,095.80 km^{2})
  - Land: 420.660 sq mi (1,089.50 km^{2})
  - Water: 2.432 sq mi (6.30 km^{2}) 0.57%

Population (2020)
  - Total: 37,102
  - Estimate (2025): 36,549 ▼
  - Density: 86.894/sq mi (33.550/km^{2})
- Time zone: UTC−5 (Eastern)
  - Summer (DST): UTC−4 (EDT)
- Area code: 419 and 567
- Congressional district: 9th
- Website: williamscountyoh.gov

Williams County is a county located in the U.S. state of Ohio. As of the 2020 census, the population was 37,102, and was estimated to be 36,549 in 2025. The county seat and the largest city is Bryan.

== History ==
The county was created on April 1, 1820 and later organized on February 2, 1824. It is named for David Williams, one of the captors of John André in the American Revolutionary War.

== Geography ==
According to the United States Census Bureau, the county has a total area of 423.092 square miles (1,095.80 km^{2}), of which 420.660 square miles (1,089.50 km^{2}) is land and 2.432 square miles (6.30 km^{2}) (0.57%) is water. It is the 53rd largest county in Ohio by total area.

=== Adjacent counties ===
- Hillsdale County, Michigan (north)
- Fulton County (east)
- Henry County (southeast)
- Defiance County (south)
- DeKalb County, Indiana (southwest)
- Steuben County, Indiana (northwest)

== Demographics ==
Historical population
| Census | Pop. | Note | %± |
|---|---|---|---|
| 1830 | 387 | | — |
| 1840 | 4,465 | | 1,053.7% |
| 1850 | 8,018 | | 79.6% |
| 1860 | 16,633 | | 107.4% |
| 1870 | 20,991 | | 26.2% |
| 1880 | 23,821 | | 13.5% |
| 1890 | 24,897 | | 4.5% |
| 1900 | 24,953 | | 0.2% |
| 1910 | 25,198 | | 1.0% |
| 1920 | 24,627 | | −2.3% |
| 1930 | 24,316 | | −1.3% |
| 1940 | 25,510 | | 4.9% |
| 1950 | 26,202 | | 2.7% |
| 1960 | 29,968 | | 14.4% |
| 1970 | 33,669 | | 12.3% |
| 1980 | 36,369 | | 8.0% |
| 1990 | 36,956 | | 1.6% |
| 2000 | 39,188 | | 6.0% |
| 2010 | 37,642 | | −3.9% |
| 2020 | 37,102 | | −1.4% |
| 2025 (est.) | 36,549 | ▼ | −1.5% |
U.S. Decennial Census; 1790–1960 1900–1990; 1990–2000 2010–2020

As of the fourth quarter of 2024, the median home value in Williams County was $150,917.

As of the 2023 American Community Survey, there are 15,455 estimated households in Williams County with an average of 2.32 persons per household. The county has a median household income of $61,834. Approximately 11.1% of the county's population lives at or below the poverty line. Williams County has an estimated 61.6% employment rate, with 14.2% of the population holding a bachelor's degree or higher and 91.4% holding a high school diploma.

The top five reported ancestries (people were allowed to report up to two ancestries, thus the figures will generally add to more than 100%) were English (96.3%), Spanish (2.4%), Indo-European (0.7%), Asian and Pacific Islander (0.6%), and Other (0.1%).

The median age in the county was 41.8 years.

=== 2024 estimate ===
As of the 2024 estimate, there were 36,554 people and 15,455 households residing in the county. There were 16,624 housing units at an average density of 39.52 per square mile (15.3/km^{2}). The racial makeup of the county was 96.1% White (91.1% NH White), 1.4% African American, 0.4% Native American, 0.6% Asian, 0.0% Pacific Islander, _% from some other races and 1.4% from two or more races. Hispanic or Latino people of any race were 5.6% of the population.

=== 2020 census ===
As of the 2020 census, there were 37,102 people, 15,262 households, and 9,858 families residing in the county. The population density was 88.2 inhabitants per square mile (34.1/km^{2}). There were 16,561 housing units at an average density of 39.37 per square mile (15.2/km^{2}).

The racial makeup of the county was 92.1% White, 0.9% Black or African American, 0.2% American Indian and Alaska Native, 0.5% Asian, <0.1% Native Hawaiian and Pacific Islander, 1.8% from some other race, and 4.5% from two or more races. Hispanic or Latino residents of any race comprised 5.0% of the population.

The median age was 42.3 years, with 22.2% of residents under the age of 18 and 20.0% aged 65 years or older. For every 100 females there were 100.0 males, and for every 100 females age 18 and over there were 99.5 males.

There were 15,262 households in the county, of which 27.4% had children under the age of 18 living in them. Of all households, 48.7% were married-couple households, 19.3% were households with a male householder and no spouse or partner present, and 24.2% were households with a female householder and no spouse or partner present. About 29.7% of all households were made up of individuals and 13.7% had someone living alone who was 65 years of age or older.

There were 16,561 housing units, of which 7.8% were vacant. Among occupied housing units, 74.3% were owner-occupied and 25.7% were renter-occupied. The homeowner vacancy rate was 1.4% and the rental vacancy rate was 6.3%.

24.9% of residents lived in urban areas, while 75.1% lived in rural areas.

=== Racial and ethnic composition ===
Williams County, Ohio – Racial and ethnic composition Note: the US Census treats Hispanic/Latino as an ethnic category. This table excludes Latinos from the racial categories and assigns them to a separate category. Hispanics/Latinos may be of any race.
| Race / ethnicity (NH = Non-Hispanic) | Pop 1980 | Pop 1990 | Pop 2000 | Pop 2010 | Pop 2020 | % 1980 | % 1990 | % 2000 | % 2010 | % 2020 |
|---|---|---|---|---|---|---|---|---|---|---|
| White alone (NH) | 35,544 | 35,934 | 37,338 | 35,283 | 33,483 | 97.73% | 97.23% | 95.28% | 93.73% | 90.25% |
| Black or African American alone (NH) | 9 | 20 | 278 | 358 | 323 | 0.02% | 0.05% | 0.71% | 0.95% | 0.87% |
| Native American or Alaska Native alone (NH) | 49 | 44 | 77 | 65 | 55 | 0.13% | 0.12% | 0.20% | 0.17% | 0.15% |
| Asian alone (NH) | 63 | 125 | 199 | 212 | 198 | 0.17% | 0.34% | 0.51% | 0.56% | 0.53% |
| Native Hawaiian or Pacific Islander alone (NH) | x | x | 3 | 7 | 0 | x | x | 0.01% | 0.02% | 0.00% |
| Other race alone (NH) | 30 | 7 | 12 | 14 | 92 | 0.08% | 0.02% | 0.03% | 0.04% | 0.25% |
| Mixed race or Multiracial (NH) | x | x | 232 | 313 | 1,089 | x | x | 0.59% | 0.83% | 2.94% |
| Hispanic or Latino (any race) | 674 | 826 | 1,049 | 1,390 | 1,862 | 1.85% | 2.24% | 2.68% | 3.69% | 5.02% |
| Total | 36,369 | 36,956 | 39,188 | 37,642 | 37,102 | 100.00% | 100.00% | 100.00% | 100.00% | 100.00% |

=== 2010 census ===
As of the 2010 census, there were 37,642 people, 15,075 households, and 10,260 families residing in the county. The population density was 89.4 inhabitants per square mile (34.5/km^{2}). There were 16,668 housing units at an average density of 39.59 per square mile (15.3/km^{2}). The racial makeup of the county was 95.95% White, 0.96% African American, 0.23% Native American, 0.57% Asian, 0.02% Pacific Islander, 1.08% from some other races and 1.19% from two or more races. Hispanic or Latino people of any race were 3.69% of the population.

In terms of ancestry, 46.1% were German, 12.0% were Irish, 10.7% were English, and 7.8% were American.

There were 15,075 households, 31.0% had children under the age of 18 living with them, 53.0% were married couples living together, 9.9% had a female householder with no husband present, 31.9% were non-families, and 27.0% of all households were made up of individuals. The average household size was 2.43 and the average family size was 2.93. The median age was 40.7 years.

The median income for a household in the county was $44,538 and the median income for a family was $52,975. Males had a median income of $40,658 versus $29,064 for females. The per capita income for the county was $21,381. About 9.1% of families and 11.8% of the population were below the poverty line, including 17.6% of those under age 18 and 8.6% of those age 65 or over.

== Politics ==
Williams County is a Republican stronghold county in presidential elections. The last Democrat to win the county was Lyndon B. Johnson in 1964.

United States presidential election results for Williams County, Ohio
| Year | Republican | | Democratic | | Third party(ies) | |
| Year | No. | % | No. | % | No. | % |
|---|---|---|---|---|---|---|
| 1856 | 1,327 | 55.34% | 1,022 | 42.62% | 49 | 2.04% |
| 1860 | 1,713 | 56.52% | 1,180 | 38.93% | 138 | 4.55% |
| 1864 | 2,154 | 60.27% | 1,420 | 39.73% | 0 | 0.00% |
| 1868 | 2,280 | 55.69% | 1,814 | 44.31% | 0 | 0.00% |
| 1872 | 2,213 | 59.84% | 1,419 | 38.37% | 66 | 1.78% |
| 1876 | 2,701 | 51.26% | 2,546 | 48.32% | 22 | 0.42% |
| 1880 | 2,881 | 50.92% | 2,596 | 45.88% | 181 | 3.20% |
| 1884 | 2,907 | 48.62% | 2,897 | 48.45% | 175 | 2.93% |
| 1888 | 3,071 | 48.99% | 2,977 | 47.50% | 220 | 3.51% |
| 1892 | 2,745 | 46.76% | 2,583 | 44.00% | 542 | 9.23% |
| 1896 | 3,191 | 47.16% | 3,530 | 52.17% | 45 | 0.67% |
| 1900 | 3,416 | 51.70% | 3,049 | 46.15% | 142 | 2.15% |
| 1904 | 3,827 | 57.91% | 2,565 | 38.82% | 216 | 3.27% |
| 1908 | 3,625 | 50.84% | 3,329 | 46.69% | 176 | 2.47% |
| 1912 | 1,145 | 17.85% | 2,875 | 44.81% | 2,396 | 37.34% |
| 1916 | 3,132 | 45.57% | 3,552 | 51.68% | 189 | 2.75% |
| 1920 | 7,000 | 61.75% | 4,183 | 36.90% | 153 | 1.35% |
| 1924 | 5,802 | 56.41% | 2,795 | 27.18% | 1,688 | 16.41% |
| 1928 | 8,138 | 71.81% | 3,136 | 27.67% | 58 | 0.51% |
| 1932 | 5,459 | 43.34% | 6,860 | 54.46% | 278 | 2.21% |
| 1936 | 7,050 | 53.00% | 5,628 | 42.31% | 624 | 4.69% |
| 1940 | 9,463 | 69.95% | 4,065 | 30.05% | 0 | 0.00% |
| 1944 | 8,738 | 71.89% | 3,417 | 28.11% | 0 | 0.00% |
| 1948 | 6,784 | 64.79% | 3,662 | 34.98% | 24 | 0.23% |
| 1952 | 9,888 | 74.65% | 3,358 | 25.35% | 0 | 0.00% |
| 1956 | 9,784 | 75.21% | 3,225 | 24.79% | 0 | 0.00% |
| 1960 | 10,319 | 71.84% | 4,044 | 28.16% | 0 | 0.00% |
| 1964 | 5,653 | 42.83% | 7,547 | 57.17% | 0 | 0.00% |
| 1968 | 8,059 | 59.76% | 4,456 | 33.04% | 970 | 7.19% |
| 1972 | 9,083 | 66.76% | 4,278 | 31.44% | 244 | 1.79% |
| 1976 | 7,596 | 59.52% | 4,920 | 38.55% | 246 | 1.93% |
| 1980 | 9,146 | 64.31% | 4,015 | 28.23% | 1,060 | 7.45% |
| 1984 | 10,804 | 74.11% | 3,624 | 24.86% | 150 | 1.03% |
| 1988 | 10,782 | 69.18% | 4,666 | 29.94% | 137 | 0.88% |
| 1992 | 7,614 | 43.60% | 4,862 | 27.84% | 4,988 | 28.56% |
| 1996 | 7,747 | 49.67% | 5,524 | 35.41% | 2,327 | 14.92% |
| 2000 | 9,941 | 62.45% | 5,454 | 34.26% | 524 | 3.29% |
| 2004 | 12,040 | 64.60% | 6,481 | 34.77% | 118 | 0.63% |
| 2008 | 9,879 | 53.70% | 8,174 | 44.43% | 343 | 1.86% |
| 2012 | 10,047 | 56.74% | 7,266 | 41.04% | 393 | 2.22% |
| 2016 | 11,939 | 68.98% | 4,358 | 25.18% | 1,011 | 5.84% |
| 2020 | 13,452 | 72.12% | 4,842 | 25.96% | 357 | 1.91% |
| 2024 | 13,461 | 73.50% | 4,644 | 25.36% | 209 | 1.14% |

== Government ==
Williams County has three county commissioners who oversee the various county departments. Current commissioners are: Brian Davis, Lewis Hilkert, and Terry Rummel.

== Transportation ==
The Williams County Airport is located two nautical miles (2.3 mi; 3.7 km) east of Bryan's central business district.

== Communities ==
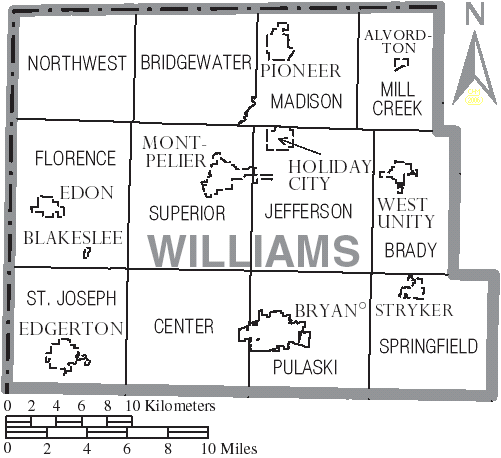
Map of Williams County, Ohio with municipal and township labels

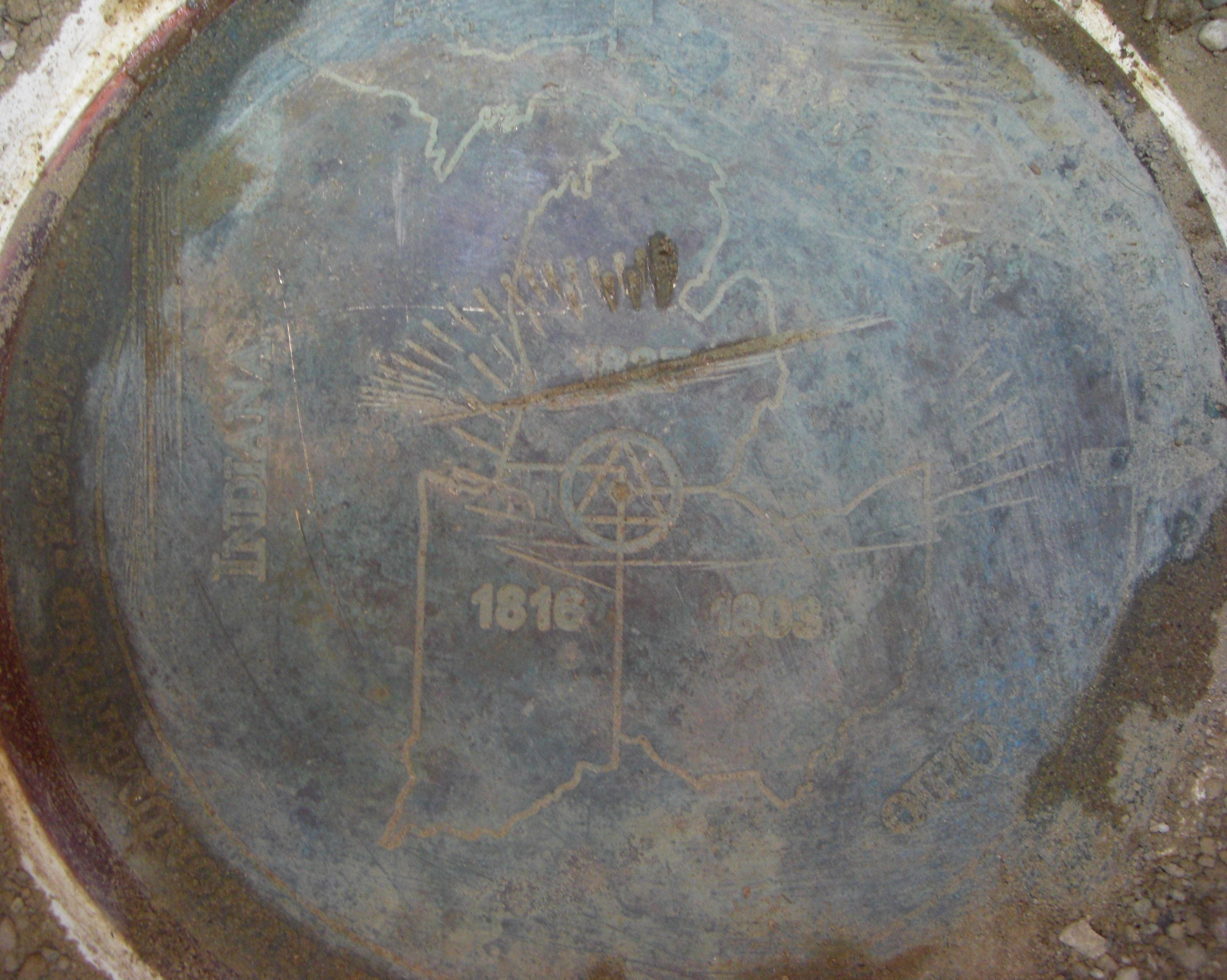
Williams County touches the states of Indiana and Michigan.

=== City ===
- Bryan (county seat)

=== Villages ===
- Blakeslee
- Edgerton
- Edon
- Holiday City
- Montpelier
- Pioneer
- Stryker
- West Unity

=== Townships ===
- Brady
- Bridgewater
- Center
- Florence
- Jefferson
- Madison
- Mill Creek
- Northwest
- Pulaski
- St. Joseph
- Springfield
- Superior

=== Census-designated places ===
- Alvordton
- Kunkle
- Lake Seneca
- Nettle Lake
- Pulaski

=== Unincorporated communities ===
- Berlin
- Bridgewater Center
- Columbia
- Cooney
- Hamer
- Lock Port
- Melbern
- Mina
- West Jefferson
- Williams Center

== See also ==
- National Register of Historic Places listings in Williams County, Ohio
