= Ohio State Route 545 =

State highway in northern Ohio, US

State Route 545

Route information
- Maintained by ODOT
- Length: 17.01 mi (27.37 km)
- Existed: 1937–present

Major junctions
- South end: SR 39 in Mansfield
- US 30 in Mansfield
- North end: US 250 / SR 60 in Savannah

Location
- Country: United States
- State: Ohio
- Counties: Richland, Ashland

Highway system
- Ohio State Highway System; Interstate; US; State; Scenic
← SR 544	→ SR 546

State Route 545 (SR 545) is a 17.01-mile (27.37 km) long north–south state highway in the northern portion of the U.S. state of Ohio. The southern terminus of SR 545 is at a T-intersection with SR 39 in the city of Mansfield. Its northern terminus is at the U.S. Route 250 (US 250) and SR 60 concurrency in the village of Savannah.

== Route description ==
The path of SR 545 takes it through the northeastern quadrant of Richland County and the northwestern part of Ashland County. No portion of SR 545 is included within the National Highway System (NHS), a network of highways identified as being most important for the economy, mobility and defense of the country.

The Ohio Department of Transportation (ODOT) is responsible for the maintenance and oversight of SR 545. In recent years, ODOT initiated a major rehabilitation project on this route, employing Full Depth Reclamation (FDR) techniques to replace the existing pavement. This project aimed to enhance the structural integrity and longevity of the roadway, ensuring safer and more efficient travel for motorists in Richland and Ashland Counties.

== History ==
SR 545 was applied in 1937. The highway originally consisted of the entirety of the existing SR 288, a portion of SR 97 from SR 288's eastern terminus east a short distance and the entire length of locally maintained Marion Avenue to the northeast of there into Mansfield. The segment of SR 97 and Marion Avenue that originally comprised SR 545 were part of a continuous stretch of roadway as of 1937. One year later, the highway was extended northeast from Mansfield along the entirety of its present alignment to its current northern terminus at the US 250/SR 60 concurrency in Savannah.

In 1949, the portion of SR 545 between the eastern terminus of SR 288 and Mansfield was removed from the state highway system, in preparation for construction of the Clear Fork Reservoir. A portion of the pavement of the former SR 545 was removed as a result of this. Consequently, SR 545 now existed in two disconnected segments, one along the length of what is now SR 288, and the other along its present routing. This situation would be resolved by 1953, when the southwestern segment of SR 545 was renamed as SR 288. As a result, SR 545 took on its present form.

== Major intersections ==
County	Location	mi	km	Destinations	Notes
Richland	Mansfield	0.00	0.00	SR 39 (East 5th Street)	
Richland	Madison Township–Mansfield municipal line	1.16	1.87	US 30 / Longview Avenue – Wooster, Bucyrus	Interchange; Exit 131A (US 30); eastbound US 30 via Longview Avenue.
Richland	Weller Township	10.39	16.72	SR 603	
Richland	Weller Township	10.55	16.98	SR 96 / CR 77 (Olivesburg Fitchburg Road) – Shelby, Ashland	
Ashland	Savannah	17.01	27.37	US 250 / SR 60 (Main Street) – New London, Ashland	
1.000 mi = 1.609 km; 1.000 km = 0.621 mi
