= Mohican State Park =

Park in Ohio, USA

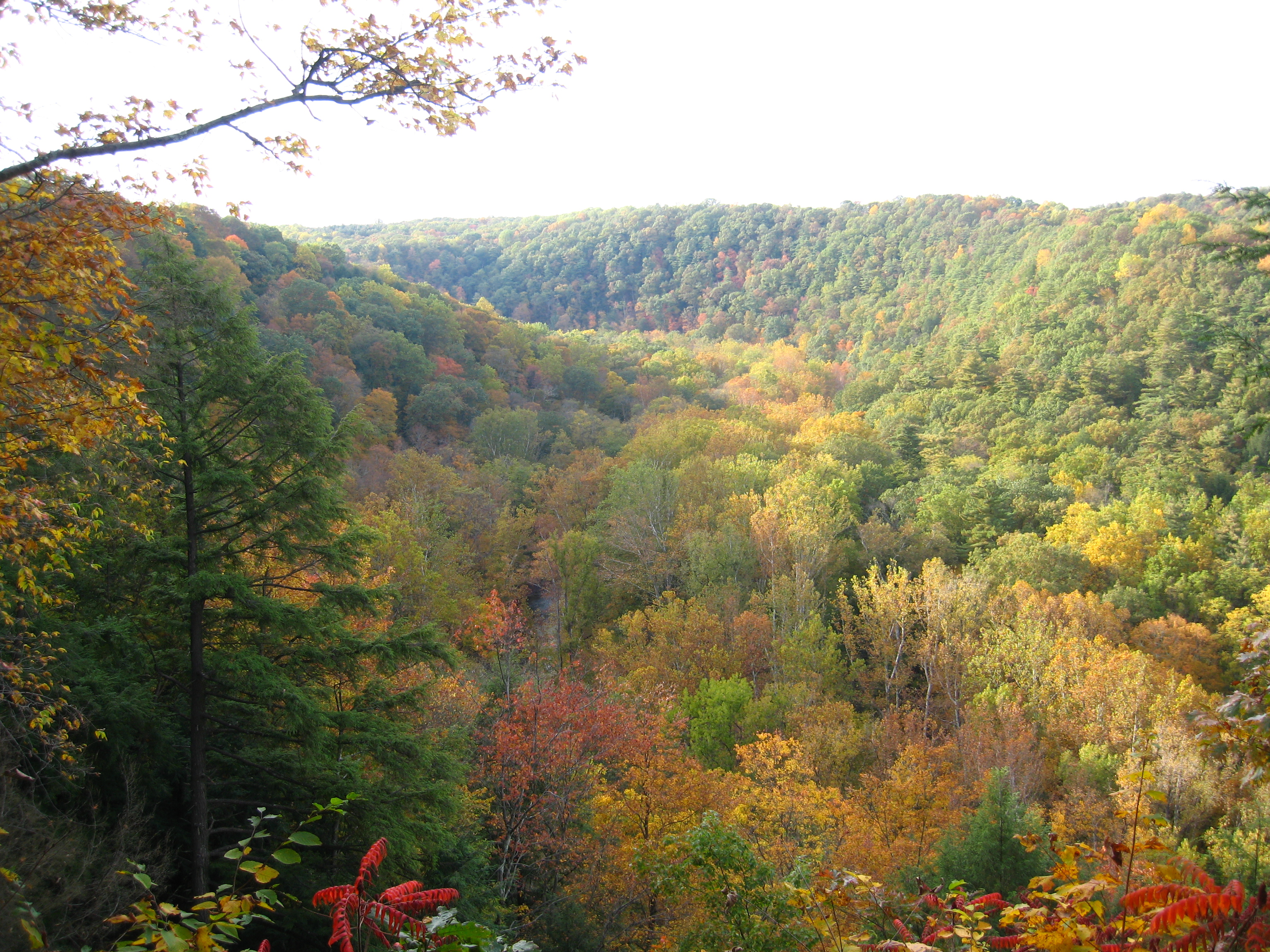
- Clear Fork Gorge as seen from the park overlook

- Location within Ohio Location within the United States
- Location: Ashland County, Ohio, United States
- Coordinates: 40°37′08″N 82°15′57″W
- Area: 1,110 acres (450 ha)
- Elevation: 991 ft (302 m)
- Established: 1949
- Administrator: Ohio Department of Natural Resources
- Designation: Ohio state park
- Website: Mohican State Park

Mohican State Park is a 1,110-acre (450 ha) public recreation area located on the south shore of Pleasant Hill Lake and along the Clear Fork of the Mohican River south of Loudonville in Ashland County, Ohio, United States. The state park is accessed from Ohio SR 3 and Ohio SR 97 and is surrounded by the 4,525-acre (1,831 ha) Mohican-Memorial State Forest. The Clear Fork flows through the park, carving a narrow gorge, and joins the Black Fork about a half-mile east of the park to form the Mohican River. The park is open for year-round recreation including camping, hiking, boating, mountain biking, fishing, and picnicking.

== History ==
Mohican State Park was originally called Clear Fork State Park when the Ohio Department of Natural Resources was created in 1949 and the park was created from Ohio Division of Forestry lands. In 1966, the name of the park was changed to Mohican to alleviate confusion between Clear Fork Reservoir in Mansfield, Ohio and the state park.

== Activities ==
=== Hiking ===
There are 13 miles (21 km) of hiking trails in Mohican State Park, plus an additional 32 miles (51 km) of hiking trails in the adjacent State Forest. The designated mountain bike trails and bridle paths are also available for the hiker to use.

=== Mountain biking ===
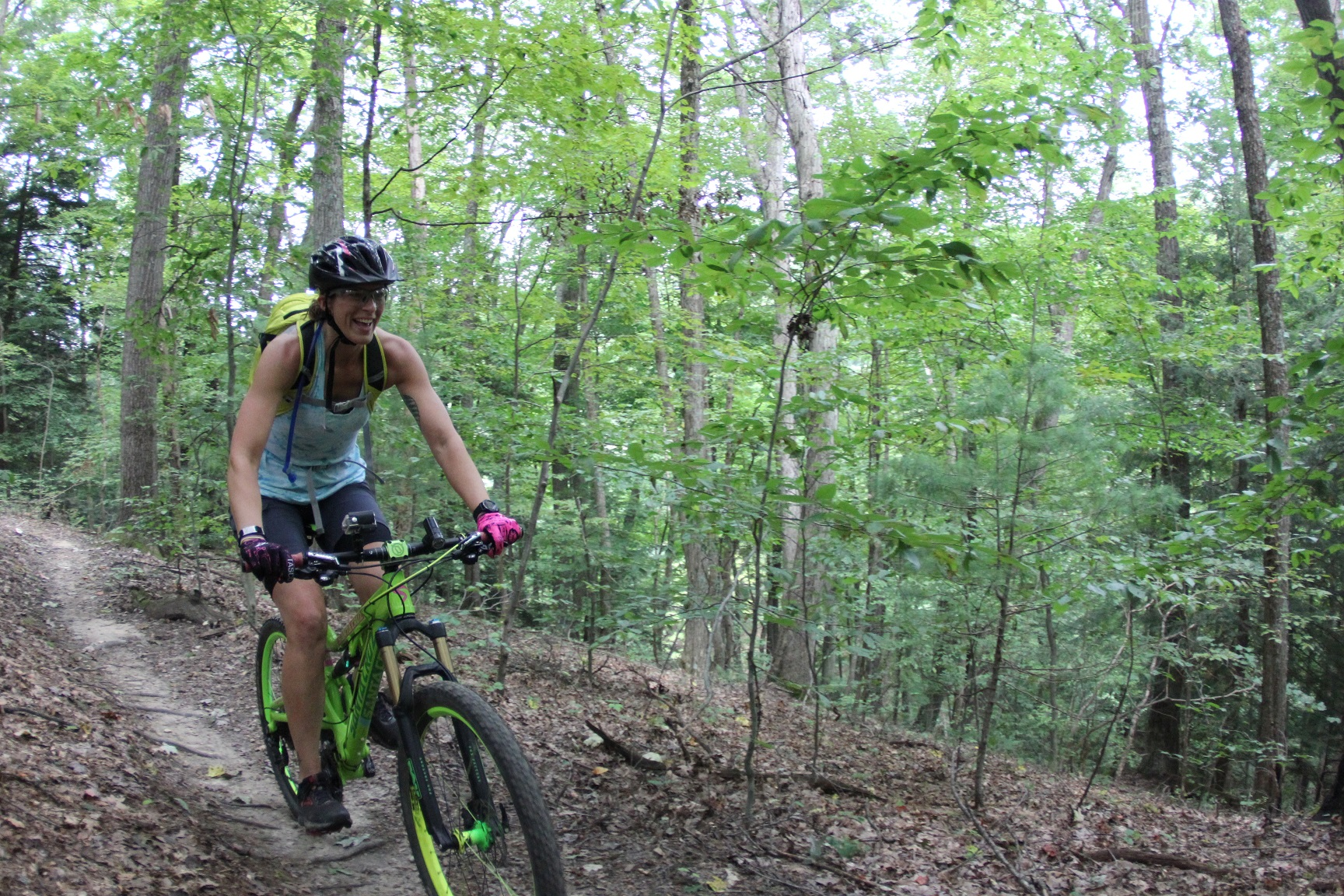
A cyclist rides a trail in Mohican State Park

An original 8.5-mile (13.7 km) mountain bike trail passed through Mohican State Park and the state forest was opened to the public in 2005. The trail was created through a partnership between the Mohican/Malabar Bike Club and ODNR. Since then, work has continued expanding the mountain bike trail to a 24.5 miles (39.4 km) loop that encircles the park. The trail is open to mountain bike riders and hikers. In 2022 several additional trails were added to the Mohican MTB trail system leading to a skills area near the Mohican Lodge. Each June the park is home to the Mohican MTB 100 race. The park offers trails of varying difficulty.

=== Naturalist programs ===
From Memorial Day Weekend through the Sunday of Labor Day Weekend, the park offers daily naturalist activities for its camping and cottage visitors as well as the general public. Activities include movies at the Class A Campground amphitheater on weekends, nature hikes, family games, and grist mill tours. In addition, the Junior Naturalist program is offered for kids from ages 7 through 14. A restored cabin served as the park Nature Center and was located in the Class A Campground. It was moved to the space where the game room used to reside.

=== Camping ===
In addition to the 10 remote "park and pack" single campsites, there are three separate camping areas at Mohican State Park: the Class A Campground, the Class B Campground, and the Group Camp Area. Several types of cabins are located near the Class A Campground. There is also the Mohican Resort and Conference Center, built in 1974 and operated by Xanterra Parks and Resorts.
