= Ohio State Route 96 =

State highway in northern Ohio, US

State Route 96

Route information
- Maintained by O.D.O.T.
- Length: 35.87 mi (57.73 km)
- Existed: 1923–present

Major junctions
- West end: SR 98 near Bucyrus
- East end: US 42 / US 250 in Ashland

Location
- Country: United States
- State: Ohio
- Counties: Crawford, Richland, Ashland

Highway system
- Ohio State Highway System; Interstate; US; State; Scenic
← SR 95	→ SR 97

State Route 96 (SR 96) is an east–west state highway in the northern portion of the U.S. state of Ohio. The southern terminus of SR 96 is at a T-intersection with SR 98 nearly 2 1/2 miles (4.0 km) northeast of Bucyrus. Its eastern terminus is at an interchange with US 42 and US 250 in the eastern portion of Ashland.

== Route description ==
SR 96 passes through the counties of Crawford, Richland and Ashland. There are no stretches of the highway that are included within the National Highway System, a system of highways identified as being most pertinent for the economy, mobility and defense of the nation.

== History ==
1923 marked the year in which SR 96 was established. Originally, the highway consisted of the majority of what its easternmost stretch today, running between downtown Shelby and downtown Ashland. A westward extension of SR 96 happened in 1939. This extension followed the existing SR 96 west out of Shelby, along with what is now Crawford County Road 45 (Stetzer Road) west-southwesterly to a new western terminus in the eastern end of Bucyrus at Old Lincoln Highway, which at the time designated as US 30N.

In 1971, coinciding with the completion of the US 30N (now mainline US 30) freeway bypass of Bucyrus, SR 96 was re-routed onto its present alignment through eastern Crawford County to its current western terminus at SR 98 northeast of Bucyrus. Jurisdiction of the former alignment into Bucyrus was turned back to Crawford County, which designated it as County Road 45. Then, by 1992, SR 96 was extended slightly on the eastern end. With the re-routing of US 250 onto a northern bypass of Ashland that tied with the US 42 eastern bypass of the city, SR 96 was extended into the eastern end of Ashland along the former routing of US 250 to a new eastern terminus where US 250 re-joined its former alignment at the US 42 interchange (now a signalized intersection).

== Major intersections ==
County	Location	mi	km	Destinations	Notes
Crawford	Liberty Township	0.00	0.00	SR 98 – Bucyrus, Plymouth	
Crawford	Liberty–Sandusky township line	3.66	5.89	SR 602 – North Robinson, New Washington	
Crawford	Vernon Township	8.39	13.50	SR 598 south – Galion	Western end of SR 598 concurrency
Crawford	Vernon Township	8.52	13.71	SR 598 north	Eastern end of SR 598 concurrency
Richland	Sharon Township	12.56	20.21	SR 39 west – Tiro	Western end of SR 39 concurrency
Richland	Shelby	14.85	23.90	SR 61 (Gamble Street)	
Richland	Shelby	15.13	24.35	SR 39 east (Mansfield Avenue) / South Broadway Avenue	Eastern end of SR 39 concurrency
Richland	Franklin Township	23.41	37.67	SR 13 south – Mansfield	Western end of SR 13 concurrency
Richland	Franklin Township	24.13	38.83	SR 13 north – Norwalk	Eastern end of SR 13 concurrency
Richland	Weller Township	27.91	44.92	SR 603 – Mifflin, Shiloh	
Richland	Weller Township	28.32	45.58	SR 545 – Mansfield, Savannah	
Ashland	Ashland	34.29	55.18	SR 60 north / SR 511 north (South Cottage Street) / West 2nd Street	Western end of SR 60 / SR 511 concurrency
Ashland	Ashland	34.48	55.49	SR 60 south / SR 511 south (Center Street)	Eastern end of SR 60 / SR 511 concurrency
Ashland	Ashland	35.87	57.73	US 42 / US 250 to I-71 – Norwalk, Medina, Mansfield, Wooster	
1.000 mi = 1.609 km; 1.000 km = 0.621 mi: Concurrency terminus
