= Ohio State Route 97 =

State highway in Ohio, US

State Route 97

Route information
- Maintained by ODOT
- Length: 34.57 mi (55.64 km)
- Existed: 1923–present

Major junctions
- West end: SR 19 / SR 61 / SR 309 in Galion
- US 42 in Lexington; I-71 near Bellville
- East end: SR 3 near Loudonville

Location
- Country: United States
- State: Ohio
- Counties: Ashland, Crawford, Morrow, Richland

Highway system
- Ohio State Highway System; Interstate; US; State; Scenic
← SR 96	→ SR 98

State Route 97 (SR 97) is a 34.57-mile (55.64 km) state route that runs between Galion and south of Loudonville in the US state of Ohio. Most of the route is a rural two-lane highway and passes through woodland, farmland and residential areas. For some of its path, SR 97 runs near the Clear Fork Mohican River. The highway was first signed in 1923 on a section of the current alignment. The route has been extended a few times; the first in 1926 extending the route to SR 3. The first section of road was paved in 1938. Another extension happened in 1939 with the route heading west to Galion. The final section paved was completed in the mid-1950s.

== Route description ==
SR 97 begins at the signalized intersection with SR 19, SR 61, and SR 309 in the city of Galion. SR 19 and SR 97 head concurrently to the east, as a two-lane highway passing through residential properties. The concurrency ends at a traffic signal, when SR 19 turns towards the south and SR 97 continues towards the east. SR 97 leaves Galion and makes a sharp curve heading towards the south, before another sharp curve towards the east-southeast. The highway passes through farmland and Blooming Grove, before having a T-intersection with the eastern terminus of SR 288. East of SR 288, the route curves towards the northeast, having an intersection with SR 314. After the intersection at SR 314, SR 97 turns towards the southeast and passes to the southwest of Clear Fork Reservoir. While paralleling the reservoir the highway enters Richland County. After the reservoir ends the highway enters Lexington. The highway passes through residential properties, before having a T-intersection with U.S. Route 42 (US 42).

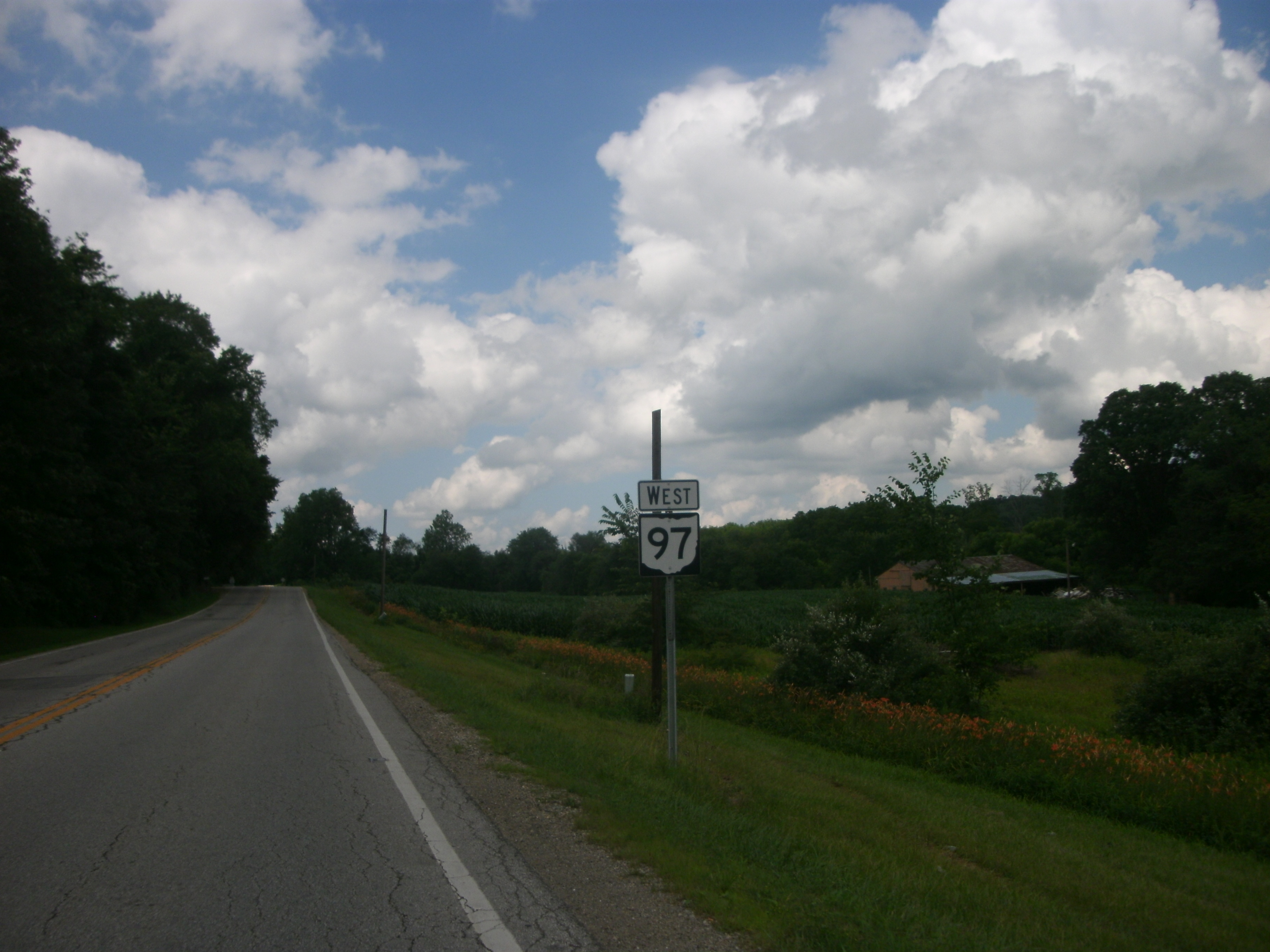
SR 97 west of Lexington

US 42 and SR 97 head east, having an intersection with the northern terminus of SR 546. After SR 546, the concurrency crosses the Clear Fork Mohican River and the road curves towards the northeast, passing through commercial properties. SR 97 turns towards the south leaving US 42. The route passes through commercial and industrial properties, before leaving Lexington. After Lexington the highway curves towards the southeast and passes through farmland. The highway enters Bellville and has an interchange with Interstate 71 (I–71). The route crosses over the Clear Fork Mohican River again, before curving due east, passing through residential properties. The route has a T-intersection with SR 13, this intersection is the southern terminus of the concurrency between the two routes. The two routes head north passing through downtown Bellville and crossing the Clear Fork Mohican River, before SR 97 turns towards the southeast leaving SR 13. The highway passes through commercial properties, before leaving Bellville.

East of Bellville SR 97 curves towards the east, passing through farmland and woodland. The route makes a sharp turn towards the south-southeast crossing the Clear Fork Mohican River for the final time. After crossing the river, SR 97 enters Butler and passes through residential properties, before beginning a concurrency with SR 95. The concurrency curves towards the east, before ending, with SR 95 heading due north and SR 97 continuing towards the east. The highway curves southeasterly, before leaving Butler. East of Butler the road curves towards the northeast, passing through woodland and farmland as a two-lane highway. The highway curves towards the east, before entering Ashland County. In Ashland County the route passes through the Mohican-Memorial State Forest and the Mohican State Park. The highway ends at an intersection with SR 3 in rural Hanover Township, Ashland County. Continuing east after SR 97 ends is Township Road 629. Only the section of SR 97 that is concurrent with SR 13 is incorporated within the National Highway System.

== History ==
SR 97 was first commissioned in 1923, between Lexington and Bellville. In 1926 the route was extended east to its current east terminus at SR 3. The entire route from Lexington to SR 3 was paved by 1938. The highway was extended west to Galion in 1939, with the road was paved between Galion and SR 545, current SR 288. The final section of SR 97, between SR 288 and Lexington, was paved between 1953 and 1955.

== Major intersections ==
County	Location	mi	km	Destinations	Notes
Crawford	Galion	0.00	0.00	SR 19 north / SR 61 / SR 309	Western terminus of SR 97; west end of SR 19 concurrency
Crawford	Galion	0.71	1.14	SR 19 south	Eastern end of SR 19 concurrency
Morrow	North Bloomfield Township	5.74	9.24	SR 288 west	Eastern terminus of SR 288
Morrow	Troy Township	7.40	11.91	SR 314	
Richland	Lexington	12.36	19.89	US 42 west	Western end of US 42 concurrency
Richland	Lexington	12.43	20.00	SR 546 south	Northern terminus of SR 546
Richland	Lexington	13.17	21.20	US 42 east	Eastern end of US 42 concurrency
Richland	Bellville	15.76	25.36	I-71 – Cleveland, Columbus	Exit 165 (I-71)
Richland	Bellville	18.84	30.32	SR 13 south	Southern end of SR 13 concurrency
Richland	Bellville	19.18	30.87	SR 13 north	Northern end of SR 13 concurrency
Richland	Butler	24.90	40.07	SR 95 west	Western end of SR 95 concurrency
Richland	Butler	25.08	40.36	SR 95 east	Eastern end of SR 95 concurrency
Ashland	Hanover Township	34.57	55.64	SR 3	Eastern terminus of SR 97
1.000 mi = 1.609 km; 1.000 km = 0.621 mi: Concurrency terminus
