= Ohio State Route 546 =

State highway in northern Ohio, US

State Route 546

Route information
- Maintained by ODOT
- Length: 11.43 mi (18.39 km)
- Existed: 1937–present

Major junctions
- South end: SR 13 near Fredericktown
- North end: US 42 / SR 97 in Lexington

Location
- Country: United States
- State: Ohio
- Counties: Knox, Richland

Highway system
- Ohio State Highway System; Interstate; US; State; Scenic
| ← SR 545 | → SR 547 |

State Route 546 (SR 546) is a north–south state highway in the northern portion of the U.S. state of Ohio. The southern terminus of SR 546 is at a T-intersection with SR 13 nearly two and a half miles (4.0 km) north of Fredericktown. Its northern terminus is at a signalized intersection with the U.S. Route 42 (US 42)/SR 97 concurrency in Lexington.

Established in the late 1930s, SR 546 is a two-lane highway that traverses through northwestern Knox County and southwestern Richland County. For most of its length, the highway passes through primarily rural terrain featuring a mix of forest and farmland.

== Route description ==
SR 546's path takes it through northwestern Knox County and southwestern Richland County. This highway is not a part of the National Highway System, a network of routes deemed most important for the economy, mobility and defense of the nation.

The highway begins at a T-intersection with SR 13 at a point approximately two and a half miles (4.0 km) north of Fredericktown in Middlebury Township. The majority of SR 546 passes through rural terrain, traveling amid vast farmland with a number of homes and the occasional patch of trees appearing alongside the highway. SR 546 departs from SR 13 heading to the northwest, passing its intersection with Yankee Street (County Road 55) before turning north at the Shafer Road intersection. It then crosses Gregg Road before meeting Leedy Road, where the highway crosses into Richland County.

SR 546 continues amid farm country as it enters into Jefferson Township. The highway arcs to the northwest, and passes intersections with Painter Road and Bangorville Road, after which it traverses a more forested terrain for a brief distance before it becomes a blend of woods and open space. SR 546 continues northwesterly as it crosses Clever Road, and passes into Perty Township. It is abutted by a row of houses as it approaches the Black Road T-intersection. and then crosses Darlington East Road. The houses then spread out more as a wooded landscape takes shape as SR 546 approaches the point where Interstate 71 (I-71) goes over the state highway without a direct connection between the two. SR 546 meets Steele Road immediately prior to crossing underneath the Interstate, and then Woodberry Road just after doing so. A balance of woods and farmland appears alongside the state route northwest of I-71, as it passes Coursen Road. After turning to the north, it meets the western leg of Bellville-Jonesville Road, crosses over the Clear Fork of the Mohican River, and then passes by the eastern leg of Bellville-Jonesville Road, immediately followed by Baughman Road. Bending to the north-northwest, SR 546 next meets Mock Road, then curves back to the north prior to intersecting Eckert Road.

Upon crossing Eckert Road, SR 546 enters Troy Township. The highway next bends to the northeast, and amidst the continued blend of woods and farmland with the occasional house, crosses the Kings Corners Road intersection. As the highway turns to the north and then northeast, a series of dead-end side streets begin to appear, while still amid rural terrain. When SR 546 arcs back to the north, it then crosses into the village of Lexington. Now known as Frederick Street, the state highway passes into a primarily residential area. It intersects Clever Lane, which connects the highway to Lexington High School just two blocks to the west. Continuing north, SR 546 goes by Central Elementary School and Lexington Middle School. After crossing a side street, Church Street, the state highway passes by a couple of businesses prior to coming to an end at a signalized intersection where it meets US 42 and SR 97. Proceeding north from this intersection is Plymouth Street, which becomes county-maintained Lexington-Springmill Road once the roadway departs the village limits.

== History ==
The SR 546 designation took place in 1937. It has always been routed along its present-day alignment between SR 13 north of Fredericktown and US 42 in Lexington. No changes of major significance have taken place to this state highway's routing since it was established.

== Major intersections ==
| County | Location | mi | km | Destinations | Notes |
|---|---|---|---|---|---|
| Knox | Middlebury Township | 0.00 | 0.00 | SR 13 | |
| Richland | Lexington | 11.43 | 18.39 | US 42 / SR 97 (Main Street) / Plymouth Street | |
1.000 mi = 1.609 km; 1.000 km = 0.621 mi
