= Ohio State Route 309 =

State highway in central Ohio, US

State Route 309

Route information
- Maintained by ODOT
- Length: 103.579 mi (166.694 km)
- Existed: 1973–present

Major junctions
- West end: US 30 near Delphos
- I-75 near Lima; US 68 / SR 67 in Kenton; US 23 near Marion
- East end: US 30 in Mansfield

Location
- Country: United States
- State: Ohio
- Counties: Allen, Hardin, Marion, Morrow, Crawford, Richland

Highway system
- Ohio State Highway System; Interstate; US; State; Scenic
← SR 308	→ SR 310
← SR 30	US 30S	→ SR 31

State Route 309 (SR 309) is an east–west highway in central Ohio. Its western terminus is at its interchange with U.S. Route 30 (US 30) near Delphos, and its eastern terminus is at its interchange with US 30 in Mansfield. Its current route takes it through the cities of Lima, Kenton, Marion, Galion, and Ontario; as well as the villages of Elida and Caledonia.

== Route description ==
Within the city of Lima, SR 309 is officially designated along SR 81 (North Street) from Jameson Avenue to Union Street, south along Union Street (concurrent with SR 65, and east along Elm Street (SR 117). The eastbound direction of SR 309 is signed south along Jameson Street to SR 117, then east along it while the westbound direction is signed along Central Avenue and Front Street.

In the city of Ontario, SR 309 becomes a four-lane divided highway shortly before a partial interchange with the western terminus of SR 430; all movements are provided by ramps, with the exception of westbound SR 309 to eastbound SR 430, which is accomplished by making a U-turn via a crossroad between the opposing lanes of SR 309. Next, there is a partial interchange providing access to and from Beer Road on the westbound side only of SR 309; westbound SR 309 narrows to a single lane through this junction and widens again beyond it. Following are intersections with Stumbo Road and with Lexington–Springmill Road. Next is a partial cloverleaf interchange at 4th Street. At the Ontario–Mansfield border, Home Road crosses the highway on an overpass. Just after comes the eastern terminus of SR 309 at a partial interchange with US 30; the only movements available are eastbound SR 309 to eastbound US 30, and westbound US 30 to westbound SR 309.

== History ==
U.S. Route 30S
- Location: Delphos-Mansfield, Ohio
- Existed: 1920s–1973

The current alignment of SR 309 follows the original alignment of US 30, established in 1925. In 1931, plans were made to reroute the section of US 30 between Delphos and Mansfield onto the original State Route 5, a more direct east–west route. To satisfy the concerns of business owners along the original route worried about the diversion of traffic and loss of business, divided routes were created with the original route designated as U.S. Route 30S and the new route as U.S. Route 30N.

The original western split of US 30S and US 30N was in downtown Delphos at the current intersection of Main Street and Fifth Street, while the eastern split was in eastern Mansfield at the current intersection of US 42 (Ashland Road) and Park Avenue East. By 1961, new highway construction resulted in both ends being moved. The realignment of US 30 to the northern parts of Mansfield and Ontario moved the eastern split to the current junction of SR 309 and US 30 in western Mansfield. The original eastern end of US 30S, along with the part of the original US 30 between Mansfield and Mifflin, was redesignated as State Route 430. In Delphos, the western 30N–30S split was moved to the intersection of Elida Road and Lincoln Highway, then east of the city limits, after a new section of Elida Road was built and US 30S routed onto it. The part of US 30S that ran along Elida Avenue and East Second Street was decommissioned.

In November 1973, US 30N became the mainline of US 30 and US 30S was redesignated as SR 309. The only significant change of the route since this certification is its western terminus. The original western terminus was where Elida Road (SR 309) met East Fifth Street and Lincoln Highway (US 30). As part of a new bypass completed in 1981 that routed US 30 around Delphos, SR 309's western terminus was moved to a new interchange with US 30 just east of the Delphos city limits.

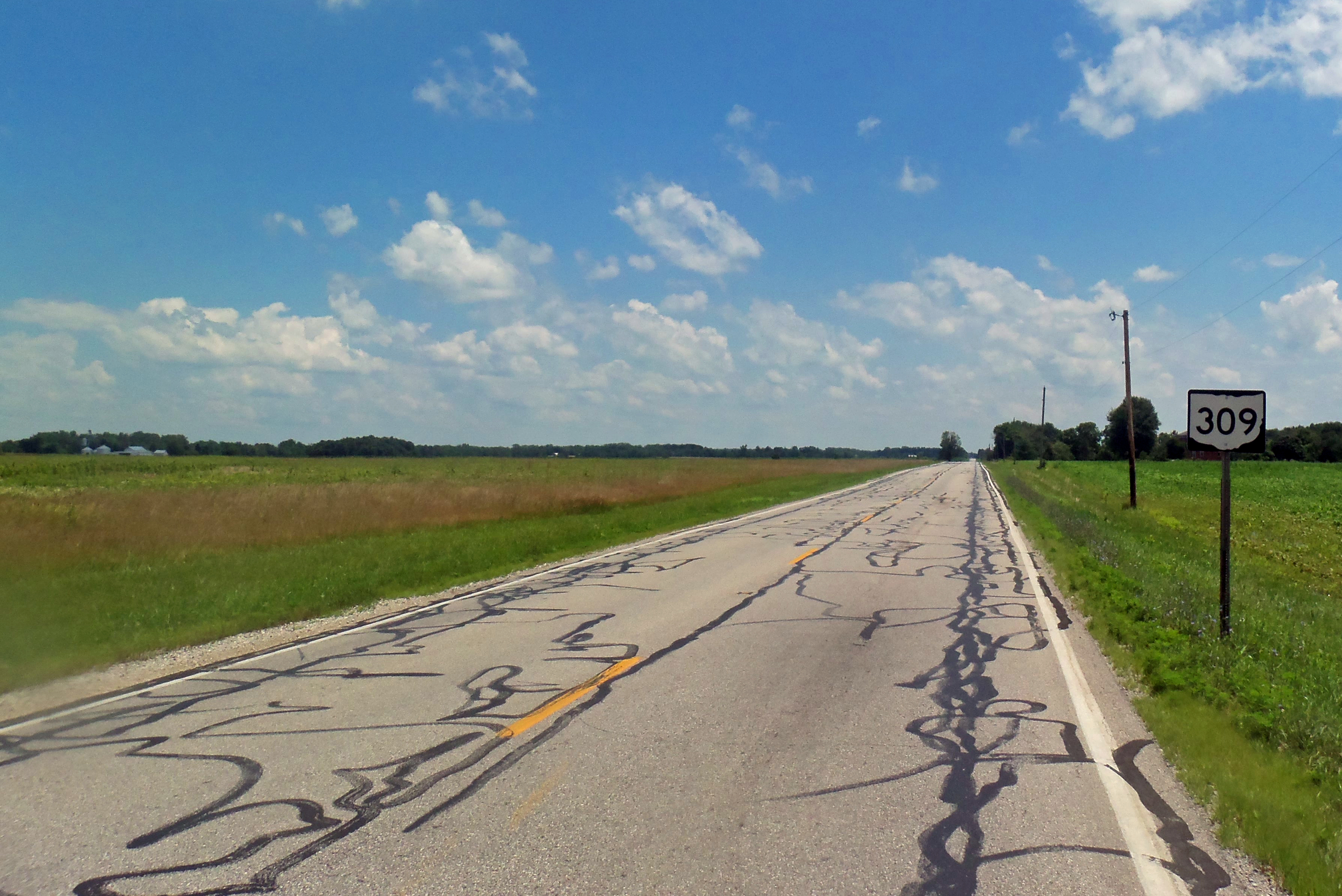
Route 309 between Marion and Kenton

Prior the current route, the SR 309 designation was used on what is now State Route 541. It was replaced with the now defunct State Route 271 in 1935.

=== Harding Highway ===
The Lincoln Highway left the present State Route 309, a better-quality road at the time, in favor of the direct Delphos–Mansfield route now generally followed by US 30. Only two weeks after the official route was announced in September 1913, it had already been redefined to a straighter path between Lima and Galion; the rest of the straightening came later. The towns along the route got together and formed the Harding Highway, named after President Warren G. Harding, who had grown up in the area.

This Harding Highway continued east via the Lincoln Highway to Canton, turning southeast from there to Steubenville via State Route 43. To the west, it was marked along the Lincoln Highway to Van Wert, heading west along the present U.S. Route 224, roughly State Road 114, State Road 10, State Road 8, and State Road 2 through Indiana to the Illinois state line.

== Future ==
There is a $4.1 million project in eastern Allen County to replace the current intersections at Thayer and Napoleon roads with roundabouts. The project began in April 2022 and is expected to be complete in November.

== Major intersections ==
County	Location	mi	km	Destinations	Notes
Allen	Marion Township	0.000– 0.546	0.000– 0.879	US 30 west – Van Wert, Fort Wayne	Interchange; eastbound US 30 exit / westbound US 30 entrance only; western terminus of SR 309
Allen	Lima	11.798	18.987	SR 81 (West North Street)	Western terminus of SR 81 concurrency (westbound only); western end of SR 309 one-way pair
Allen	Lima	12.167	19.581	SR 117 west (West Elm Street) / South Jameson Avenue	Western end of SR 117 concurrency (eastbound only)
Allen	Lima	13.044	20.992	SR 65 south (South West Street)	Western end of southbound SR 65 concurrency (eastbound only)
Allen	Lima	13.339	21.467	SR 65 north (South Central Avenue)	Western end of SR 65 northbound concurrency; eastern end of SR 309 one-way pair
Allen	Lima	13.557	21.818	SR 65 south (South Pine Street)	Eastern end of SR 65 concurrency
Allen	Lima	14.916– 15.023	24.005– 24.177	I-75 – Dayton, Toledo	Exit 125 (I-75)
Allen	Bath–Perry township line	15.209	24.477	SR 117 east / Willard Avenue – Bellefontaine, Airport	Eastern end of SR 117 concurrency
Allen	Bath–Perry township line	18.190	29.274	Thayer Road	Intersection; scheduled for conversion to roundabout November 2022
Allen	Auglaize–Jackson township line	22.333	35.941	Napoleon Road	Intersection; scheduled for conversion to roundabout November 2022
Hardin	Liberty–Marion township line	27.205	43.782	SR 235 south / Klinger Road – Alger	Eastern end of SR 235 concurrency
Hardin	Liberty–Marion township line	28.209	45.398	SR 235 north / CR 45 – Ada, Ohio Northern University	Western end of SR 235 concurrency
Hardin	Marion Township	29.560	47.572	SR 701 east	Western terminus SR 701
Hardin	Marion Township	30.334	48.818	SR 195 south / CR 65 – McGuffey	Northern terminus of SR 195
Hardin	Kenton	41.165	66.249	US 68 / SR 67 (Detroit Street) – Bellefontaine, Findlay	
Hardin	Kenton	41.232	66.356	SR 31 / SR 53 (Main Street)	
Marion	Grand–Montgomery township line	53.191	85.603	SR 37 – La Rue, Richwood	
Marion	Big Island Township	62.521	100.618	SR 203 south / Prospect Upper Sandusky Road N – Prospect	Northern terminus of SR 203
Marion	Marion	66.941	107.731	SR 95 west (West Center Street / Kenton Avenue)	Western end of SR 95 concurrency
Marion	Marion	68.088	109.577	SR 4 south / SR 423 south / SR 739 south (South Prospect Street)	SR 4 / SR 423 / SR 739 on a one-way pair; northern terminus of SR 739 (at Center Street)
Marion	Marion	68.248	109.835	SR 4 north / SR 423 north / SR 739 north (South State Street)	SR 4 / SR 423 / SR 739 on a one-way pair; northern terminus of SR 739 (at Center Street)
Marion	Marion	68.395	110.071	SR 95 east (Mouth Vernon Avenue) to South Vine Street / US 23 – Harding Home	Eastern end of SR 95 concurrency
Marion	Marion Township	70.672– 70.788	113.736– 113.922	US 23 – Delaware, Upper Sandusky	Interchange
Marion	Claridon Township	73.915	118.955	SR 98 / Marion Williamsport Road – Bucyrus, Waldo	
Marion	Claridon Township	77.453	124.649	SR 746 south (Whetstone River Road) / South Water Street	Northern terminus of SR 746
Morrow	No major junctions				
Marion	Tully Township	83.674	134.660	SR 100 north (Ibera-Bucyrus Road) – Bucyrus	Southern terminus of SR 100
Morrow	Washington Township	85.911	138.260	SR 288 east – Mt. Gilead, Lexington	Western terminus of SR 288
Morrow	Washington Township	86.163	138.666	SR 61 south – Mt. Gilead	Southern end of SR 61 concurrency
Crawford	Galion	89.860	144.616	SR 19 west (Harding Way) / SR 598 north (Portland Way)	Western end of SR 19 concurrency; southern terminus of SR 598
Crawford	Galion	91.130	146.660	SR 19 east / SR 97 east (Harding Way) / South East Street	Eastern end of SR 19 concurrency; western terminus of SR 97
Crawford	Galion	93.229	150.038	SR 61 north to US 30 – Crestline	Northern end of SR 61 concurrency
Richland	Springfield Township	97.180	156.396	SR 181 west – Crestline	Eastern terminus of SR 181
Richland	Ontario	98.186	158.015	SR 314 – Chesterville, Shelby	
Richland	Ontario	100.571– 100.821	161.853– 162.256	SR 430 east	Interchange; westbound SR 309 to eastbound SR 430 via U-turn; western terminus of SR 430
Richland	Ontario			Beer Road	Interchange; westbound SR 309 only
Richland	Ontario	102.104– 102.660	164.320– 165.215	West Fourth Street	Partial cloverleaf interchange
Richland	Mansfield	103.579	166.694	US 30 east – Mansfield, Wooster	Interchange; eastbound US 30 entrance / westbound US 30 exit only; eastern terminus of SR 309
1.000 mi = 1.609 km; 1.000 km = 0.621 mi: Concurrency terminus; Incomplete access
