= Ohio State Route 61 =

State highway in northern Ohio, US

State Route 61
- Route of SR 61 highlighted in red

Route information
- Maintained by ODOT
- Length: 91.16 mi (146.71 km)
- Existed: 1924–present

Major junctions
- South end: US 36 / SR 3 in Sunbury
- I-71 near Marengo; US 42 in Mount Gilead; US 30 near Galion; US 224 in New Haven; US 250 / SR 13 in Norwalk; SR 2 near Huron
- North end: US 6 near Huron

Location
- Country: United States
- State: Ohio
- Counties: Delaware, Morrow, Crawford, Richland, Huron, Erie

Highway system
- Ohio State Highway System; Interstate; US; State; Scenic
← SR 60	→ US 62

State Route 61 (SR 61) is a north–south state highway in the northern portion of the U.S. state of Ohio. Its southern terminus is at the U.S. Route 36/State Route 3 concurrency in Sunbury, and its northern terminus is at U.S. Route 6 east of Huron, at the southernmost point of Lake Erie (which is subsequently the southernmost northern border of the United States). State Route 61 is routed through the communities of Mount Gilead, Galion, Crestline, Shelby, Plymouth, Norwalk, and Berlin Heights.

== Major junctions ==
County	Location	mi	km	Destinations	Notes
Delaware	Sunbury	0.00	0.00	US 36 west / SR 37 (Cherry Street) to I-71 / SR 3 south (State Street) – Delaware	Southern end of US 36 / SR 3 concurrency
Delaware	Berkshire Township	0.43	0.69	US 36 east / SR 3 north / Columbus Street – Mount Vernon	Northern end of US 36 / SR 3 concurrency
Delaware	Kingston Township	4.77	7.68	SR 656 north / Wilson Road	Southern terminus of SR 656
Delaware	Kingston Township	5.45	8.77	SR 521 – Delaware, Olive Green	
Morrow	Bennington Township	9.18– 9.36	14.77– 15.06	I-71 – Cleveland, Columbus	Exit 140 (I-71)
Morrow	Bennington Township	11.11	17.88	SR 229 – Ashley, Marengo, Mount Vernon	
Morrow	Lincoln Township	16.68	26.84	SR 529 west / CR 23 – Cardington	Eastern terminus of SR 529
Morrow	Gilead Township	21.01	33.81	US 42 south – Delaware	Southern end of US 42 concurrency
Morrow	Mount Gilead	21.61	34.78	SR 95A (Marion Street)	
Morrow	Mount Gilead	21.74	34.99	SR 95 (High Street)	
Morrow	Mount Gilead	21.97	35.36	US 42 north (Union Street) – Mansfield	Northern end of US 42 concurrency
Morrow	Washington Township	30.70	49.41	SR 288 – Marion, Lexington	
Morrow	Washington Township	31.01	49.91	SR 309 west – Marion	Southern end of SR 309 concurrency
Crawford	Galion	34.71	55.86	SR 19 west (Harding Way) / SR 598 north (Portland Way)	Western end of SR 19 concurrency; southern terminus of SR 598
Crawford	Galion	35.98	57.90	SR 19 east / SR 97 east (Harding Way) / East Street	Eastern end of SR 19 concurrency; western terminus of SR 97
Crawford	Galion	38.08	61.28	SR 309 east – Ontario	Northern end of SR 309 concurrency
Crawford	Galion–Crestline municipal line	39.20– 39.34	63.09– 63.31	US 30 – Mansfield, Bucyrus	Interchange
Crawford	Crestline	41.32	66.50	SR 181 east (Main Street) / Seltzer Street	Western terminus of SR 181
Richland	Sharon Township	49.01	78.87	SR 314 south – Chesterville	Northern terminus of SR 314
Richland	Shelby	51.17	82.35	SR 39 / SR 96 (West Main Street)	
Richland	Plymouth	58.72	94.50	SR 98 south (Bucyrus Street)	Southern end of SR 98 concurrency
Richland–Huron county line	Plymouth	59.25	95.35	SR 98 ends / SR 603 south (Baseline Road)	Northern end of SR 98 concurrency; northern terminus of SR 603
Huron	New Haven Township	61.77	99.41	SR 598 south	Southern end of SR 598 concurrency
Huron	New Haven Township	61.90	99.62	US 224 – Greenwich, Tiffin	
Huron	New Haven Township	62.16	100.04	SR 598 north / North Street	Northern end of SR 598 concurrency
Huron	New Haven Township	63.74	102.58	SR 103 west / Boughtonville Road – Willard	Eastern terminus of SR 103
Huron	Greenfield Township	67.39	108.45	SR 162 – Steuben, North Fairfield	
Huron	Norwalk	76.70	123.44	SR 61C to US 20 west / SR 18 west – Toledo	Eastern terminus of unsigned SR 61C
Huron	Norwalk	78.04	125.59	US 250 / SR 13 (Whittlesey Avenue)	
Huron	Norwalk Township	81.21	130.69	SR 601 – Milan	
Erie	Berlin Township	84.91	136.65	SR 113 west – Milan	Southern end of SR 113 concurrency
Erie	Berlin Heights–Berlin Township municipal line	86.09	138.55	SR 113 east / CR 58 (Ceylon Road) – Elyria	Northern end of SR 113 concurrency
Erie	Berlin Township	90.38– 90.51	145.45– 145.66	SR 2 – Cleveland, Toledo	Interchange
Erie	Berlin Township	91.16	146.71	US 6 / LECT – Huron, Vermilion	
1.000 mi = 1.609 km; 1.000 km = 0.621 mi: Concurrency terminus

== SR 61C ==
State Route 61C (SR 61C) is a 0.72-mile-long (1.16 km) connection between the Norwalk Bypass US 20/SR 18 and SR 61 southwest of Norwalk. The intersection forms a sideways triangle with SR 61 as the base on the east, US 20 as the south side, and Route 61C as the north side. SR 61C exists because US 20 bridges SR 61 on the south side of the triangle and would have not intersected SR 61 otherwise. SR 61C is part of a former alignment of US 20.
