= Brownella Cottage and Grace Episcopal Church and Rectory =

Historic house in Ohio, United States

- U.S. National Register of Historic Places
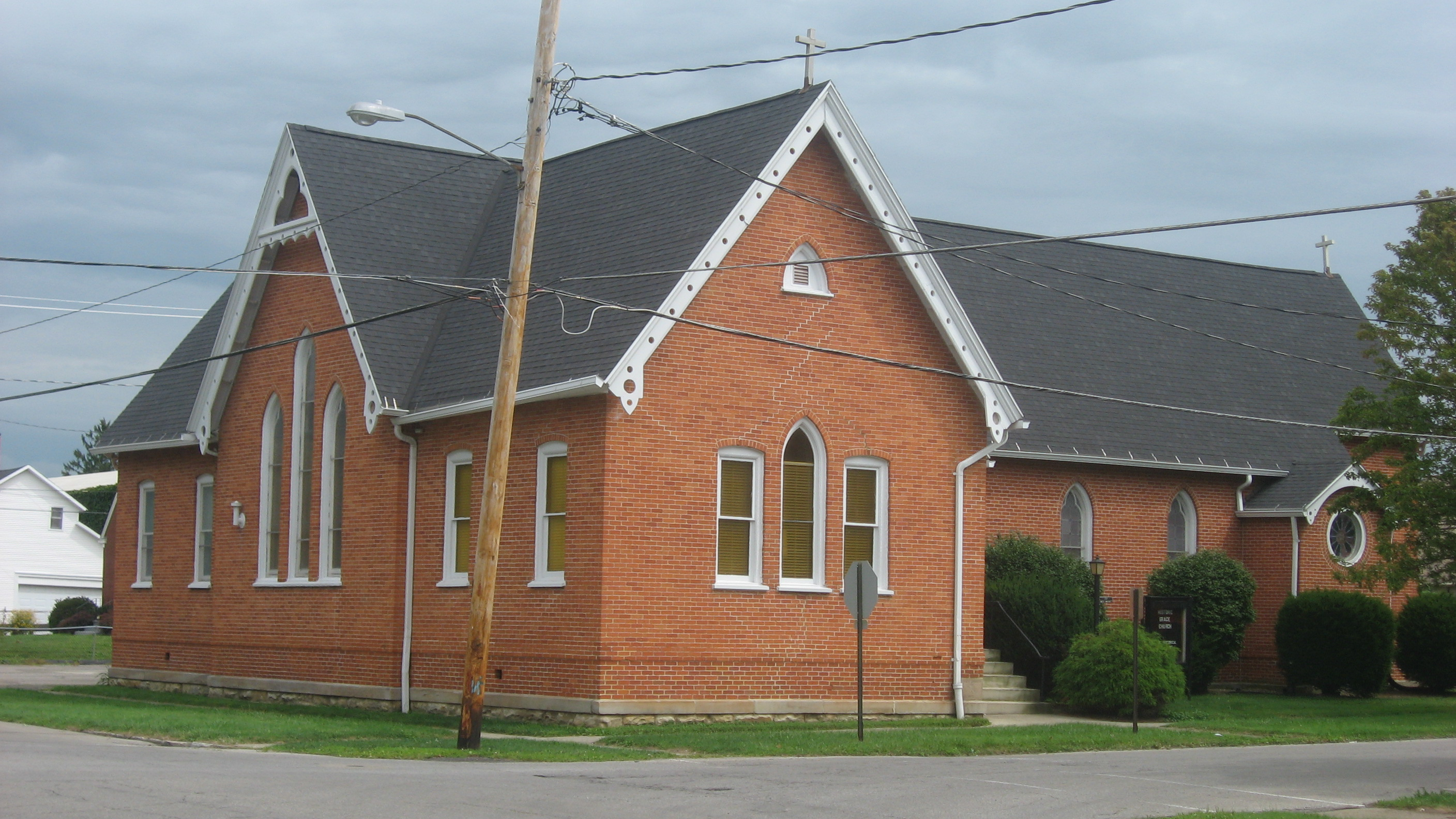
- Grace Church

- Location within Ohio Location within the United States
- Location: S. Union and Walnut Sts., Galion, Ohio
- Coordinates: 40°43′59″N 82°47′28″W
- Area: 2 acres (0.81 ha)
- Built: 1866
- Architectural style: Queen Anne, Gothic Revival
- NRHP reference No.: 80002975
- Added to NRHP: September 27, 1980

Brownella Cottage and Grace Episcopal Church and Rectory (also known as Bishop Brown House and the Grace Episcopal Church and Education Building) is a historic church complex at S. Union and Walnut Streets in Galion, Ohio.

The site is significant for its association with Bishop William Montgomery Brown, notable as the first bishop of his communion (Note: The Ohio Historic Places Dictionary's very brief summary about the site mentions the Protestant Episcopal Church without being clear what denomination or communion is meant; the William Montgomery Brown article suggests he was deposed from the Episcopal Church (United States).) to be tried for heresy since the Reformation and "'the first of any creed in America to be deposed for heretical teaching'" (according to an obituary).

== Description ==
The complex includes:

- the Brownella Cottage, built during 1885-1887 for Brown and his wife, Ella Scranton Bradford, which was the bishop's home until his death in 1937,
- the bishop's study, formerly St. Joseph's Roman Catholic Church, (Note: The wording of the brief summary is unclear whether this study is the Brownella Cottage or a different building.)
- the Brownella carriage house,
- Grace Episcopal Church, and
- the rectory of the Grace Episcopal Church.

The cottage at least was funded by Cleveland philanthropist Mary Scranton Bradford, "reflecting the Bradford wealth and high style of the 1880s architecture in the United States."

Some part of the complex was built in 1866.

The complex was added to the National Register in 1980.

The buildings are now owned by the Galion Historical Society. The 1887 Brownella Cottage features its original furnishings and is open for tours. The church is located across the street from the cottage and is available for events.

== See also ==
- William Montgomery Brown#Brownella Cottage
