= Ohio State Route 288 =

State highway in Morrow County, Ohio, US

State Route 288

Route information
- Maintained by ODOT
- Length: 6.82 mi (10.98 km)
- Existed: 1953–present

Major junctions
- West end: SR 309 near Galion
- East end: SR 97 near Lexington

Location
- Country: United States
- State: Ohio
- Counties: Morrow

Highway system
- Ohio State Highway System; Interstate; US; State; Scenic
| ← SR 287 | → SR 289 |

State Route 288 (SR 288) is a 6.82 mi (10.98 km) long east–west state highway in the northern portion of the U.S. state of Ohio. The western terminus of SR 288 is at a T-intersection with SR 309 about 3 miles (4.8 km) southwest of Galion. Its eastern terminus is also at a T-intersection, this time with SR 97 approximately 5.50 miles (8.85 km) northwest of Lexington.

== Route description ==
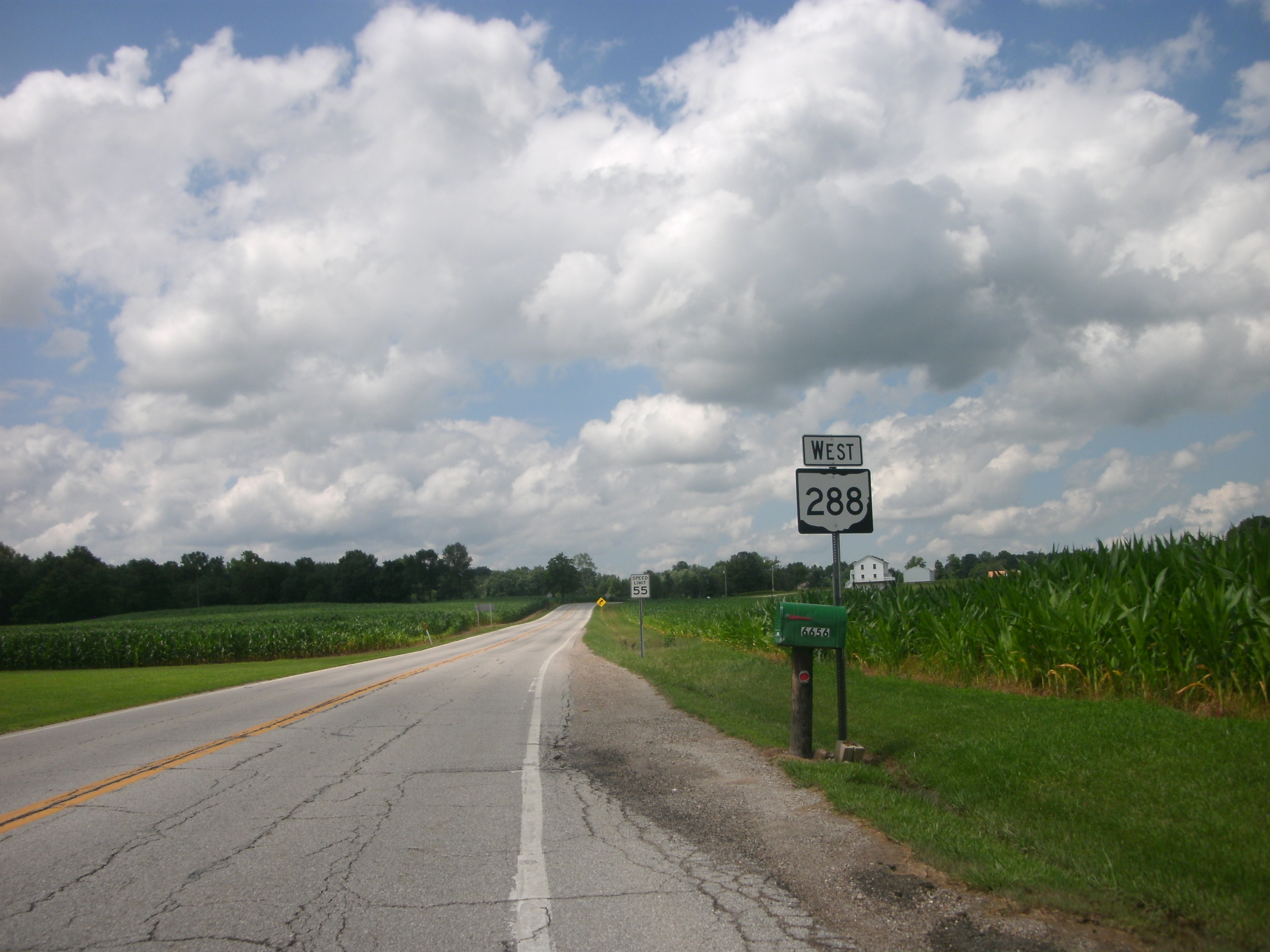
SR 288 just west of SR 97 in North Bloomfield Township

SR 288 runs exclusively through the rural northern portion of Morrow County. The route begins at a T-intersection with SR 309 in Washington Township. It heads a short distance east and immediately intersects SR 61. SR 288 curves to the east-northeast just past this junction, bounded by farmland on the south side and woods on the north side. A few homes soon begin to appear alongside the roadway, as the land on the north side opens up prior to SR 288's crossing of the CSX railway. The highway soon crosses into North Bloomfield Township, where the rural setting features occasional patches of woods and a few homes amidst the predominant farmlands. SR 288 passes through successive intersections with Atkinson Road (County Road 38, CR 38) and West Point–Galion Road (CR 40) prior to its junction with SR 19. Continuing to the east-northeast, SR 288 crosses Clase Road (Township Road 236, TR 236), Williamsport–Crestline Road (CR 46), North Bloomfield Road (TR 48), Williamsport–Williamsburg Road (CR 20) and Meadowcreek Place (TR 249). SR 288 comes to an end as it arrives as the T-intersection it has with SR 97.

No part of this highway is included within the National Highway System.

== History ==
The SR 288 designation was applied in 1953. This route has utilized the same alignment through northern Morrow County since it was first established.

An earlier SR 288 designation became SR 640 in 1941.

== Major intersections ==
The entire route is in Morrow County.

| Location | mi | km | Destinations | Notes |
|---|---|---|---|---|
| Washington Township | 0.00 | 0.00 | SR 309 – Marion, Galion | |
| Washington Township | 0.10 | 0.16 | SR 61 – Mount Gilead | |
| North Bloomfield Township | 3.06 | 4.92 | SR 19 | |
| North Bloomfield Township | 6.82 | 10.98 | SR 97 – Galion, Lexington | |
1.000 mi = 1.609 km; 1.000 km = 0.621 mi
