= Galion City School District =

School district in Ohio

Coordinates: 28°52′N 17°21′W

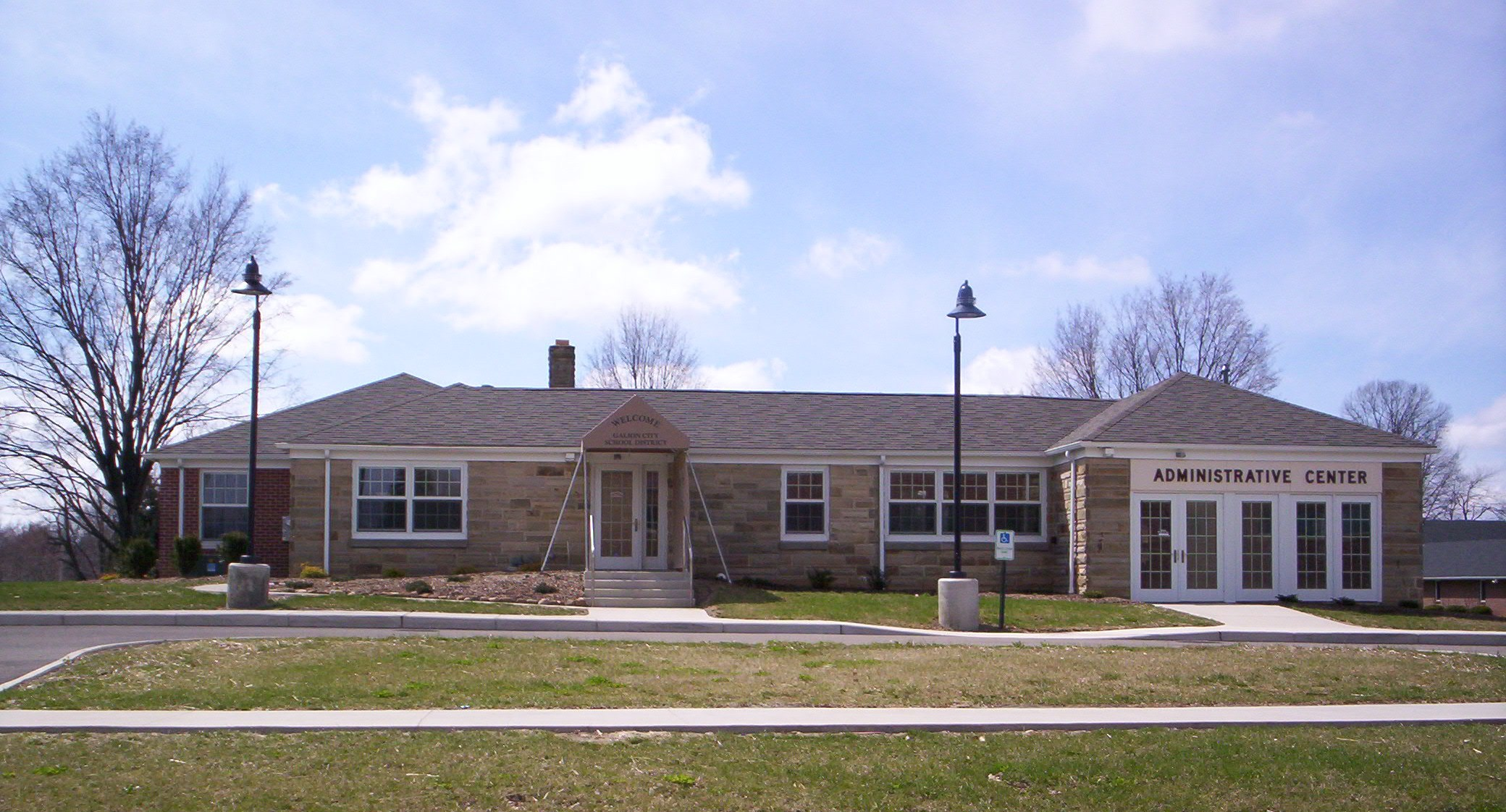
Galion City School District Administrative Center

Galion City School District is a public school district (number 1705) serving students in the city of Galion, Ohio, United States. The school district enrolls 2,193 students as of the 2008–2009 academic year.

== Schools ==
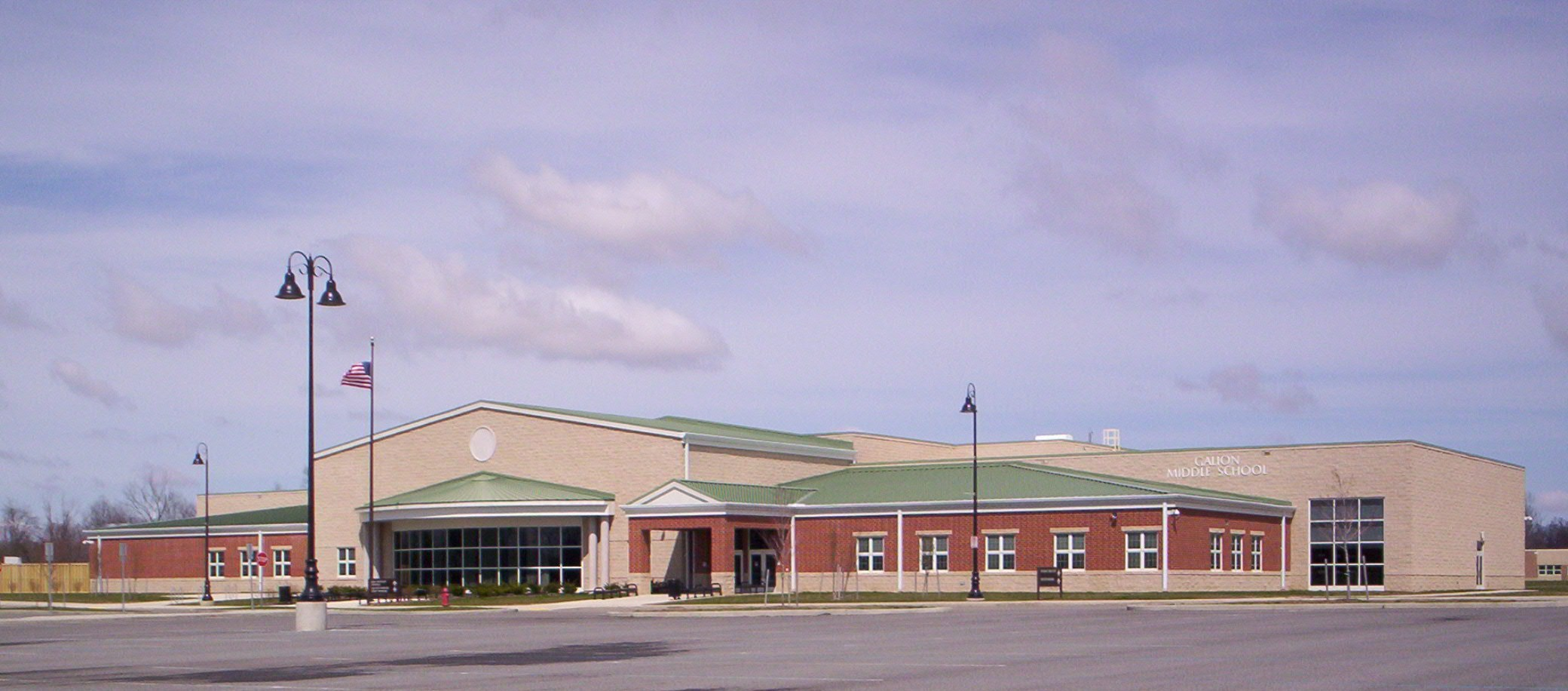
A view of the new Galion Middle School.

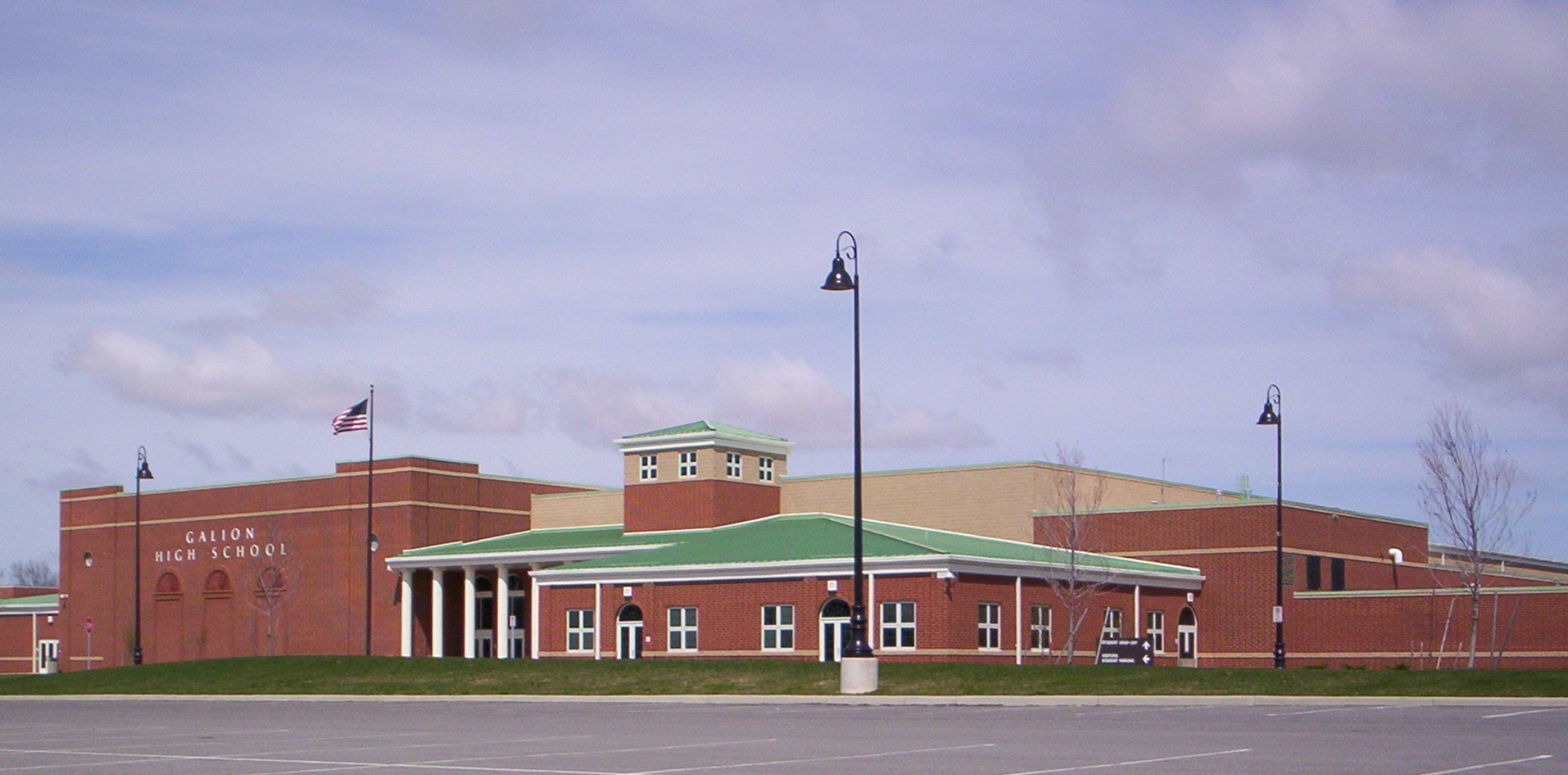
A view of the new Galion High School.

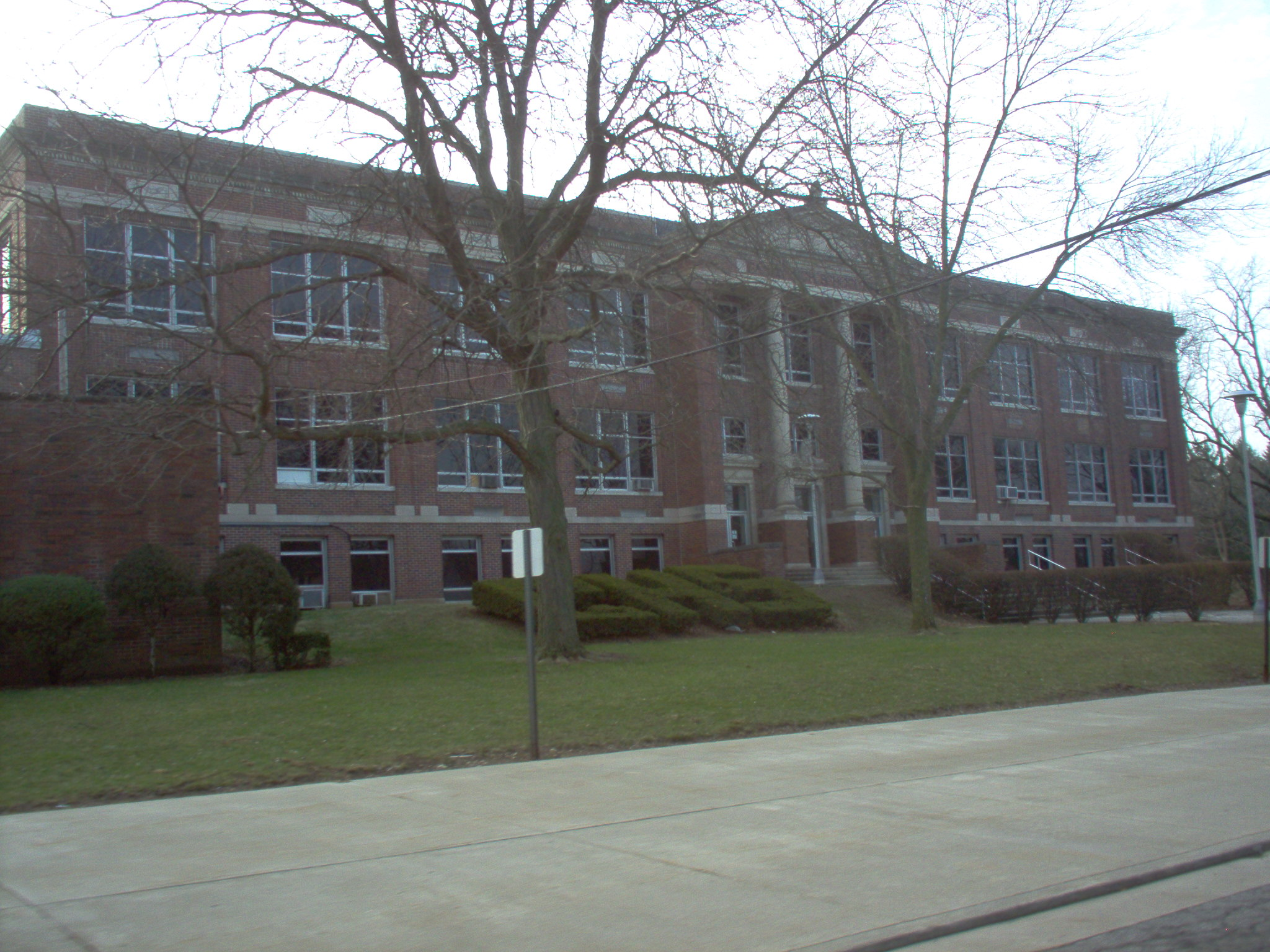
The original Galion High School as it appeared in 2007. It was replaced with a new school in 2007–2008 school year, and the old building has been demolished.

=== Elementary schools ===
- Dawsett Elementary School (Grades K through 3rd) (Demolished in 2008)
- North Elementary School (Grades K through 3rd) (Demolished in 2008)
- Renschville Elementary School (Grades 4th and 5th) (Demolished in 2008)
- Galion Primary School (Grades Pre-K through 2nd)
- Galion Intermediate School (Grades 3rd through 5th)

=== Middle schools ===
- Galion Middle School (Grades 6th through 8th)

=== High schools ===
- Galion High School (Grades 9th through 13th)
