= Ohio State Route 98 =

State highway in northern Ohio, US

State Route 98

Route information
- Maintained by ODOT
- Length: 46.18 mi (74.32 km)
- Existed: 1923–present

Major junctions
- South end: SR 47 / SR 423 in Waldo
- US 23 in Waldo; US 30 in Bucyrus
- North end: SR 61 in Plymouth

Location
- Country: United States
- State: Ohio
- Counties: Marion, Crawford, Richland

Highway system
- Ohio State Highway System; Interstate; US; State; Scenic
← SR 97	→ SR 99

State Route 98 (SR 98) is a north–south state highway in the northern portion of the U.S. state of Ohio. Its southern terminus is at the SR 47/SR 423 concurrency in Waldo, and its northern terminus is at SR 61 in Plymouth.

SR 98 is known as Columbus-Sandusky Road along its stretch between Waldo and Bucyrus, as well as Bucyrus Street in Plymouth. This stretch of SR 98, in combination with US 23 south of Waldo, and SR 4 north of Bucyrus, comprises the most direct route between Columbus and Sandusky.

== History ==
SR 98 was commissioned in 1923 on the same alignment as today. The entire route was paved by 1933.

== Major intersections ==
County	Location	mi	km	Destinations	Notes
Marion	Waldo	0.00	0.00	SR 47 west / SR 423 north	Southern terminus of SR 98; eastern terminus of SR 47; southern terminus of SR 423
Marion	Waldo	0.12	0.19	US 23	
Marion	Richland Township	6.29	10.12	SR 529	Roundabout
Marion	Claridon Township	8.60	13.84	SR 95	
Marion	Claridon Township	10.96	17.64	SR 309	
Crawford	Dallas Township	18.20	29.29	SR 294 west	Eastern terminus of SR 294
Crawford	Bucyrus	23.98	38.59	SR 4 south	Southern end of SR 4 concurrency
Crawford	Bucyrus	24.84– 24.90	39.98– 40.07	SR 19 south / SR 100 south	Southern end of SR 19 and SR 100 concurrency
Crawford	Bucyrus	25.04	40.30	SR 4 north / SR 19 north / SR 100 north	Northern end of SR 4, SR 19, and SR 100 concurrency
Crawford	Bucyrus	26.47	42.60	US 30	
Crawford	Liberty Township	28.28	45.51	SR 96 east	Western terminus of SR 96
Crawford	Liberty–Vernon township line	33.06	53.20	SR 602	
Crawford	Auburn Township	38.04	61.22	SR 39	
Crawford	Auburn Township	40.76	65.60	SR 598	
Richland	Plymouth	45.65	73.47	SR 61 south	Southern end of SR 61 concurrency
Richland	Plymouth	46.18	74.32	SR 61 north / SR 603 south	northern end of SR 61 concurrency; northern terminus of SR 98; Northern terminus of SR 603
1.000 mi = 1.609 km; 1.000 km = 0.621 mi: Concurrency terminus
