= Ohio State Route 598 =

State highway in northern Ohio, US

State Route 598

Route information
- Maintained by ODOT
- Length: 23.43 mi (37.71 km)
- Existed: April 15, 1937–present

Major junctions
- South end: SR 309 / SR 61 / SR 19 in Galion
- US 30 near Galion; US 224 near Willard
- North end: SR 103 near Willard

Location
- Country: United States
- State: Ohio
- Counties: Crawford, Richland, Huron

Highway system
- Ohio State Highway System; Interstate; US; State; Scenic
← SR 596	→ SR 600

State Route 598 (SR 598) is a 23.43-mile-long (37.71 km) north–south state highway in the northern portion of the U.S. state of Ohio. The southern terminus of SR 598 is at a signalized intersection where it meets SR 19, SR 61 and SR 309 in Galion. Its northern terminus is at SR 103 nearly 1.75 miles (2.82 km) east of Willard.

== Route description ==
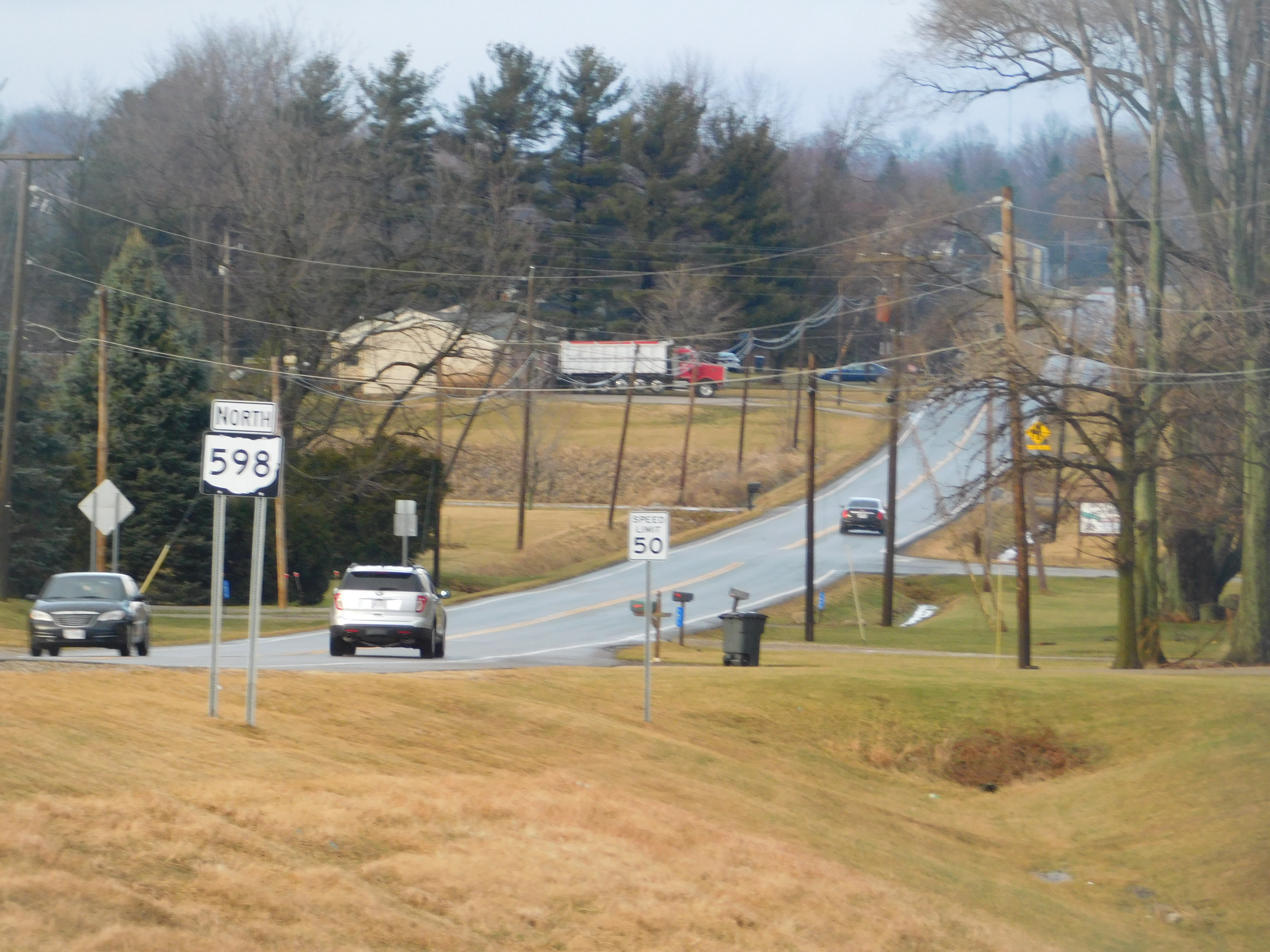
SR 598 north of US 30 in Galion

Along its path, SR 598 travels through eastern Crawford County, northwestern Richland County and southwestern Huron County. SR 598 is not included as a part of the National Highway System (NHS). The NHS is a network of routes identified as being most important for the economy, mobility and defense of the nation.

== History ==
SR 598 was applied on April 15, 1937 to a former county road. The highway was originally routed along its present alignment from its southern terminus in Galion to its junction with SR 98 northeast of Tiro. One year later, SR 598 was extended to the northeast along a previously un-numbered roadway, then northerly along a brief overlap of SR 61 and a short state highway that had carried the SR 289 designation to its current northern terminus at what was then the predecessor to SR 103, SR 194.

== Major intersections ==
County	Location	mi	km	Destinations	Notes
Crawford	Galion	0.00	0.00	SR 19 (Harding Way) / SR 61 / SR 309 (Portland Way)	
Crawford	Jefferson Township	1.99	3.20	US 30 – Bucyrus, Mansfield	Interchange
Crawford	Vernon Township	8.95	14.40	SR 96 west – Bucyrus	Southern end of SR 96 concurrency
Crawford	Vernon Township	9.08	14.61	SR 96 east – Shelby	Northern end of SR 96 concurrency
Crawford	Vernon Township	11.00	17.70	SR 39 – Tiro, Shelby	
Crawford	Auburn Township	14.91	24.00	SR 98 – Bucyrus, Plymouth	
Richland	No major junctions				
Huron	New Haven Township	21.86	35.18	SR 61 south – Plymouth	Southern end of SR 61 concurrency
Huron	New Haven Township	21.99	35.39	US 224 – Greenwich, Tiffin	
Huron	New Haven Township	22.25	35.81	SR 61 north – Norwalk	Northern end of SR 61 concurrency
Huron	New Haven Township	23.43	37.71	SR 103 (Boughtonville Road Extension) – Willard	
1.000 mi = 1.609 km; 1.000 km = 0.621 mi: Concurrency terminus
