= Galion, Ohio =

- City
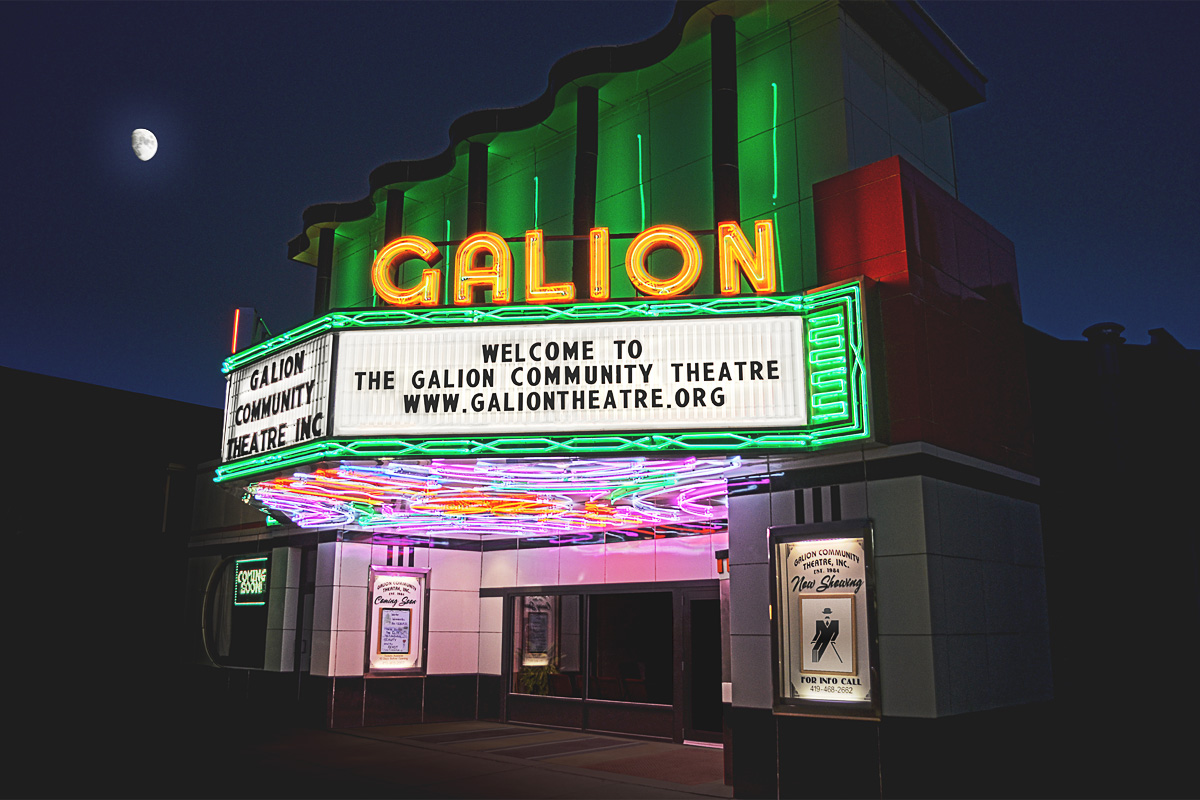
- The Galion Theatre located on Harding Way West in uptown Galion

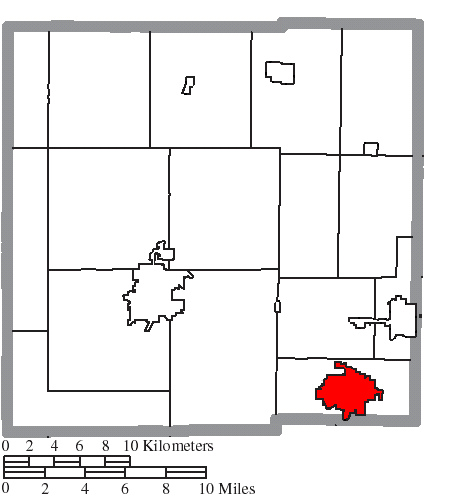
- Location of Galion in Crawford County

- Location within Ohio Location within the United States
- Coordinates: 40°43′59″N 82°47′19″W
- Country: United States
- State: Ohio
- Counties: Crawford, Morrow, Richland

Government
  - Type: Mayor-Council

Area
  - Total: 7.41 sq mi (19.20 km^{2})
  - Land: 7.39 sq mi (19.15 km^{2})
  - Water: 0.019 sq mi (0.05 km^{2})
- Elevation: 1,165 ft (355 m)

Population (2020)
  - Total: 10,453
  - Estimate (2023): 10,293
  - Density: 1,413.8/sq mi (545.88/km^{2})
- Time zone: UTC-5 (Eastern (EST))
  - Summer (DST): UTC-4 (EDT)
- ZIP code: 44833
- Area code: 419
- FIPS code: 39-29162
- GNIS feature ID: 1085937
- Website: http://www.galion.city

Galion (/ˈɡæljən/ GAL-yən) is a city in Crawford, Morrow, and Richland counties in the U.S. state of Ohio. The population was 10,453 at the 2020 census. Galion is the second-largest city in Crawford County after Bucyrus.

The Crawford County portion of Galion is part of the Bucyrus micropolitan statistical area. The small portion of the city that is located in Richland County is part of the Mansfield metropolitan area, while the portion extending into Morrow County is considered part of the Columbus, Ohio metropolitan area.

== History ==
The region was first inhabited by Native American tribes up until the first settlers, Benjamin Leveridge and his two sons, arrived in 1817. In 1820, William Hosford and his two sons, Asa and Horace, settled on land outside of the area. It was not until Colonel James Kilbourne decided to "lay out a town half way between Columbus and the Lakes" that the crossroads of Portland and Main street were settled by the Hosford family. This crossing was known by various names including: Moccasin, Horseshoe, Hard Scrabble, Spang Town, Hosfords and Goshen. Galion was laid out in 1831. However, in 1824 the town petitioned for a post office using the name Goshen and later changed to Galion by the postmaster general, John McLean, due to a town already being named Goshen in Ohio. The etymology of the name Galion is uncertain. A post office called Galion has been in operation since 1825.

Asa Hosford is considered the "Father of Galion" due to his work as a state legislator in which he did work to get a rail line through the area that was completed in 1851.

=== 1882 lynching ===
On April 30, 1882, in Galion, Ohio, a mob of around 2,000 people took Frank Fisher, an African American man accused of raping a white woman, from the town jail and lynched him. The mob hanged Fisher in broad daylight despite efforts by local authorities to intervene. The event was widely covered in newspapers at the time and is recognized as a tragic episode in Galion's history.

=== 2005 financial scandal ===
In 2005, Galion, Ohio, faced a major financial scandal when its former finance director, William Bauer, confessed to embezzling at least $87,000 from the city. Bauer’s mismanagement left the town $11 million in debt, resulting in significant cuts to city services. Programs such as the D.A.R.E. antidrug initiative were eliminated, police cruisers and computers were sold, and road projects were scrapped. Residents faced higher taxes and utility costs, while volunteers stepped in to clean parks and fund community events.

Bauer, who had been finance director since 1985, admitted to stealing money due to a gambling addiction and credit card problems. He attempted suicide before being sentenced and was blinded in the attempt. Bauer later pleaded guilty to five counts of embezzlement, avoiding a trial that would have revealed more details of his crimes. Despite his confession, questions about where the stolen funds went remained unanswered.

The State Auditor placed Galion in fiscal emergency, appointing a board to help the city recover financially, which was expected to take five years. City officials, who trusted Bauer due to his longstanding reputation, implemented new financial safeguards to prevent future fraud.

== Geography ==
Galion is located in the southeastern corner of Crawford County.

According to the United States Census Bureau, the city has a total area of 7.63 square miles (19.76 km^{2}), of which 7.61 square miles (19.71 km^{2}) is land and 0.02 square miles (0.05 km^{2}) is water.

Galion lies just south of a continental divide. The Olentangy River begins near and runs through Galion, and then winds southward toward Columbus and eventually empties into the Scioto River, a tributary of the Ohio and thus of the Mississippi. However, Lake Galion, which lies just north of town, is part of the Sandusky River watershed, which drains via Lakes Erie and Ontario into the Saint Lawrence River.

== Demographics ==
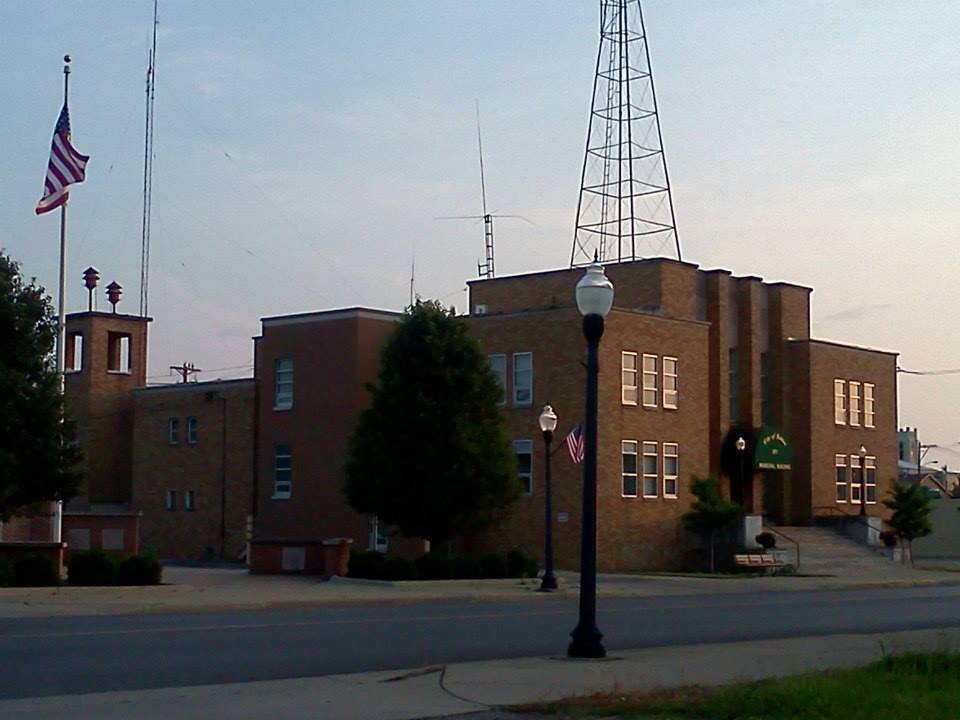
Galion's Municipal Building on Harding Way East, which houses the city's administrative offices as well as the police and fire departments.

Historical population
Census	Pop.	Note	%±
1860	1,966		—
1870	3,523		79.2%
1880	5,635		59.9%
1890	6,326		12.3%
1900	7,282		15.1%
1910	7,214		−0.9%
1920	7,374		2.2%
1930	7,674		4.1%
1940	8,685		13.2%
1950	9,952		14.6%
1960	12,650		27.1%
1970	13,123		3.7%
1980	12,424		−5.3%
1990	11,859		−4.5%
2000	11,341		−4.4%
2010	10,512		−7.3%
2020	10,453		−0.6%
2023 (est.)	10,293		−1.5%
U.S. Decennial Census

=== 2020 census ===
As of the 2020 census, Galion had a population of 10,453. The median age was 42.5 years; 21.6% of residents were under the age of 18 and 20.6% were 65 years of age or older. For every 100 females there were 90.0 males, and for every 100 females age 18 and over there were 88.3 males age 18 and over.

97.5% of residents lived in urban areas, while 2.5% lived in rural areas.

There were 4,544 households in Galion, of which 26.5% had children under the age of 18 living in them. Of all households, 36.3% were married-couple households, 20.8% were households with a male householder and no spouse or partner present, and 33.0% were households with a female householder and no spouse or partner present. About 35.5% of all households were made up of individuals and 16.6% had someone living alone who was 65 years of age or older.

There were 5,165 housing units, of which 12.0% were vacant. The homeowner vacancy rate was 2.8% and the rental vacancy rate was 10.6%.

Racial composition as of the 2020 census
Race	Number	Percent
White	9,759	93.4%
Black or African American	65	0.6%
American Indian and Alaska Native	16	0.2%
Asian	21	0.2%
Native Hawaiian and Other Pacific Islander	5	0.0%
Some other race	61	0.6%
Two or more races	526	5.0%
Hispanic or Latino (of any race)	210	2.0%

=== 2010 census ===
As of the census of 2010, there were 10,512 people, 4,484 households, and 2,797 families living in the city. The population density was 1,381.3 inhabitants per square mile (533.3/km^{2}). There were 5,192 housing units at an average density of 682.3 per square mile (263.4/km^{2}). The racial makeup of the city was 97.6% White, 0.5% African American, 0.1% Native American, 0.2% Asian, 0.4% from other races, and 1.1% from two or more races. Hispanic or Latino of any race were 1.3% of the population.

There were 4,484 households, of which 30.8% had children under the age of 18 living with them, 43.7% were married couples living together, 14.2% had a female householder with no husband present, 4.5% had a male householder with no wife present, and 37.6% were non-families. 32.0% of all households were made up of individuals, and 13.8% had someone living alone who was 65 years of age or older. The average household size was 2.32 and the average family size as 2.89.

The median age in the city was 39.7 years. 24.3% of residents were under the age of 18; 8.2% were between the ages of 18 and 24; 24.6% were from 25 to 44; 25.7% were from 45 to 64; and 17.3% were 65 years of age or older. The gender makeup of the city was 47.1% male and 52.9% female.

=== 2000 census ===
As of the census of 2000, there were 11,341 people, 4,791 households, and 3,090 families living in the city. The population density was 2,286.5 inhabitants per square mile (882.8/km^{2}). There were 5,150 housing units at an average density of 1,038.3 per square mile (400.9/km^{2}). The racial makeup of the city was 98.28% White, 0.22% African American, 0.31% Native American, 0.26% Asian, 0.01% Pacific Islander, 0.35% from other races, and 0.56% from two or more races. Hispanic or Latino of any race were 0.93% of the population.

There were 4,791 households, out of which 31.0% had children under the age of 18 living with them, 48.3% were married couples living together, 12.2% had a female householder with no husband present, and 35.5% were non-families. 30.7% of all households were made up of individuals, and 13.6% had someone living alone who was 65 years of age or older. The average household size was 2.34 and the average family size was 2.90.

In the city the population was spread out, with 25.5% under the age of 18, 8.5% from 18 to 24, 27.8% from 25 to 44, 22.2% from 45 to 64, and 16.0% who were 65 years of age or older. The median age was 37 years. For every 100 females, there were 85.6 males. For every 100 females age 18 and over, there were 82.7 males.

The median income for a household in the city was $31,513, and the median income for a family was $38,554. Males had a median income of $32,517 versus $19,792 for females. The per capita income for the city was $16,113. About 11.9% of families and 14.7% of the population were below the poverty line, including 19.6% of those under age 18 and 11.3% of those age 65 or over.

== Economy ==
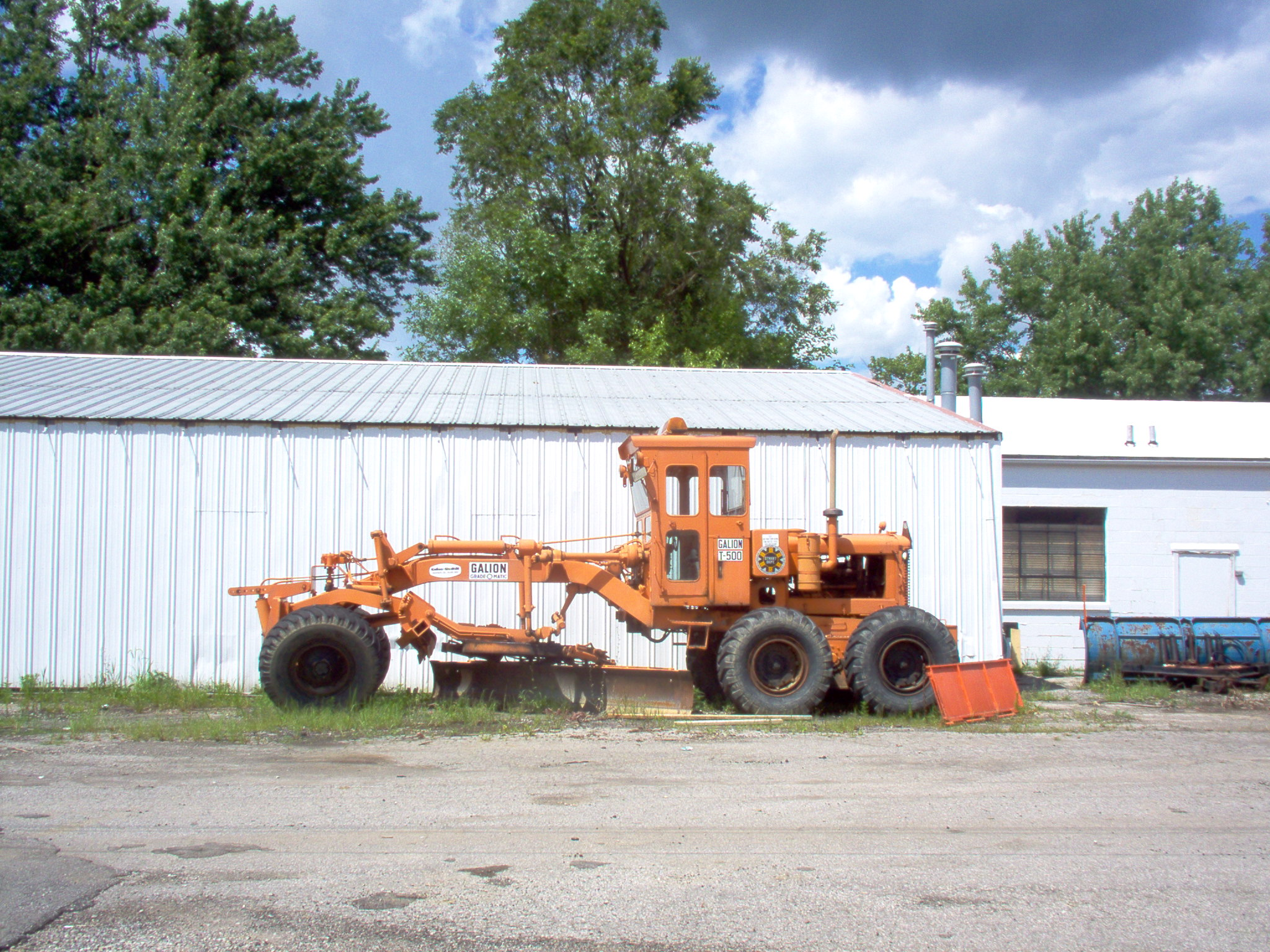
Galion road grader

The Galion brand of heavy equipment, such as road graders, road rollers, and earthmovers, was manufactured by Galion Iron Works, later purchased by Dresser Industries and then by Komatsu.

Galion was once the home of Peabody Galion, a manufacturer of sanitation equipment, primarily dump bodies, as well as front loading, side-loading and rear loading garbage trucks; rivaling the Heil Company for numbers of units sold throughout the world. For a short time, in the early 1970s, Peabody Galion maintained a manufacturing plant in Durant, Oklahoma, known as "Peabody Galion, Durant Division".

Galion was also once home to North Electric Company, a prime supplier of telephone switching systems for government and international markets. It was also producer of the Ericofon, the first ever one-piece telephone designed by Ralph Lysell and Hugo Blomberg. Founded in 1884 by Charles N. North, the company became part of Ericsson in 1951. It was purchased by ITT in the mid-1970s and operated as ITT PowerSystems until the late 1980s, when it was sold to a private consortium and renamed PECO II (the name is derived from North Electric Company's purchase of Power Equipment Company (PECO) in 1960). Peco II purchased the telecommunications product line and associated assets from ITT in 1988. In 2010, PECO II was acquired by Lineage Power of Plano, Texas and has since closed the plant.

== Arts and culture ==
=== Community organizations ===
The Galion Community Theatre (GCT), founded in 1972, has been a cultural cornerstone of the city, offering a platform for both local talent and a broad range of theatrical performances. Located in downtown Galion, the theater operates out of a historic building that adds to the town’s charm and cultural landscape. The GCT presents a variety of productions throughout the year, including musicals, plays, and children’s theater, catering to diverse audiences.

In addition to its mainstage productions, GCT serves as an educational space, hosting workshops and classes that foster community engagement with the performing arts. These programs provide creative outlets for aspiring actors, directors, and technicians of all ages. The theater is particularly known for its role in nurturing young talent through youth programs, giving children and teens a chance to participate in live theater, both on stage and behind the scenes. The Galion Community Theatre’s impact extends beyond entertainment. It strengthens community bonds by offering residents a venue for socializing, volunteering, and participating in cultural events. Local participation is encouraged through open auditions and the involvement of volunteers in various capacities, from set design to production support. This has made the theater a vital part of Galion’s social and cultural identity. Additionally, the theater collaborates with local businesses and organizations, further embedding itself in the community by hosting special events, fundraisers, and themed performances that resonate with local traditions and causes.

The Galion History Center is a historical institution located in Galion, Ohio, dedicated to preserving and sharing the history of the city and its surrounding areas. Housed in several historic buildings, including the Brownella Cottage and the Galion Historical Museum, the center offers visitors a glimpse into the community’s cultural and architectural heritage. The centerpiece, Brownella Cottage, is a Victorian-era home built in 1887 for Bishop William Montgomery Brown, a notable figure in Galion’s history. The cottage is built in the Gothic architectural style, and the center offers guided tours about Bishop Brown. The center also features exhibits, archives, and collections that document the industrial, social, and cultural evolution of Galion. It also hosts educational programs, special events, and community engagement activities.

=== Festivals ===
The Pickle Run Festival began in 1961 and was said to have been inspired "when a grocer used to dump his old pickles into the Whetstone Creek behind his store and the pickles would run through the creek." The festival would include events like the Pickle Run 5k, car show, watermelon diving competition along with carnival rides and food vendors among other things. The Pickle Run did not run from 1998 up till 2015 when volunteers started the Pickle Run festival over moving the original date on Labor Day to the Fourth of July weekend.

Started by the Galion Jaycees in 1976 and later ran by the local Moose Lodge, the Galion Oktoberfest is the city's fall festival that runs on the last weekend of September in the city's Uptowne Business District. This three day event features a carnival with rides and vendors as well as live music.

Depot Days an annual event held at the Big Four Depot in Galion, Ohio, celebrating the city’s rich railroad history. This event invites visitors to explore the restored depot, which once served as a hub for the Cleveland, Cincinnati, Chicago & St. Louis Railway, also known as the Big Four. The day typically features guided tours of the depot. Guests learn about Galion’s role in regional and national railroad history through exhibits and presentations. Depot Day also includes model train displays, live music, and food vendors. The event often features guest speakers.

Third Friday in Galion is a monthly community event held during the warmer months in Uptowne Galion, Ohio. The celebration features a mix of live music, local food vendors, arts and crafts, and other activities.

Come Home to Galion is an annual holiday tradition in Galion, Ohio. Held in Uptowne Galion, this event typically takes place in late November or early December and features a variety of activities, entertainment, and attractions.

=== Historic landmarks ===
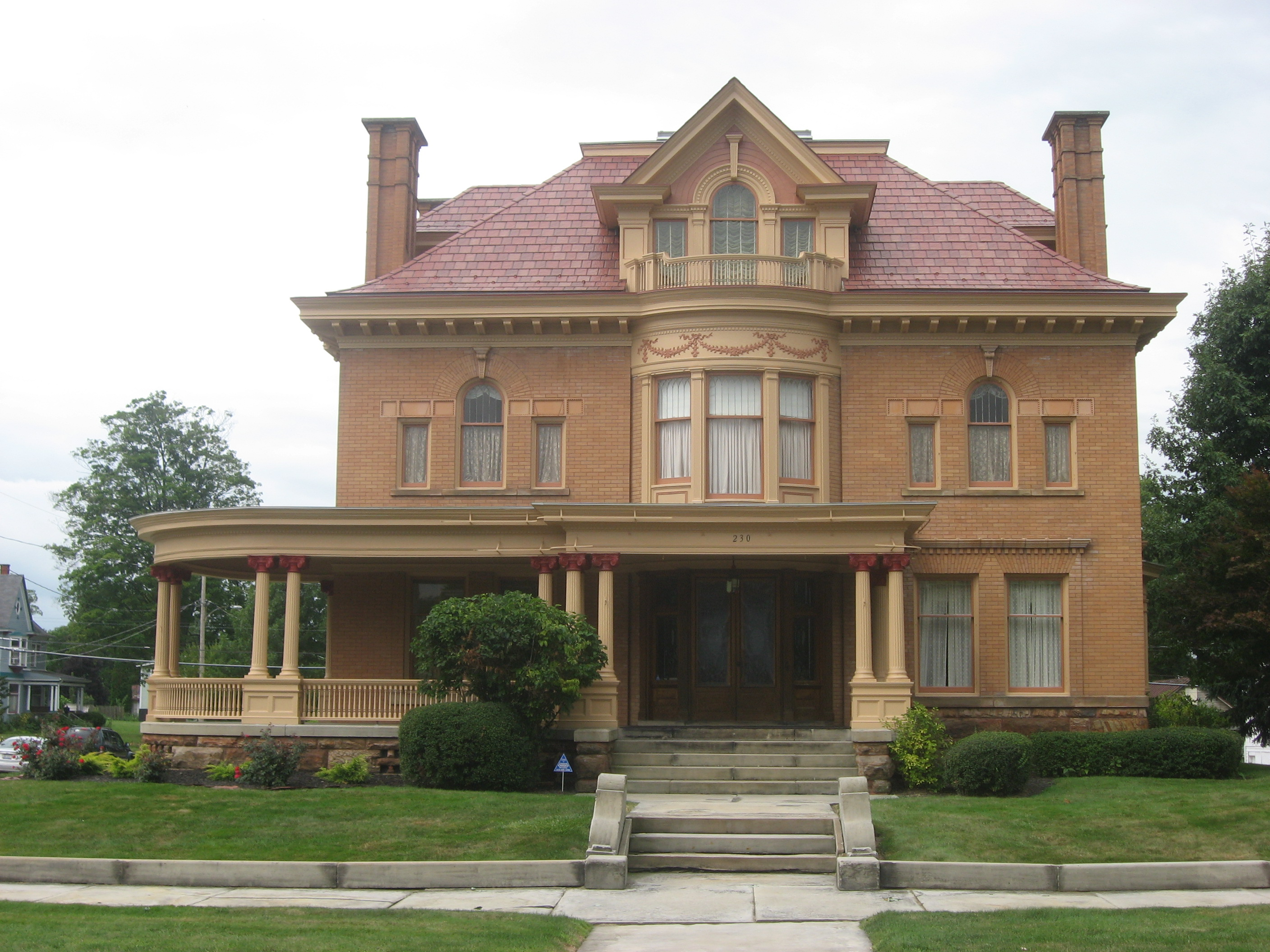
The Adam Howard House

Home of the founder of the Galion Buggy Company, the house was listed on the National Register of Historic Places on March 30, 1978 and is located on South Boston Street. The 7,200-square-foot (670 m^{2}) home was built in 1898 and was later owned by the Galion Historical Society and sat vacant for 50 years until its auction to Tim and Connie Musselman in 2015. The Victorian-era house designed by Vernon Redding features "massive pillars on the front porch, a golden oak vestibule and carved stairs leading to a circular balustrade and ballroom, all illuminated by a stained-glass skylight."

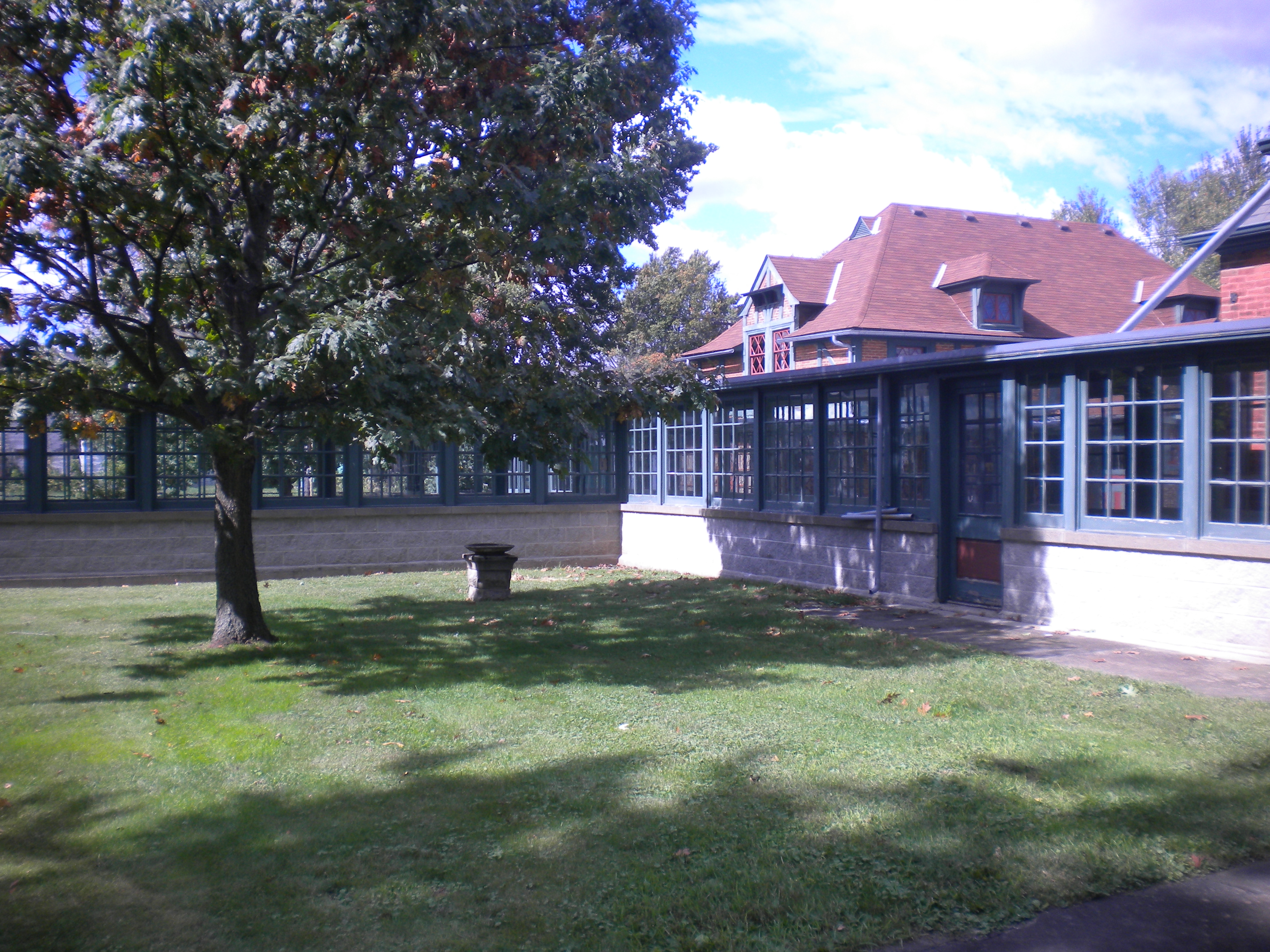
The Causeway at Brownella Cottage

Brownella Cottage and Grace Episcopal Church and Rectory is a historic church complex at S. Union and Walnut Streets. The site is significant for its association with Bishop William Montgomery Brown, notable as the first bishop of his communion to be tried for heresy since the Reformation and "'the first of any creed in America to be deposed for heretical teaching'".

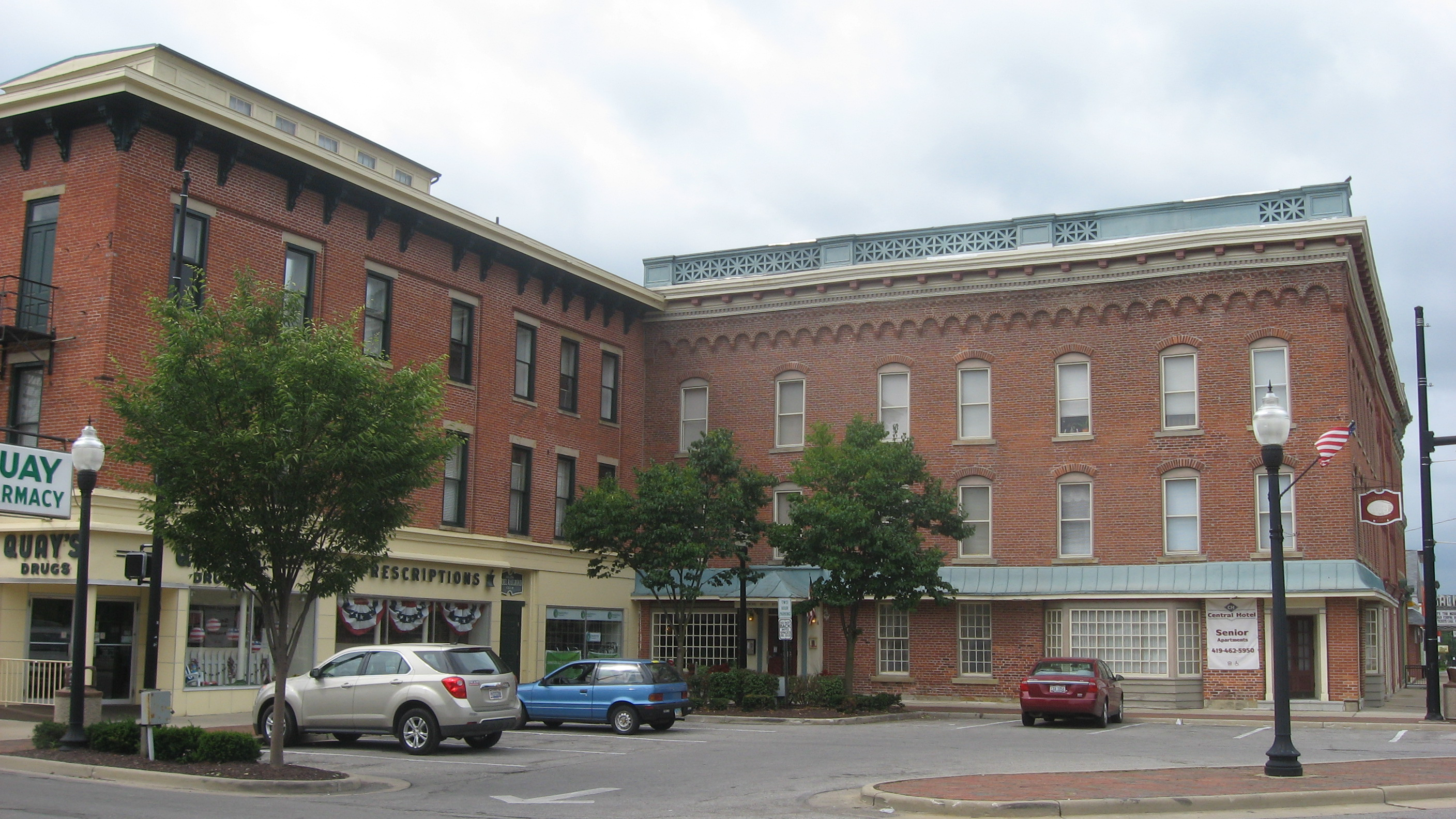
The Central Hotel, Hackedorn and Zimmerman Building

The Central Hotel is a combination of three buildings that are all that remains of Galion's commercial boom in the 1860s. The Central Hotel was registered on the National Historic Registry on Nav.13, 1976 but did not see any significant improvements until it was procured by the Ohio Capital Corporation for Housing in 2004. The non-profit led a significant restructuring and investment into the building and the building is now an affordable housing for seniors.

The Hessenauer Cabin, which is located on Cedar Point’s Frontier Trail, was originally built around 1835 near Galion, Ohio, by an early settler named Adam Rensch. This log cabin is one of the few historic structures on the Frontier Trail with a marker providing details about its origins. The cabin now serves as a Candle Shop where visitors can purchase candles and even hand-dip their own. The cabin is part of a broader effort by Cedar Point to recreate the atmosphere of early American frontier life, featuring various historic and reconstructed buildings along the Frontier Trail. While some structures on the trail are more modern recreations, the Hessenauer Cabin is notable for being an authentic historical structure, albeit retrofitted with modern amenities like electricity and an ADA access ramp.

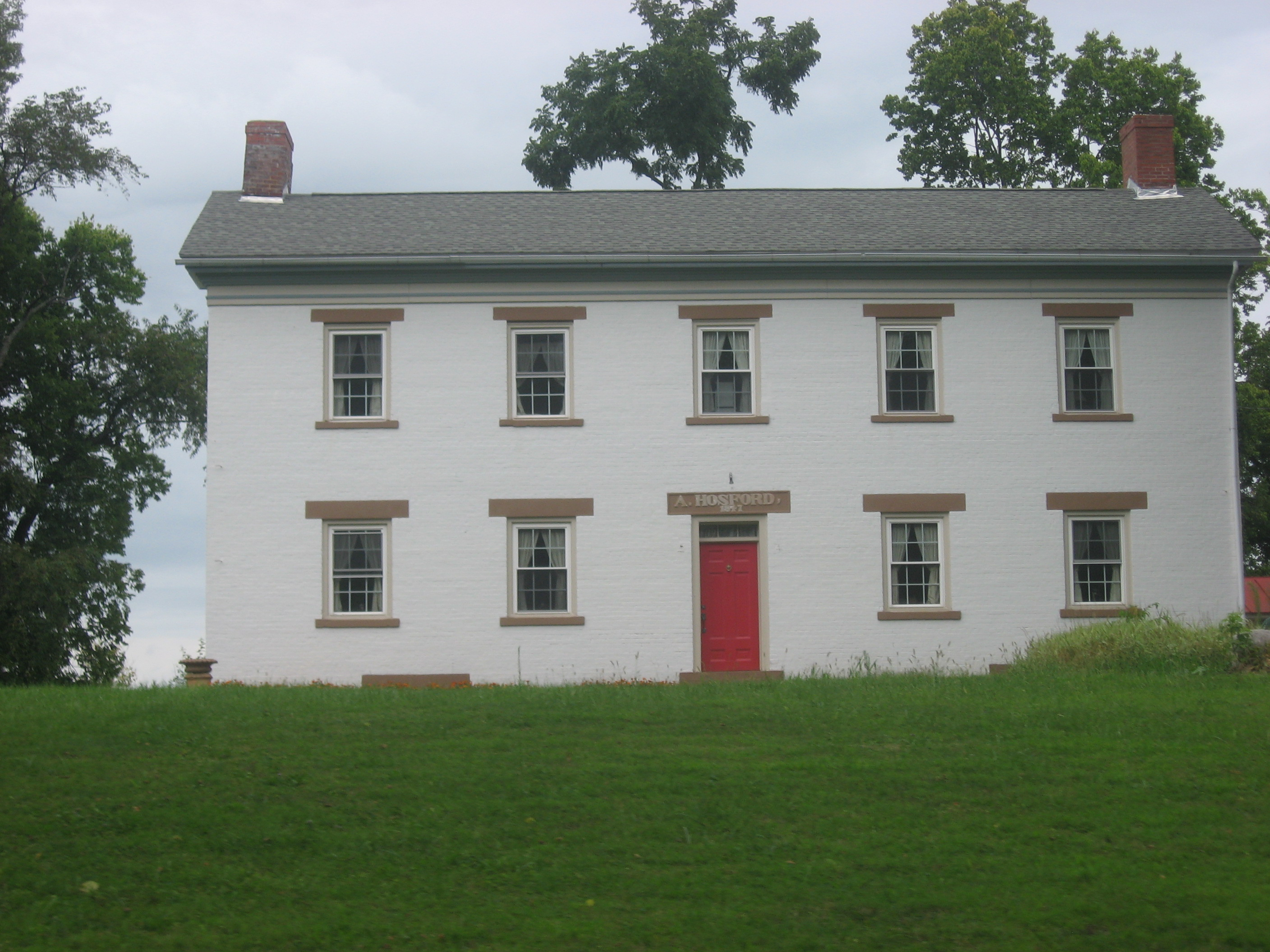
Front of the Hosford House

The Hosford House was built in 1892 by Asa Hosford and listed on the National Historic Registry on April 30, 1976. Asa Hosford is considered the "Father of Galion" due to his work as a state legislator to get a rail line through the area that was completed in 1851.

Galion, Ohio, is home to four Lustron homes, which are notable for their unique post-World War II design. Lustron homes were prefabricated, all-metal houses produced between 1948 and 1950, designed to address the housing shortage in America after the war. Constructed from enameled steel panels, these homes were durable, low-maintenance, and featured modern conveniences for the time. The homes in Galion are part of this architectural innovation and stand as examples of mid-century modern design. Today, these Lustron homes are recognized as historically significant due to their rarity and contribution to post-war housing developments in the United States.

== Government ==
The government of Galion, Ohio, operates under a mayor-council system, with the mayor acting as the city’s chief executive officer. The city council serves as the legislative branch and is composed of seven members—four representing specific wards and three at-large members representing the entire city. This structure allows for a balance between local representation and broader city-wide governance.

The city provides essential services through its various departments, including public safety, utilities, public works, and parks and recreation. The government prioritizes community engagement, with public city council meetings open to residents, ensuring transparency and allowing citizens to participate in the decision-making process. Galion’s administrative offices are located at 301 Harding Way East, and city council meetings are regularly held to address local issues.

== Education ==
=== Public schools ===
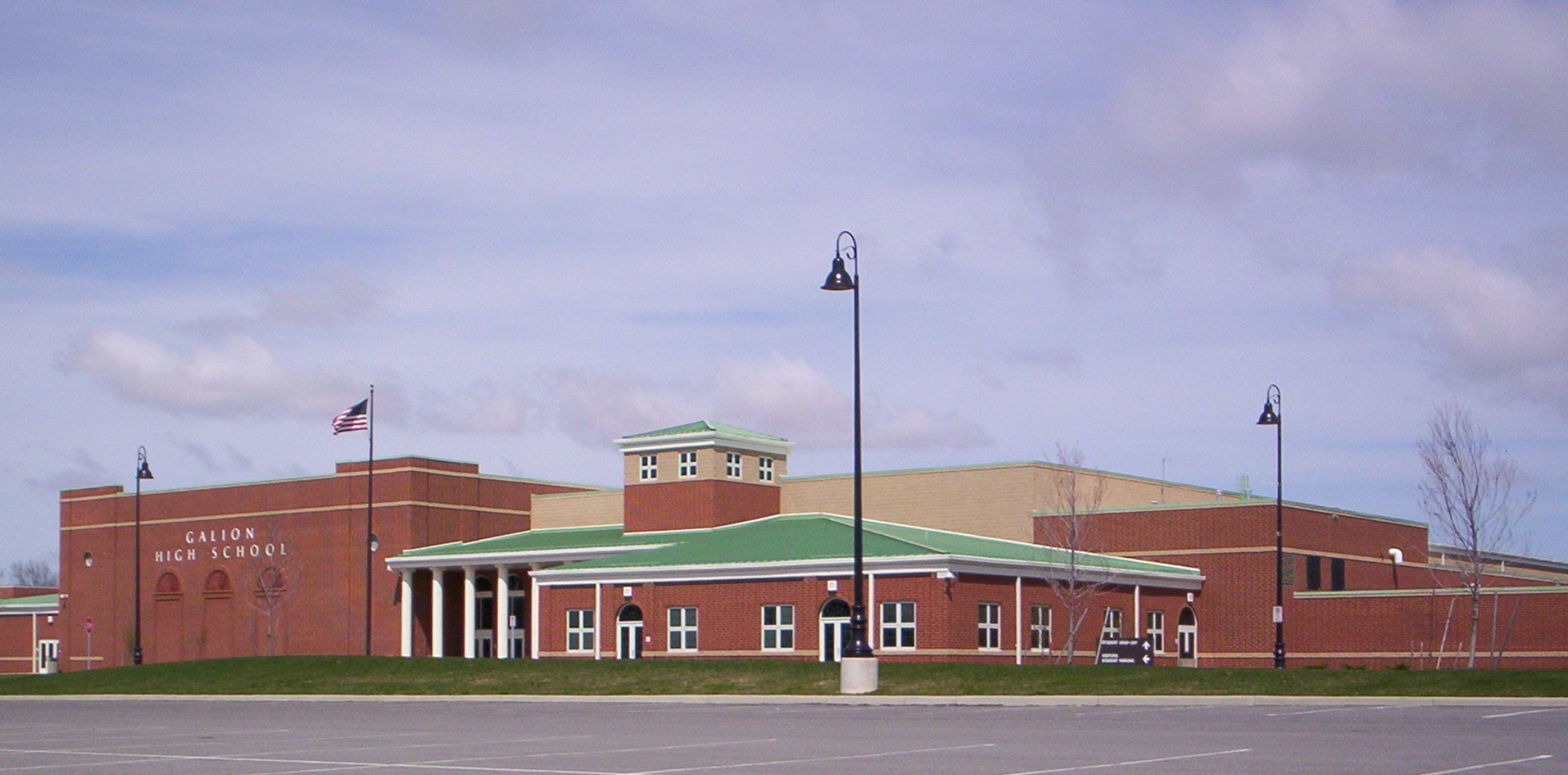
Galion High School, which opened in late 2007

The Galion City School District encompasses the entire city of Galion, graduating about 150 students annually. There are a handful of neighborhoods outside of Galion that are also included in the school district, including Blooming Grove. Galion High School serves students ranging from grades 9 through 12. The school colors are blue and orange and its athletic teams are known as the Tigers. The current high school building opened in 2007 following the demolition of the previous home of Galion High School on North Union Street.

The first Galion Union High School was built in 1868 on West Walnut Street and served as Galion High School until 1917. This building was demolished in 1924 and a new junior high school was built on the site in 1925, which was razed in April 2008. The second home of GHS was built in 1917 on the site of a former cemetery on North Union Street. This building was extended in 1962, adding features such as a large gymnasium. This building was in use until the end of the 2006–2007 school year, with the new Galion High School opening in late 2007.

=== Library ===
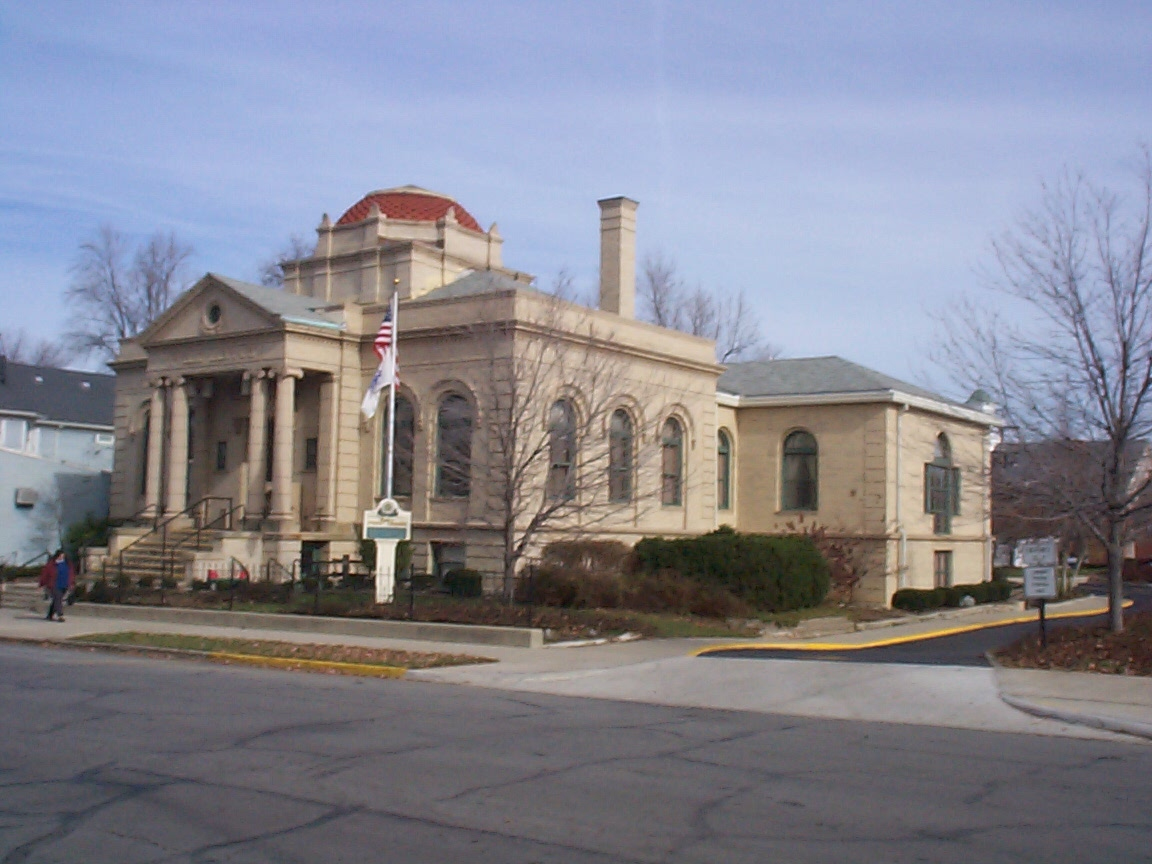
Galion Public Library

The Galion Public Library was formally dedicated on April 28, 1904. The "purely 20th century synthesis of Greek and Roman designs" was designed by Vernon Redding a prominent architect from Mansfield, Ohio that designed the Mansfield Public Library using the Galion design as a foundation. However, the organization and establishment of the current library were made from the efforts of a woman's organization called The Current News Club. The organization pushed for the establishment of a public library and started a library fund that had been started using funds from other organizations and contributions from citizens of Galion. In 1898, a state law was passed providing for a mandatory establishment of a library through the Boards of Education in Galion due to its size. The Current News Club incorporated the Galion Public Library Association on March 26, 1901 with "the purpose of building and opening a public library free to all the citizens of the Galion Public School district." The association purchased the land in which the building currently resides on North Market street for $2,850 in which "the lot already had an old log residence on it, one of the oldest buildings in the city, and was one of the early school houses half a century previously." This log building, now located in Heise Park, provided for a comfortable "reading room" and "became the pride and glory of the infant library association" but quickly became too small for to serve the citizens of Galion. In February 1902 the association sent representatives to meet with Andrew Carnegie to seek financial assistance in building a new library and was approved for $15,000 with a "guarantee of an annual support for the library of not less than ten percent of that amount" which was later approved by the city council with a resolution that passed on April 18, 1902.

== Media ==
Galion and neighboring communities are served by a semi-weekly newspaper, the Galion Inquirer. The city's first newspaper, The District Democrat, was founded in 1855 and later sold and renamed The Galion Train.

Galion radio station 102.3 The Fox is a classic rock station based in Galion, Ohio. It broadcasts a wide range of rock music from the 1960s through the 1990s, catering to fans of artists like Led Zeppelin, The Rolling Stones, Aerosmith, and Pink Floyd. The station is popular for its mix of music and local programming, including community updates, news, and sports coverage, particularly focused on local high school sports. 102.3 The Fox also features radio personalities who engage with listeners through various on-air segments and promotions, making it a favorite for classic rock enthusiasts in the Galion and surrounding areas.

== Infrastructure ==
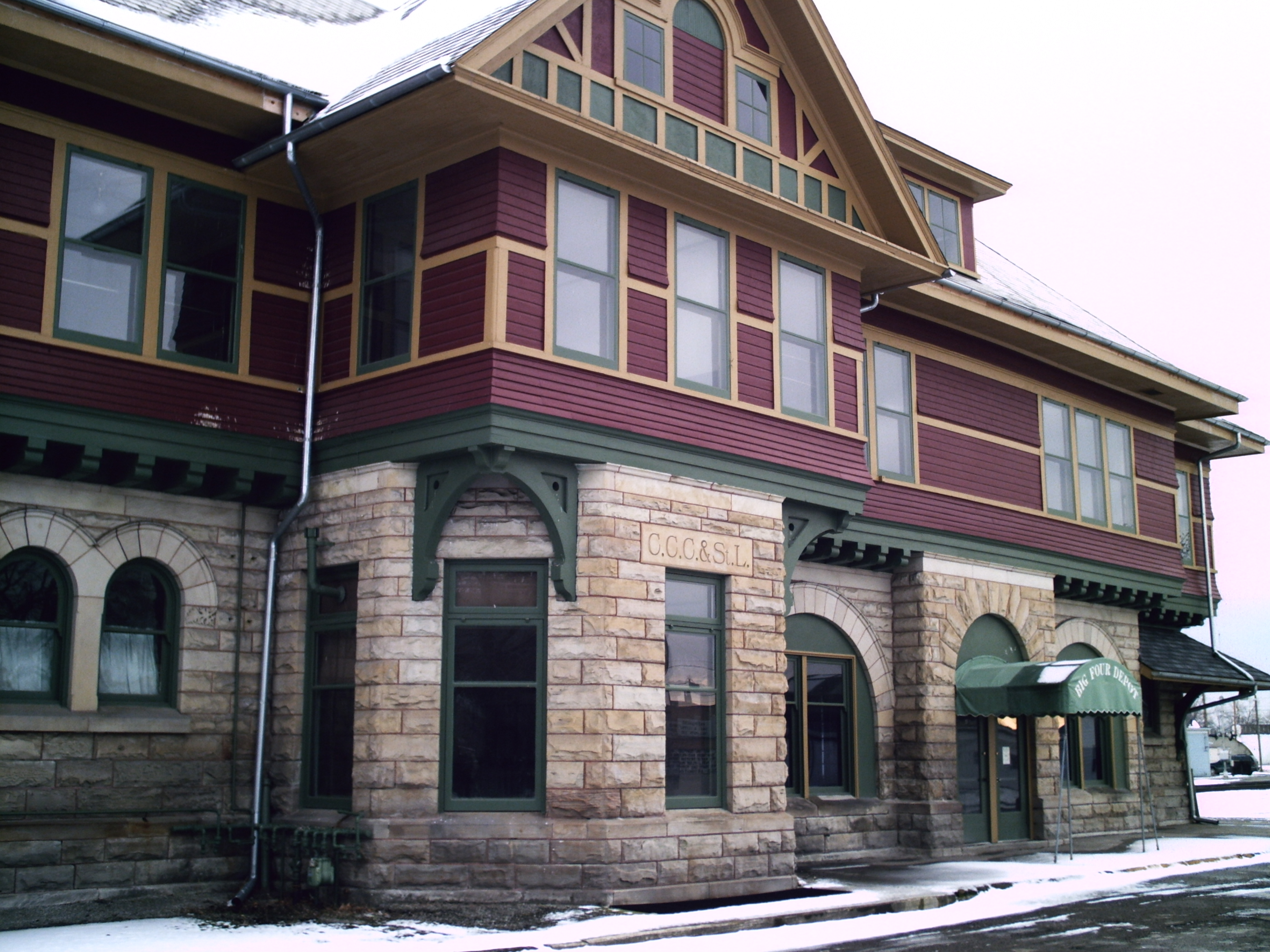
"Big Four" train depot

=== Healthcare ===
Healthcare in Galion, Ohio, is primarily provided through a network of local clinics, hospitals, and specialized medical services. The city is served by Avita Health System, which operates Avita Galion Hospital, a full-service facility offering emergency care, surgical services, and a range of outpatient services. Avita is a key healthcare provider in the region, with additional locations in nearby towns like Bucyrus and Ontario. The hospital plays a crucial role in providing healthcare for both routine and critical needs for Galion and the surrounding areas.

Additionally, Galion has access to various healthcare clinics and specialists, offering services in family medicine, physical therapy, and mental health. The city’s healthcare system also connects with larger medical centers in nearby metropolitan areas for more specialized treatments.

=== Transportation ===
The Erie Railroad also ran through Galion and established large rail yards here, making the city an important rail center. In April, 1851 the Cleveland Columbus and Cincinnati Railroad, later known as the "Big Four" and eventually the New York Central, began operating regular service between Columbus and Cleveland, stopping at Galion along the way. Prior to the end of the 19th century, Galion became a division headquarters for the line.

Galion once boasted two large railroad depots. The Big Four Depot at 127 Washington Street served passenger trains until 1971. The Erie Depot on South Market Street, served until 1970 and the 1891 structure was demolished later that year. With the move of the Erie yards to Marion in the 1910s, the railroads declined, although the city remained a passenger rail center into the 1960s. The Big Four Depot was abandoned; however, it has since been acquired by the City of Galion and is undergoing a slow but thorough restoration.

Galion, Ohio, 1891. Shows the original North Central railyard and roundhouse.

From 1915 to 1923, Galion was on the original route of the Lincoln Highway, America's first coast-to-coast route. In later years, however, the northern route was improved and became US 30 North, although until approximately 1970 the route through Galion was designated as US 30 South. The new, four-lane US 30 opened in 2005, and passes just north of town, giving the community excellent transportation access.

State routes in Galion include 309, which connects Marion to the southwest with Ontario to the east; 598, which originates in Galion and stretches northward; 19, which heads westward toward the county seat and also south toward Williamsport; 61, which goes south towards Morrow and Delaware Counties and north to Lake Erie, and 97, which goes east through Lexington.

The Galion Municipal Airport is located three nautical miles (3.5 mi; 5.6 km) northeast of Galion's central business district.

== Notable people ==
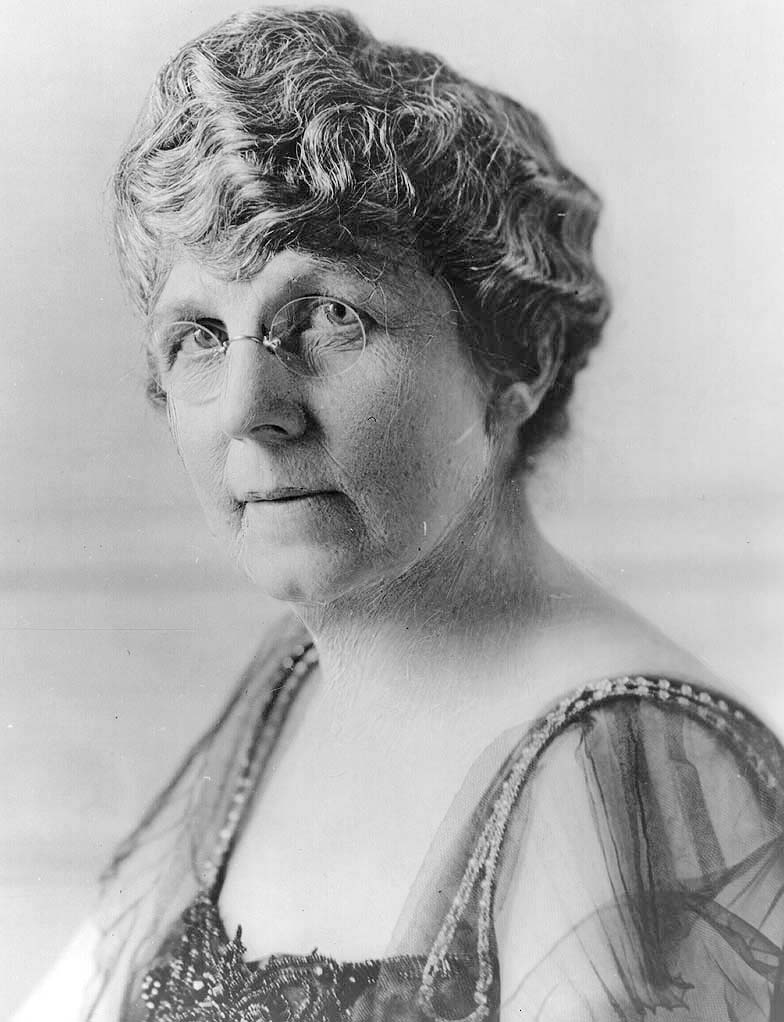
Photo of former First Lady, Florence Kling Harding, former resident of Galion, Ohio.

- Logan Bartholomew, actor
- Julius H. Block, Minnesota State Treasurer
- William Montgomery Brown, Episcopal clergyman and author
- Florence Kling Harding, First Lady of the United States
- Henry David Lee, founder of the HD Lee Mercantile Company, inventors of Lee Jeans
- Donald McClarren, politician
- Robert W. Morgan, radio personality
- Orville Nave, theologian and chaplain
- Nate Reinking, professional basketball player
- Bob Schnelker, professional football player in the National Football League
- JB Shuck, professional baseball player in Major League Baseball
