= Clear Fork Mohican River =

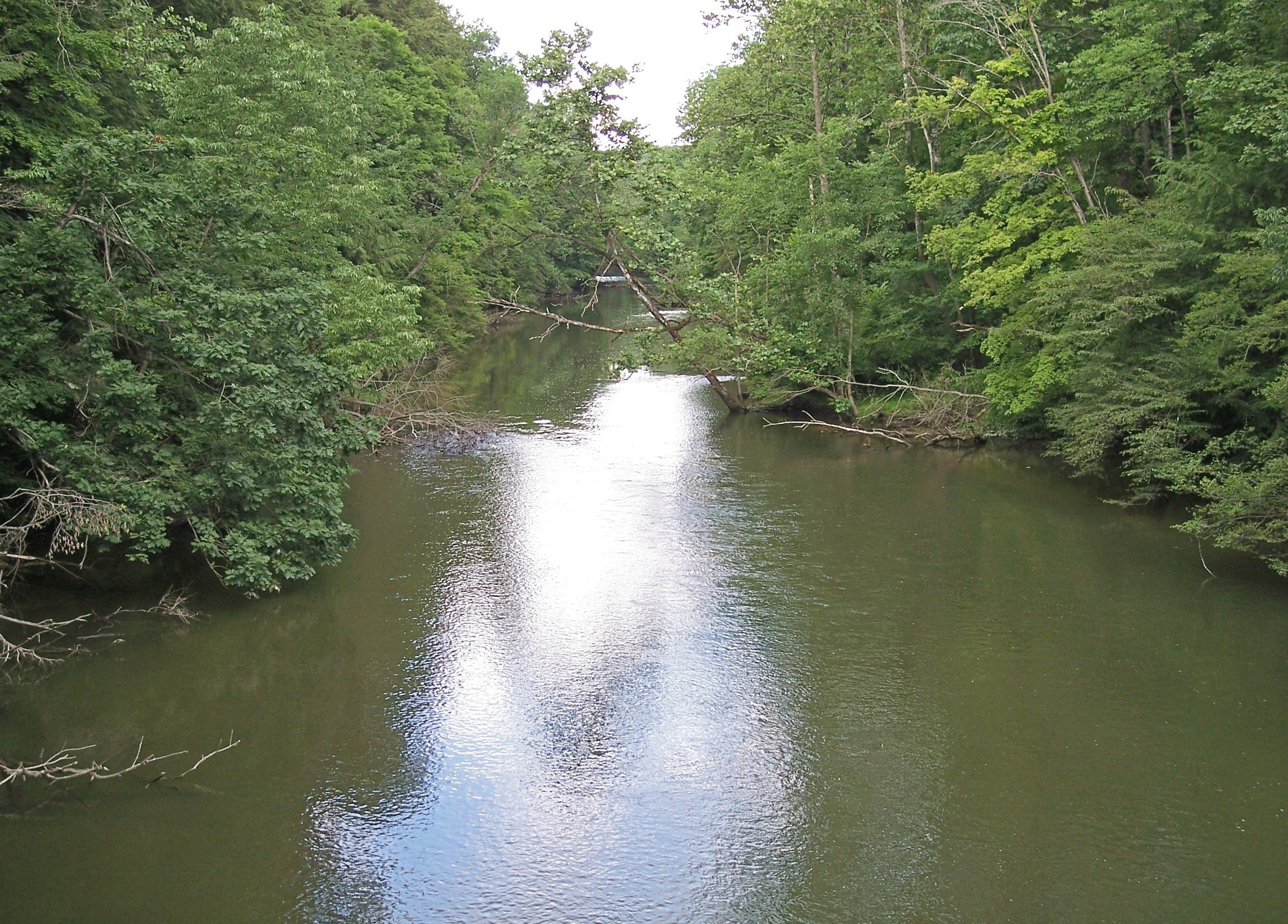
- The Clear Fork in Mohican State Park in southern Ashland County, Ohio

Location
- Country: United States
- State: Ohio

Physical characteristics
- Source
  - location: Morrow County, Ohio
  - coordinates: 40°46′31″N 82°38′26″W
- Mouth
  - location: near Loudonville, Ohio
  - coordinates: 40°36′30″N 82°15′14″W
- Length: 36.6 mi (58.9 km)
- Basin size: 219 mi^{2} (570 km^{2})
- Discharge
  - location: near Perrysville
  - average: 200 cu ft/s (5.7 m^{3}/s)

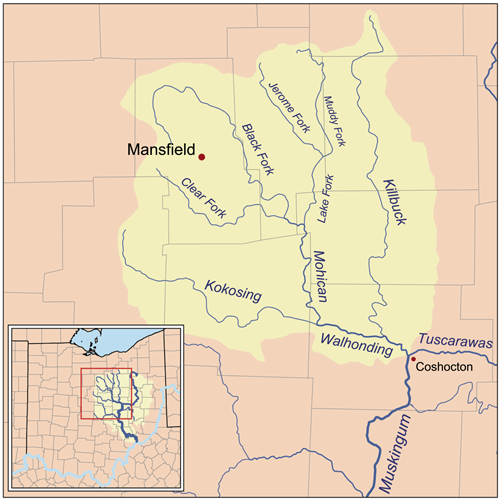
Map of the Walhonding watershed showing the Clear Fork Mohican River

The Clear Fork is a principal tributary of the Mohican River, 36.6 miles (58.9 km) long, in north central Ohio in the United States. Via the Mohican, Walhonding, Muskingum and Ohio Rivers, it is part of the watershed of the Mississippi River, draining an area of 219 square miles (570 km^{2}). According to the Geographic Names Information System, it has also been known historically as "Clear Creek" and as "Clear Fork Mohecan Creek".

The Clear Fork rises in northeastern Morrow County and flows generally eastwardly through southern Richland and Ashland Counties, past the towns of Lexington, Bellville and Butler, and through Mohican State Park. It joins the Black Fork to form the Mohican River in Ashland County, about 2 miles (3.2 km) southwest of Loudonville.

Upstream of Lexington, a 1949 dam causes the river to form Clear Fork Reservoir, which provides drinking water to the city of Mansfield. In Ashland County, a 1936 U.S. Army Corps of Engineers dam causes the river to form Pleasant Hill Lake.

== See also ==
- List of rivers of Ohio
