= Clear Fork Reservoir =

Water reservoir in Ohio, United States

- Location within Ohio Location within the United States
- Location: Richland / Morrow counties, Ohio, United States
- Coordinates: 40°41′54″N 82°36′24″W
- Basin countries: United States
- Surface area: 997 acres (403 ha)
- Average depth: 10 ft (3.0 m)
- Max. depth: 40 ft (12 m) est.
- Water volume: 4,400,000,000 U.S. gallons (17,000,000 m^{3})
- Shore length^{1}: 14 mi (23 km)
- Surface elevation: 1,202 ft (366 m)
- ^{1} Shore length is not a well-defined measure.

The Clear Fork Reservoir is a reservoir (as a man-made lake) on the Clear Fork river in the area of Richland County and Morrow County in the U.S. state of Ohio. It was designed and built in 1949 to be the main source of drinking water for the city of Mansfield, Ohio.
