= Mid-Ohio Athletic Conference =

High school athletic conference

The Mid-Ohio Athletic Conference is an Ohio High School Athletic Association (OHSAA) athletic league whose members are located in the Ohio counties of Crawford, Marion, Morrow and Richland. The league was established in the fall of 1990.

== Current members ==
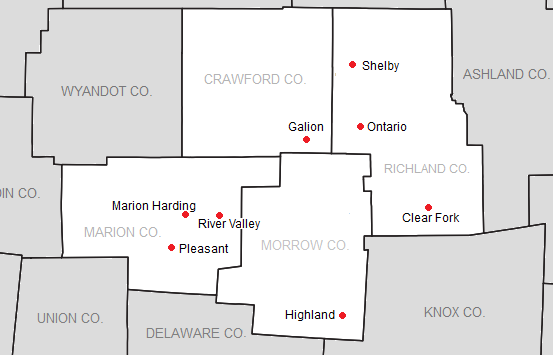
MOAC membership

School	Nickname	Location	Colors	Joined
Clear Fork	Colts	Bellville		2017
Galion	Tigers	Galion		2014
Highland	Fighting Scots	Marengo		2021; football in 2022
Marion Harding	Presidents	Marion		2014
Ontario	Warriors	Ontario		2017
Pleasant	Spartans	Marion		1990
River Valley	Vikings	Caledonia		1990
Shelby	Whippets	Shelby		2018

== Former members ==
School	Nickname	Location	Colors	Tenure	Left For
Ridgedale	Rockets	Morral		1990-2014	N10
Upper Sandusky	Rams	Upper Sandusky		Fall 2014 (football only)	N10
Fairbanks	Panthers	Milford Center		2013-2015(2013-2016 Football)	OHC
Jonathan Alder	Pioneers	Plain City		2013-2017	CBC
Cardington-Lincoln	Pirates	Cardington		1990-2017	KMAC
Centerburg	Trojans	Centerburg		2013-2017	KMAC
East Knox	Bulldogs	Howard		2014-2017	KMAC
Elgin	Comets	Marion (Big Island Twp,)		1990-2017	NWCC
Fredericktown	Freddies	Fredericktown		2013-2017	KMAC
Mount Gilead	Indians	Mount Gilead		1990-2017	KMAC
Northmor	Golden Knights	Galion (North Bloomfield Twp.)		1990-2017	KMAC
North Union	Wildcats	Richwood		1990-2018	CBC
Buckeye Valley	Barons	Delaware (Troy Twp.)		1990-2019	MSL

== History ==
The MOAC was established in time for the 1990-91 school year. The divisions were created to align schools based on size, and every sport recognizes a champion for each division.

- The four Marion County schools (Elgin, Pleasant, Ridgedale, and River Valley) were members of the North Central Conference prior to joining the MOAC.
- The four Morrow County schools (Cardington-Lincoln, Highland, Mount Gilead and Northmor) were members of the now-defunct Mid-Ohio Conference before agreeing to join the MOAC.
- Buckeye Valley (Delaware Co.) and North Union (Union Co.) were members of the now-defunct Central Buckeye League before joining the MOAC.

In April 2011, the league considered expanding up to six members. Four of the schools considered were from the Mid-Buckeye Conference: Centerburg, Danville, East Knox, and Fredericktown; the other two schools mentioned were Fairbanks and Marion Harding.

In May 2011, the league received formal applications from seven schools. These included Centerburg, Danville, East Knox, and Fredericktown from the Mid-Buckeye Conference; Marion Harding from the Greater Buckeye Conference; Fairbanks from the Northwest Central Conference; and Jonathan Alder, which was an independent. Four invitations were extended only to Centerburg, Fredericktown, Fairbanks, and Jonathan Alder. By June 2, all four schools had verbally agreed to join the league for the 2013-14 school year.

On December 1, 2011, Ridgedale announced it would leave the MOAC to help form the new Northern 10 Athletic Conference in 2014 with members from the North Central Conference and the Midland Athletic League.

Both Upper Sandusky and Galion were invited to join the league in early 2012 as Red Division members, with both expected to replace Ridgedale and join in 2014. However, in June 2013, Upper Sandusky took advantage of an opening in the N10 and joined that league in all sports except football for 2014. The Upper Sandusky Rams played football as a MOAC school for 2014 only before fully joining the N10. East Knox accepted the offer to be the eighth member of the Blue Division for 2014.

On August 5, 2013, Marion Harding was extended an invitation to replace Upper Sandusky in 2015-16 pending a vote of approval from Harding's school board. On August 20, 2013, the league announced Marion Harding had accepted the offer to join. Eventually, Marion Harding's membership was moved up to joining during the 2014-15 school year as Upper Sandusky competed in the MOAC for football only in 2014.

When all of the new members joined by 2014, the league continued to be split into divisions of Red and Blue.

In April 2015, Fairbanks announced that they would be leaving the MOAC to join the Ohio Heritage Conference, along with independent Madison Plains. They plan to begin play in the 2016-2017 school year.

In November 2015, seven schools from the Blue Division (Cardington, Centerburg, East Knox, Fredericktown, Highland, Mount Gilead, and Northmor) announced that they would withdraw from the MOAC to form a new league with Danville of the MBC. This new league would later be branded the Knox Morrow Athletic Conference. The KMAC began league play in the fall of 2017.

Likely due to the Blue Division's demise, Elgin and the Northwest Central Conference announced in December 2015 that the Comets would join the NWCC in 2017-18 as a full-member.

In February 2016, Jonathan Alder announced they would be leaving the MOAC for the Central Buckeye Conference in 2017-18.

In March 2016, Ontario announced that they would join the MOAC in 2017-18 when the Northern Ohio League disbands. Clear Fork is also joining at the same time as they were voted out of the Ohio Cardinal Conference following the 2017-18 school year.

In July 2017, North Union announced they would be leaving the MOAC for the Central Buckeye Conference. This prompted the league to invite Shelby as a replacement, which their school board accepted. North Union remained in the MOAC for football in 2018, but switched to the CBC in all other sports for the 2018-2019 year. Shelby did the same staying in the SBC for football in 2018, but switched to the MOAC in all other sports for the 2018-2019 year which means Shelby only spent one year in the Sandusky Bay Conference and only two for football.

In February 2018, Buckeye Valley announced they would be leaving the MOAC for the Mid-State League Ohio Division. The league invited Highland to fill the spot but they declined at first. They were invited again in January 2020, and this time their school board accepted their invitation on March 18, 2020. The Scots began league play in the 2021-22 school year in all sports but football with football beginning in the fall of 2022.

== League champions ==
The MOAC supports 12 league sports for both male and female competition. This includes football, boys' and girls' basketball, boys' and girls' track & field, boys' and girls' cross country, baseball, softball, volleyball, wrestling, and golf.

== Football Championships ==
=== By Year ===
Year	Champions	
Year	Blue Division	Red Division
1990	Cardington-Lincoln	Elgin
1991	Pleasant	Elgin
1992	Pleasant	Buckeye Valley; Elgin; River Valley
1993	Pleasant	Elgin
1994	Mount Gilead	Buckeye Valley; River Valley
1995	Pleasant	Buckeye Valley
1996	Pleasant	Buckeye Valley; Elgin; River Valley
1997	Pleasant	Buckeye Valley
1998	Pleasant	North Union
1999	Pleasant	Elgin
2000	Pleasant	Elgin; River Valley
2001	Pleasant	River Valley
2002	Pleasant	River Valley
2003	Pleasant	Elgin
2004	Pleasant	Highland
2005	Pleasant	Elgin
2006	Pleasant	Highland
2007	Pleasant	Highland
2008	Pleasant	Buckeye Valley
2009	Pleasant	North Union
2010	Pleasant	North Union
2011	Pleasant	North Union
2012	Pleasant	North Union
2013	Centerburg	River Valley
2014	Fredericktown	Pleasant
2015	Highland; Fredericktown	Jonathan Alder
2016	Highland	Jonathan Alder
Became One Division
2017	Clear Fork	
2018	Clear Fork	
2019	Shelby	
2020	Shelby	
2021	Shelby	
2022	Clear Fork	
2023	Ontario, Shelby	
