= Ridgedale High School =

Ridgedale Junior/Senior High School

Location
- 3165 Hillman-Ford Rd. Morral, (Marion County), Ohio 43337; United States
- Coordinates: 40°38′57″N 83°10′28″W

Information
- Type: Public, coeducational high school
- Established: 1976
- School district: Ridgedale Local School District
- Superintendent: Erika Bower
- CEEB code: 363510
- President: Eric Park
- Principal: Jacob Neutzling
- Assistant principal: Emily Yaksic
- Teaching staff: 24.89 (FTE)
- Grades: 6-12
- Student to teacher ratio: 12.25
- Colors: Columbia blue, red
- Athletics conference: Northwest Central Conference
- Team name: Rockets
- Website: Ridgedale Jr./Sr. High School

Ridgedale Junior/Senior High School is a public high school in Morral, Ohio, United States. It is the only high school in the Ridgedale Local School District. In 2022, its average class size was 45 students.

== Demographics ==
The Ohio Department of Education classifies the school district as "rural; high student poverty; small student population." 47% of students are reported to live in poverty.

95% of Ridgedale High School students identify as White.

== Academics ==
In order to graduate, students must obtain 21 credits by the end of their senior year. This includes 4 credits of English, 4 credits of mathematics, 3 credits of science, 3 credits of social studies, a half-credit of health, and a half-credit of physical education.

To graduate with honors, students are required to complete all but one of the following requirements:

- 4 credits of English
- 4 credits of mathematics (Algebra I, Geometry, Algebra II, and a higher-level course)
- 4 credits of science (including physics and chemistry)
- 4 credits of social studies
- 3 credits of foreign language
- 1 credit of fine arts
- 3.5 grade-point average on a 4.0 scale
- Score of 27 on the ACT or a 1210 on the SAT

Students can receive credit for classes taken at Tri-Rivers Career Center or Ohio colleges through the state's College Credit Plus program. Students in grades 11 and 12 have the option to transfer full-time to Tri-Rivers Career Center, which significantly decreases the junior and senior class sizes at Ridgedale.

== Activities ==
The team nickname is the Rockets. When Ridgedale was a member of the Mid-Ohio Athletic Conference, they had a long-standing rivalry with the Pleasant Spartans. Competitions between the two schools often became heated.

=== Athletics ===
Ridgedale High School voted to join the Northwest Central Conference in 2021. Ridgedale High School previously competed as a charter member of the Northern 10 Athletic Conference, which was formed for the 2014–15 school year. Ridgedale had previously competed as a charter member of the Mid-Ohio Athletic Conference (MOAC), which was established in 1990. Prior to the MOAC, Ridgedale competed as a charter member of the North Central Conference, beginning in 1962.

Sport	MOAC championships (1990-2014)	N10 championships (2014-2021)	NWCC championships (2021-)
Baseball	'92		
Boys' basketball	'90 '91 '92 '99 '00 '01 '06 '07		
Boys' bowling	'12	N/A	N/A
Boys' cross country	'02 '03		
Boys' golf	'93 '94 '95 '99 '00 '02	'17	
Boys' track	'97 '99 '07 '09		
Girls' basketball	'93 '94 '95 '96 '97 '98 '99 '00 '01 '02 '03 '10 '11 '12 '13		'22
Softball	'96 '97 '98 '99		
Volleyball	'97 '98 '99 '00 '01		'21

Year	Sport	Team achievement
2006	Basketball	Div 4 - District Champions
2001	Basketball	Div 3 - Regional Runner-up
1992	Baseball	Div 4 - State Champions
1998	Baseball	Div 4 - District Champions
1999	Baseball	Div 4 - State Runner Up
2000	Baseball	Div 4 - District Champions
1999	Football	Div 6 - Sweet Sixteen
2000	Football	Div 5 - Sweet Sixteen
2002	Football	Div 5 - Sweet Sixteen
2003	Football	Div 5 - Sweet Sixteen
2004	Girls' basketball	Div 4 - Regional Runner Up
2005	Girls' basketball	Div 4 - District Runner Up
2002	Volleyball	Div 3 - District Runner Up

=== Ohio High School Athletic Association state championships ===
- Boys' baseball – 1992

=== Extracurriculars ===
- Student Council
- Marching Band
- Pep Band
- Jazz Band
- Choir
- Spring Musical
- Cheerleading
- Yearbook Club
- Fellowship of Christian Athletes
- Teen Institute
- LEO Club
- National Honor Society
- Robotics Club
- Art Club
- Spanish Club
- FFA

== Administration ==
=== Board of education ===
- Eric Park
- Angela Burns
- Andy Rickets
- Ryan Cook
- Ed Roush

=== Superintendent ===
- Dr. Erika Bower

=== Treasurer ===
- Jason Fleming
