= Tri-Rivers Career Center and Center for Adult Education =

Coordinates: 40°34′59″N 83°04′13″W

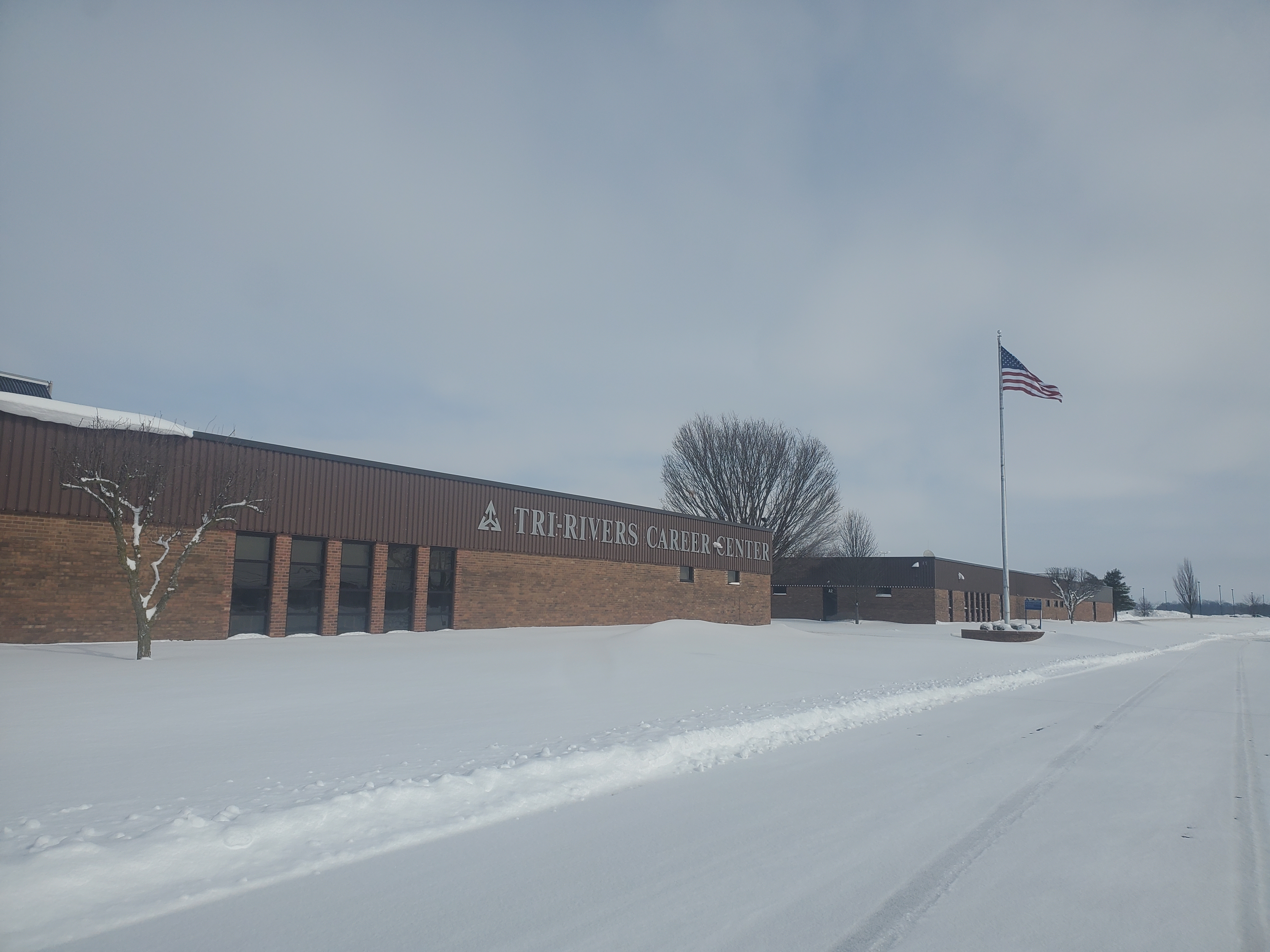
Tri-Rivers Career Center and Center for Adult Education

Tri-Rivers Career Center and Center for Adult Education is a public vocational school that provides career-technical training to high school students and adults in north-central Ohio. The high school students come from schools in Marion, Morrow and Union counties. The Adult Education Center has become a regional campus that partners with area businesses to provide lifelong, continuous training programs in computer, health, industrial and public safety fields.

== History ==
Dr. Robert Burton was hired to spearhead the funding effort for a proposed vocational school district in 1972. Originally called GATEWAY, the proposed district would have included all of Crawford, Morrow, Wyandot, Marion and Delaware counties. After an unsuccessful levy effort, the proposed size was revised and Crawford and Delaware counties, along with the Northmor District of Morrow County, were dropped.

A.O. Gross, Marion County Superintendent of Schools, served as an interim acting superintendent to head up a levy campaign featuring the revised district. Voters approved this levy in 1974. As part of the revised planning, Crawford and Delaware counties, along with the Northmor district in Morrow County, were removed from the vocational district. Construction began shortly after the levy approval, and the doors to Tri-Rivers opened in August 1976.

Charles Giauque, who was the County Superintendent for Knox County, was hired as the first Superintendent of the newly created district.

Upper Sandusky was also assigned by the State School Board to be part of the district. In addition, students from Carey attended through tuition payments in the early years. Eventually, they became part of another district.

Giauque served as superintendent until his retirement in 1983. Dr. Robert Ludwig was hired and served until 1988 when Jim Craycraft began his tenure. Mr. Craycraft retired in 2002 and was replaced by Dr. Charles Barr, superintendent of Wynford Local Schools. Dr. Barr retired in 2007. Chuck Speelman, former superintendent for Shelby Schools is the current superintendent.

In 1985, a change in focus was recognized when the name of the facility was changed to Tri-Rivers Career Center and Tri-Rivers Center for Adult Education. This change was made to reflect the emphasis on career preparation for high school as well as adult students.

=== Name ===
The name “Tri-Rivers” originated from the three rivers within the district: the Scioto, Sandusky and Olentangy.

The logo featuring three incoming white arrows intertwined with three outgoing blue arrows symbolizes the incoming untrained students and outgoing skilled employees.

The Adult Center was the first Career Center in Ohio and possibly the nation, to offer an LPN to RN Transitions program.

Tri-Rivers’ flag features interconnecting circles to indicate the collaboration needed to meet the goals of the entire Career Center. The triangular loop represents the three rivers, three counties in the district, and the three components of its programming: adult, secondary and community center. The 10 stars represent the 10 associate schools of the district. The seven circles represent the major groups of people who work together to make Tri-Rivers function: students (adult and secondary), alumni, staff (including school board members), parents and families, advisory committee members, agencies and community organizations, and business/industry.

== Academics ==
The two-year career-technical high school serves 10th (sophomore exploration program), 11th and 12th grade students from nine associate school districts:

- Cardington-Lincoln Local Schools
- Elgin Local Schools
- Highland Local School District
- Marion City School District
- Mount Gilead Exempted Village Schools
- North Union Local School District
- Pleasant Local School District
- Ridgedale Local School District
- River Valley Local School District

Students have the opportunity to choose from a variety of specific career-technical and college tech prep career programs for their focus of study.

The school also has a full range of academic courses both in the classroom and on-line. There are also electives and physical education credits.

== Campus ==
Tri-Rivers Career Center is located in Marion, OH at 2222 Marion-Mt. Gilead Rd. (S.R. 95) It is just east of S. R. 23.
