= AJ Blubaugh =

American baseball player (born 2000)

Houston Astros – No. 69
- Pitcher
- Born: July 4, 2000 (age 26); Mansfield, Ohio, U.S.
- Bats: Right Throws: Right

MLB debut
- April 30, 2025, for the Houston Astros

MLB statistics (through 2026 season)
- Win–loss record: 8–4
- Earned run average: 3.16
- Strikeouts: 129
- Stats at Baseball Reference

Teams
- Houston Astros (2025–present)

Alan Joseph Blubaugh (born July 4, 2000) is an American professional baseball pitcher for the Houston Astros of Major League Baseball (MLB). He made his MLB debut in 2025.

== Career ==
=== Amateur career ===
Blubaugh attended Clear Fork High School in Bellville, Ohio, and played college baseball at the University of Wisconsin-Milwaukee. In 2022, he played collegiate summer baseball with the Orleans Firebirds of the Cape Cod Baseball League.

=== Professional career ===
Blubaugh was drafted by the Houston Astros in the seventh round, with the 223rd overall selection, of the 2022 Major League Baseball draft.

Blubaugh spent his first professional season with the rookie-level Florida Complex League Astros and Single-A Fayetteville Woodpeckers. He started 2023 with the High-A Asheville Tourists before his promotion to the Double-A Corpus Christi Hooks. After the season, Blubaugh pitched in the Arizona Fall League. He split the 2024 season between Corpus Christi and the Triple-A Sugar Land Space Cowboys, accumulating a combined 12–4 record and 3.71 ERA with 133 strikeouts across 128 2/3 innings pitched.

On April 30, 2025, Blubaugh was selected to the 40-man roster and promoted to the major leagues for the first time. He made his Major League debut that day against the Detroit Tigers. Blubaugh pitched four innings, allowing five hits and two runs while walking a batter, and struck out six batters in his debut. On August 5, Blubaugh recorded his first career win after allowing two runs in five innings of relief against the Miami Marlins. In 2025, Blubaugh appeared in 11 games with a 3–1 record with a 1.69 ERA.

In 2026, Blubaugh ranked first in the major leagues among relievers in innings pitched (96), and sixth in the American League (AL) in strikeouts (94). He appeared in 64 games, went 5–3, and yielded a 1.229 walks plus hits per inning pitched (WHIP). Following the 2026 season, Blubaugh was conferred as team Rookie of the Year by the Houston chapter of the Baseball Writers' Association of America (BBWAA).
