= CFHS =

CFHS as an acronym can refer to the following:

High Schools:

- Camden Fairview High School — a high school in Ouachita County, Arkansas
- Cape Fear High School — a high school in Fayetteville, North Carolina
- Carolina Forest High School — a high school in Horry County, South Carolina
- Catalina Foothills High School — a high school in Tucson, Arizona
- Cedar Falls High School — a high school in Cedar Falls, Iowa
- Central Falls High School — a high school in Central Falls, Rhode Island
- Chagrin Falls High School — a high school in Chagrin Falls, Ohio
- Chippewa Falls High School — a high school in Chippewa Falls, Wisconsin
- Colonial Forge High School — a high school in Stafford, Virginia
- Copley Fairlawn High School*
- Columbia Falls High School — a high school in Columbia Falls, Montana
- Cuyahoga Falls High School — a high school in Cuyahoga Falls, Ohio
- Cypress Falls High School — a high school near Houston, Texas
- Chenango Forks High School a high school in Binghamton, New York
- Clear Fork High School — a high school in between Bellville and Butler, Ohio
- Clear Falls High School — a high school near Houston, Texas

Societies:

- Canadian Federation of Humane Societies
- Conservatives for Higher Standards — a project of the Foundation for Excellence in Education and the Thomas B. Fordham Institute

Sometimes CFHS can be short for Coffeehouse
