= Brush Ridge, Ohio =

- Unincorporated community
- Location within Ohio Location within the United States
- Coordinates: 40°41′15″N 83°09′13″W
- Country: United States
- State: Ohio
- Counties: Marion
- Township: Grand Prairie
- Elevation: 951 ft (290 m)
- Time zone: UTC-5 (Eastern (EST))
  - Summer (DST): UTC-4 (EDT)
- ZIP Code: 43302 (Marion)
- Area code: 740
- GNIS feature ID: 1056734

Brush Ridge is an unincorporated community in Grand Prairie Township, Marion County, Ohio, United States. Brush Ridge is served by Ridgedale Local School District.

== History ==
Brush Ridge was one of the first communities in Marion County, and at one time the largest community in Grand Prairie Township, the Free-Will Baptist Church (now Grand Prairie Baptist Church) was built here in 1867. In 1900, the "Brush Ridge Horse Protecting Company of Marion and Wyandot Counties" was established here. In 1907, when the community was suddenly overrun by rats, a rather famous six-week-long rat hunt was held, with a total of 6,600 rats having been killed.

== Geography ==
Brush Ridge is located north of Marion and east of Morral at the interchange of U.S. Route 23 and Ohio State Routes 231 and 423.

The Little Sandusky River begins near Brush Ridge.
