= River Valley High School (Caledonia, Ohio) =

Location
- 4280 Marion-Mt. Gilead Rd. Caledonia, Ohio 43314; United States; 40°35′05″N 83°00′49″W

Information
- Type: Public high school
- Established: 1964
- School district: River Valley Local School District
- Grades: 9 to 12
- Enrollment: 467
- Colors: Columbia blue and gold
- Athletics conference: Mid-Ohio Athletic Conference
- Mascot: Viking
- Website: School Website

River Valley High School is a public high school in Caledonia, Ohio. It is the only high school in the River Valley Local School District. In the fall of 2003, a new campus was opened for students due to the possibility of cancer-causing chemicals on the old campus.

== Statistics and schedules ==
The school has 467 students in grades 9 through 12. The school operates on a 10-period schedule. River Valley does not have midterms as a whole student body, like other schools around the state, but individual classes have their own midterms scheduled.

They have two Elementary Schools, Liberty Elementary School and Heritage Elementary School, and a middle school.

== Academics ==
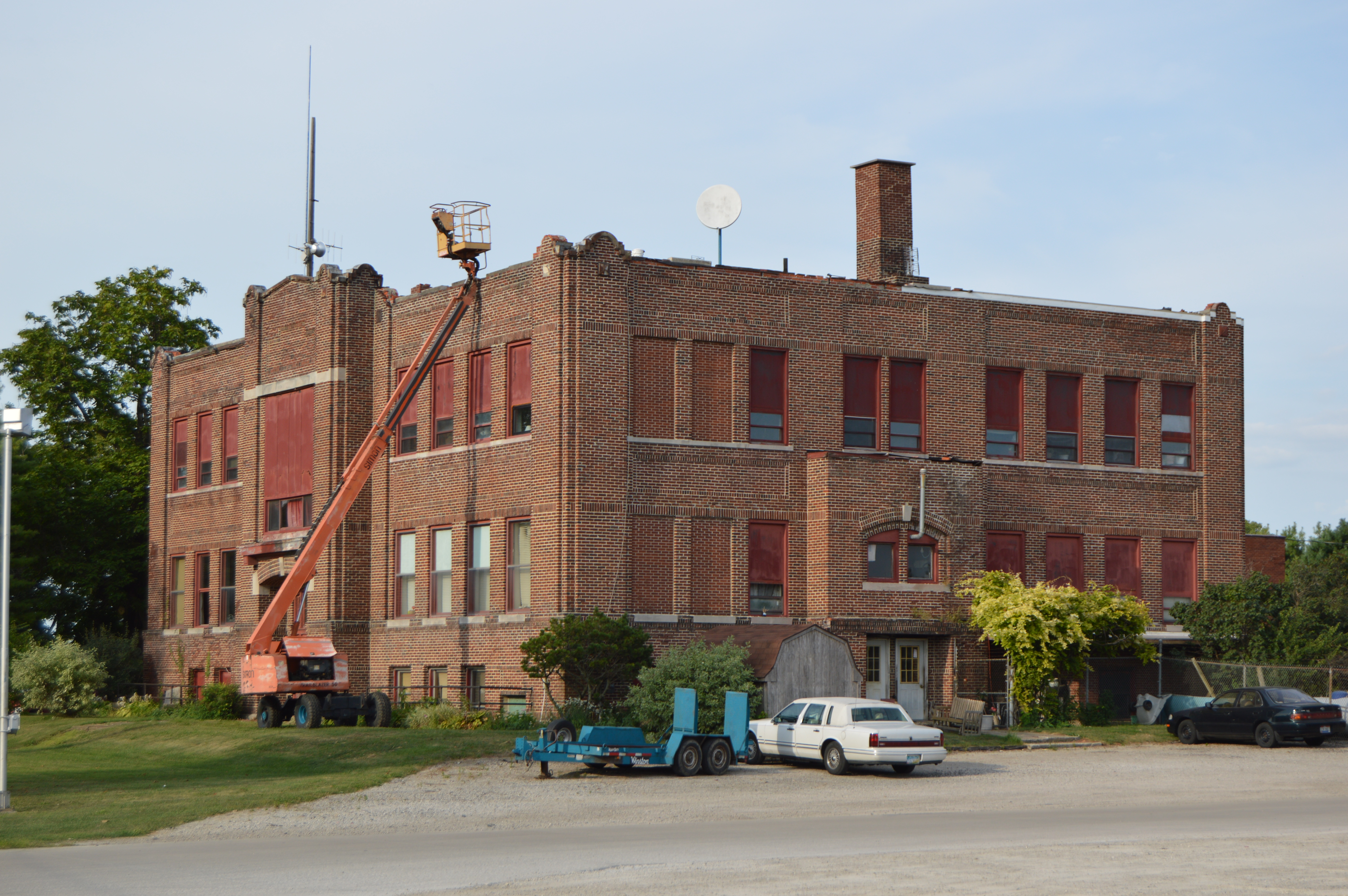
Former high school at Martel, now consolidated into River Valley

In order to graduate, students must obtain 21 credits by the end of their senior year. They are required 4 credits of English, 4 credits of mathematics, 3 credits of science, 3 credits of history (often referred to as social studies), a half-credit of health, a half-credit of physical education (which is two .25 credit hour classes), and a half-credit of Life Planning (all seniors are required to take this class except those who take at least 3 years of Agricultural Science).

Students planning on going to college after graduation are highly encouraged to take 4 credits of English (with emphasis on composition), 3 credits of mathematics (Algebra I, Geometry, Algebra II), 3 credits of science (including Physical Science, Biology and Chemistry), 3 credits of history, 2 credits of foreign language (some schools now recommend 3), and one credit of art.

River Valley does have a long list of academic classes offered regularly, including Advanced Placement courses that allow obtaining of college credit by taking a test at the end of the school year, and are a weighted grade for your high school GPA. They also offer extra core academic classes, such as Physics, Anatomy and Physiology, Pre-Calculus, and Calculus, for those who wish to have a more rigorous schedule or to explore an area of academics further. Until the 2005 school year, River Valley also offered 3 foreign languages (Spanish, French and German) but had to drop German due to financial difficulties. In 2010 they dropped French, also due to financial difficulties.

== Cancer scare ==
Several families raised concerns about the number of leukemia cases among River Valley High School (RVS) graduates: as of April 11, 1999, there were 94 cases in a population of about 35,000. These families formed a parent group called the Concerned River Valley Families. In August 1997, the Ohio Environmental Protection Agency (EPA) and Ohio Department of Health (ODH) conducted an initial environmental site assessment of the RVS campus. Based on these assessments, a determination was made that the campus was located on a formerly used defense site (FUDS) known as Marion Engineering Depot (MED). The site was used for storing, maintaining and renovating heavy construction machinery for the U.S. Army from 1942 until 1962. Congress established the Defense Environmental Restoration Program/Formerly Used Defense Site (DERP/FUDS) program to clean up properties that were under the jurisdiction of the Secretary and owned, leased, or possessed by the United States and transferred from Department of Defense (DoD) control prior to October 17, 1986. The U.S. Army Corps of Engineers (USACE) manages the FUDS program.

In December 2000, a Memorandum of Understanding and a Cooperative Agreement was signed by the Department of Army, River Valley Schools and State of Ohio to share in the costs of relocating the River Valley Middle and High School campus. As a result of this Cooperative Agreement, the schools were relocated in the fall 2003. An ODH study released in 2001 concluded that continued study of leukemia among Marion County residents and RVS graduates would be unlikely to identify additional factors explaining the disease's incidence in these populations.

== Athletics ==
- Wrestling
- Football
- Basketball
- Baseball
- Softball
- Tennis
- Soccer
- Track & Field
- Cross Country
- Volleyball
- Golf
- Bowling
- Swimming
- Cheerleading

=== Ohio High School Athletic Association State Championships ===
- Boys' Cross Country – 1966

=== Ohio High School Athletic Association District Championships ===
- Boys' Basketball - 2006-07

=== Extracurriculars ===
- Industrial Tech Club
- FFA
- Marching Band
- Concert Band
- Jazz Band
- Orchestra
1. Rock Orchestra
2. Fab Four String Quartet
3. River Valley Baroque Chamber Orchestra
- Show Choir
1. Music Company (Mixed SATB)
- Academic Challenge Team
- Musical
- National Honor Society

== Other schools in the district ==
- Heritage Elementary School
- Liberty Elementary School
- River Valley Middle School

== Notable alumni ==
- Michael J. McCord - Comptroller of the Department of Defense in the Biden administration and Obama administration
- Julie A. Kientz - computer scientist and full professor at the University of Washington
- Shawn Grate - convicted serial killer
