= Meeker, Ohio =

Unincorporated community in Ohio, U.S.

Coordinates: 40°38′37″N 83°18′21″W

Meeker is an unincorporated community in Marion County, in the U.S. state of Ohio. Meeker is served by Ridgedale Local School District.

== History ==
A former variant name was Scott Town, and the post office was first called Cochranton, after Col. William Cochran, the original owner of the town site. A post office called Cochranton was established July 15, 1829, the name was changed to Meeker December 9, 1908, and the post office closed May 15, 1943. The present name was adopted in honor of one Mr. Meeker, the treasurer of a local railroad project.
