= Clear Fork Valley Local School District =

School district in Ohio

Clear Fork Valley Local School District is a public school district serving students in the villages of Bellville and Butler, most of Jefferson Township and Worthington Township, eastern parts of Perry Township, and southern parts of Washington Township in southern Richland County, Ohio, United States. Also the school district extends into northern parts of Pike Township in Knox County. The school district enrolls 1,865 students as of the 2007–2008 academic year.

== Schools ==
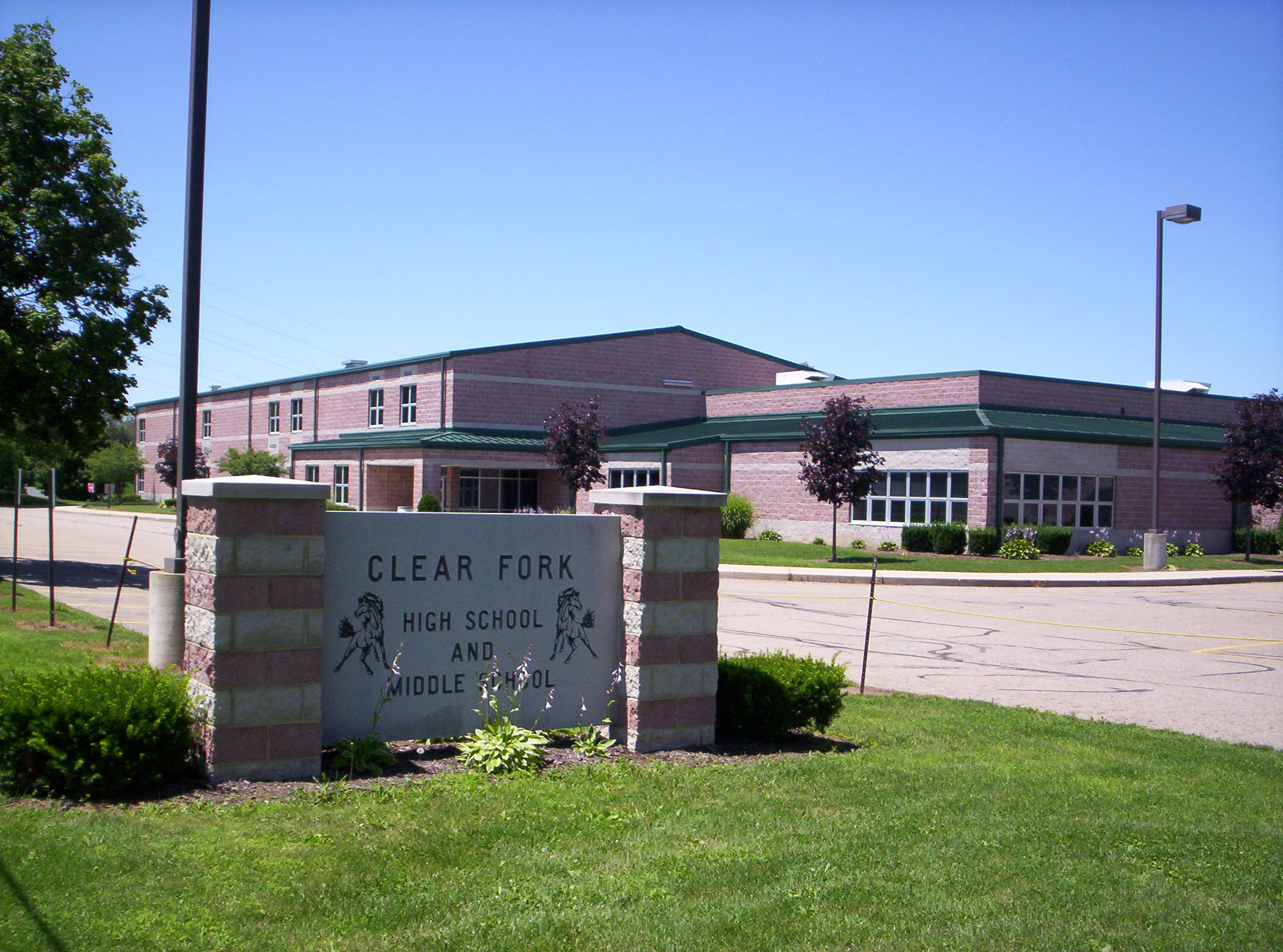
Clear Fork High School and Middle School.

=== Elementary schools ===
- Bellville Elementary School (Grades K through 5th)
- Butler Elementary School (Grades K through 5th)

=== Middle schools ===
- Clear Fork Middle School (Grades 6th through 8th)

=== High schools ===
- Clear Fork High School (Grades 9th through 12th)
