= Buckeye Valley Local School District =

School district in Ohio

Coordinates: 40°21′N 83°5′W

Location
- Delaware, Ohio; United States

District information
- Type: Public School
- Established: 1963

Students and staff
- District mascot: Fighting Baron
- Colors: Brown and Gold

Other information
- Website: https://www.mybvls.org

The Buckeye Valley Local School District is located in Delaware, Ohio and is made up primarily of students from the Ashley and Ostrander areas. The district currently consists of two elementary schools (East in Ashley, West in Ostrander), one middle school and one high school (both in Troy Twp.) The school's colors are brown and gold and their mascot is the Fighting Barons.

== History ==
The Buckeye Valley Local School District was established in 1961 as a merger of the former Elm Valley (Ashley & Kilbourne/Brown High School), Scioto Valley (Ostrander, Bellpoint, and Warrensburg) and Radnor school districts. The State of Ohio was going to revoke the charter for the Radnor and Elm Valley districts due to the lack of facilities for high school students. While the Radnor district was looking to merge with schools in Marion County (Prospect and Waldo) and Elm Valley was in discussions to merge with Marengo schools in Morrow County, the Delaware County School board and county commissioners forced a merger of Scioto Valley, Elm Valley, and Radnor as to keep all these students going to school in Delaware County The nickname of Barons was derived from names of some of the areas that were consolidated to create Buckeye Valley: Bellpoint (also perhaps Brown), Ashley, Radnor, Ostrander, Norton, Scioto. Another idea is that it is a nod to the many landowning farmers in the area. The first students to graduate from Buckeye Valley was in 1963.

== Administration ==
The Buckeye Valley Administrative offices are located near the middle and high school buildings on Coover Road in Delaware. The "Big House", as it is called informally, houses the offices of the Superintendent, Director of Administrative Services, Director of Student Success, and the Treasurer. The Director of Pupil Services, who coordinates special education services, is currently located in the middle school's main office.

== Schools ==
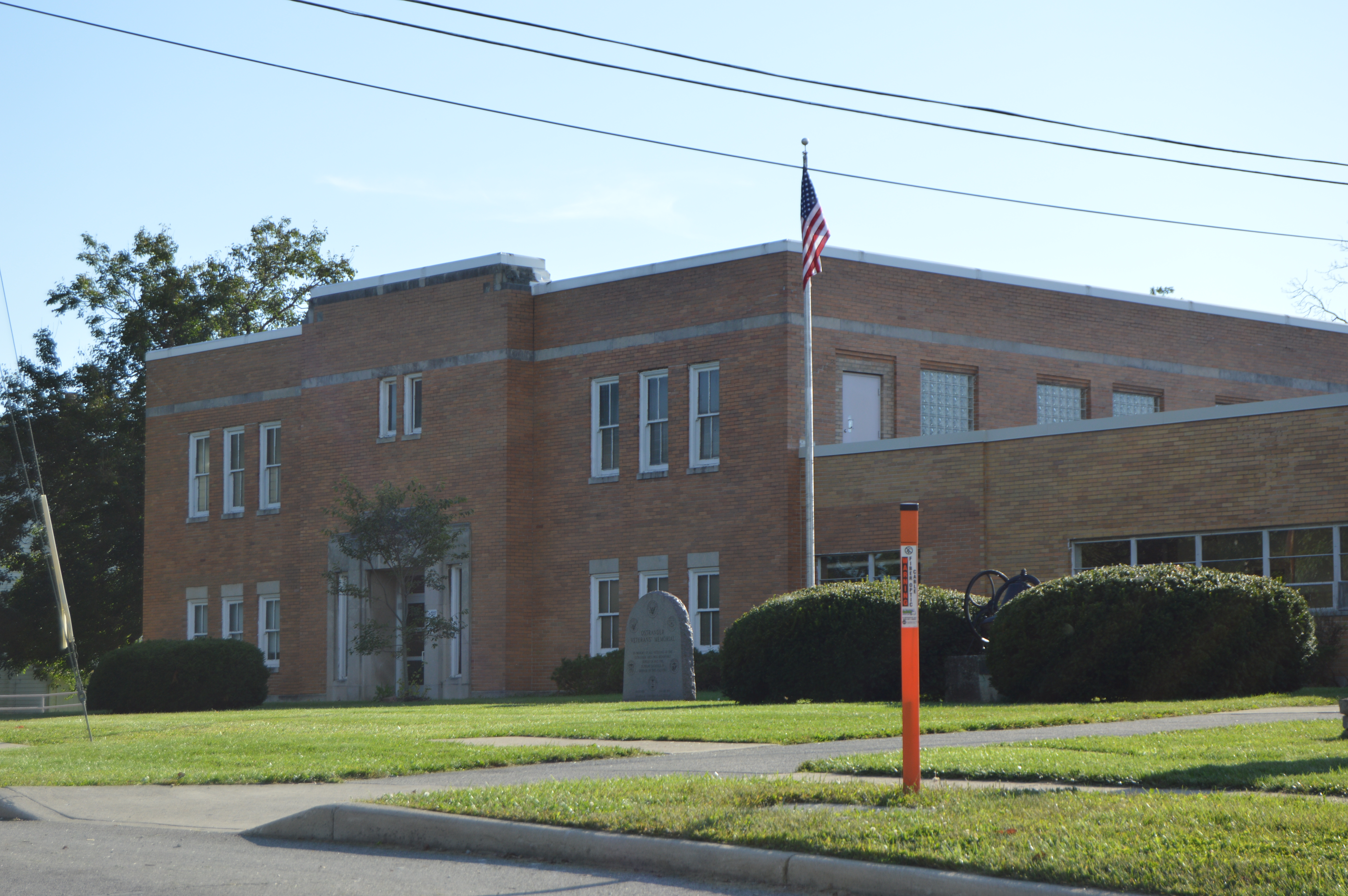
West Elementary School in Ostrander

=== Elementary ===
- Buckeye Valley East Elementary School (formerly Ashley Elementary in Ashley, Ohio).
- Buckeye Valley North Elementary School (formerly Radnor Elementary in Radnor, Ohio).
- Buckeye Valley West Elementary School (formerly Ostrander Elementary and also formerly Scioto Valley High School prior to that in Ostrander, Ohio).

Each of these elementary schools were kindergarten through 8th-grade buildings from 1963 until 1986. When the Junior High schools consolidated to form a middle school using the Radnor building, the Ashley and Ostrander buildings housed the East and West elementaries with grades kindergarten through 5th grade until the new middle school was opened in 1997. The Radnor building then became the North elementary, also housing kindergarten through 5th grade. Each elementary school has approximately 400 students.

As of the 2012–2013 school year the Radnor building has been shut down and is no longer an elementary for Buckeye Valley. (Note: the town of Kilbourne also had an elementary known as Brown Elementary, which was open from 1971 until 1986. It housed students grades kindergarten through 6th grade, which fed into Ashley Jr. High).

The Buckeye Valley West elementary school building (located in Ostrander, Ohio) is no longer in use as it was replaced by a different building (of the same name) close by in Bellepoint, Ohio.

=== Middle ===
- Buckeye Valley Middle School (located on the campus of Buckeye Valley High School).

BVMS was a consolidation of the Ostrander, Radnor, and Ashley Jr. High Schools in 1986. The original middle school was the Radnor building, located in Radnor, Ohio (then the home of North Elementary). The new middle school building was opened in 1997 and has won many design awards, including the 1998 James D. MacConnell Award for design excellence from the Council of Educational Facilities Planners International. Today it houses nearly 600 students grades 6th through 8th.

=== Secondary ===
- Buckeye Valley High School

The Buckeye Valley High School Barons was established in 1963 as a consolidation of the Elm Valley (Ashley) Aces, the Radnor (Local) Trojans, and the Scioto Valley (Ostrander) Rockets. The high school building located on Coover Road in Troy Township still exists to this day. It has had one expansion in 1997 and was added onto once again in 2010. Over the years, BVHS had around 600 students in the Sr. High school. Today it houses grades ninth through twelfth and has approximately 800 students in attendance.

In 2013 Buckeye Valley High School was ranked #100 in the state of Ohio (out of 892 high schools operating in Ohio at the time) by U.S. News & World Report's 'Best High Schools' edition. Nationally it ranked #1753 and earned a silver medal.
