= Ashley, Ohio =

- Village
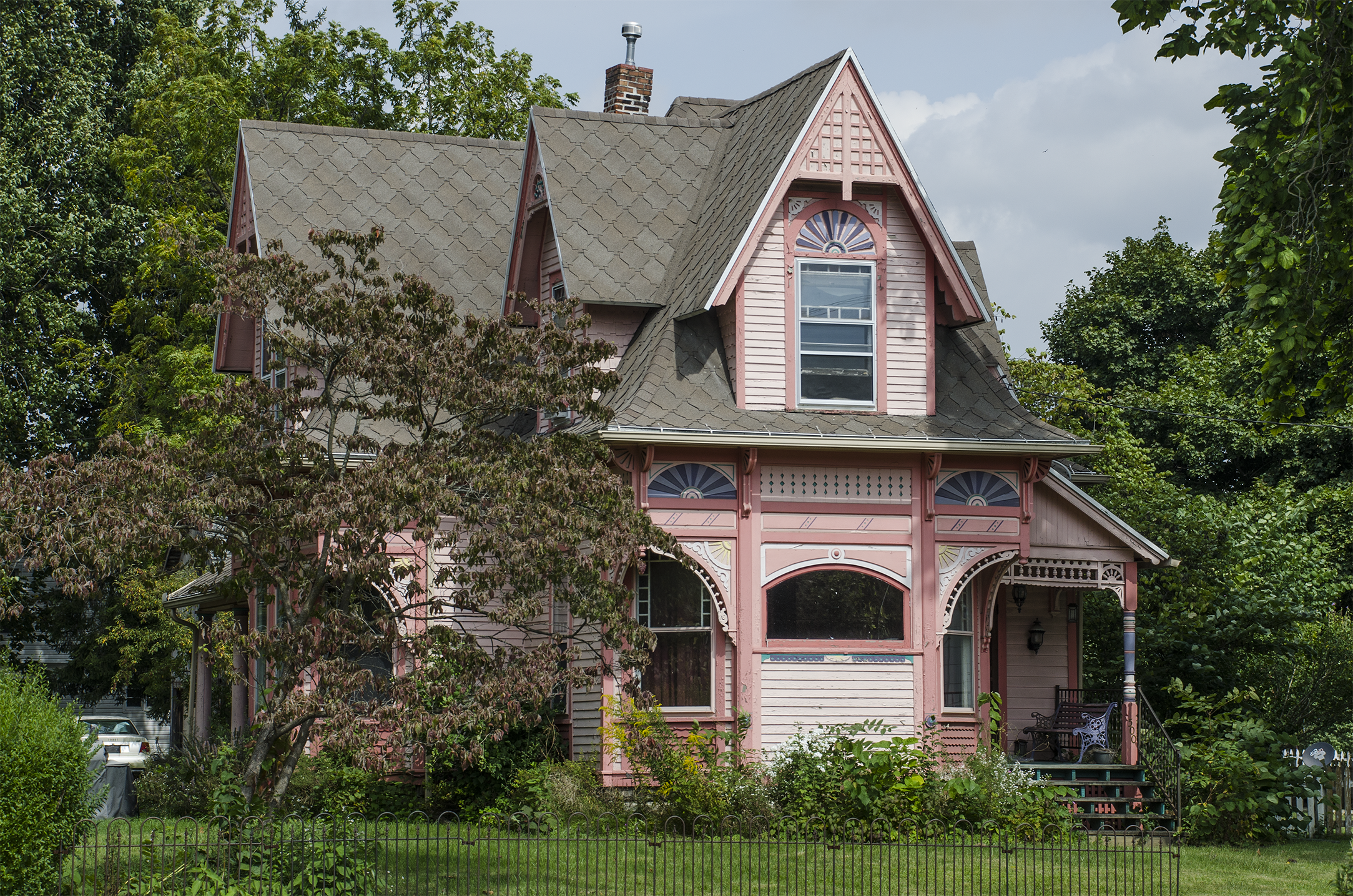
- Bartha House in Ashley, Ohio

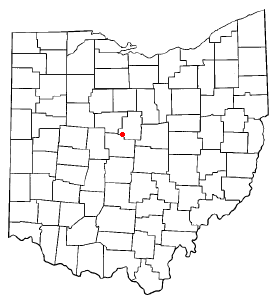
- Location of Ashley, Ohio

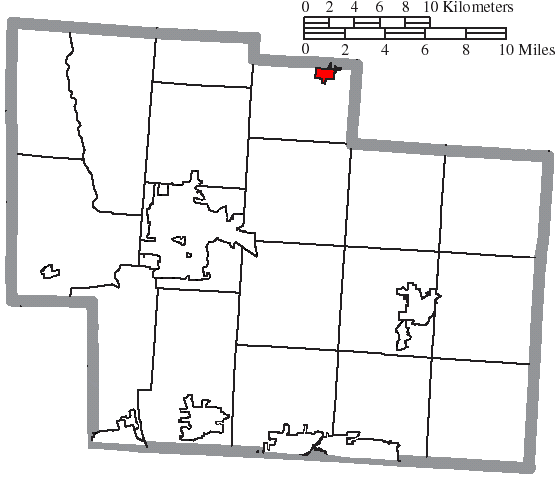
- Location of Ashley in Delaware County

- Location within Ohio Location within the United States Location within North America
- Coordinates: 40°24′35″N 82°57′06″W
- Country: United States
- State: Ohio
- County: Delaware
- Township: Oxford

Area
  - Total: 0.66 sq mi (1.71 km^{2})
  - Land: 0.66 sq mi (1.71 km^{2})
  - Water: 0 sq mi (0.00 km^{2})
- Elevation: 978 ft (298 m)

Population (2020)
  - Total: 1,198
  - Estimate (2023): 1,318
  - Density: 1,818.5/sq mi (702.12/km^{2})
- Time zone: UTC-5 (Eastern (EST))
  - Summer (DST): UTC-4 (EDT)
- ZIP code: 43003
- Area code: 740
- FIPS code: 39-02582
- GNIS feature ID: 1086041
- Website: https://www.villageofashley.org/

Ashley is a village in Delaware County, Ohio, United States. The population was 1,198 at the 2020 census.

Ashley students attend the Buckeye Valley Local School District.

== History ==
Ashley was laid out in 1849. The village takes its name from L. W. Ashley, one of the original owners of the village site.

== Geography ==
According to the United States Census Bureau, the village has a total area of 0.66 square miles (1.71 km^{2}), all land.

== Demographics ==
Historical population
Census	Pop.	Note	%±
1870	454		—
1880	483		6.4%
1890	628		30.0%
1900	700		11.5%
1910	706		0.9%
1920	786		11.3%
1930	734		−6.6%
1940	762		3.8%
1950	798		4.7%
1960	907		13.7%
1970	1,034		14.0%
1980	1,057		2.2%
1990	1,059		0.2%
2000	1,216		14.8%
2010	1,330		9.4%
2020	1,198		−9.9%
2023 (est.)	1,318	▲	10.0%
U.S. Decennial Census

=== 2010 census ===
As of the census of 2010, there were 1,330 people, 503 households, and 342 families living in the village. The population density was 2,015.2 inhabitants per square mile (778.1/km^{2}). There were 542 housing units at an average density of 821.2 per square mile (317.1/km^{2}). The racial makeup of the village was 97.2% White, 0.5% African American, 0.1% Native American, 0.2% Asian, 0.1% from other races, and 2.0% from two or more races. Hispanic or Latino people of any race were 1.5% of the population.

There were 503 households, of which 36.8% had children under the age of 18 living with them, 47.7% were married couples living together, 14.9% had a female householder with no husband present, 5.4% had a male householder with no wife present, and 32.0% were non-families. 26.8% of all households were made up of individuals, and 11.1% had someone living alone who was 65 years of age or older. The average household size was 2.62 and the average family size was 3.12.

The median age in the village was 36.3 years. 27.1% of residents were under the age of 18; 7.5% were between the ages of 18 and 24; 26.3% were from 25 to 44; 25.4% were from 45 to 64; and 13.6% were 65 years of age or older. The gender makeup of the village was 47.1% male and 52.9% female.

=== 2000 census ===
As of the census of 2000, there were 1,216 people, 469 households, and 324 families living in the village. The population density was 2,241.4 inhabitants per square mile (865.4/km^{2}). There were 500 housing units at an average density of 921.6 per square mile (355.8/km^{2}). The racial makeup of the village was 96.96% White, 0.99% African American, 0.33% Native American, 0.08% Pacific Islander, 0.25% from other races, and 1.40% from two or more races. Hispanic or Latino people of any race were 0.82% of the population.

There were 469 households, out of which 35.4% had children under the age of 18 living with them, 51.4% were married couples living together, 12.8% had a female householder with no husband present, and 30.9% were non-families. 27.3% of all households were made up of individuals, and 12.8% had someone living alone who was 65 years of age or older. The average household size was 2.57 and the average family size was 3.06.

In the village, the population was spread out, with 29.5% under the age of 18, 7.8% from 18 to 24, 31.3% from 25 to 44, 18.3% from 45 to 64, and 13.1% who were 65 years of age or older. The median age was 34 years. For every 100 females there were 90.9 males. For every 100 females age 18 and over, there were 85.1 males.

The median income for a household in the village was $38,239, and the median income for a family was $42,313. Males had a median income of $31,667 versus $25,000 for females. The per capita income for the village was $15,513. About 10.2% of families and 12.7% of the population were below the poverty line, including 13.8% of those under age 18 and 24.4% of those age 65 or over.

== Public services ==
Emergency medical services for the Village of Ashley and its surrounding area are provided by the Delaware County EMS. Fire protection services are provided by the Elm Valley Joint Fire District.
