= Duncan S. Casper =

American Mormon pioneer (1824–1898)

Duncan Spears Casper
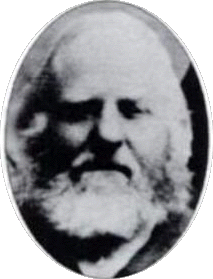
- Born: 8 December 1824; Bellville, Ohio
- Died: 20 May 1898 (aged 73); Holladay, Utah
- Spouses: Matilda Allison; Elizabeth Ann Clark

Duncan Spears Casper (December 8, 1824 – May 20, 1898) was an early Mormon pioneer and one of the first settlers of Holladay, Utah.

Casper was in Bellville, Ohio, the son of William Casper and Avarilla Durbin. His mother joined the Campbellites when he was eight years old, and a year later, after Mormon missionaries came through their area, his older brother William Wallace Casper joined the Latter Day Saint Church of Christ. Casper's parents joined two years later and in 1837 they moved the family to Missouri, where they purchased a home.

Mobs drove the Latter Day Saints from Missouri, and Casper's parents had to leave their home behind. They rented a farm near Fairfield, Illinois, then moved on to Carthage. In 1841, they moved to Nauvoo, where Casper was baptized at age 16.

In May 1845, 20-year-old Casper married 24-year-old Matilda Allison, a fellow Ohioan and a descendant of Thomas Miner. The next year, Casper and all of his brothers left Nauvoo for Missouri as mobs were preparing to drive the Latter Day Saints from Illinois. His parents stayed behind with the two unmarried children because someone had stolen his father's horses. That summer, his father fell ill and died at age 62. Casper returned to Nauvoo and brought his mother and two siblings back to Missouri, where they stayed for nine years.

In 1855, Casper crossed the plains with his wife, children, and mother in Captain Hindley's Company. In Utah Territory, they settled in Big Cottonwood (present-day Holladay), where they owned a home and land. Casper also raised stock and sheep on land he purchased in Idaho. He served as a trustee in the Big Cottonwood School District.

In 1867, Casper was called to help the struggling Muddy Mission. Due to his wife's poor health, she stayed behind and died in 1871. They had nine children together.

Casper married Elizabeth Ann Clark, English immigrant, in 1872. She had two children from a previous marriage. Casper adopted her children and the couple went on to have seven more together. Unlike some early Latter Day Saints, Casper did not practice plural marriage. He died in Holladay, Utah, and is buried there.
