= Scioto Ordnance Plant =

Coordinates: 40.640°N 83.073°W

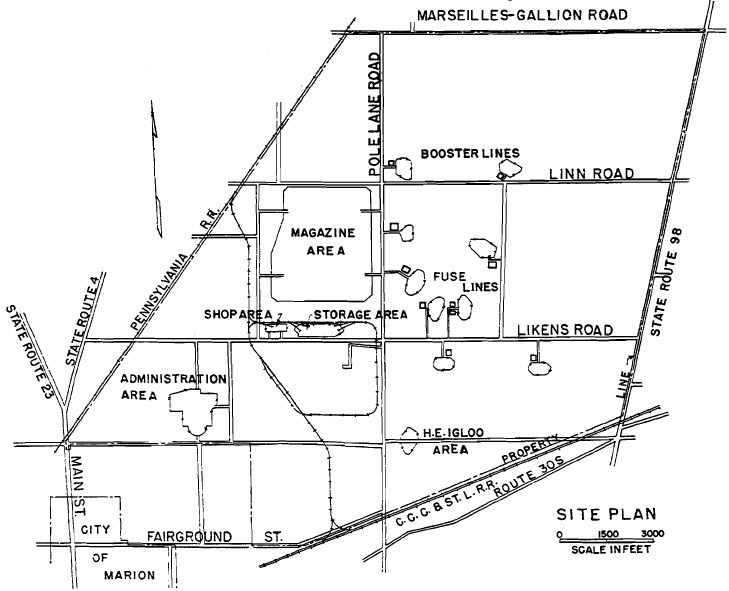
Map of former Scioto Ordnance Plant

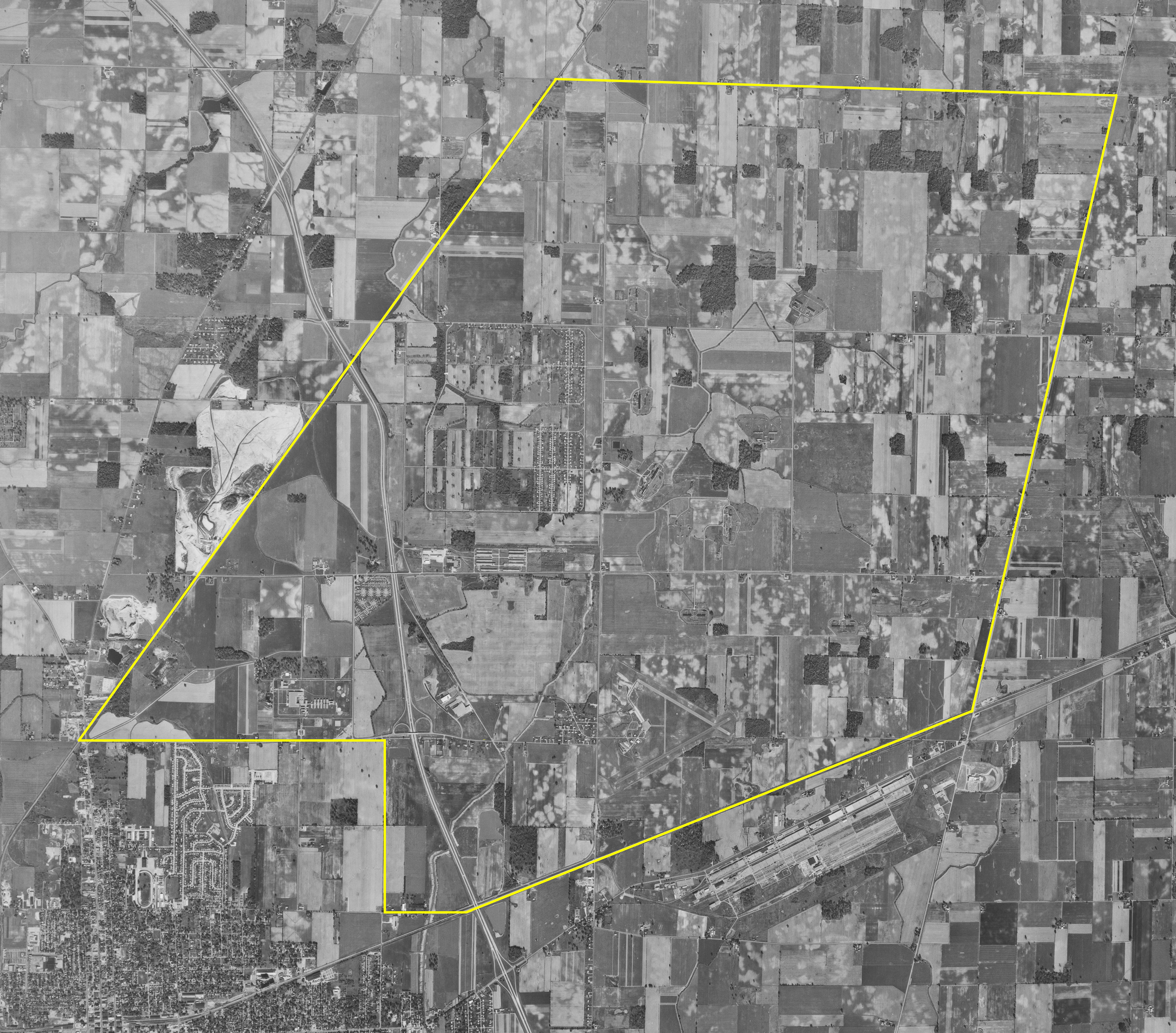
Scioto Ordnance Plant property line on 1973 air photo

The Scioto Ordnance Plant (SOP) was a munitions and incendiary bomb-making facility built in Marion County, Ohio, by the United States Army in 1942, and operated under lease by United States Rubber Company – most recently known as Uniroyal. The plant operated until 1945, when production wound down. Also built adjacent was the Marion Engineering Depot which was authorized in the summer of 1942. Land for the plant was taken in Grand Prairie, Scott, Clairdon and Marion Townships in an area covering 12,500 acres (51 km^{2}).

Families who owned property within the zone identified for the facility were notified March 1, 1942, that they had to vacate their land by May 1, 1942. Not only did this mean that the displaced had to find a place to live in the midst of a housing and fuel shortage, but it also meant moving and/or selling livestock and agricultural equipment. Federal contractors began removing field fencing in April 1942. While landowners received a "fair" valuation for their property, relocation expenses were not paid. Several property owners claimed that they never received any compensation from the government.

A rural cemetery, Likens Cemetery, which had been in use since the 1830s, was located within the takings area, south of Likens Road and west of Pole Lane Road. According to the Marion Star, April 12, 1942, the Corps of Engineers planned to exhume the three hundred graves thought to be in the cemetery and relocate those to the cemetery in Kirkpatrick, Ohio, which was the nearest cemetery to Likens. However, by mid-May, 1942, the Army and community members agreed that the cost and efforts of moving the graves were better spent on "the War Effort" and the idea dropped. Planned building activity around the cemetery was relocated to another sector, and the cemetery made accessible to family members on one day per year for the duration.

After May 1, 1942, most of the farmsteads located inside the perimeter were leveled; underground bunkers and production buildings were built in clusters throughout the SOP site. By June 1942 SOP was employing 2,900 employees, many of whom moved north from Southern Ohio and Kentucky for the high paying wages offered.

Once in operation, the plant (under the operation of U.S. Rubber) produced fuses and boosters, 20 mm bullets, 50 caliber bullets, 50 caliber artillery shells, 65 mm shells and 75 mm shells. Incendiary bombs and napalm barrel bombs, similar to those used on Dresden by Allied forces were also produced at the site. Munitions containers served dual duty by carrying SOP products overseas and then doubling as coffins for those killed in action.

German prisoners of war were housed on the site (in an area referred to as “Camp Marion”) beginning in December 1944. During the 1940s, many of the German prisoners were used as labor in the city of Marion. Local residents who were alive at the time can recall the prisoners being used for painting, maintenance, collecting trash, building improvements, etc. Although they were POWs, they were treated well and fairly by the Army.

Following the end of the war, land taken for SOP was resold to civilians. Local farmers who had lost their land had the first option to repurchase their former lands back from the government. Land that was not purchased back by displaced residents was then sold to other buyers. A housing development – Grandview – was built over the magazine area of the former plant.

In 1949, uranium handling was planned for the site, with the contract going to Monsanto Company. However, production at the facility never began in earnest.

The SOP is listed as a Formerly Used Defense Site by the United States Army Corps of Engineers (USACE).

== Post-war problems ==
In 2000 it was revealed that students attending River Valley High School (Caledonia, Ohio), built on land formerly occupied by the Marion Engineering Depot, had higher than usual instances leukemia. Tests performed on the site by the Ohio EPA and the United States Army Corps of Engineers proved inconclusive. A private consultant hired by a parent organization found evidence of toxic chemical waste on the River Valley site dating back to the 1940s. As a result, these findings, and because of Ohio EPA problems with the investigation, River Valley pursued building a new school campus and eventually abandoned the Engineering Depot Site.

Today, most of the buildings have been demolished, or are being used by the private farmers who now own the land. A few buildings are visible today and can be seen from New Road (which runs north–south parallel to Pole Lane Rd). During the 1990s, at the height of the investigation into the health issues which many residents attributed to the ordnance plant, there were rows and rows of 50-gallon drums sealed and seemingly ready for disposal located in a field a few hundred yards west of New Road. Most assumed this was waste that the Army Corps of Engineers had collected and planned to dispose of. The Likins Chapel, built-in 1919 at the intersection of Likeins Road and Pole Lane Road, escaped demolition for the facility and was used as an engineer's office. Following the war, it was used by two congregations into the 1980s, however, it fell into disuse and was destroyed by fire in 2019. At one point it was inhabited as a residence, but has been unused and abandoned for many years.

In the neighborhood of Grandview, which is north of Likens Road and west of Pole Lane Rd, there are still remnants of the plant. In some of the undeveloped areas of the neighborhood in the woods, you can still find large flat overgrown slabs of concrete platforms, large concrete sidewalks, all of which now are on private property. This can also be seen in the fields west of Pole Lane Rd. There are concrete roads that were most likely used for vehicles. The Marion International Airport is also located on Pole Lane Rd. For years many pilots had reported that during the winter as they flew over the area they could see a large square patch of land where the snow would melt in an exact square, while the rest of the land surrounded it remained covered in snow. It was later discovered that this area of land was where the Army had dug and buried chemicals used in ammunition production (phosphorus etc.), and as the chemicals mixed with the oxygen in the ground it would melt the snow that settled on it. Directly across the road from the church at Pole Land and Likens is a crumbled concrete platform. It is roughly 12' square, and all that is left is about 2' high of concrete and several pieces of steel rusted re-bar.

Most of the physical history of this area of Marion is gone, except a few buildings, and the Marion Depot located on Rt 309, which still houses an Army station and a train loading-unloading station (the Army reserve HQ previously located at the corner of Pole Lane Rd and Rt 309 has subsequently closed also). The memories of the history of this area still live strong considering this has been a part of history in Marion, Ohio, for nearly 70 years.

== Photographs from 1945 ==
All photos are from the Archives Search Report by the United States Army Corps of Engineers.

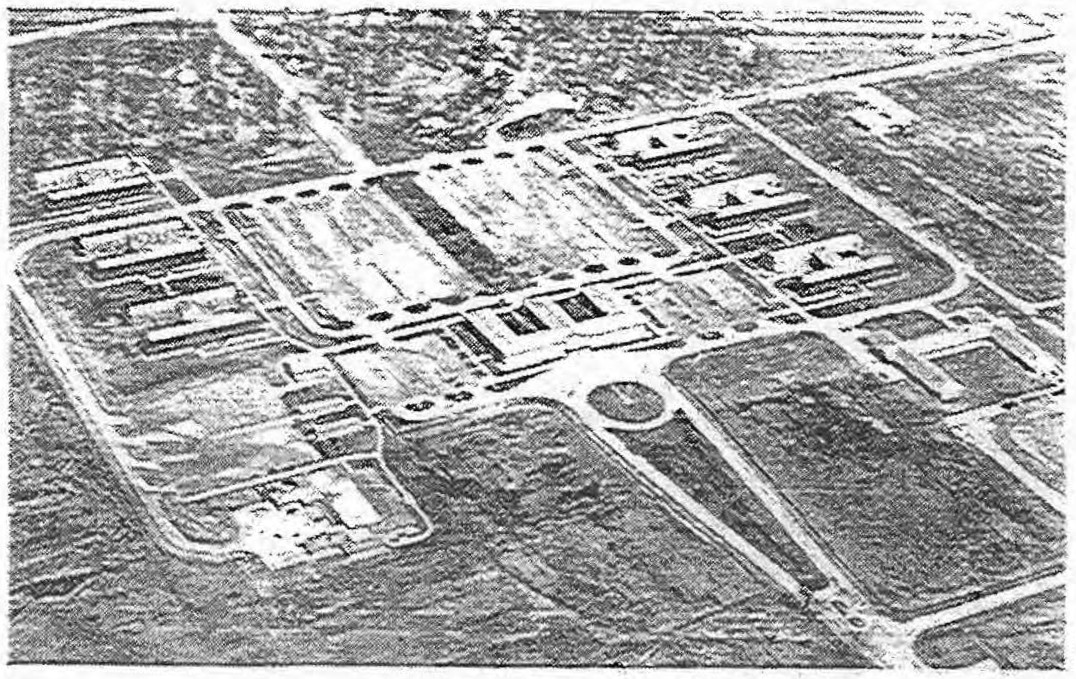
Administration Area

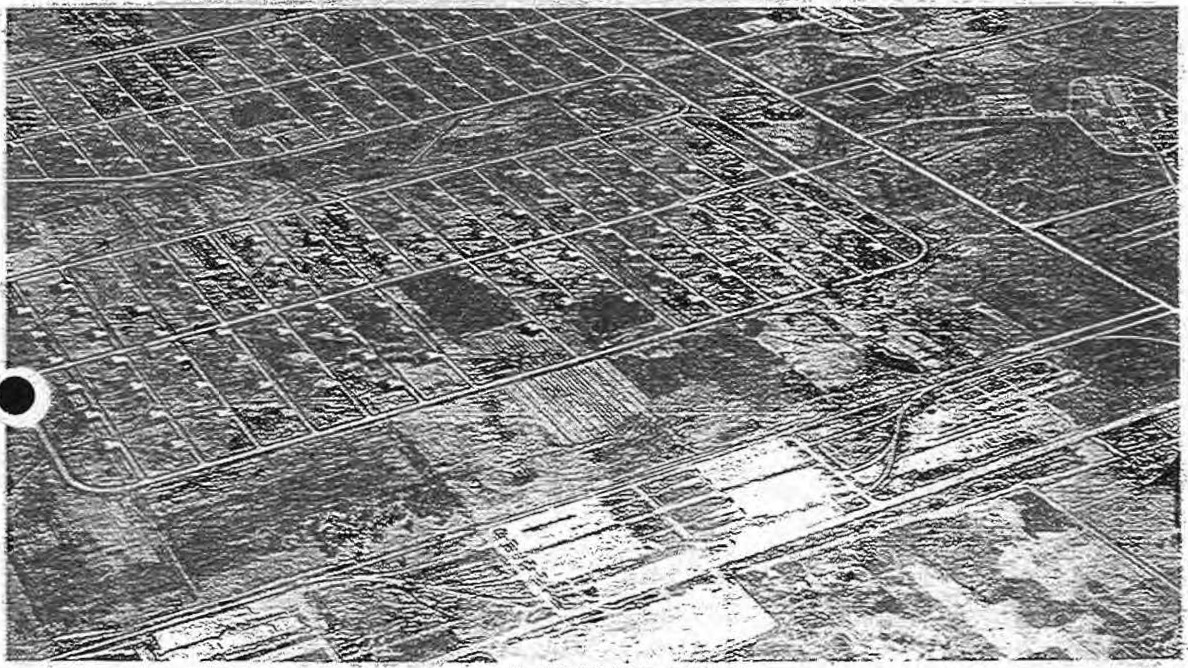
Magazine Area

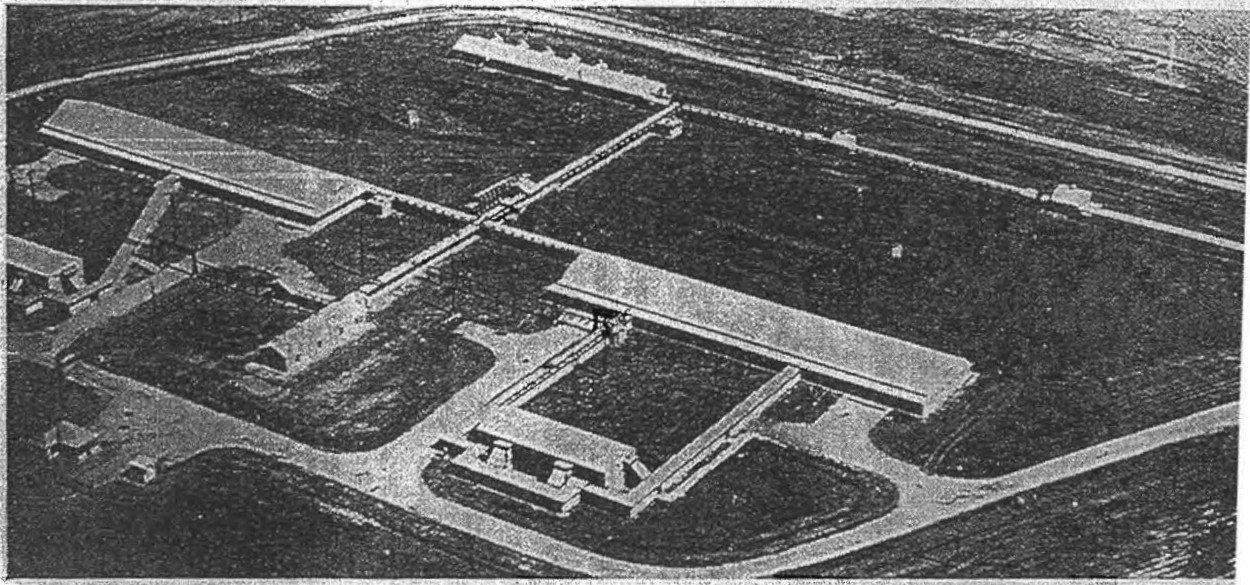
Booster Load Line B-1

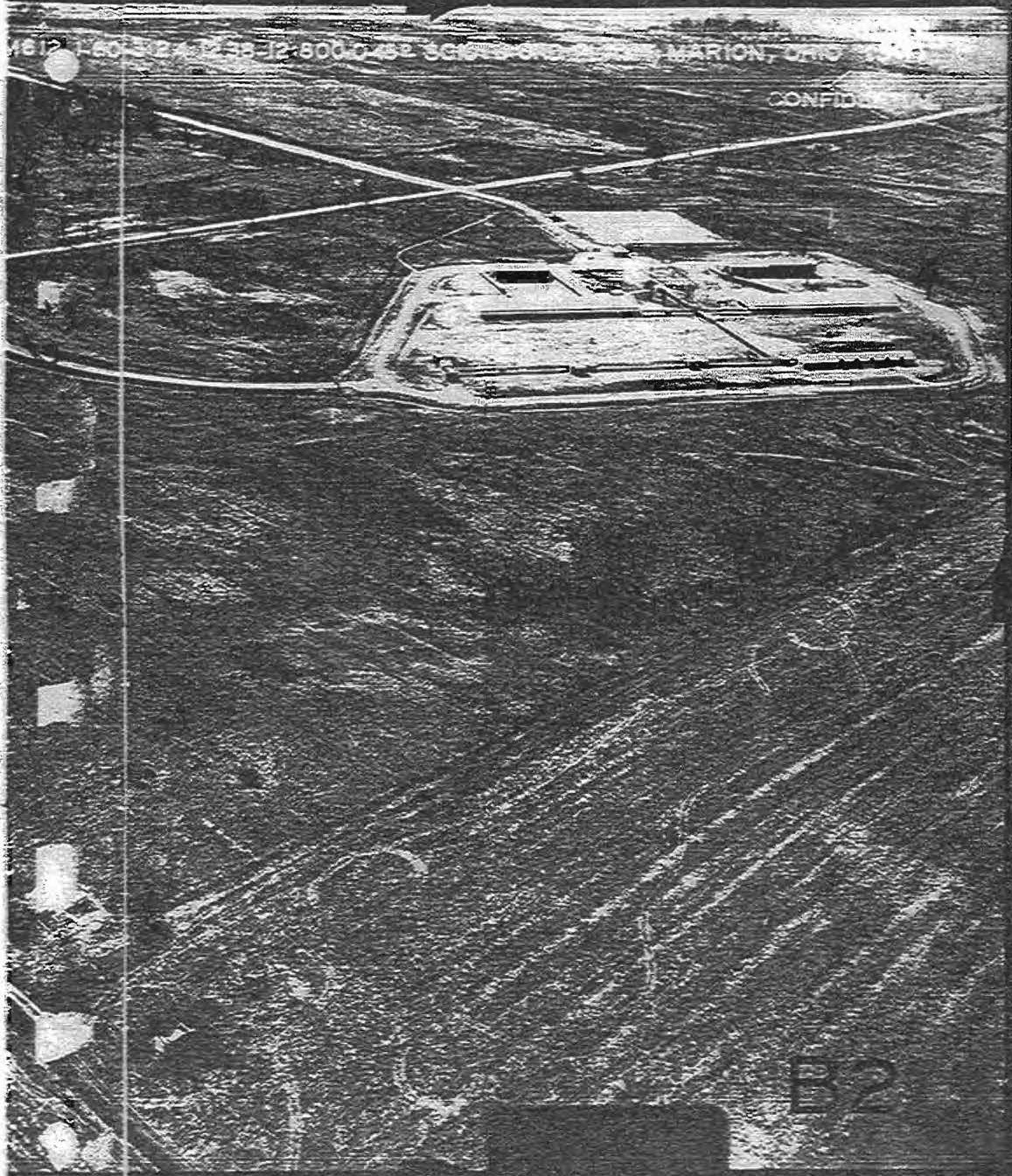
Booster Load Line B-2

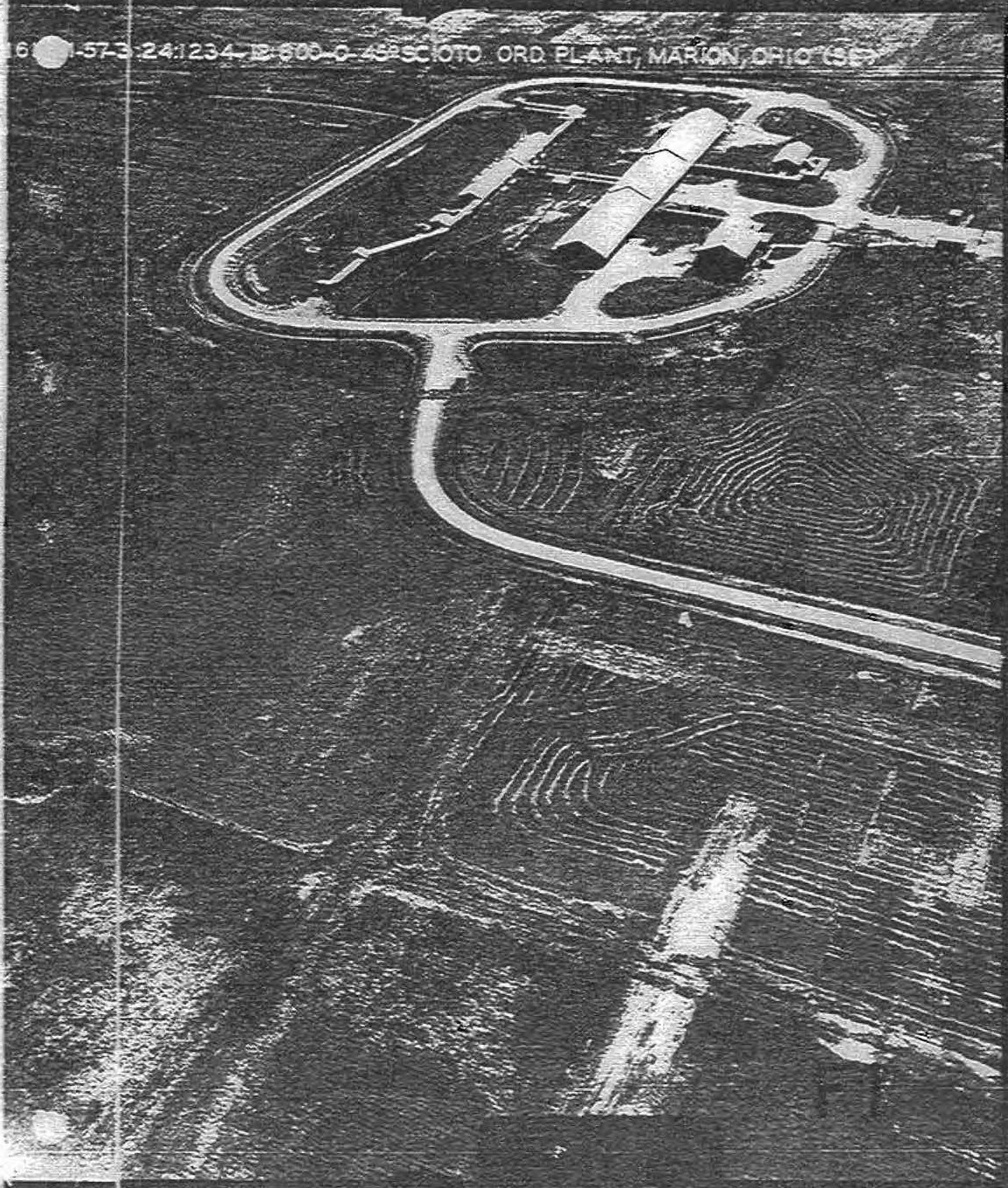
Line F-1

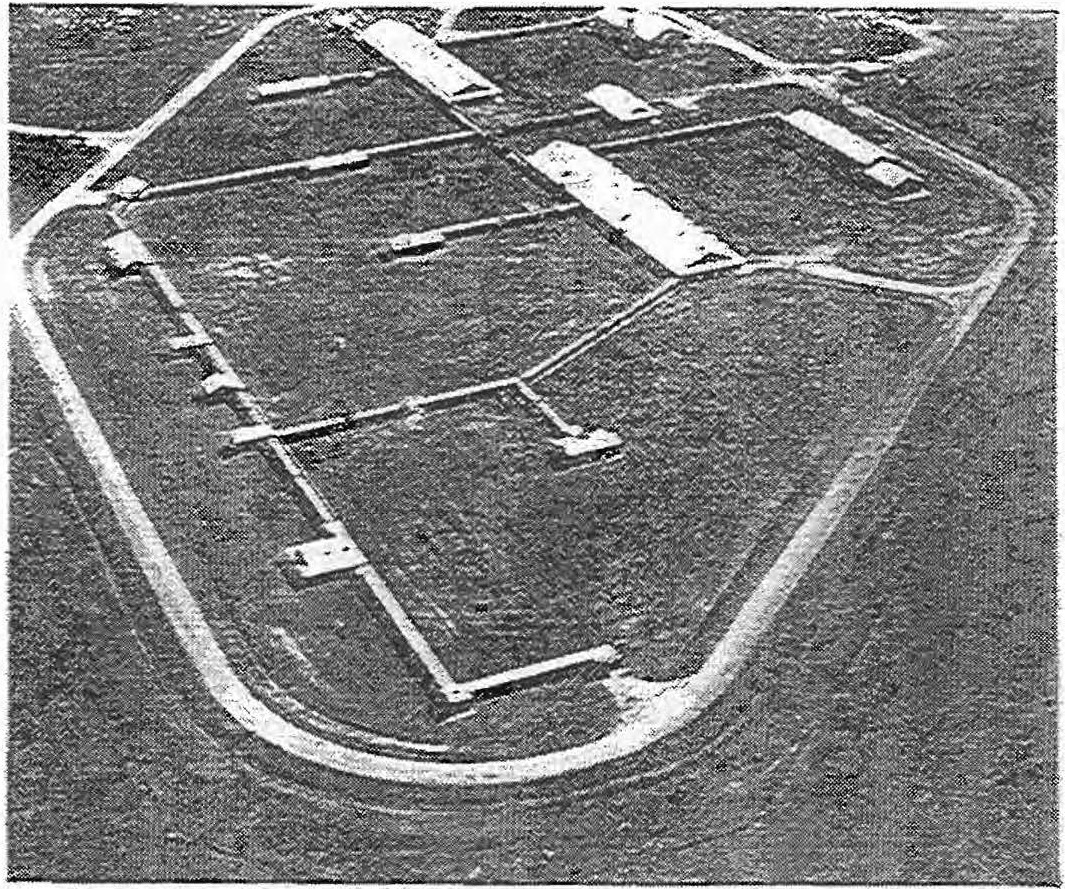
Line F-2

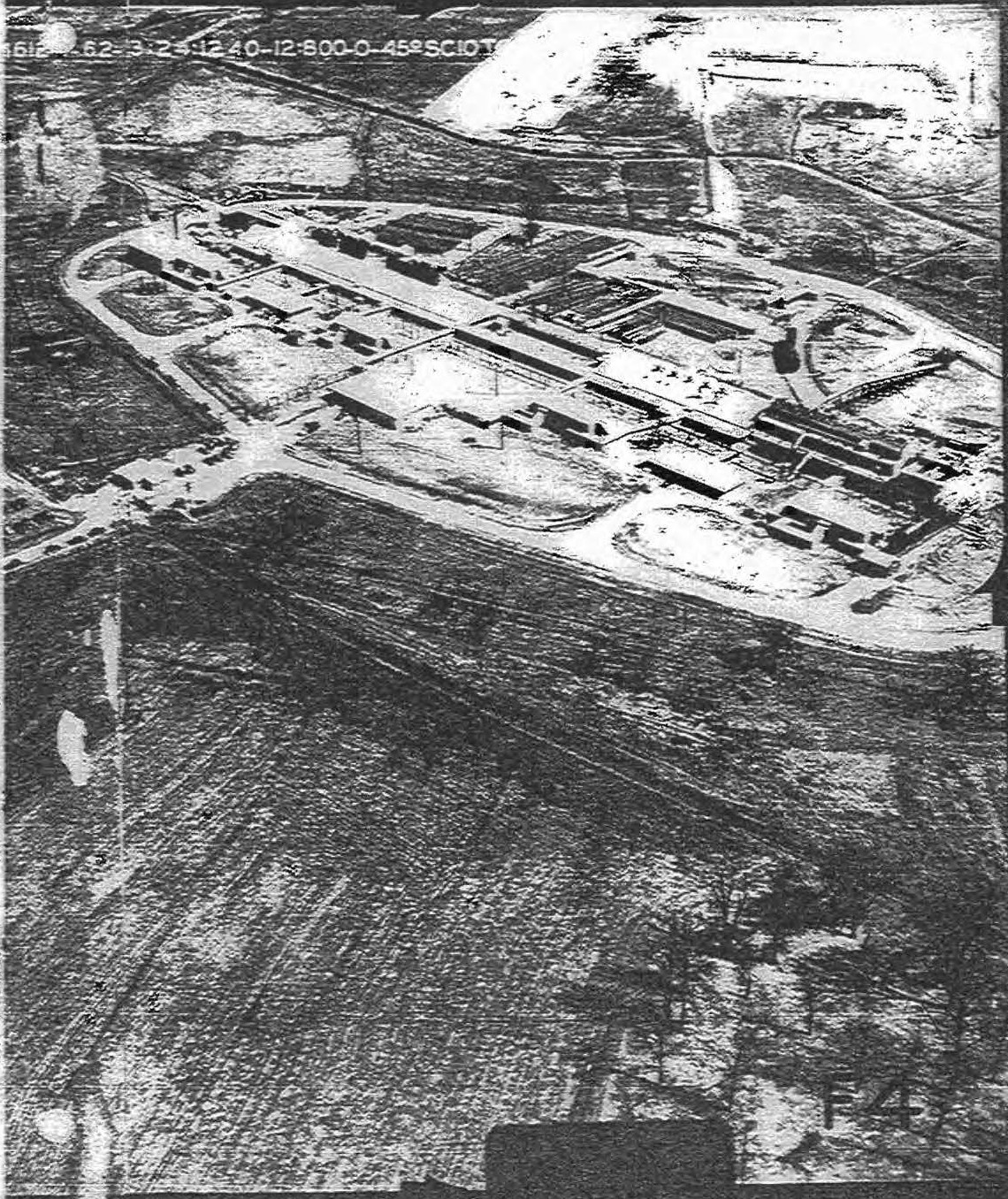
Line F-4

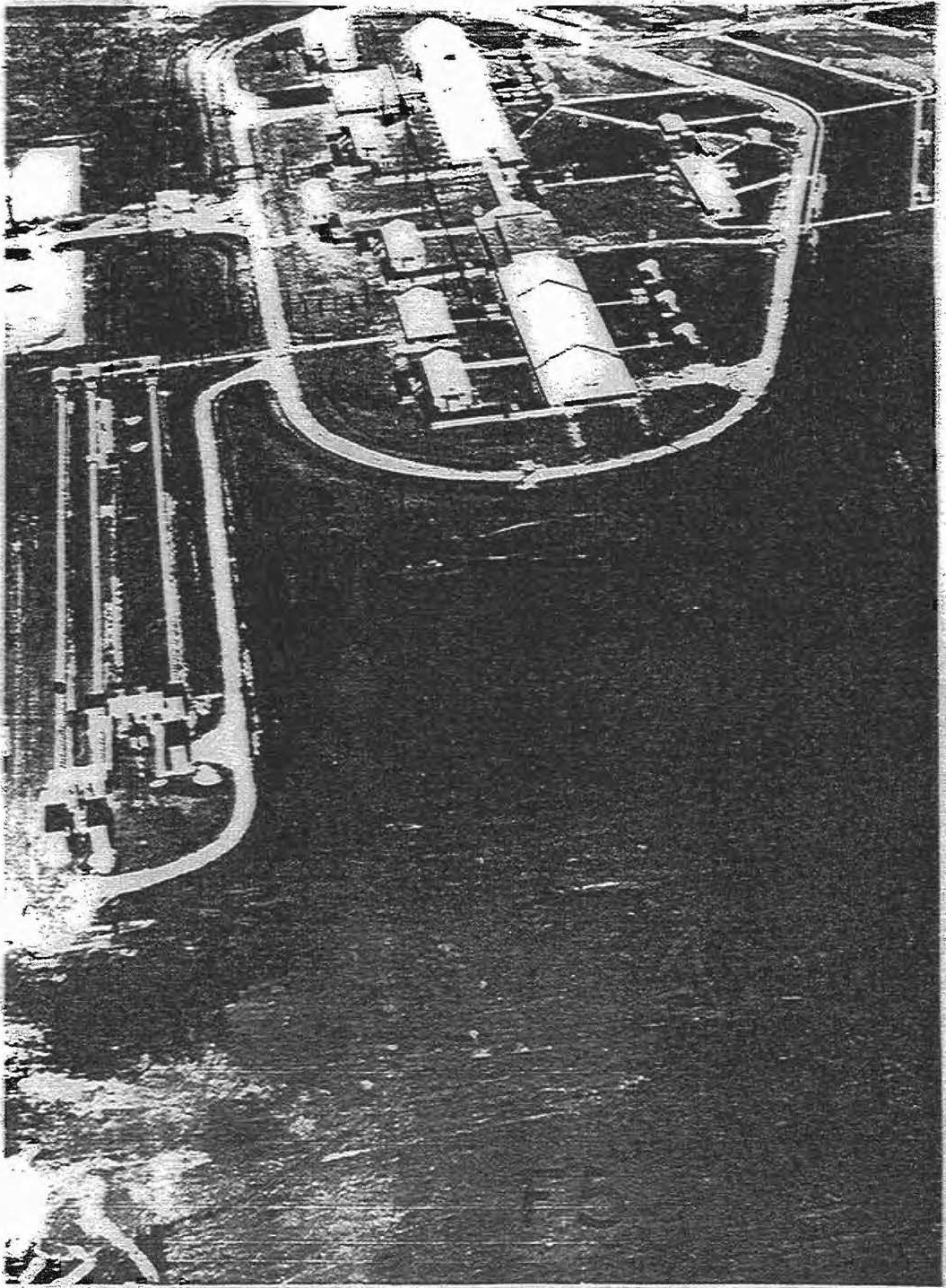
Line F-5

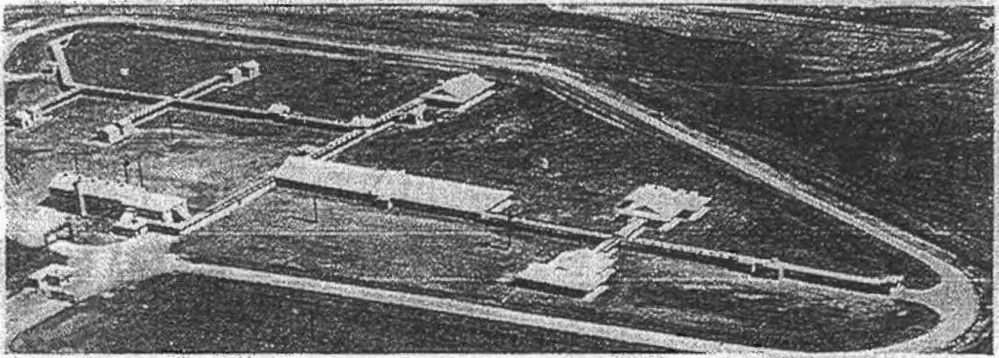
Line F-6

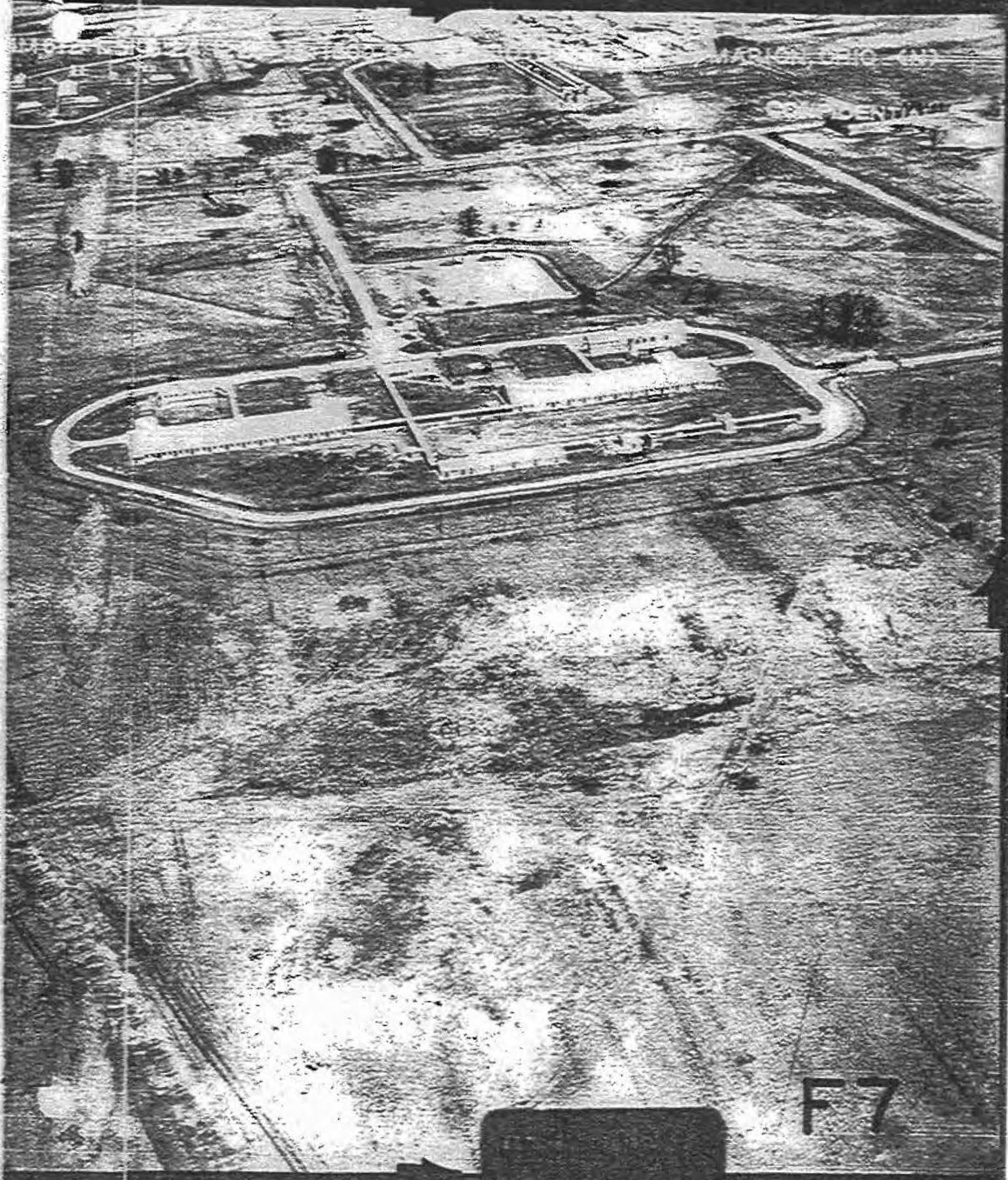
Line F-7

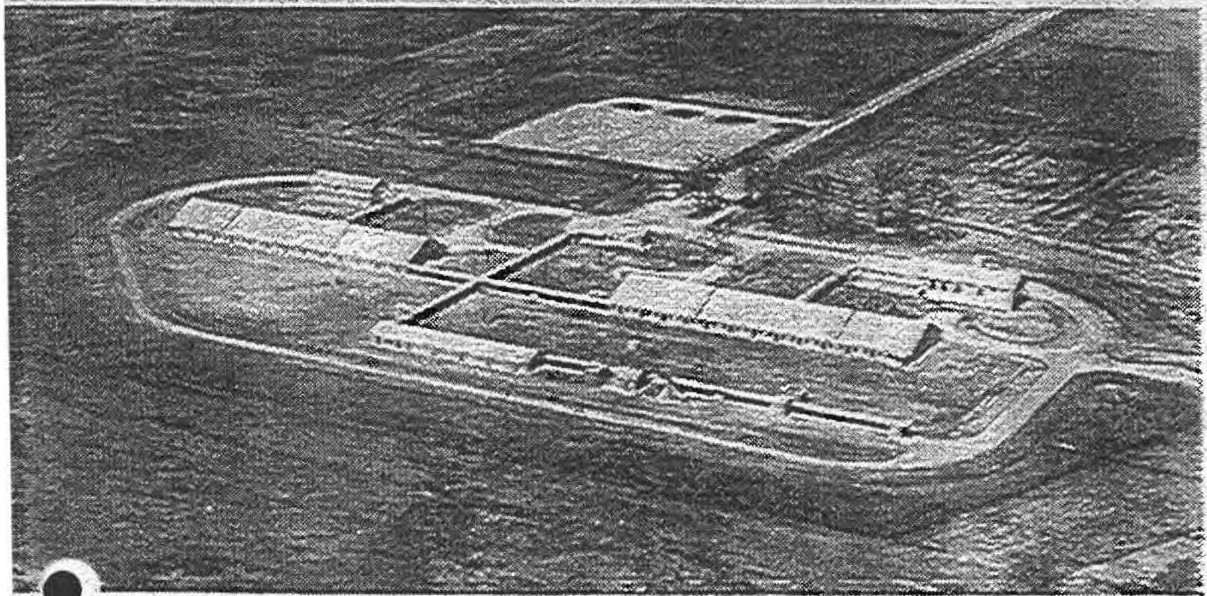
Line F-8

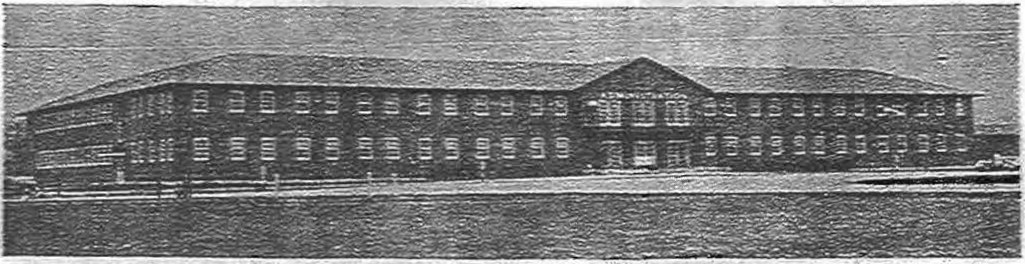
Administration Building

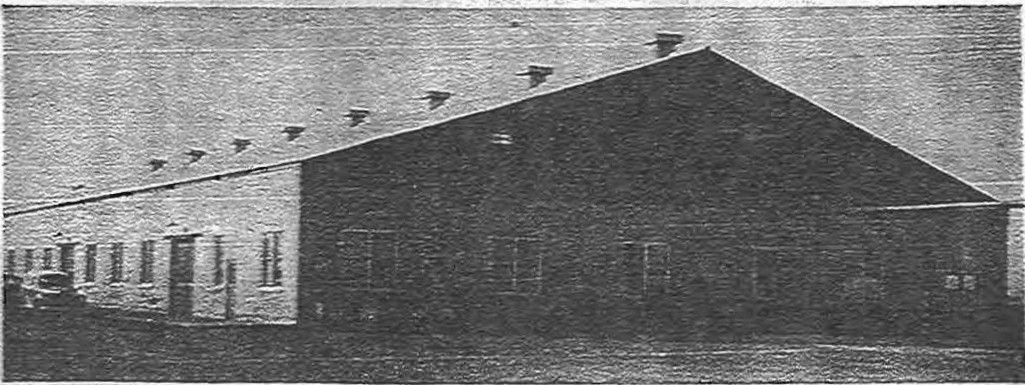
Maintenance and Repair Building
