= Big Island, Ohio =

Unincorporated community in Ohio, U.S.

Coordinates: 40°36′44″N 83°13′01″W

Big Island is an unincorporated community in Marion County, in the U.S. state of Ohio. Big Island is served by Ridgedale Local School District.

== History ==
A post office called Big Island was established in 1829, and remained in operation until 1870. The community takes its name from Big Island Township. Besides the post office, Big Island had a hotel and several shops.
