= Buckeye Valley High School =

Location
- 901 Coover Road; Delaware, Oh; Delaware, (Delaware County), Ohio 43015; United States
- 40°20′58″N 83°5′32″W

Information
- Type: Public, Coeducational high school
- Motto: "Where tradition meets innovation."
- Opened: 1963
- School district: Buckeye Valley Local School District
- Principal: Zachary Riggs
- Teaching staff: 36.21 (FTE)
- Grades: 9-12
- Enrollment: 597 (2024–2025)
- Student to teacher ratio: 16.49
- Colors: Brown and Gold
- Slogan: Baron P.R.I.D.E. (Positivity, Responsibility, Integrity, Drive, and Engagement)
- Fight song: Down The Field/Gladiators
- Athletics conference: Central Buckeye League (CBL) formerly Mid-Ohio Athletic Conference
- Mascot: Barons (Bellpoint, Ashley, Radnor, Ostrander, Norton, Scioto Reserve)
- Team name: Barons
- Newspaper: N/A
- Website: BVHS website

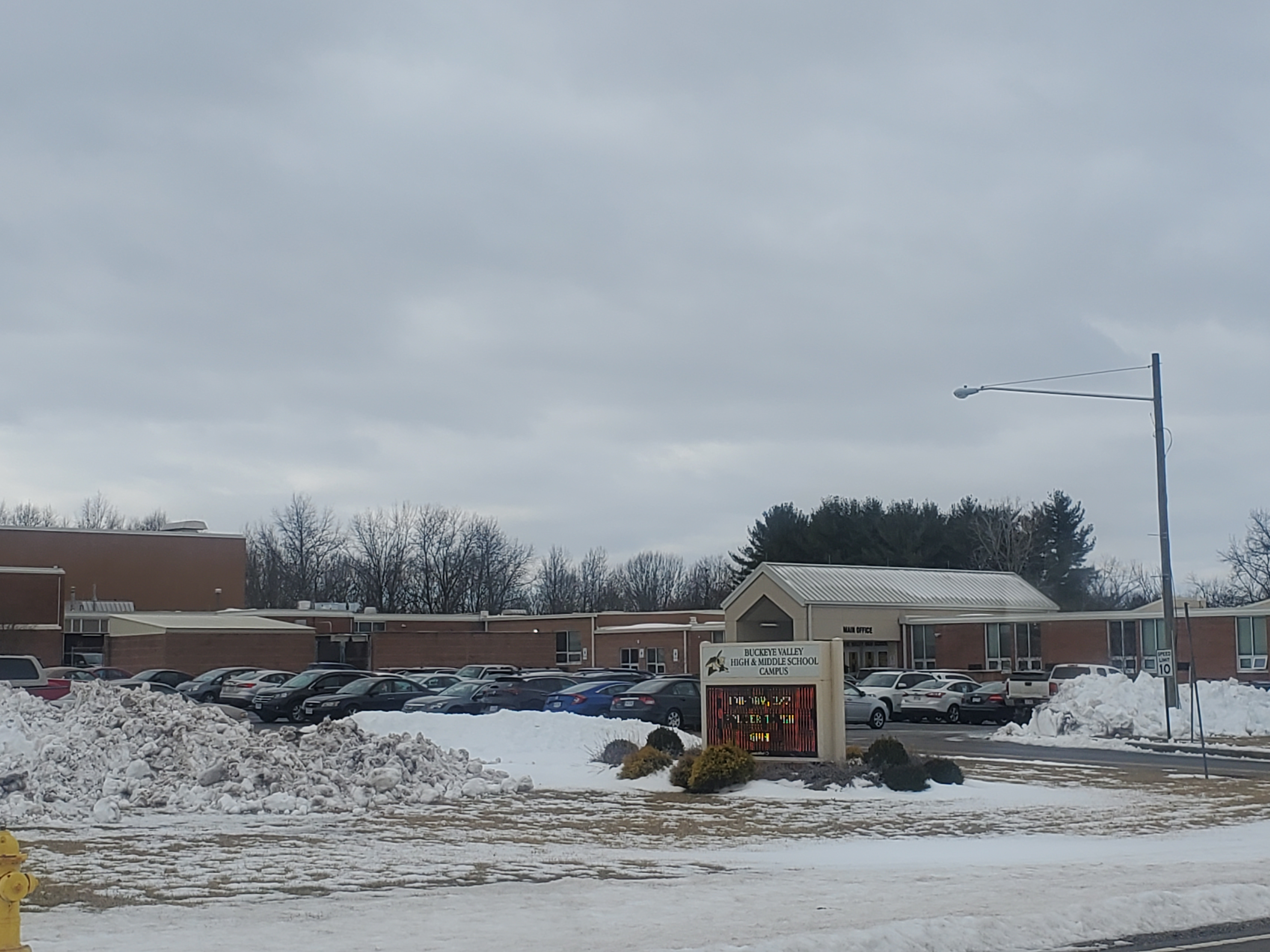
Buckeye Valley High School

Buckeye Valley High School is a rural public high school located in Delaware County's Troy Township, north of Delaware, Ohio. It is the only high school in the Buckeye Valley Local School District. The mascot is the Fighting Baron. BVHS was part of the Mid-Ohio Athletic Conference, but joined the Mid-State League in 2019, later moving into the CBL (Central Buckeye League)in 2023

== History ==
The Buckeye Valley High School Barons was established in 1963 as a consolidation of the Elm Valley (Ashley) Aces, the Radnor (Local) Trojans, and the Scioto Valley (Ostrander) Rockets and combined the towns of Bellpoint, Ashley, Radnor, Ostrander, and Norton. The combining of the towns is where the school's mascot, the baron, comes from. The high school building located on Coover Road in Troy Township still exists to this day. It has had one expansion in 1997 and was added onto once again in 2010. Over the years, BVHS had around 600 students; however, today it houses approximately 800 students in grades 9–12.

== Music and Athletics ==
Buckeye Valley High School (BVHS) offers Marching Band, Concert Band, Jazz Band, and Various Vocal Music programs such as, Visions Show Choir, Barontonix, Men's Choir, and Chorale. In the fall, the school puts on a play, and in the winter the school puts on a musical.

BVHS offers a large number of sports in the fall, winter, and spring. In the fall there is Football, Girls Tennis, Boys Golf and Boys Soccer. In the winter there is Bowling, Swim Team, and Gymnastics. And in the spring there is Boys Tennis, Girls Golf, Boys and Girls Lacrosse, and many more. There is a rivalry with sports between BVHS and neighboring school district, Delaware City Schools, or the “Pacers”. Every season the first game that many teams play is the Pacers.

Buckeye Valley has produced some great athletes such as golfing legend, Ben Curtis and basketball player, Scott Thomas, who played for Bowling Green State University, and went on to play in Europe.

While Buckeye Valley has not won a team OHSAA title in any sport, a couple of predecessor schools have. Ashley High School won a boys' Track title in 1922. Bellpoint won Track in 1925 and basketball in 1924 and 1925.

== Notable alumni ==
- Ben Curtis, 2003 Open Championship winner
