= Highland High School (Sparta, Ohio) =

Coordinates: 40°23′52″N 82°42′22″W

Location
- 6506 State Route 229; Sparta, (Morrow County), Ohio 43350; United States

Information
- School type: Public, high school
- Established: 1960; 66 years ago
- School district: Highland Local School District
- Superintendent: Nathan Huffman
- Principal: Chad Carpenter
- Teaching staff: 32.10 (FTE) (2023-2024)
- Grades: 9-12
- Gender: Coeducational
- Enrollment: 489 (2023-2024)
- Student to teacher ratio: 15.23 (2023-2024)
- Colors: Red; White; Blue
- Athletics conference: Mid Ohio Athletic Conference (MOAC)
- Team name: Fighting Scots
- Website: highland.k12.oh.us/high-school
- Last updated: February 2, 2019; 7 years ago

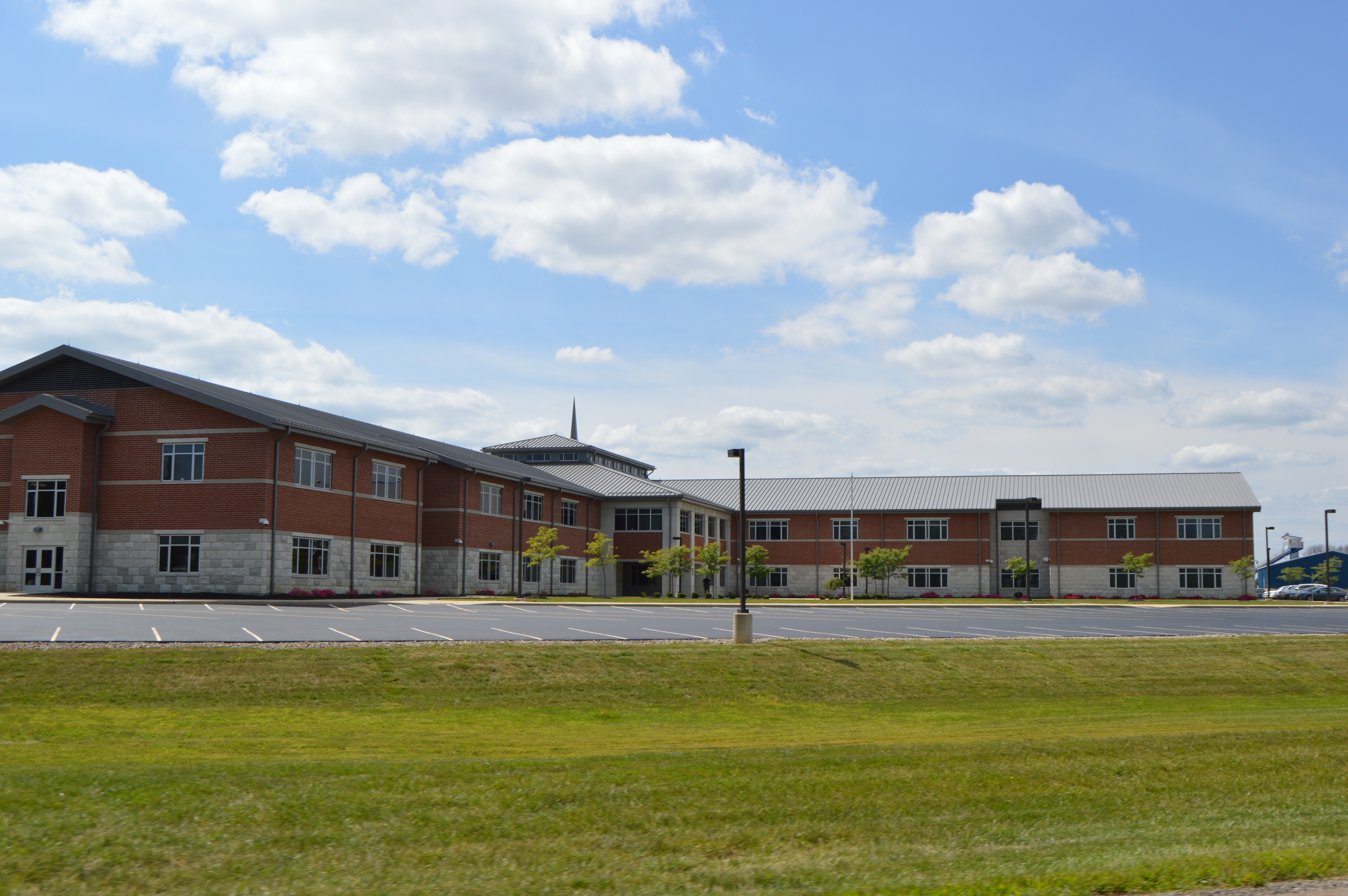
Overview from State Route 314 to the east

Highland High School is a public high school near Sparta, Ohio. It is the only high school in the Highland Local School District.

== Ohio High School Athletic Association State Championships ==
- Boys Basketball – 1998

== Notable alumni ==
- Tim Belcher, Retired MLB Pitcher
