= Ridgedale Local School District =

School district in Ohio, United States

Address
- 3103 Hillman Ford Road Morral, Ohio, 43337; United States
- Coordinates: 40°41′22″N 83°12′47″W

District information
- Type: Public
- Motto: "Respectful, Responsible, Positive"
- Grades: PK–12
- Schools: 2
- NCES District ID: 3904843

Students and staff
- Students: 621 (2024–2025)
- Teachers: 48.71 (on an FTE basis) (2024–2025)
- Staff: 97.65 (on an FTE basis) (2024–2025)
- Student–teacher ratio: 12.75 (2024–2025)

Other information
- Website: www.ridgedaleschools.org

Ridgedale Local School District is a public school district serving students in and around the village of Morral in Marion County, Ohio, United States. The superintendent is Dr. Erika Bower. As of October 2019, the school district enrolls 621 students. In addition to Morral, the school district includes the communities of Big Island, Brush Ridge, Kirkpatrick, Meeker, and northwestern Marion.

== Demographics ==
The Ohio Department of Education classifies the school district as "rural; high student poverty; small student population". 47% of students are reported to live in poverty.

== Schools ==
- Ridgedale Elementary School (Grades K through 5th)
- Ridgedale High School (Grades 6th through 12th)
