= Pleasant High School (Marion, Ohio) =

Pleasant Local School District

Location
- 1101 Owens Road West; Marion, Ohio 43302; United States
- Coordinates: 40°31′10″N 83°08′10″W

Information
- Type: Public
- Superintendent: Tom McDonnell
- Principal: Steven Ringer
- Teaching staff: 26.20 (FTE)
- Grades: 9–12
- Gender: coeducational
- Enrollment: 345 (2023-2024)
- Student to teacher ratio: 13.17
- Colors: Red and black
- Athletics conference: Mid-Ohio Athletic Conference (Red Division)
- Team name: Spartans
- Website: www.pleasantlocalschools.org

Pleasant Local High School, also known as Pleasant High School and Marion Pleasant High School, is a public high school in Pleasant Township, near Marion, Ohio. It is the only high school in the Pleasant Local School District. Student enrollment was at 369 as of October 2017.

== Athletics ==
- Baseball
- Boys' Basketball
- Girls' Basketball
- Bowling
- Cross Country
- Football
- Golf
- Boys & Girls Soccer
- Softball
- Swimming
- Boys' Tennis
- Girls' Tennis
- Track & Field
- Girls' Volleyball
- Wrestling

Pleasant is a member of the Ohio High School Athletic Association and the Mid-Ohio Athletic Conference. Pleasant has won the overall Mid-Ohio Athletic Conference (MOAC) All Sports Championship 14 times (11 in the last 14 years) since the MOAC began in 1990. The 2011–12 season was notable due to the football team finishing with a 10–0 for the regular season, winning their 17th straight MOAC title, and making the state playoffs for the 17th time. The volleyball team finished with a 23–3 record, winning their 8th straight MOAC Championship.

== Ohio High School Athletic Association State Championships ==
- Boys' Baseball – 2001, 2006
- Boys' Basketball – 1973
- Boys' Bowling – 2024
- Boys' Football – 1971, 1972, 1996, 2002
- Boys' Golf – 1989
- Boys' Track and Field – 2002
- Wrestling State Duals- 2007, 2008

== Notable alumni ==
- Shawn Heflick (1987), National Geographic TV host
- Trevor Harris (2005), CFL quarterback
