= Elgin High School (Ohio) =

Coordinates: 40°34′02″N 83°14′50″W

Location
- 1150 Keener Rd. South; Marion, (Marion County), Ohio 43302; United States

Information
- Type: Public, Coeducational high school
- School district: Elgin Local Schools
- Superintendent: Lane Warner
- Principal: Chad Cunningham
- Teaching staff: 18.50 (FTE)
- Grades: 9-12
- Colors: Scarlet & Gray
- Athletics conference: Northwest Central Conference (NWCC)
- Sports: baseball, basketball, volleyball, bowling, swimming, cheer leading, golfing, softball, football, wrestling, track and field, cross country
- Mascot: Comet
- Team name: Comets
- Athletic Director: Jason Hix
- Website: School website

Elgin High School is a public high school near Marion, Ohio. It is the only high school in the Elgin Local Schools district. The school's team name is the Comets. The school enrollment is 271 as of the 2020-21 school year.

== Notable alumni ==
- Brian Agler, Former WNBA coach, Athletic Director at Wittenberg University
- Toby Harrah, Former MLB player (Washington Senators, Texas Rangers, Cleveland Indians, New York Yankees)
