= Clear Fork High School =

Public school in Ohio, United States

Coordinates: 40°36′37″N 82°28′29″W

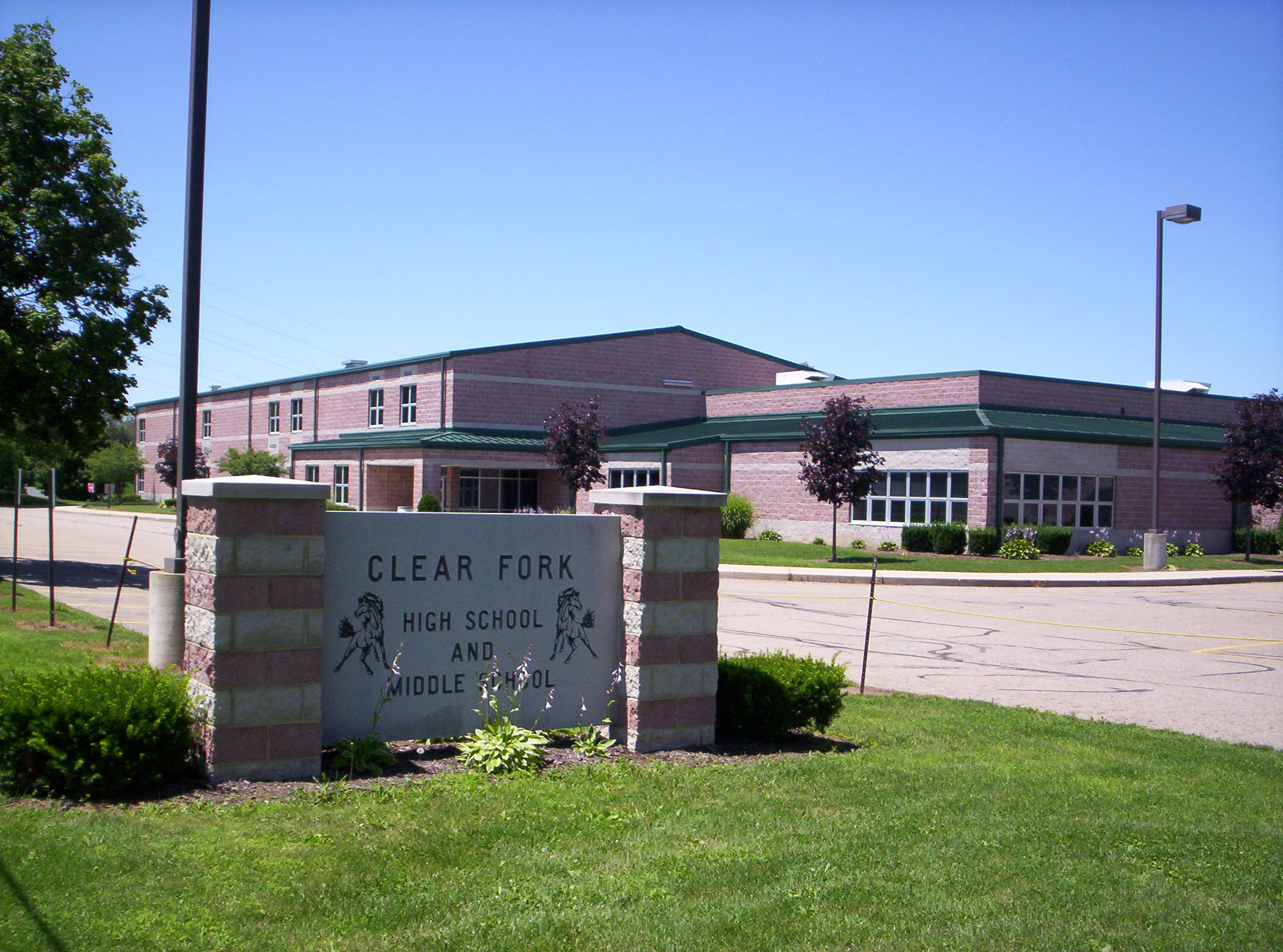
- 987 State Route 97 E Bellville, Ohio 44813; United States

Information
- Type: Public
- Established: 1961
- Enrollment: 457 (2023-2024)
- Colors: Kelly green, black and white
- Athletics conference: Mid-Ohio Athletic Conference
- Nickname: Colts
- Rival: Lexington
- Information: (419) 886-2601

Clear Fork High School is a secondary school located near Bellville, Ohio, United States. It serves grades 9–12 and is part of the Clear Fork Valley Local School District. Clear Fork is a member of the Mid-Ohio Athletic Conference.

== Athletics ==
=== Ohio High School Athletic Association State Championships ===
- Boys' basketball – 2002
- Boys' baseball – 2010

==== Mid-Ohio Athletic Conference ====
- Boys' wrestling (team) – 2023-25
- Boys' wrestling (individual) – 2026
