= Morral, Ohio =

- Village
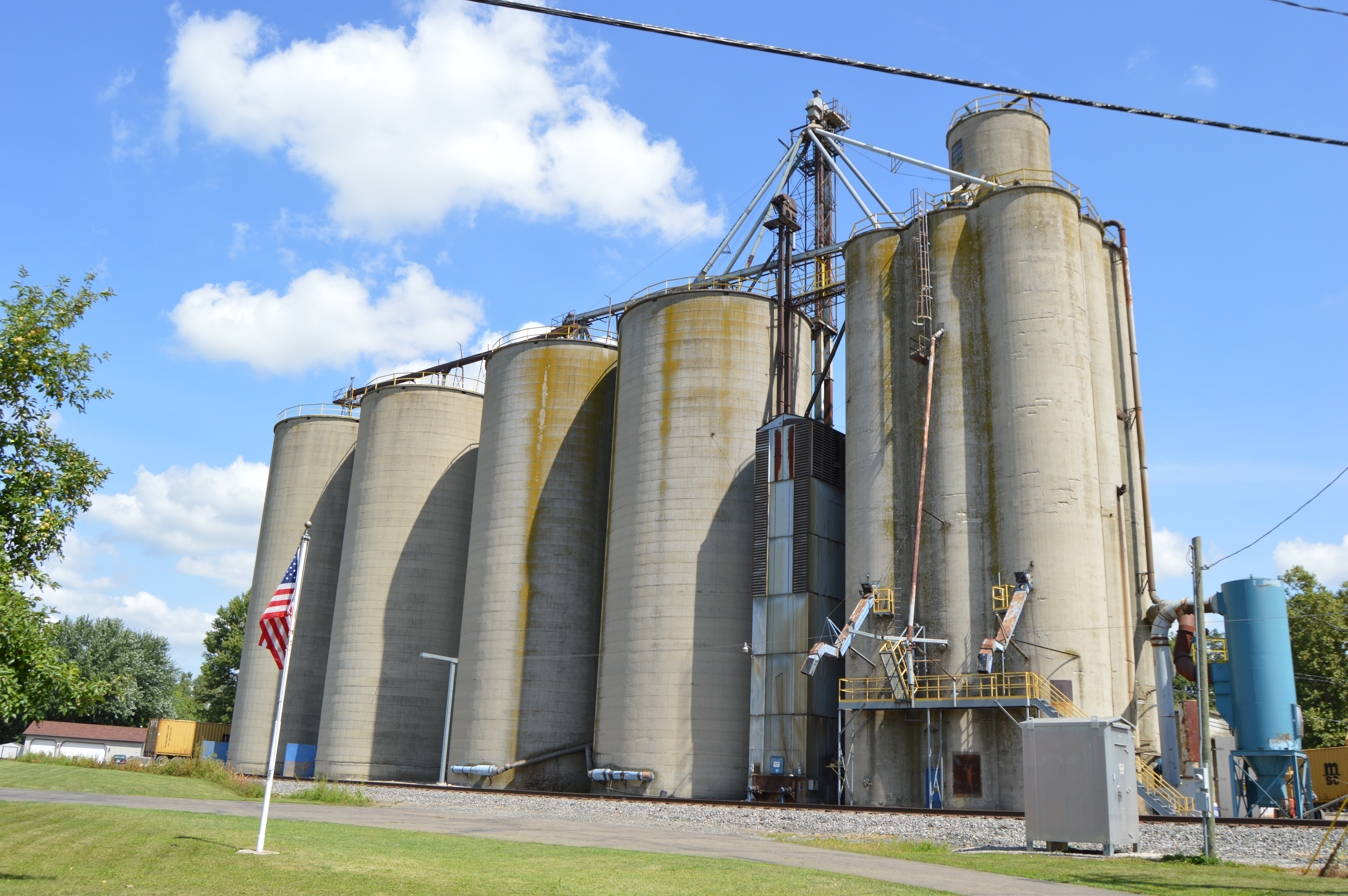
- Grain elevator on Neff Street at the railroad

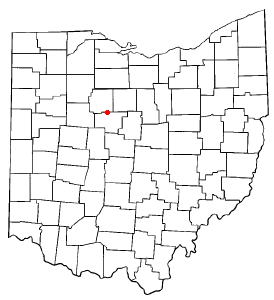
- Location of Morral, Ohio

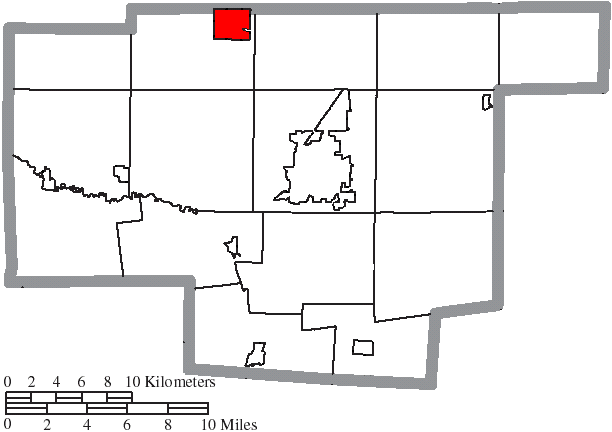
- Location of Morral in Marion County
- Coordinates: 40°41′29″N 83°12′35″W
- Country: United States
- State: Ohio
- County: Marion
- Township: Salt Rock

Area
  - Total: 2.70 sq mi (7.00 km^{2})
  - Land: 2.70 sq mi (7.00 km^{2})
  - Water: 0 sq mi (0.00 km^{2})
- Elevation: 896 ft (273 m)

Population (2020)
  - Total: 373
  - Density: 138.1/sq mi (53.32/km^{2})
- Time zone: UTC-5 (Eastern (EST))
  - Summer (DST): UTC-4 (EDT)
- ZIP code: 43337
- Area code: 740
- FIPS code: 39-52276
- GNIS feature ID: 2399395

Morral is a village in Marion County, Ohio, United States. The population was 373 at the 2020 census. Morral is served by Ridgedale Local School District.

== History ==
A post office called Morral has been in operation since 1877. The village was named after Samuel Morral, the original owner of the town site.

== Geography ==
According to the United States Census Bureau, the village has a total area of 2.70 square miles (6.99 km^{2}), all land.

== Demographics ==
Historical population
| Census | Pop. | Note | %± |
|---|---|---|---|
| 1910 | 334 | | — |
| 1920 | 387 | | 15.9% |
| 1930 | 451 | | 16.5% |
| 1940 | 398 | | −11.8% |
| 1950 | 461 | | 15.8% |
| 1960 | 493 | | 6.9% |
| 1970 | 452 | | −8.3% |
| 1980 | 454 | | 0.4% |
| 1990 | 373 | | −17.8% |
| 2000 | 388 | | 4.0% |
| 2010 | 399 | | 2.8% |
| 2020 | 373 | | −6.5% |
U.S. Decennial Census

=== 2010 census ===
As of the census of 2010, there were 399 people, 156 households, and 105 families living in the village. The population density was 147.8 inhabitants per square mile (57.1/km^{2}). There were 173 housing units at an average density of 64.1 per square mile (24.7/km^{2}). The racial makeup of the village was 96.5% White, 0.8% African American, 0.8% Native American, 0.3% Asian, 0.5% from other races, and 1.3% from two or more races. Hispanic or Latino of any race were 1.5% of the population.

There were 156 households, of which 36.5% had children under the age of 18 living with them, 50.6% were married couples living together, 10.3% had a female householder with no husband present, 6.4% had a male householder with no wife present, and 32.7% were non-families. 26.9% of all households were made up of individuals, and 9.6% had someone living alone who was 65 years of age or older. The average household size was 2.56 and the average family size was 3.06.

The median age in the village was 39.3 years. 24.8% of residents were under the age of 18; 7.3% were between the ages of 18 and 24; 24.6% were from 25 to 44; 32.1% were from 45 to 64; and 11.3% were 65 years of age or older. The gender makeup of the village was 49.6% male and 50.4% female.

=== 2000 census ===
As of the census of 2000, there were 388 people, 147 households, and 114 families living in the village. The population density was 143.0 inhabitants per square mile (55.2/km^{2}). There were 154 housing units at an average density of 56.7 per square mile (21.9/km^{2}). The racial makeup of the village was 99.74% White and 0.26% Native American.

There were 147 households, out of which 35.4% had children under the age of 18 living with them, 70.7% were married couples living together, 4.1% had a female householder with no husband present, and 21.8% were non-families. 18.4% of all households were made up of individuals, and 5.4% had someone living alone who was 65 years of age or older. The average household size was 2.64 and the average family size was 3.03.

In the village, the population was spread out, with 26.3% under the age of 18, 7.7% from 18 to 24, 28.4% from 25 to 44, 24.5% from 45 to 64, and 13.1% who were 65 years of age or older. The median age was 38 years. For every 100 females there were 107.5 males. For every 100 females age 18 and over, there were 95.9 males.

The median income for a household in the village was $39,167, and the median income for a family was $39,861. Males had a median income of $31,250 versus $18,977 for females. The per capita income for the village was $16,272. About 6.7% of families and 6.5% of the population were below the poverty line, including 12.9% of those under age 18 and none of those age 65 or over.

== Notable person ==
- Todd Gibson, former open-wheel race car driver in the Indy Car series.
