= Bellville, Ohio =

- Village
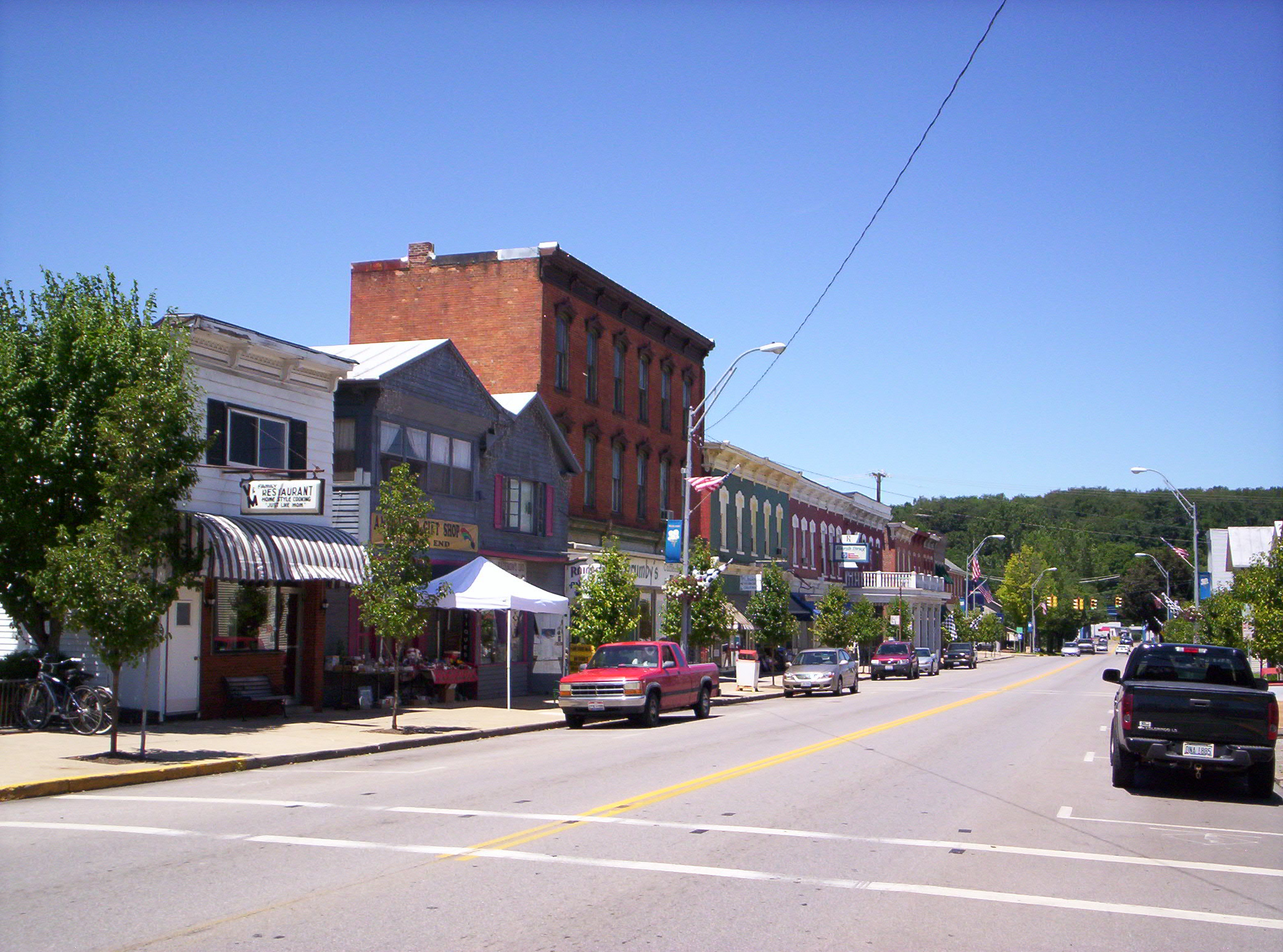
- Downtown Bellville on Main Street in 2008.

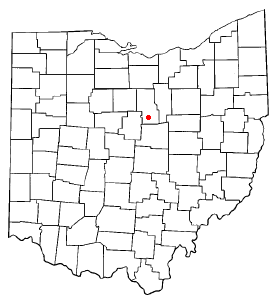
- Location of Bellville, Ohio

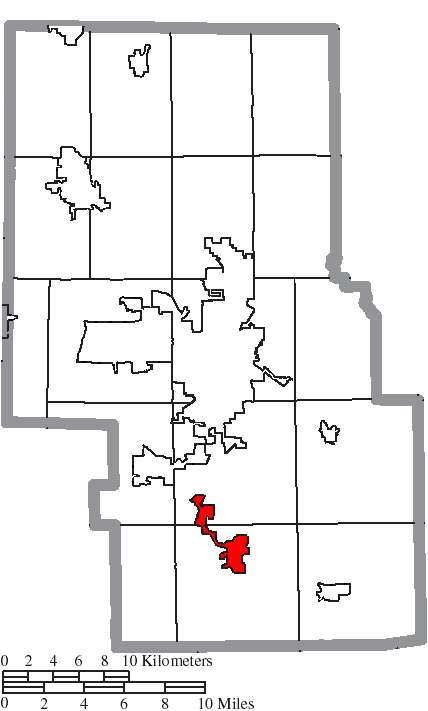
- Location of Bellville in Richland County
- Coordinates: 40°37′52″N 82°31′05″W
- Country: United States
- State: Ohio
- County: Richland
- Founded: 1808
- Incorporated: 1841 (village)

Government
  - Type: Ohio Statutory Village
  - Mayor: Teri L. Brenkus
  - Solicitor: Sarah Mussman

Area
  - Total: 2.87 sq mi (7.44 km^{2})
  - Land: 2.85 sq mi (7.38 km^{2})
  - Water: 0.023 sq mi (0.06 km^{2})
- Elevation: 1,152 ft (351 m)

Population (2020)
  - Total: 1,963
  - Estimate (2023): 1,986
  - Density: 688.5/sq mi (265.84/km^{2})
- Time zone: UTC-5 (Eastern (EST))
  - Summer (DST): UTC-4 (EDT)
- ZIP code: 44813
- Area code: 419
- FIPS code: 39-05284
- GNIS feature ID: 2398083
- Website: villageofbellville.com

Bellville is a village in Richland County in the U.S. state of Ohio. It is part of the Mansfield, Ohio Metropolitan Statistical Area. The population was 1,963 at the 2020 census.

== History ==
The first settlers, James McCluer, and Jonathan Oldfield, came to Bellville in 1808. They made their way from what it now known as Fredericktown by a path made from a tornado. McCluer gained ownership of the land and along with Oldfield he built the first cabin in Bellville on what is now known as Ankneytown Road. Even though they were the first settlers to the town and McCluer owned the land, Robert Bell was the actual founder of the village. Other early settlers included Thomas and Bridget O'Leary.

McCluer sold the land to Robert Bell in 1815, and Bell began to shape the village of Bellville. The development of Main Street, Ogle Street and Durbin Road began. There were 48 lots in Bellville and a tavern was among the first businesses to be constructed. The first post office came to Bellville in 1824, further helping to put its name on the map. Before the post office was built, those who lived in the village had to travel a long distance just to send a letter. The first church was constructed in Bellville map in 1834, though church services had taken place since 1814. Up to this point, people's homes were being used for church and school. The church was The Methodist Episcopal Church and was organized by Bell and preacher William Oldfield.

The first school started in Bellville shortly after McCluer settled on the land in his own cabin in 1818. At this time school was still limited to boys who had to travel long distances just to get there. Girls had to stay home and tend to household chores. By 1857 a working school started where the Clear Fork Elementary buildings are now. Those buildings are no longer used for school related purposes today.

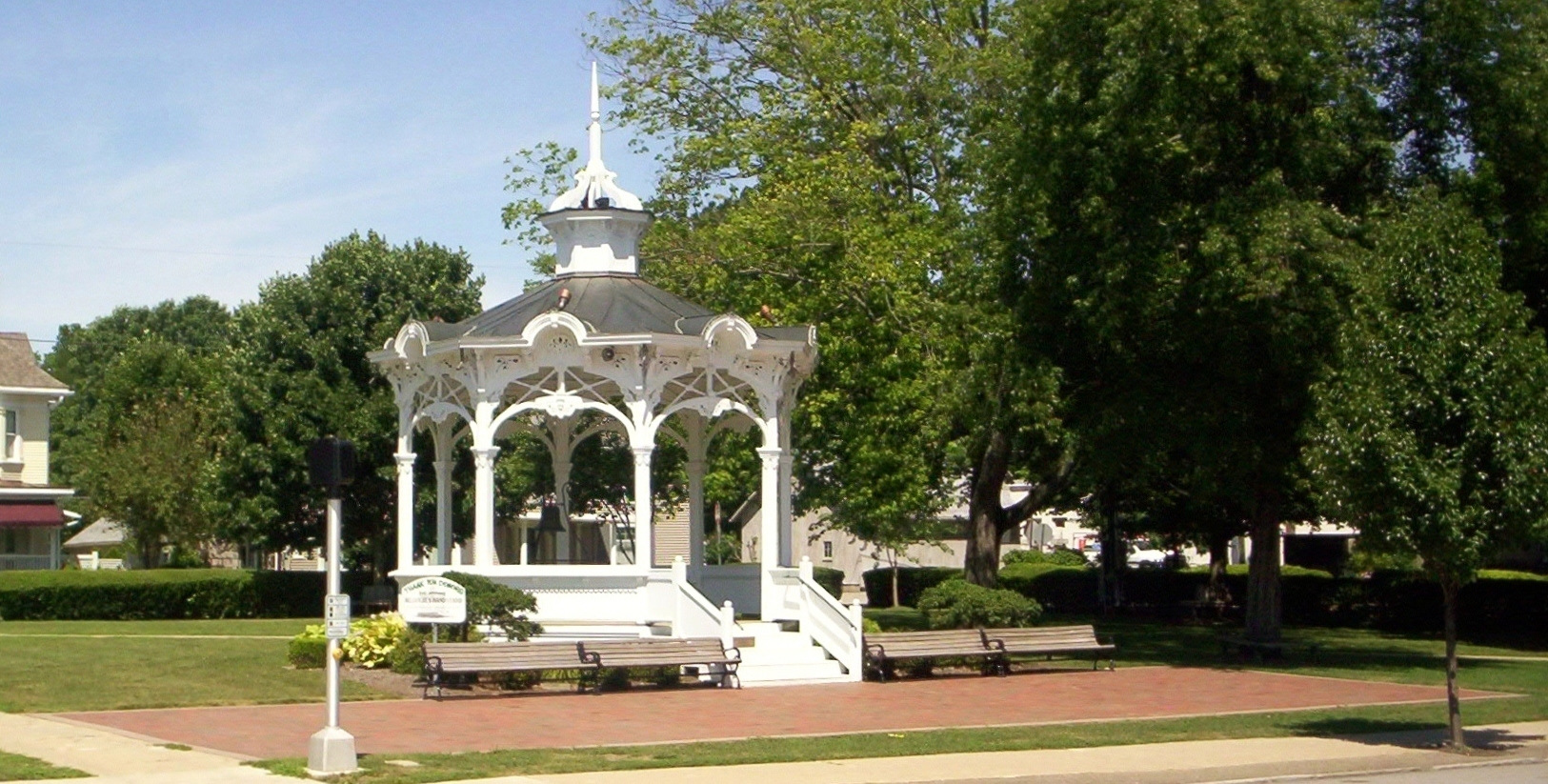
Bellville Bandstand

Commerce in the village began to rise in the 1870s. An electric plant started near the current bike trail and flour mill on route 97. The B&O railroad operated through the path of the bike trail as well. Two hotels started called Hotel Lefevre and Hotel Norris. The year 1877 marked the construction of the town hall and was a place for meetings and those who needed to be jailed. The popular bandstand which is in the middle of Bellville was built in 1879. A doctor's office was even developed for tuberculosis patients. Eventually, there were two blacksmith shops, hardware stores, a bakery, four grocery stores, two harness shops, two barber shops, multiple dentists and the Exchange bank in 1872.

Bellville was also well known for being a part of the gold rush. The first gold was panned on Dead Man's Run, which caused people from all over to come pan for gold. The gold was discovered by James C. Lee. Even though the gold that was found was almost pure, little more was discovered.

== Geography ==
Bellville is located at 40°37′32″N 82°31′5″W (40.625582, -82.518050), along the Clear Fork of the Mohican River.

According to the United States Census Bureau, the village has a total area of 2.75 square miles (7.12 km^{2}), of which 2.74 square miles (7.10 km^{2}) is land and 0.01 square miles (0.03 km^{2}) is water.

== Demographics ==
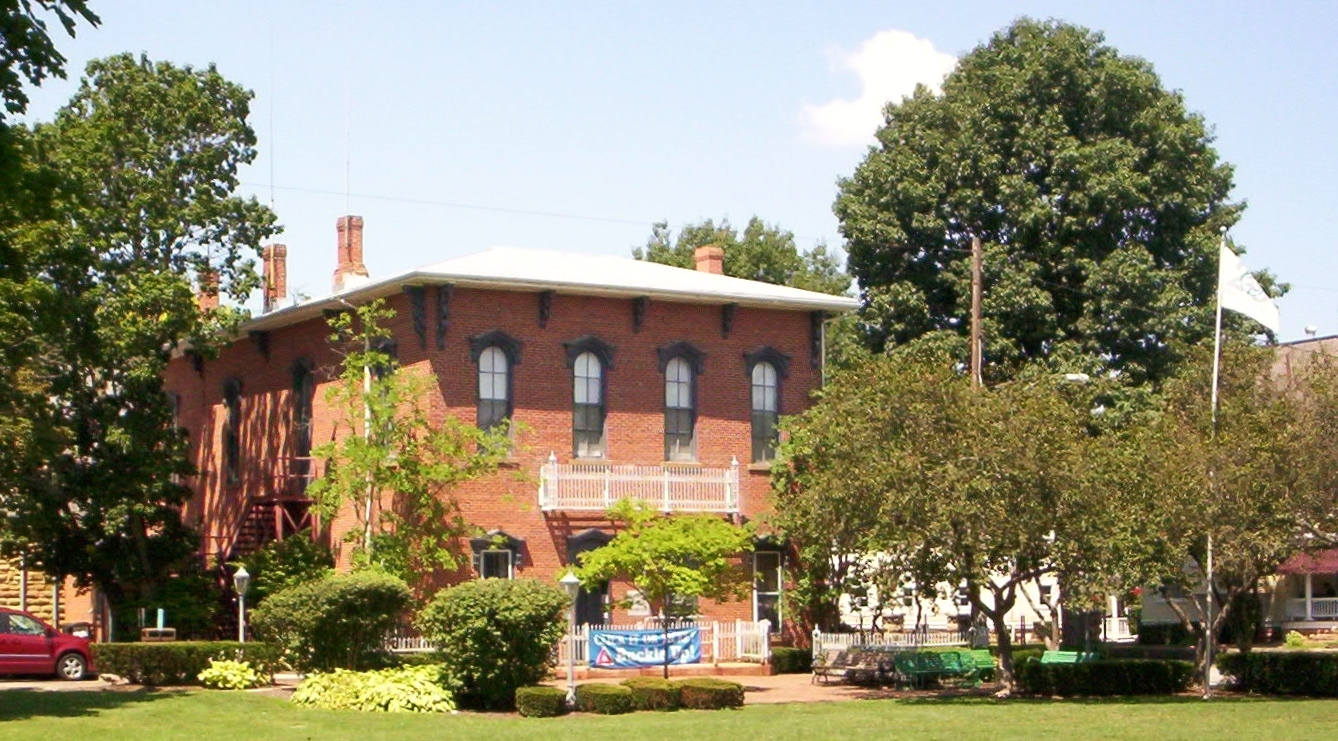
Bellville Village Hall

Historical population
| Census | Pop. | Note | %± |
|---|---|---|---|
| 1870 | 720 | | — |
| 1880 | 971 | | 34.9% |
| 1890 | 941 | | −3.1% |
| 1900 | 1,039 | | 10.4% |
| 1910 | 1,056 | | 1.6% |
| 1920 | 998 | | −5.5% |
| 1930 | 987 | | −1.1% |
| 1940 | 1,199 | | 21.5% |
| 1950 | 1,355 | | 13.0% |
| 1960 | 1,621 | | 19.6% |
| 1970 | 1,685 | | 3.9% |
| 1980 | 1,714 | | 1.7% |
| 1990 | 1,568 | | −8.5% |
| 2000 | 1,773 | | 13.1% |
| 2010 | 1,918 | | 8.2% |
| 2020 | 1,963 | | 2.3% |
| 2023 (est.) | 1,986 | ▲ | 1.2% |

=== 2010 census ===
As of the census of 2010, there were 1,918 people, 826 households, and 529 families residing in the village. The population density was 700.0 inhabitants per square mile (270.3/km^{2}). There were 882 housing units at an average density of 321.9 per square mile (124.3/km^{2}). The racial makeup of the village was 97.7% White, 0.5% African American, 0.2% Native American, 0.1% Asian, 0.1% from other races, and 1.5% from two or more races. Hispanic or Latino of any race were 0.5% of the population.

There were 826 households, of which 27.6% had children under the age of 18 living with them, 51.0% were married couples living together, 9.7% had a female householder with no husband present, 3.4% had a male householder with no wife present, and 36.0% were non-families. 32.6% of all households were made up of individuals, and 16.3% had someone living alone who was 65 years of age or older. The average household size was 2.32 and the average family size was 2.94.

The median age in the village was 42.8 years. 23.4% of residents were under the age of 18; 8.6% were between the ages of 18 and 24; 20.6% were from 25 to 44; 27% were from 45 to 64; and 20.5% were 65 years of age or older. The gender makeup of the village was 48.1% male and 51.9% female.

=== 2000 census ===
As of the census of 2000, there were 1,773 people, 751 households, and 504 families residing in the village. The population density was 615.9 inhabitants per square mile (237.8/km^{2}). There were 799 housing units at an average density of 277.6 per square mile (107.2/km^{2}). The racial makeup of the village was 98.82% White, 0.23% African American, 0.11% Native American, 0.23% Asian, 0.11% from other races, and 0.51% from two or more races. Hispanic or Latino of any race were 0.90% of the population.

There were 751 households, out of which 30.8% had children under the age of 18 living with them, 53.5% were married couples living together, 10.5% had a female householder with no husband present, and 32.8% were non-families. 29.7% of all households were made up of individuals, and 14.4% had someone living alone who was 65 years of age or older. The average household size was 2.36 and the average family size was 2.93.

In the village, the population was spread out, with 25.7% under the age of 18, 6.5% from 18 to 24, 28.5% from 25 to 44, 21.4% from 45 to 64, and 17.9% who were 65 years of age or older. The median age was 39 years. For every 100 females there were 88.8 males. For every 100 females age 18 and over, there were 84.6 males.

The median income for a household in the village was $34,492, and the median income for a family was $47,083. Males had a median income of $36,458 versus $21,800 for females. The per capita income for the village was $17,923. About 6.2% of families and 9.3% of the population were below the poverty line, including 15.8% of those under age 18 and 5.1% of those age 65 or over.

== Education ==
Bellville is located within the Clear Fork Valley Local School District. Schools in the district that are located in Bellville are Bellville Elementary School. Clear Fork Middle School and Clear Fork High School are located just outside Bellville.

Bellville has a public library, a branch of the Mansfield–Richland County Public Library.

== Notable people ==
- Duncan Spears Casper - Mormon pioneer.
- Levi H. Dowling - Preacher who published The Aquarian Gospel of Jesus the Christ.
- Francis Celeste Le Blond - Represented Ohio's 5th congressional district from 1963 to 1967.
- John W. Leedy - 14th Governor of Kansas
