= National Register of Historic Places listings in Marion County, Ohio =

Location of Marion County in Ohio

This is a list of the National Register of Historic Places listings in Marion County, Ohio.

This is intended to be a complete list of the properties and districts on the National Register of Historic Places in Marion County, Ohio, United States. The locations of National Register properties and districts for which the latitude and longitude coordinates are included below, may be seen in an online map.

There are 19 properties and districts listed on the National Register in the county, including 1 National Historic Landmark.

This National Park Service list is complete through NPS recent listings posted June 26, 2026.

== Current listings ==
	Name on the Register	Image	Date listed	Location	City or town	Description
1	Bretz Farm	Bretz Farm	January 8, 1980 (#80003155)	197 Morral-Kirkpatrick Rd., east of Morral; 40°41′16″N 83°09′20″W	Grand Prairie Township	
2	Caledonia Bowstring Bridge	Caledonia Bowstring Bridge	May 23, 1978 (#78002131)	North of Caledonia; 40°38′33″N 82°57′55″W	Claridon Township	
3	Caledonia Public Square and North Water Street Historic District	Caledonia Public Square and North Water Street Historic District	October 23, 2023 (#100009463)	Roughly bounded by North Water St., railroad tracks and North Street, High Street, and Public Square; 40°38′16″N 82°58′08″W	Caledonia	
4	Harding Tomb	Harding Tomb	June 16, 1976 (#76001485)	Marion Cemetery; 40°34′23″N 83°07′23″W	Marion	
5	Warren G. Harding House	Warren G. Harding House	October 15, 1966 (#66000618)	380 Mount Vernon Ave. 40°35′11″N 83°07′19″W	Marion	
6	Hotel Harding	Hotel Harding	March 11, 1980 (#80003154)	267 W. Center St. 40°35′17″N 83°08′00″W	Marion	
7	George W. King Mansion-Etowah	George W. King Mansion-Etowah	November 22, 1995 (#95001331)	429 Mount Vernon Ave. 40°35′06″N 83°07′14″W	Marion	
8	Marion Catholic School	Marion Catholic School	September 11, 2017 (#100001587)	1001 and 1047 Mount Vernon Ave. and 590 Forest Lawn Dr. 40°34′48″N 83°06′18″W	Marion	
9	Marion Cemetery Receiving Vault	Marion Cemetery Receiving Vault	December 13, 1995 (#95001415)	620 Delaware Ave. 40°34′34″N 83°07′20″W	Marion	
10	Marion County Courthouse	Marion County Courthouse	July 25, 1974 (#74001572)	100 N. Main St. 40°35′20″N 83°07′42″W	Marion	
11	Marion County Telephone Company Building	Marion County Telephone Company Building	April 12, 2007 (#07000298)	197 S. Main St. 40°35′12″N 83°07′45″W	Marion	Demolished
12	Marion Downtown Historic District	Marion Downtown Historic District	March 10, 2022 (#100007469)	Roughly bounded by Center, Vine, Pleasant, and Orchard Sts. 40°35′14″N 83°07′44″W	Marion	
13	Marion Township Sub-District No. 8 School	Marion Township Sub-District No. 8 School	February 7, 2007 (#07000027)	2473 State Route 4 N., north of Marion; 40°38′12″N 83°07′35″W	Marion Township	
14	Marion Women's Club Home	Marion Women's Club Home	December 23, 2019 (#100004781)	1126 E. Center St. 40°35′25″N 83°06′04″W	Marion	
15	Old US Post Office	Old US Post Office	November 28, 1990 (#90001777)	169 E. Church St. 40°35′14″N 83°07′32″W	Marion	
16	Palace Theatre	Palace Theatre	March 26, 1976 (#76001486)	272 W. Center St. 40°35′19″N 83°08′01″W	Marion	
17	Soldiers' and Sailors' Memorial Chapel	Soldiers' and Sailors' Memorial Chapel	March 9, 1995 (#95000169)	Eastern side of State Route 423 within Marion Cemetery; 40°34′39″N 83°07′28″W	Marion	
18	Temple & Masonic Block Buildings	Temple & Masonic Block Buildings	March 15, 2021 (#100006261)	107, 109, 111, and 127 East Marion St. 40°38′11″N 82°58′07″W	Caledonia	
19	Wyatt's Tavern-Fort Morrow Site	Wyatt's Tavern-Fort Morrow Site	December 22, 1978 (#78002132)	Along the Olentangy River, 1 mile (1.6 km) north of Norton; 40°26′39″N 83°04′15″W	Waldo Township	

== See also ==
- List of National Historic Landmarks in Ohio
- Listings in neighboring counties: Crawford, Delaware, Hardin, Morrow, Union, Wyandot
- National Register of Historic Places listings in Ohio
