= Ohio State Route 95 =

State highway in central Ohio, US

State Route 95

Route information
- Maintained by ODOT
- Length: 89.04 mi (143.30 km)
- Existed: 1926–present

Major junctions
- West end: SR 37 in LaRue
- US 23 near Marion; US 42 / SR 61 in Mount Gilead; I-71 near Mount Gilead
- East end: SR 3 near Wooster

Location
- Country: United States
- State: Ohio
- Counties: Marion, Morrow, Knox, Richland, Ashland, Wayne

Highway system
- Ohio State Highway System; Interstate; US; State; Scenic
← SR 94	→ SR 96
← US 42	→ SR 43

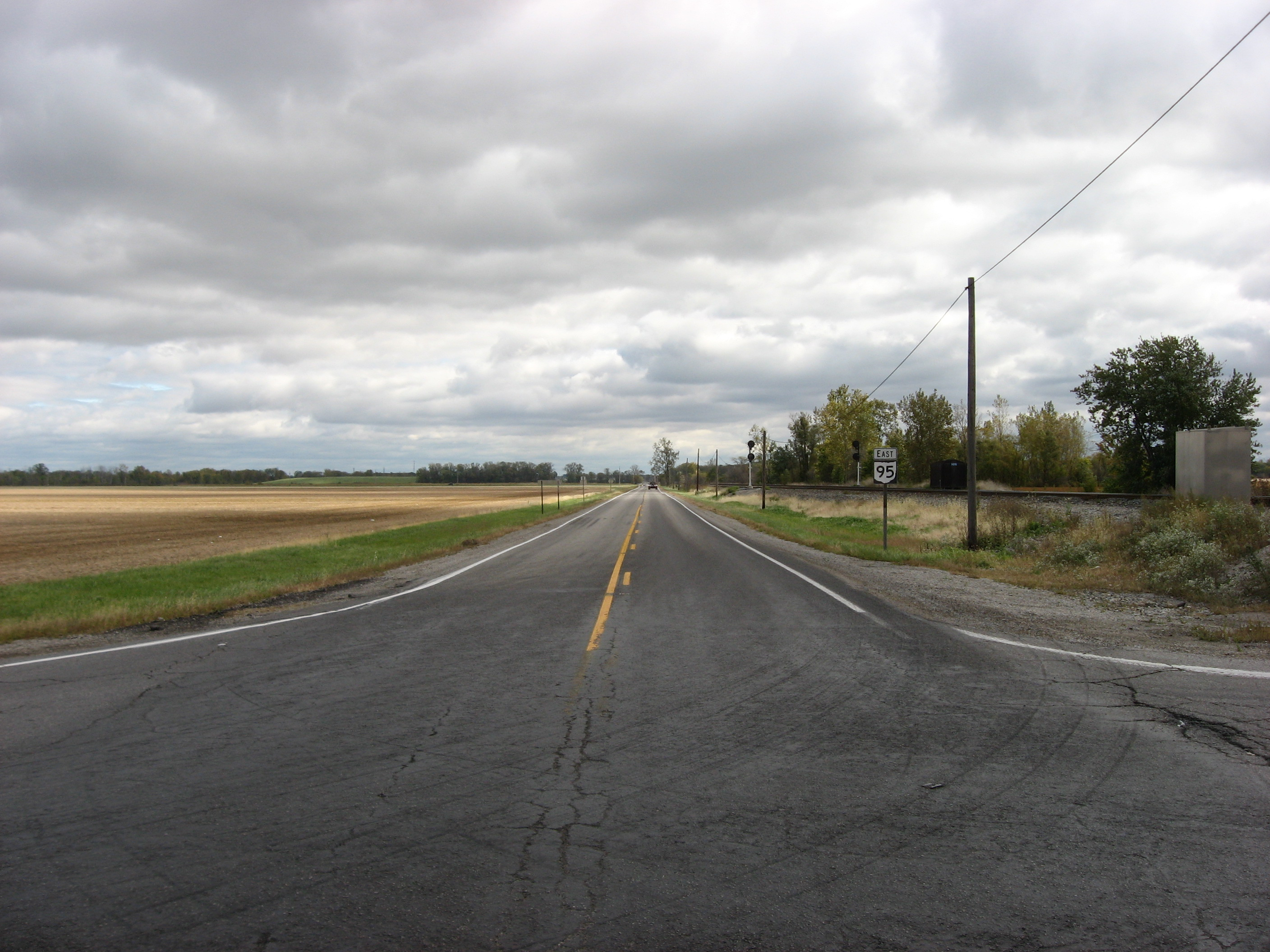
State Route 95 in rural western Marion County

State Route 95 (SR 95) is an east–west state highway in the central part of the U.S. state of Ohio. Its western terminus is in LaRue at SR 37 and its eastern terminus is at SR 3 just south of Wooster.

== Major intersections ==
County	Location	mi	km	Destinations	Notes
Marion	La Rue	0.00	0.00	SR 37 (High Street) / Market Street	
Marion	Big Island Township	9.87	15.88	SR 203 – Prospect	
Marion	Marion	13.95	22.45	SR 309 west (Kenton Avenue)	Western end of SR 309 eastbound concurrency
Marion	Marion	15.10	24.30	SR 4 south / SR 423 south / SR 739 south (Prospect Street)	Northern terminus of SR 739
Marion	Marion	15.26	24.56	SR 4 north / SR 423 north (State Street)	
Marion	Marion	15.40	24.78	SR 95 west (Vine Street) / SR 309 east (Church Street)	Eastern end of SR 309 eastbound concurrency
Marion	Marion	16.69	26.86	SR 529 east (Richland Road) / Merchant Avenue	Western terminus of SR 529
Marion	Marion Township	18.01– 18.13	28.98– 29.18	US 23 – Delaware, Upper Sandusky	Interchange
Marion	Claridon Township	19.97	32.14	SR 98 – Waldo, Bucyrus	
Marion	Claridon Township	24.09	38.77	SR 746 – Caledonia	
Morrow	Mount Gilead	31.24	50.28	SR 95A east (Marion Street)	Western terminus of SR 95A
Morrow	Mount Gilead	32.07	51.61	US 42 / SR 61 (Main Street)	
Morrow	Mount Gilead	32.37	52.09	SR 95A west (Marion Street) / Bank Street	Eastern terminus of SR 95A
Morrow	Franklin Township	39.18– 39.28	63.05– 63.22	I-71 – Columbus, Cleveland	Exit 151 (I-71)
Morrow	Chesterville	41.37	66.58	SR 314 (Portland Street)	
Knox	Fredericktown	48.39– 48.50	77.88– 78.05	SR 13 – Mount Vernon, Mansfield	Interchange
Richland	Butler	59.66	96.01	SR 97 west (Main Street) / Newville Street – Bellville	Western end of SR 97 concurrency
Richland	Butler	59.84	96.30	SR 97 east (Cleveland Street) / Liberty Street – Loudonville	Eastern end of SR 97 concurrency
Richland	Monroe Township	64.78	104.25	SR 603 north – Mifflin, Malabar Farm State Park	Southern terminus of SR 603
Ashland	Perrysville	68.26	109.85	SR 39 – Loudonville, Lucas	
Ashland	Green Township	73.28	117.93	SR 60 – Hayesville, Ashland, Loudonville	
Ashland	Mohican Township	76.50	123.11	SR 179 – Hayesville, Lakeville	
Ashland	Mohican Township	76.96	123.86	SR 89 north – Jeromesville	Southern terminus of SR 89
Wayne	Wooster Township	89.04	143.30	SR 3 / CR 95A (Blachlesville Road) – Wooster, Loudonville	
1.000 mi = 1.609 km; 1.000 km = 0.621 mi: Concurrency terminus

== SR 95A ==
SR 95A is an 1.152-mile-long (1.854 km) alternate route of SR 95 in downtown Mount Gilead. SR 95 splits at the intersection of High Street and Marion Street in Mount Gilead. SR 95 runs east through Mount Gilead as High Street while SR 95A runs east through Mount Gilead as Marion Street, just a few blocks south of High Street. The two routes then intersect again, with Route 95A ending at SR 95 near River Cliff Cemetery.
