= Ohio State Route 529 =

State highway in Ohio, US

State Route 529

Route information
- Maintained by ODOT
- Length: 17.62 mi (28.36 km)
- Existed: 1939–present

Major junctions
- West end: SR 95 in Marion
- US 42 in Cardington
- East end: SR 61 / CR 23 near Fulton

Location
- Country: United States
- State: Ohio
- Counties: Marion, Morrow

Highway system
- Ohio State Highway System; Interstate; US; State; Scenic
← SR 528	→ SR 530

State Route 529 (SR 529) is a 17.62-mile-long (28.36 km) state highway in Marion and Morrow Counties, Ohio. The route connects the city of Marion at SR 95 to SR 61 just north of the village of Fulton by way of Cardington.

== Route description ==
SR 529 begins in the easternmost section of Marion at SR 95. The route heads southeast through the city and Marion Township passing through residential neighborhoods. At the intersection of Marion Cardington Road and Richland Road, the state route turns towards the east and passes under the US 23 freeway without an interchange. After this point, the route's surroundings become more rural as travels southeast towards Cardington. The road intersects SR 98 and SR 746 while in Marion County. After entering Morrow County, the route continues through rural farmlands before entering the village limits of Cardington on West Williams Street. SR 529 turns right onto Marion Street and intersects US 42 (Main Street) in the center of the village. The state route continues south until it reaches Nichols Street; here it turns left and eventually becomes Chesterville Avenue and exits the village. The route passes through more farmland before ending at an intersection with SR 61 and Morrow County Route 23.

== History ==
The Marion–SR 61 route was first designated as SR 529 in 1939. The route between Marion and Cardington was paved at the route's inception but the Cardington–SR 61 segment was gravel-paved between 1939 and 1949. No major changes have occurred since then.

== Major intersections ==
County	Location	mi	km	Destinations	Notes
Marion	Marion	0.00	0.00	SR 95 (Mt. Vernon Avenue)	
Marion	Richland Township	4.10	6.60	SR 98 (Columbus-Sandusky Road) – Bucyrus, Waldo	Roundabout
Marion	Richland Township	9.04	14.55	SR 746 (South Caledonia-Ashley Road) – Caledonia	
Morrow	Cardington	13.25	21.32	US 42 (Main Street)	
Morrow	Lincoln Township	17.62	28.36	SR 61 / CR 23 (Cardington-Chesterville Road) – Mount Gilead, Sunbury	
1.000 mi = 1.609 km; 1.000 km = 0.621 mi
