= Ohio State Route 203 =

State highway in central Ohio, US

State Route 203

Route information
- Maintained by ODOT
- Length: 22.10 mi (35.57 km)
- Existed: 1923–present

Major junctions
- South end: SR 37 near Delaware
- SR 4 near Green Camp
- North end: SR 309 near Marion

Location
- Country: United States
- State: Ohio
- Counties: Delaware, Marion

Highway system
- Ohio State Highway System; Interstate; US; State; Scenic
← SR 202	→ SR 204

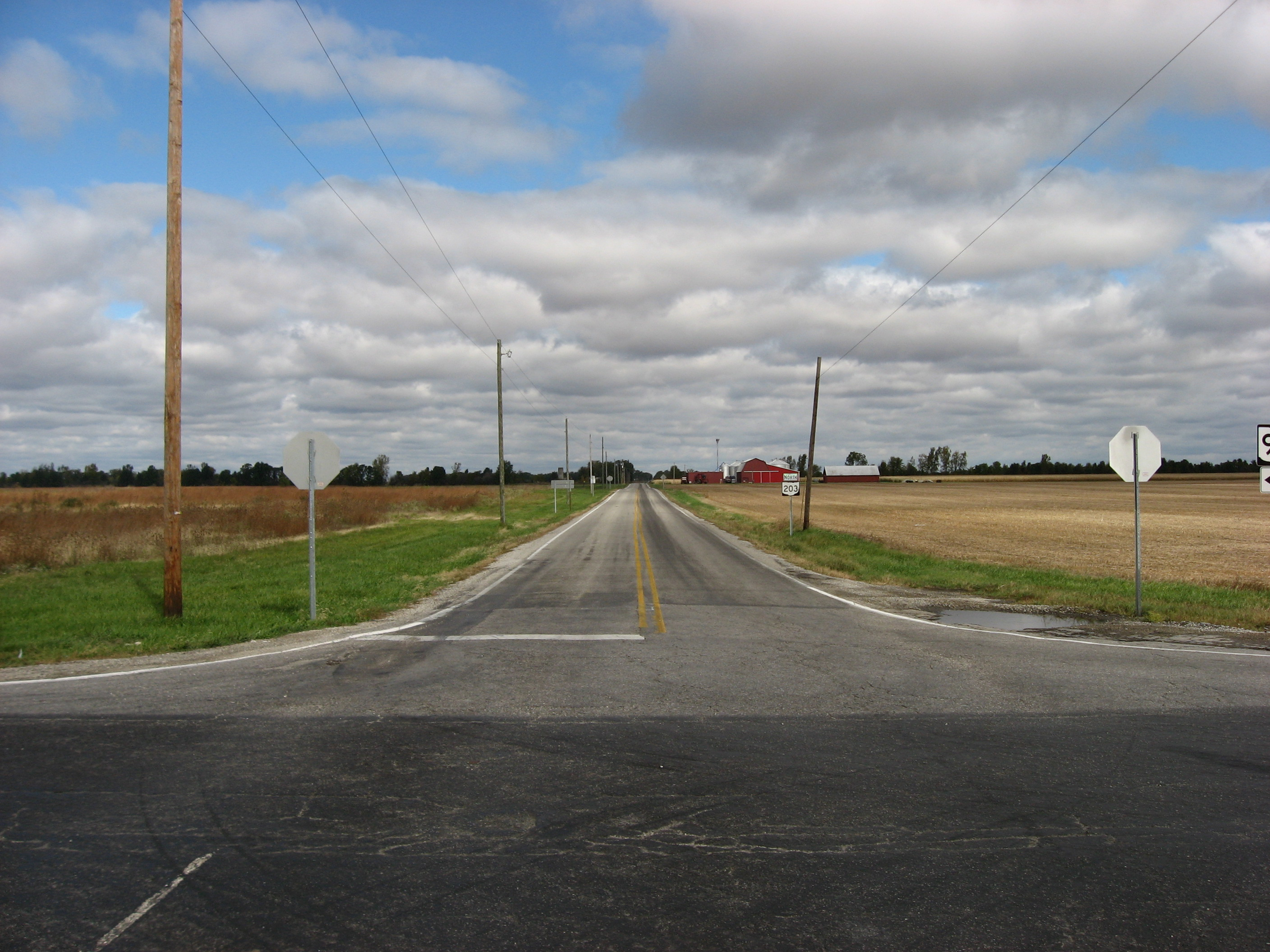
SR 203 in rural western Marion County, looking south from the SR 95 intersection

State Route 203 (SR 203, OH 203) is a 22.14-mile (35.63 km) long north–south state highway in the central portion of the U.S. state of Ohio. The southern terminus of SR 203 is at a four-way stop intersection with SR 37 just 0.50 miles (0.80 km) northwest of the city limits of Delaware. Its northern terminus is at SR 309 approximately 4 miles (6.4 km) northwest of Marion.

== Route description ==
SR 203 traverses the northwestern portion of Delaware County and the southern half of Marion County. There are no segments of SR 203 that are included within the National Highway System, a network of highways deemed to be most important for the economy, mobility and defense of the country.

== History ==
SR 203 was established in 1923. The highway was originally routed along its current alignment between its present southern terminus, at the time designated as SR 47, and its junction with what is now SR 739, but in 1923 known as SR 38. In 1938, SR 203 was extended north to its present terminus at what is now SR 309, but at the time a part of the now-defunct U.S. Route 30S (US 30S).

== Major intersections ==
County	Location	mi	km	Destinations	Notes
Delaware	Radnor Township	0.00	0.00	SR 37 / South Section Line Road – Delaware, Magnetic Springs	
Marion	Prospect	9.88	15.90	SR 47 (Water Street)	
Marion	Pleasant Township	12.34	19.86	SR 4 – Marion, Marysville	
Marion	Green Camp Township	16.84	27.10	SR 739 – Marion, Green Camp	
Marion	Big Island Township	20.28	32.64	SR 95 – Marion, LaRue	
Marion	Big Island Township	22.10	35.57	SR 309 – Marion, Kenton	
1.000 mi = 1.609 km; 1.000 km = 0.621 mi
