= Ohio State Route 746 =

State highway in central Ohio, US

State Route 746

Route information
- Maintained by ODOT
- Length: 13.00 mi (20.92 km)
- Existed: 1937–present

Major junctions
- South end: US 42 near Ashley
- North end: SR 309 in Caledonia

Location
- Country: United States
- State: Ohio
- Counties: Morrow, Marion

Highway system
- Ohio State Highway System; Interstate; US; State; Scenic
← SR 745	→ SR 747

State Route 746 (SR 746) is a north–south thirteen-mile-long (21 km) state highway located in central Ohio, a U.S. state. Its southern terminus is at U.S. Route 42 (US 42) approximately three miles (4.8 km) north of Ashley, and its northern terminus is at SR 309 in Caledonia.

== Route description ==
The majority of SR 746's route lies within rural territory, passing amid a vastness of farmland. Beginning at the intersection of US 42 and County Road 155 (CR 155) in Westfield Township, Morrow County, SR 746 runs westerly for a short distance, crossing CR 156 before turning north at the CR 153 intersection. SR 746 passes intersections with CR 25, Helmlich Road, Beatty Road and County Road 148 before entering Marion County, and correspondingly, Richland Township. Running inside of the Morrow–Marion county line by approximately one-quarter mile (0.40 km), SR 746 continues northerly past intersections with CR 123 and CR 154 prior to intersecting SR 529. Next, the state highway meets CR 161, followed by CR 169, where it enters Claridon Township. North of there, SR 746 meets SR 95, then crosses Roberts Road and Marion-Williamsport Road before bending to the northwest as it goes over the Olentangy River. SR 746 turns north again where it intersects CR 163, and comes to an end just after it enters Caledonia at its intersection with SR 309.

== History ==
In 1937, SR 746 was established along its current alignment between US 42 and SR 309. Other than the fact that when first designated, the highway intersecting SR 746 at its northern terminus was US 30S instead of SR 309, there have been no major changes to SR 746.

== Major intersections ==
County	Location	mi	km	Destinations	Notes
Morrow	Westfield Township	0.00	0.00	US 42 / CR 155 (Waldo-Fulton Road) – Mount Gilead, Delaware	
Marion	Richland Township	5.49	8.84	SR 529 (Marion-Cardington Road) – Marion, Cardington	
Marion	Claridon Township	9.71	15.63	SR 95 (Marion-Mt. Gilead Road) – Marion, Mount Gilead	
Marion	Caledonia	13.00	20.92	SR 309 (Harding Highway) / South Water Street – Marion, Galion	
1.000 mi = 1.609 km; 1.000 km = 0.621 mi
