= Gast Corner, Ohio =

- Unincorporated community
- Location within Ohio Location within the United States
- Coordinates: 40°27′00″N 83°13′18″W
- Country: United States
- State: Ohio
- County: Marion
- Township: Prospect
- Elevation: 929 ft (283 m)
- Time zone: UTC-5 (Eastern (EST))
  - Summer (DST): UTC-4 (EDT)
- ZIP Codes: 43342 (Prospect); 43344 (Richwood)
- Area code: 740
- GNIS feature ID: 1062778

Gast Corner is an unincorporated community in Prospect Township, Marion County, Ohio, United States. It is located west of Prospect at the intersection of Ohio State Routes 4 and 47.
