= Claridon Township, Ohio =

Claridon Township, Ohio may refer to:

- Claridon Township, Geauga County, Ohio
- Claridon Township, Marion County, Ohio
