= Radnor, Ohio =

- Census-designated place
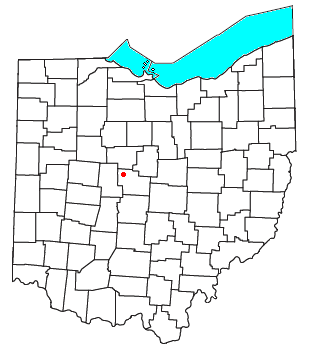
- Location of Radnor in Ohio
- Coordinates: 40°23′07″N 83°08′45″W
- Country: United States
- State: Ohio
- County: Delaware
- Township: Radnor

Area
  - Total: 0.72 sq mi (1.87 km^{2})
  - Land: 0.72 sq mi (1.87 km^{2})
  - Water: 0 sq mi (0.00 km^{2})
- Elevation: 938 ft (286 m)

Population (2020)
  - Total: 180
  - Density: 249.7/sq mi (96.42/km^{2})
- Time zone: UTC-5 (Eastern (EST))
  - Summer (DST): UTC-4 (EDT)
- ZIP code: 43066
- Area code: 740
- FIPS code: 39-65298
- GNIS feature ID: 2628956

Radnor is an unincorporated community and census-designated place (CDP) in central Radnor Township, Delaware County, Ohio, United States. As of the 2020 census it had a population of 180. Radnor has a post office with the ZIP code of 43066. It lies along State Route 203 at its intersection with Radnor Road.

== History ==
Radnor was originally known as "Delhi", and under the latter name was laid out in 1833. Prior to being called Delhi, the town was called New Baltimore. New Baltimore existed as early as 1814. The present name was taken from Radnor Township.The Radnor area history from 1802 until 1825 is greatly affected by David Pugh, a Welshman from Radnorshire, Wales. Young David Pugh left Wales early in 1801 and landed in Philadelphia. He took up residence in Baltimore, Maryland for about a year working and learning English. He met a fellow Welshman, Dr. Samuel Jones who had received several acres of land for his service in the Revolutionary War. Dr. Jones also acquired additional land warrants for his service in the Revolutionary War. Using acquired 25 land warrants, Dr. Jones purchased one quarter township (4,000 acres) of land in 1798. The land was located in Ohio Federal township six of range twenty in an area that was to become Radnor Township, Delaware County, Ohio.

Early in 1802 Dr. Jones employed David Pugh to go to Ohio to scout and survey the 4,000 acres. As was the custom of the day the surveyor received land as payment for the survey. David received 2,000 acres apparently in the Welsh Hills area near Reynoldsburg, Ohio. After a two- month journey on horseback David Pugh arrived near Franklinton, Ohio (now a part of Columbus). He hired a local scout to take him up river to the land owned by Dr. Jones. Mr. Pugh’s letters indicated that he established a settlement named Carpenter (now in Licking County) as his headquarters for several week during the summer of 1802.

Mr. Pugh recognized the value of the land he was surveying and returned to Philadelphia in the fall of 1802 with an offer to buy the 4,000 acres. Dr. Jones was older and recognized David Pugh a worthy citizen and accepted his offer. Dr. Jones sold Pugh 3,505 acres of the 4,000 acres for $2,650. The other 495 acres had already been sold by Dr. Jones and Mr. Pugh was to locate the 495 acres in his survey and convey it to those identified by Dr. Jones.

David Pugh’s deed for 4,000 acres was made in Philadelphia and was recorded on February 23, 1803 in Franklin County, Ohio. In 1808 the land was sectioned off from Frankly County and became Delaware County.

In 1803 David Pugh traveled back to Wales and convinced two of his sisters and their husbands to emigrate. This event allowed many of the current Radnor families to claim the Pugh family as part of their ancestry.

David Pugh lived in the area only a short time. He married Jane Murphy about 1808 and by 1815 they had moved to the Welsh-Hills community around what is now Reynoldsburg, Ohio. They lived there the rest of their lives.

Pugh platted forty-one hundred acre lots from the 4,000 acres and then platted about 150 acres of the 4,000 into a village he called New Baltimore.

Another Welshman, Henry Perry, purchased the first one hundred-acre plot (lot 1 of tier 2) of the 4,000 acres. Henry, his wife Margaret and their children may have built the first family cabin in the area now near the northeast corner of Route 203 and Penry road. There is still a dug well there that is said to have been Perry’s well.

The village of New Baltimore did not thrive and Pugh sold the 150 acres as farm land to Thomas Morton, Sr., in 1810. By 1825 a major portion of the 40 lots were under cultivation and Radnor Township was a thriving farming community. The New Baltimore plat name survived until Edward Evans surveyed additional lots in 1833 and called the village Delhi. Pugh still owned some land of the original 4,000 acres up through 1850 but had moved on and was no longer part of the community.

https://www.radnorheritagesociety.org/about-radnor-ohio Article by Joseph Preston, Historian & Genealogist, Radnor Heritage Society Inc. and Museum

== Demographics ==
Historical population
Census	Pop.	Note	%±
2020	180		—
U.S. Decennial Census
