= Terradise =

Nature preserve in Caledonia, Ohio

Coordinates: 40°37′02″N 82°58′28″W

Terradise is a nature preserve in Caledonia, Ohio. Its name (meaning a combination of heaven and earth) was coined by Raymond F. Romine who purchased 18 acres of land along the Olentangy River and built a house there with his wife Trella Hemmerly Haldeman Romine in 1953. Trella Romine donated 12 acres of the property situated on the left bank of the river to the people of Marion County in 1998. Known as the Terradise Nature Preserve, it is administered by Marion County Parks. A further two acres were donated to the preserve in 2004 by Ralph Boger, a neighboring farmer, and included a former spring and ford across the river. The Ohio Department of Natural Resources designated Terradise as an "outstanding environmental education area that possesses exceptional value in illustrating and interpreting the natural heritage of Ohio."

Trella Romine lived in the house at Terradise until her death in 2013 at the age of 97.

The home and the six remaining acres of the original tract were donated to the non-profit Terradise Nature Center, Inc. in 2018.
