= List of Superfund sites in Ohio =

This is a list of Superfund sites in Ohio designated under the Comprehensive Environmental Response, Compensation, and Liability Act (CERCLA) environmental law. The CERCLA federal law of 1980 authorized the United States Environmental Protection Agency (EPA) to create a list of polluted locations requiring a long-term response to clean up hazardous material contaminations. These locations are known as Superfund sites, and are placed on the National Priorities List (NPL).

The NPL guides the EPA in "determining which sites warrant further investigation" for environmental remediation. As of November 29, 2010, there were 34 Superfund sites on the National Priorities List in Ohio. Eight additional sites are currently proposed for entry on the list. Seven sites have been cleaned up and removed from the list.

== Superfund sites ==
Proposed for addition to National Priorities List
Deleted from National Priorities List

CERCLIS ID	Name	Town	County	Proposed	Listed	Construction completed	Partially deleted	Deleted	Citation
OH1170090004	Air Force Plant 85	Columbus	Franklin	01/18/1994	–	–	–	–	
OHD043730217	Allied Chemical & Ironton Coke	Ironton	Lawrence	12/30/1982	09/08/1983	–	–	–	
OHD057243610	Alsco Anaconda	Gnadenhutten	Tuscarawas	10/15/1984	06/10/1986	07/30/1996	–	11/05/2001	
OHD017506171	Arcanum Iron & Metal	Darke	Darke	12/30/1982	09/08/1983	12/09/1999	–	08/31/2001	
OHD074705930	Armco Incorporation-Hamilton Plant	Hamilton	Butler	04/30/2003	–	–	–	–	
OHN000510164	Behr Dayton Thermal System VOC Plume	Dayton	Montgomery	09/03/2008	04/09/2009	–	–	–	
OHD980611735	Big D Campground	Kingsville	Ashtabula	12/30/1982	09/08/1983	05/09/1995	–	–	
OHD980509616	Bowers Landfill	Circleville	Pickaway	12/30/1982	09/08/1983	12/17/1992	–	10/29/1997	
OHD980509657	Buckeye Reclamation	St Clairsville	Belmont	12/30/1982	09/08/1983	05/14/2003	–	–	
OHD980614549	Chemical & Minerals Reclamation	Cleveland	Cuyahoga	10/23/1981		12/30/1982	–	12/30/1982	
OHD074727793	Chem-Dyne	Hamilton	Butler	12/30/1982	09/08/1983	09/11/1992	–	–	
OH0000563122	Copley Square Plaza	Copley	Summit	09/23/2004	04/27/2005	–	–	–	
OHD980509830	Coshocton Landfill	Franklin	Coshocton	12/30/1982	09/08/1983	09/25/1995	–	10/07/1998	
OHD980611909	Diamond Shamrock Corp. (Painesville Works)	Painesville	Lake	05/10/1993	–	–	–	–	
OHD004210563	Dover Chemical Corp.	Dover	Tuscarawas	05/10/1993	–	–	–	–	
OHD980509947	E.H. Schilling Landfill	Hamilton	Lawrence	12/30/1982	09/08/1983	08/26/1993	–	–	
OHSFN0507962	East Troy Contaminated Aquifer	Troy	Miami	09/19/2007	09/03/2008	–	–	–	
OH6890008976	Feed Materials Production Center (USDOE)	Fernald	Butler and Hamilton	07/14/1989	11/21/1989	12/20/2006	–	–	
OHD980614572	Fields Brook	Ashtabula	Ashtabula						
OHD980794630	Fultz Landfill	Byesville	Guernsey						
OHD000377911	Industrial Excess Landfill	Uniontown	Stark						
OHD981785074	Krejci Dump	Boston Heights	Summit						
OHD981537582	Lammers Barrel Factory	Beavercreek	Greene						
OHD061722211	Laskin/Poplar Oil Co.	Jefferson	Ashtabula	12/30/1982	09/08/1983	09/23/1993	–	09/05/2000	
OHN000509950	Little Scioto River	Marion	Marion	04/09/2009	09/23/2009				
OHD980611800	Miami County Incinerator	Troy	Miami						
OHSFN0507973	Milford Contaminated Aquifer	Milford	Clermont	10/21/2010	–	–	–	–	
OH6890008984	Mound Plant (USDOE)	Miamisburg	Montgomery	07/14/1989	11/21/1989	09/28/2009	–	–	
OHD980610018	Nease Chemical	Salem	Columbiana						
OHN000509238	New Carlisle Landfill	New Carlisle	Clark	09/03/2008	04/09/2009	–	–	–	
OHD980794614	New Lyme Landfill	New Lyme	Ashtabula						
OHD980611875	North Sanitary Landfill	Dayton	Montgomery						
OHD980510200	Old Mill	Rock Creek	Ashtabula	12/30/1982	09/08/1983	09/30/1991	–	–	
OHD004379970	Ormet Corporation	Hannibal	Monroe						
OHD987051083	Peters Cartridge Factory	Kings Mills	Warren	04/30/2003	–	–	–	–	
OHD000382663	Powell Road Landfill	Dayton	Montgomery						
OHD076773712	Pristine, Inc.	Reading	Hamilton						
OHD980610042	Reilly Tar & Chemical Corp. (Dover Plant)	Dover	Tuscarawas	06/24/1988	08/30/1990	09/29/2000	–	–	
OHD980903447	Republic Steel Corp. Quarry	Elyria	Lorain	10/15/1984	06/10/1986	12/31/1992	–	11/12/2002	
OH3571924544	Rickenbacker Air National Guard Base (USAF)	Lockbourne	Franklin	01/18/1994	–	–	–	–	
OHD093895787	Sanitary Landfill Co. (Industrial Waste Disposal Co., Inc.)	Dayton	Montgomery	10/15/1984	06/10/1986	09/23/1998	–	–	
OHD063963714	Skinner Landfill	West Chester	Butler						
OHD980611388	South Dayton Dump & Landfill	Moraine	Montgomery	09/23/2004	–	–	–	–	
OHD071650592	South Point Plant	South Point	Lawrence						
OHD980609994	Summit National	Deerfield	Portage						
OHD004179339	TRW, Inc. (Minerva Plant)	Minerva	Stark						
OHD018392928	United Scrap Lead Co., Inc.	Troy	Miami						
OHD980612147	Union Carbide Corporation Site B Landfill	Marietta	Washington						
OHD980794606	Van Dale Junkyard	Marietta	Washington						
OHN000508132	West Troy Contaminated Aquifer QUIFER	Troy	Miami						
OH7571724312	Wright-Patterson Air Force Base	Dayton	Greene and Montgomery	06/24/1988	10/04/1989	09/29/1999	–	–	
OHD980794598	Zanesville Well Field	Zanesville	Muskingum						

== Superfund Alternative sites ==
Superfund Alternative sites are locations that have been found to be polluted enough to be listed on the National Priorities List, but are cleaned up through other methods without formal listing. These are not "Superfund" sites since they do not go through the Superfund listing process.

CERCLIS ID	Name	County	Reason	Pre-CERCLIS screening
OHD980510002	Ford Road Industrial Landfill	Lorain		01/01/1983

== See also ==
- List of Superfund sites in the United States
- List of environmental issues
- List of waste types
- TOXMAP
