= Bellaire Gardens, Ohio =

- Unincorporated community
- Location within Ohio Location within the United States
- Coordinates: 40°37′13″N 83°07′56″W
- Country: United States
- State: Ohio
- County: Marion
- Township: Marion
- Elevation: 955 ft (291 m)
- Time zone: UTC-5 (Eastern (EST))
  - Summer (DST): UTC-4 (EDT)
- ZIP Code: 43302 (Marion)
- Area code: 740
- GNIS feature ID: 1056219

Bellaire Gardens is an unincorporated community in Marion Township, Marion County, Ohio, United States. It is located north of Marion along Ohio State Route 4 (North Main Street) at the northern end of the State Route 4/State Route 423 overlap.
