= Ohio State Route 42 =

State Route 42

Route information
- Maintained by ODOT

Location
- Country: United States
- State: Ohio

Highway system
- Ohio State Highway System; Interstate; US; State; Scenic
← US 42	→ SR 43

In Ohio, State Route 42 may refer to:

- U.S. Route 42 in Ohio, the only Ohio highway numbered 42 since 1927
- Ohio State Route 42 (1923-1927), now SR 95 (Marion to Fredericktown), US 36 (Mount Vernon to Coshocton), and SR 541 (Coshocton to near Kimbolton)
