= Ohio State Route 423 =

State highway in Marion County, Ohio, US

State Route 423

Route information
- Maintained by ODOT
- Length: 17.09 mi (27.50 km)
- Existed: 1969–present

Major junctions
- South end: SR 47 / SR 98 in Waldo
- North end: US 23 / SR 231 near Morral

Location
- Country: United States
- State: Ohio
- Counties: Marion

Highway system
- Ohio State Highway System; Interstate; US; State; Scenic
← US 422	→ SR 424

State Route 423 (SR 423) is a 17.07-mile (27.47 km) long north–south state highway in the central portion of the U.S. state of Ohio. The southern terminus of SR 423 is in Waldo at a T-intersection that also serves as the eastern terminus of SR 47, as well as the southern terminus of SR 98. The signed northern terminus of SR 423 is at its junction with SR 231 nearly 3 miles (4.8 km) east of Morral. However, SR 423 is defined to continue northeast from this point along SR 231 for about 0.25 miles (0.40 km) before coming to an end at the U.S. Route 23 (US 23) expressway.

In Marion, SR 423 and SR 4 form a concurrency and split into two one-way pairs. Northbound SR 4/423 travels on State Street while southbound SR 4/423 (officially designated SR 4-D and SR 423-D) travel on Prospect Street.

== History ==
The route that SR 423 currently takes was signed in 1923 as SR 4, between Waldo and Marion and SR 22 north of Marion. The entire highway became US 23 in 1926. The route number was originally designated for a planned bypass around Portsmouth in the 1960s (now designated as Ohio State Route 823). Between 1967 and 1969, US 23 was moved onto a new four-lane highway and the old route of US 23 became SR 423.

== Major intersections ==
The entire route is in Marion County.

Location	mi	km	Destinations	Notes
Waldo	0.00	0.00	SR 47 west / SR 98 north	Southern terminus of SR 423
Marion	8.50	13.68	SR 4 south	Southern end of SR 4 concurrency
Marion	8.89	14.31	SR 739 south	Northern terminus of SR 739
Marion	9.07	14.60	SR 95 / SR 309	
Bellaire Gardens	11.37	18.30	SR 4 north	Northern end of SR 4 concurrency
Grand Prairie Township	16.37	26.34	SR 231 west	Southern end of SR 231 concurrency
Grand Prairie Township	16.66– 17.09	26.81– 27.50	US 23 / SR 231 east	Northern end of SR 231 concurrency; northern terminus of SR 423
1.000 mi = 1.609 km; 1.000 km = 0.621 mi: Concurrency terminus
