= Little Scioto River (Scioto River tributary) =

River in Ohio, United States

Coordinates: 40°31′21″N 83°12′19″W

The Little Scioto River is a tributary of the Scioto River, 27.2 miles (43.8 km) long, in central Ohio in the United States. Via the Scioto and Ohio Rivers, it is part of the watershed of the Mississippi River, draining an area of 111 square miles (290 km^{2}).

The Little Scioto rises south of Bucyrus in Crawford County, and flows generally southwestwardly into Marion County, passing to the west of the city of Marion. It flows into the Scioto River at Green Camp.

== Superfund site ==
The river was placed on the Environmental Protection Agency's National Priorities List on September 23, 2009. The river had been contaminated by the nearby Baker Wood Creosoting facility in Marion, Ohio. Cleanup at the site began in 2006, but designating the river a Superfund site in 2009 allowed the EPA to force the responsible parties to pay for the cleanup.

== Discharge ==
A USGS stream gauge on the river near Marion recorded a mean annual discharge of 74.95 cubic feet per second (2.122 m^{3}/s) during water years 1926-1935.

== See also ==
- List of rivers of Ohio
- List of Superfund sites in Ohio
