= Bowers Landfill =

- Superfund site
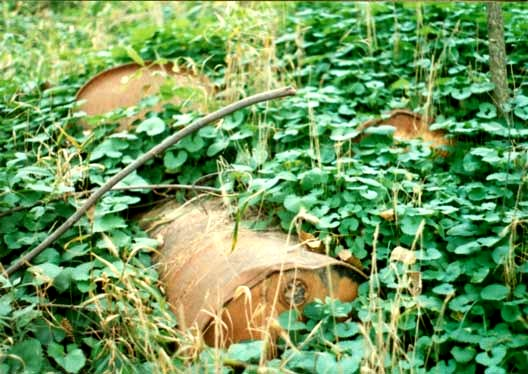
- Rusting chemical drums at Bowers Landfill, 1988.

- Location within Ohio
- Location: Circleville, Pickaway, Ohio; 39°38′15″N 82°57′50″W

Information
- CERCLIS ID: OHD980509616
- Contaminants: Ethylbenzene; Toluene; Xylene; Volatile organic compounds; Polychlorinated biphenyls; Polyaromatic hydrocarbons; Chromium; Lead; Pesticides
- Responsible parties: DuPont; PPG Industries

Progress
- Proposed: December 30, 1982
- Listed: September 8, 1983
- Construction completed: December 17, 1992
- Deleted: October 27, 1997

Bowers Landfill, also known as Island Road Landfill, is a former privately owned landfill site covering 12 acres (5 hectares) near Circleville, Ohio, on the Scioto River floodplain. The site operated between 1958 and 1968. Initially only domestic refuse was accepted, but in 1963 the site began accepting chemical waste from DuPont and PPG Industries. Waste was either dumped on the ground and covered with a layer of soil, or incinerated in the open air. Analysis of surface water undertaken by the United States Environmental Protection Agency in 1980 revealed the presence of contaminants and in 1983 the site was added to the National Priorities List (NPL) of hazardous waste sites eligible for long-term remedial action (cleanup) financed under the federal Superfund program. The site was cleaned up in 1993, removed from the NPL in 1997, and is still up for review every five years.

== History ==
The parcel of land on which the landfill was established was purchased by John M. Bowers, a local dental surgeon, in 1957. The following year Bowers began a sand and gravel quarrying operation on the eastern edge of the land adjacent to Island Road. Shortly afterwards, the portion of land between the quarry and the Scioto River was utilized as a landfill, with soil from the quarry used to cover the refuse.
