= Pleasant Township, Marion County, Ohio =

Township in Ohio, US

- Township
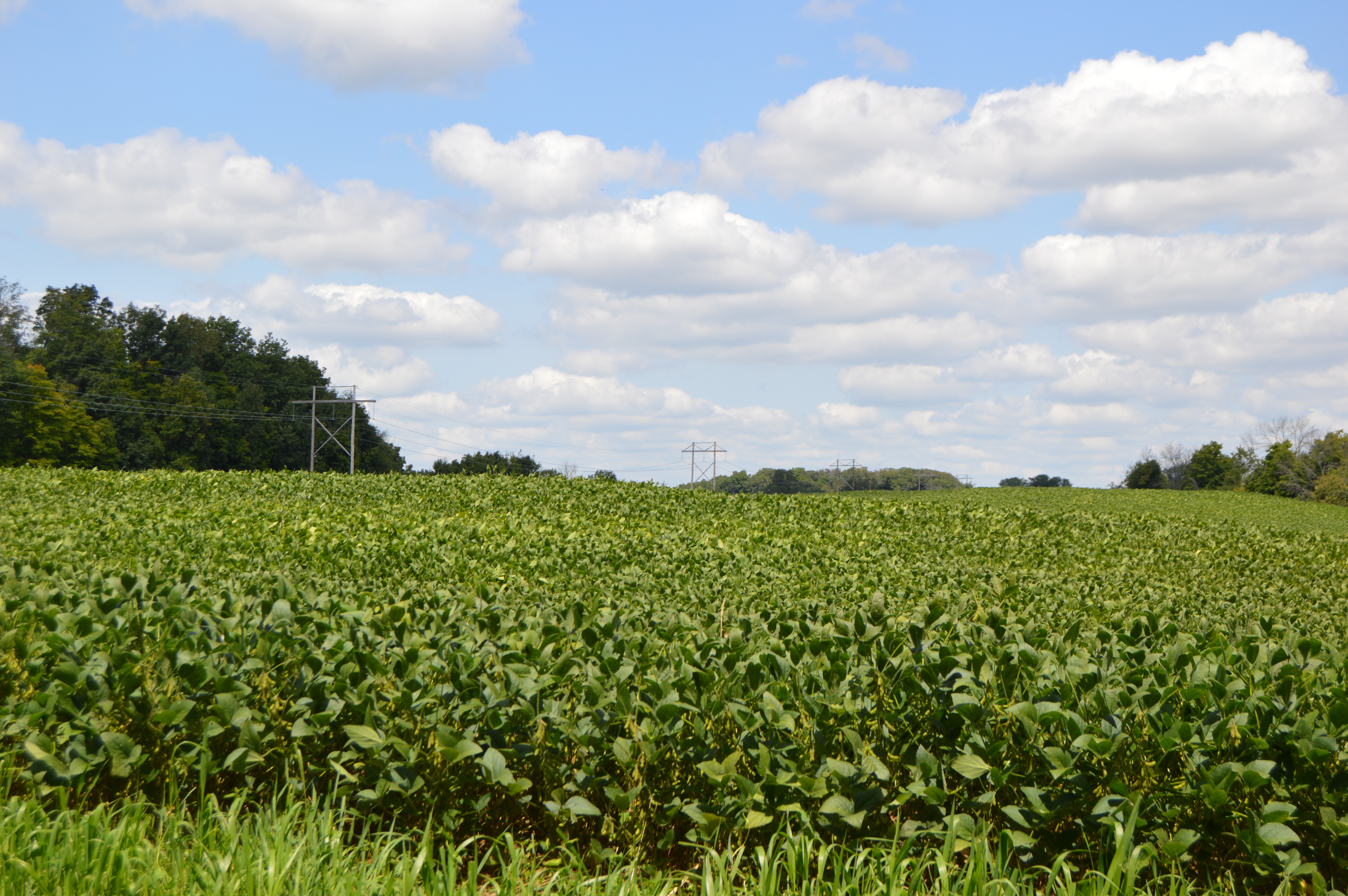
- Fields north of Prospect

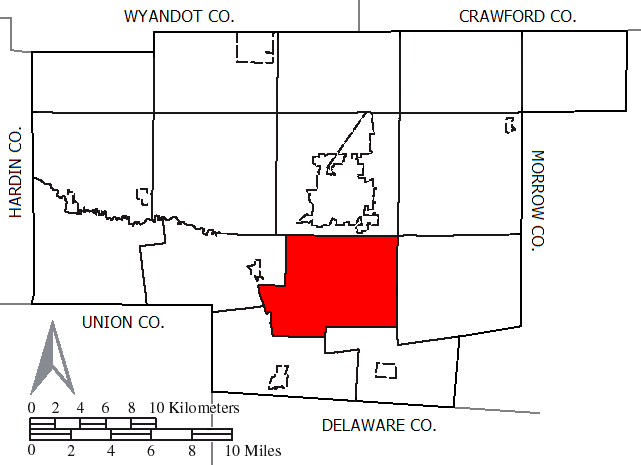
- Location of Pleasant Township in Marion County
- Coordinates: 40°30′54″N 83°8′28″W
- Country: United States
- State: Ohio
- County: Marion

Area
  - Total: 28.3 sq mi (73.4 km^{2})
  - Land: 28.3 sq mi (73.3 km^{2})
  - Water: 0.039 sq mi (0.1 km^{2})
- Elevation: 1,014 ft (309 m)

Population (2020)
  - Total: 4,939
  - Density: 175/sq mi (67.4/km^{2})
- Time zone: UTC-5 (Eastern (EST))
  - Summer (DST): UTC-4 (EDT)
- FIPS code: 39-63352
- GNIS feature ID: 1086582
- Website: http://www.pleasanttwpmarion.org/trustees.html

Pleasant Township is one of the fifteen townships of Marion County, Ohio, United States. The 2020 census found 4,939 people in the township.

== Geography ==
Located in the southern part of the county, it borders the following townships:

- Marion Township – north
- Claridon Township – northeast corner
- Richland Township – east
- Waldo Township – southeast
- Prospect Township – southwest
- Green Camp Township – west

No municipalities are located in Pleasant Township.

== Name and history ==
It is one of fifteen Pleasant Townships statewide.

== Government ==
The township is governed by a three-member board of trustees, who are elected in November of odd-numbered years to a four-year term beginning on the following January 1. Two are elected in the year after the presidential election and one is elected in the year before it. There is also an elected township fiscal officer, who serves a four-year term beginning on April 1 of the year after the election, which is held in November of the year before the presidential election. Vacancies in the fiscal officership or on the board of trustees are filled by the remaining trustees.
