= Green Camp, Ohio =

- Village
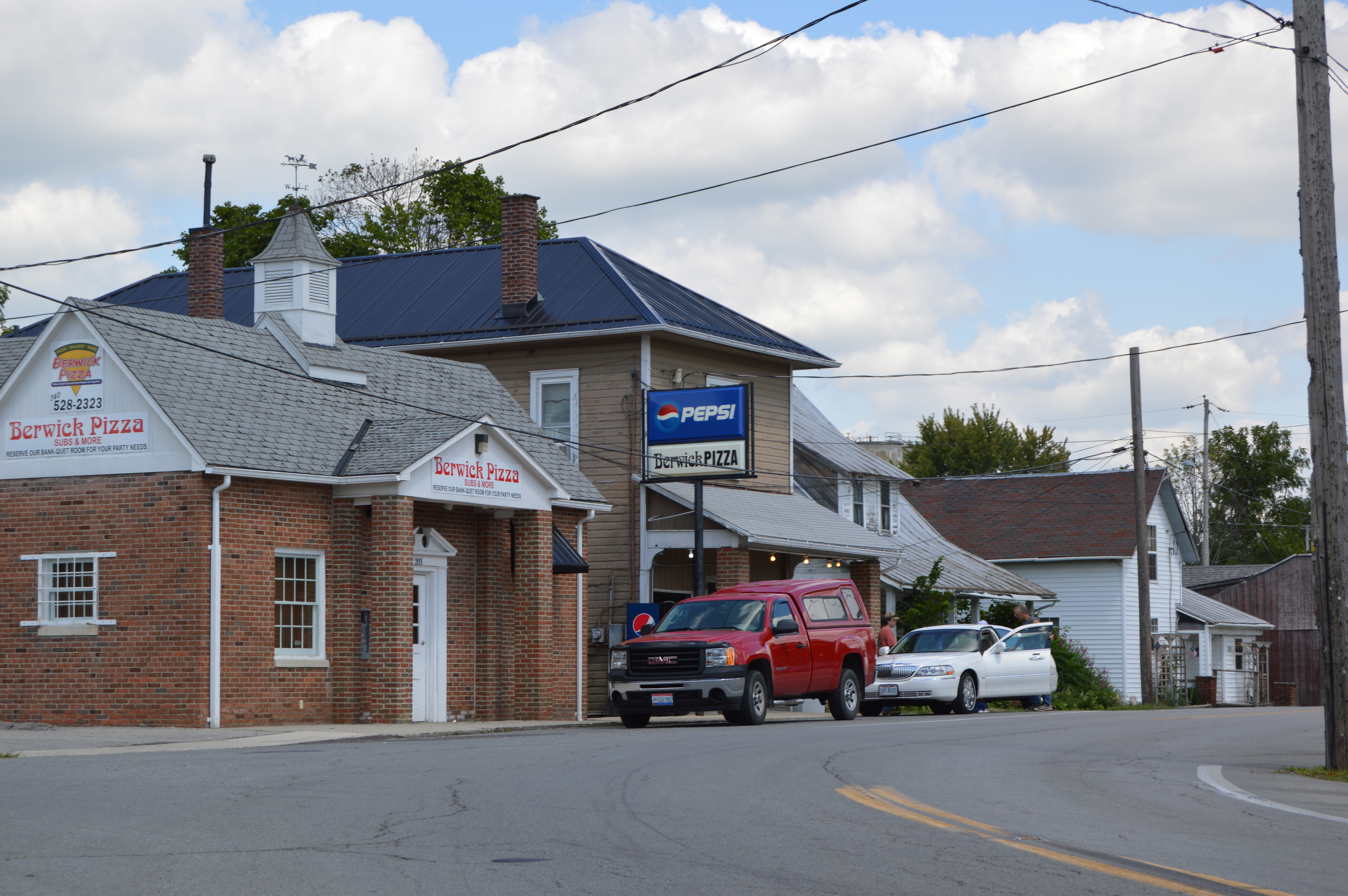
- Businesses on Main Street

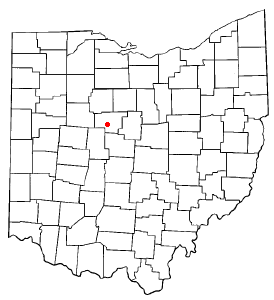
- Location of Green Camp, Ohio

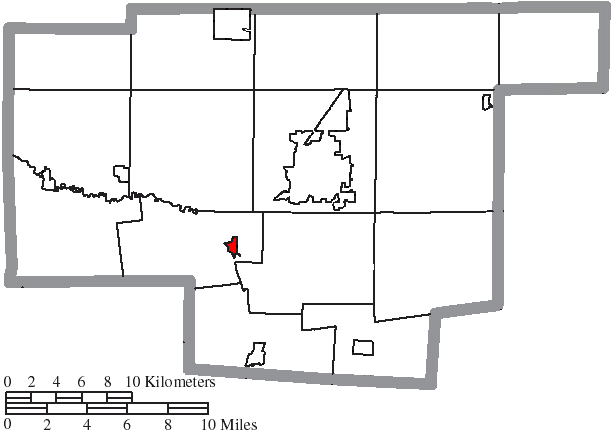
- Location of Green Camp in Marion County
- Coordinates: 40°31′55″N 83°12′27″W
- Country: United States
- State: Ohio
- County: Marion
- Township: Green Camp

Area
  - Total: 0.34 sq mi (0.88 km^{2})
  - Land: 0.34 sq mi (0.88 km^{2})
  - Water: 0 sq mi (0.00 km^{2})
- Elevation: 912 ft (278 m)

Population (2020)
  - Total: 310
  - Estimate (2023): 304
  - Density: 917/sq mi (354.2/km^{2})
- Time zone: UTC-5 (Eastern (EST))
  - Summer (DST): UTC-4 (EDT)
- ZIP code: 43322
- Area code: 740
- FIPS code: 39-31948
- GNIS feature ID: 2398201

Green Camp is a village in Marion County, Ohio, United States, standing at the confluence of the Scioto and Little Scioto Rivers. The population was 310 at the 2020 census. Green Camp is served by Elgin Local School District.

== History ==
Green Camp was originally called Berwick, and under the latter name was laid out in 1838. The present name is derived from Green Camp Township.

== Geography ==
According to the United States Census Bureau, the village has a total area of 0.34 square miles (0.88 km^{2}), all land.

== Demographics ==
Historical population
| Census | Pop. | Note | %± |
|---|---|---|---|
| 1880 | 312 | | — |
| 1890 | 290 | | −7.1% |
| 1900 | 369 | | 27.2% |
| 1910 | 308 | | −16.5% |
| 1920 | 278 | | −9.7% |
| 1930 | 362 | | 30.2% |
| 1940 | 327 | | −9.7% |
| 1950 | 388 | | 18.7% |
| 1960 | 492 | | 26.8% |
| 1970 | 537 | | 9.1% |
| 1980 | 475 | | −11.5% |
| 1990 | 393 | | −17.3% |
| 2000 | 342 | | −13.0% |
| 2010 | 374 | | 9.4% |
| 2020 | 310 | | −17.1% |
| 2023 (est.) | 304 | ▼ | −1.9% |
U.S. Decennial Census

=== 2010 census ===
As of the census of 2010, there were 374 people, 142 households, and 110 families residing in the village. The population density was 1,100.0 inhabitants per square mile (424.7/km^{2}). There were 155 housing units at an average density of 455.9 units per square mile (176.0 units/km^{2}). The racial makeup of the village was 96.5% White and 3.5% from two or more races. Hispanic or Latino of any race were 0.5% of the population.

There were 142 households, of which 35.9% had children under the age of 18 living with them, 54.9% were married couples living together, 14.8% had a female householder with no husband present, 7.7% had a male householder with no wife present, and 22.5% were non-families. 18.3% of all households were made up of individuals, and 10.5% had someone living alone who was 65 years of age or older. The average household size was 2.63 and the average family size was 2.99.

The median age in the village was 40 years. 25.7% of residents were under the age of 18; 6.9% were between the ages of 18 and 24; 27.7% were from 25 to 44; 25.7% were from 45 to 64; and 13.9% were 65 years of age or older. The gender makeup of the village was 54.3% male and 45.7% female.

=== 2000 census ===
As of the census of 2000, there were 342 people, 133 households, and 102 families residing in the village. The population density was 1,007.8 inhabitants per square mile (389.1/km^{2}). There were 140 housing units at an average density of 412.5 units per square mile (159.3 units/km^{2}). The racial makeup of the village was 99.71% White, and 0.29% from two or more races.

There were 133 households, out of which 31.6% had children under the age of 18 living with them, 59.4% were married couples living together, 9.8% had a female householder with no husband present, and 22.6% were non-families. 19.5% of all households were made up of individuals, and 8.3% had someone living alone who was 65 years of age or older. The average household size was 2.57 and the average family size was 2.92.

In the village, the population was spread out, with 24.9% under the age of 18, 10.8% from 18 to 24, 30.7% from 25 to 44, 16.4% from 45 to 64, and 17.3% who were 65 years of age or older. The median age was 35 years. For every 100 females there were 108.5 males. For every 100 females age 18 and over, there were 100.8 males.

The median income for a household in the village was $42,188, and the median income for a family was $51,250. Males had a median income of $29,861 versus $25,500 for females. The per capita income for the village was $18,244. About 9.8% of families and 9.1% of the population were below the poverty line, including 11.0% of those under age 18 and 10.0% of those age 65 or over.
