= Prospect Township, Marion County, Ohio =

Township in Ohio, US

- Township
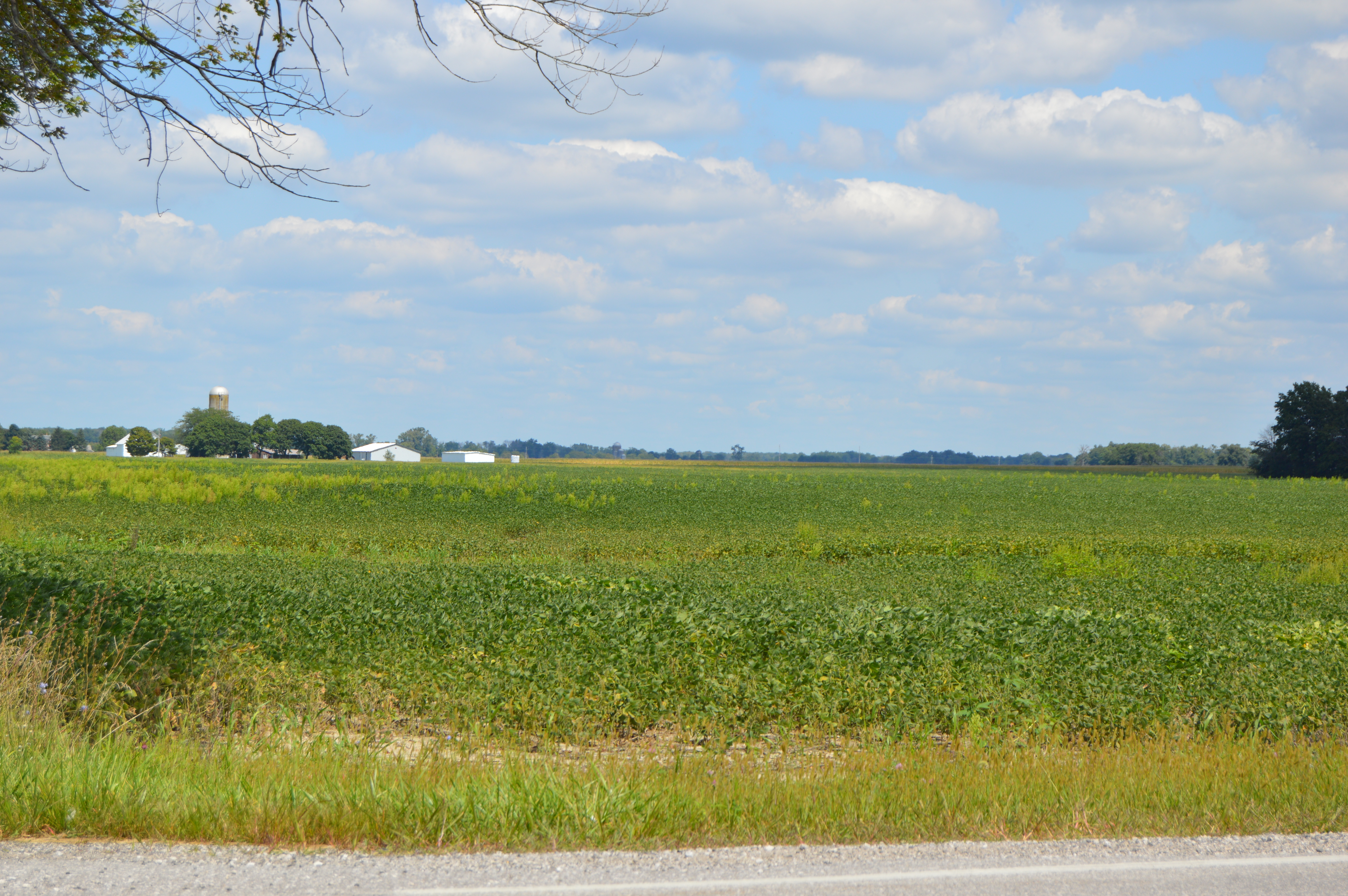
- Fields east of Prospect

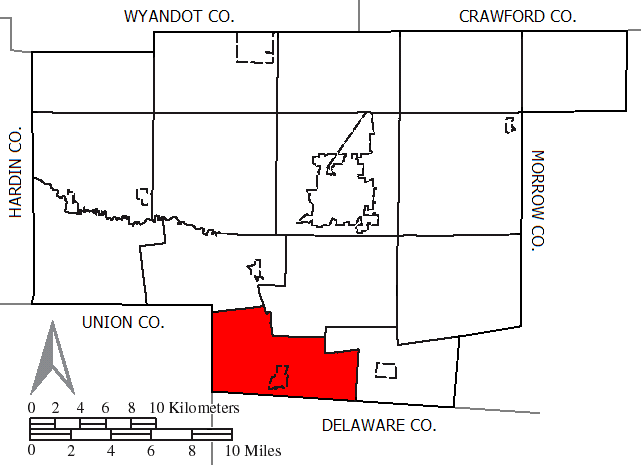
- Location of Prospect Township in Marion County
- Coordinates: 40°27′26″N 83°11′12″W
- Country: United States
- State: Ohio
- County: Marion

Area
  - Total: 24.3 sq mi (62.9 km^{2})
  - Land: 24.2 sq mi (62.8 km^{2})
  - Water: 0.077 sq mi (0.2 km^{2})
- Elevation: 928 ft (283 m)

Population (2020)
  - Total: 2,043
  - Density: 84.3/sq mi (32.5/km^{2})
- Time zone: UTC-5 (Eastern (EST))
  - Summer (DST): UTC-4 (EDT)
- ZIP code: 43342
- Area code: 740
- FIPS code: 39-64794
- GNIS feature ID: 1086583

Prospect Township is one of the fifteen townships of Marion County, Ohio, United States. The 2020 census found 2,043 people in the township, 1,067 of whom lived in the village of Prospect.

== Geography ==
Located in the southern part of the county, it borders the following townships:

- Pleasant Township - northeast
- Waldo Township - east
- Marlboro Township, Delaware County - southeast corner
- Radnor Township, Delaware County - south, east of Thompson Township
- Thompson Township, Delaware County - south, west of Radnor Township
- Claibourne Township, Union County - southwest
- Jackson Township, Union County - west
- Green Camp Township - northwest

The village of Prospect is located in southern Prospect Township.

== Name and history ==
It is the only Prospect Township statewide.

== Government ==
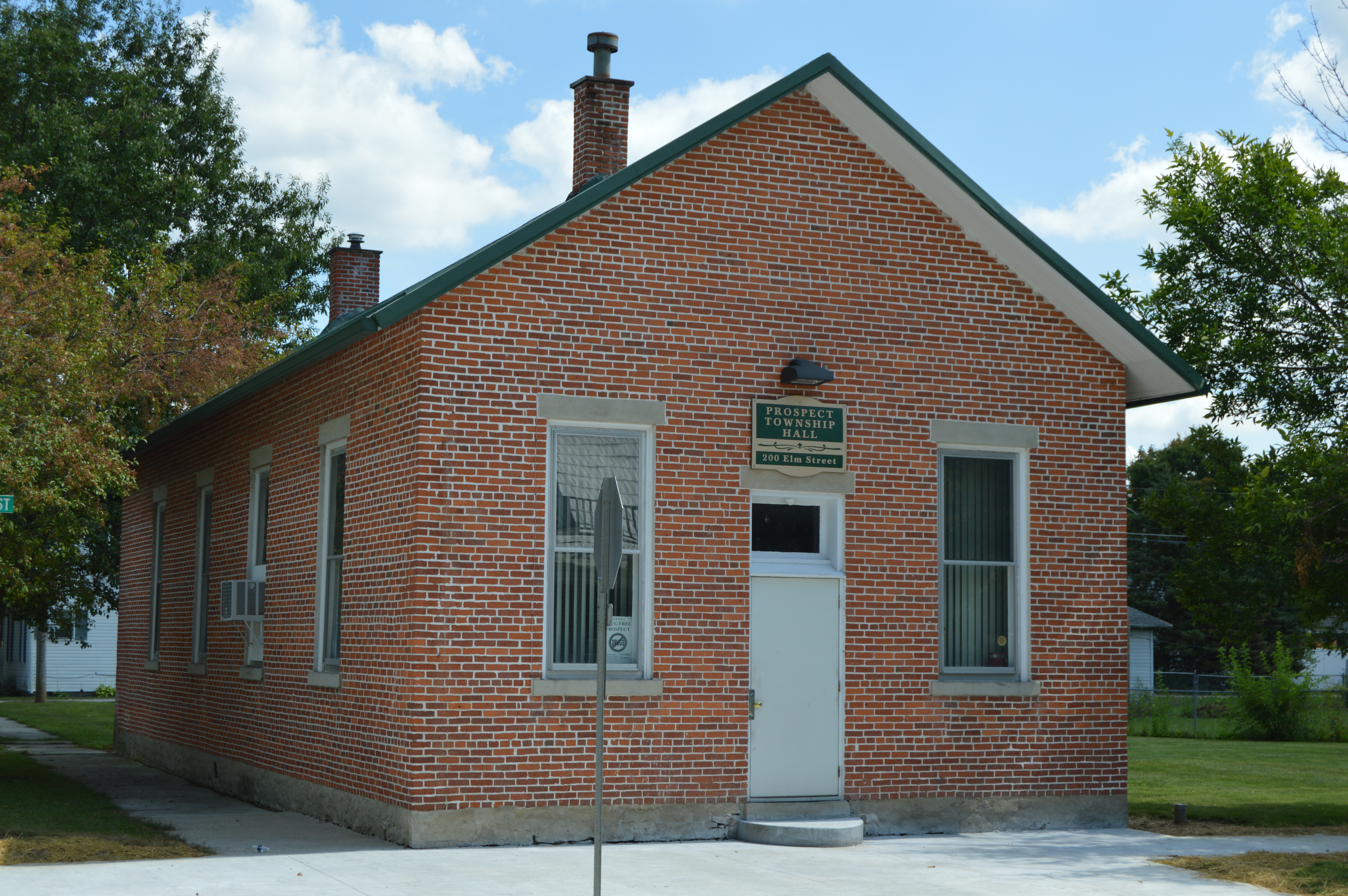
Prospect Town hall

The township is governed by a three-member board of trustees, who are elected in November of odd-numbered years to a four-year term beginning on the following January 1. Two are elected in the year after the presidential election and one is elected in the year before it. There is also an elected township fiscal officer, who serves a four-year term beginning on April 1 of the year after the election, which is held in November of the year before the presidential election. Vacancies in the fiscal officership or on the board of trustees are filled by the remaining trustees.
