= Green Camp Township, Marion County, Ohio =

Township in Ohio, US

- Township
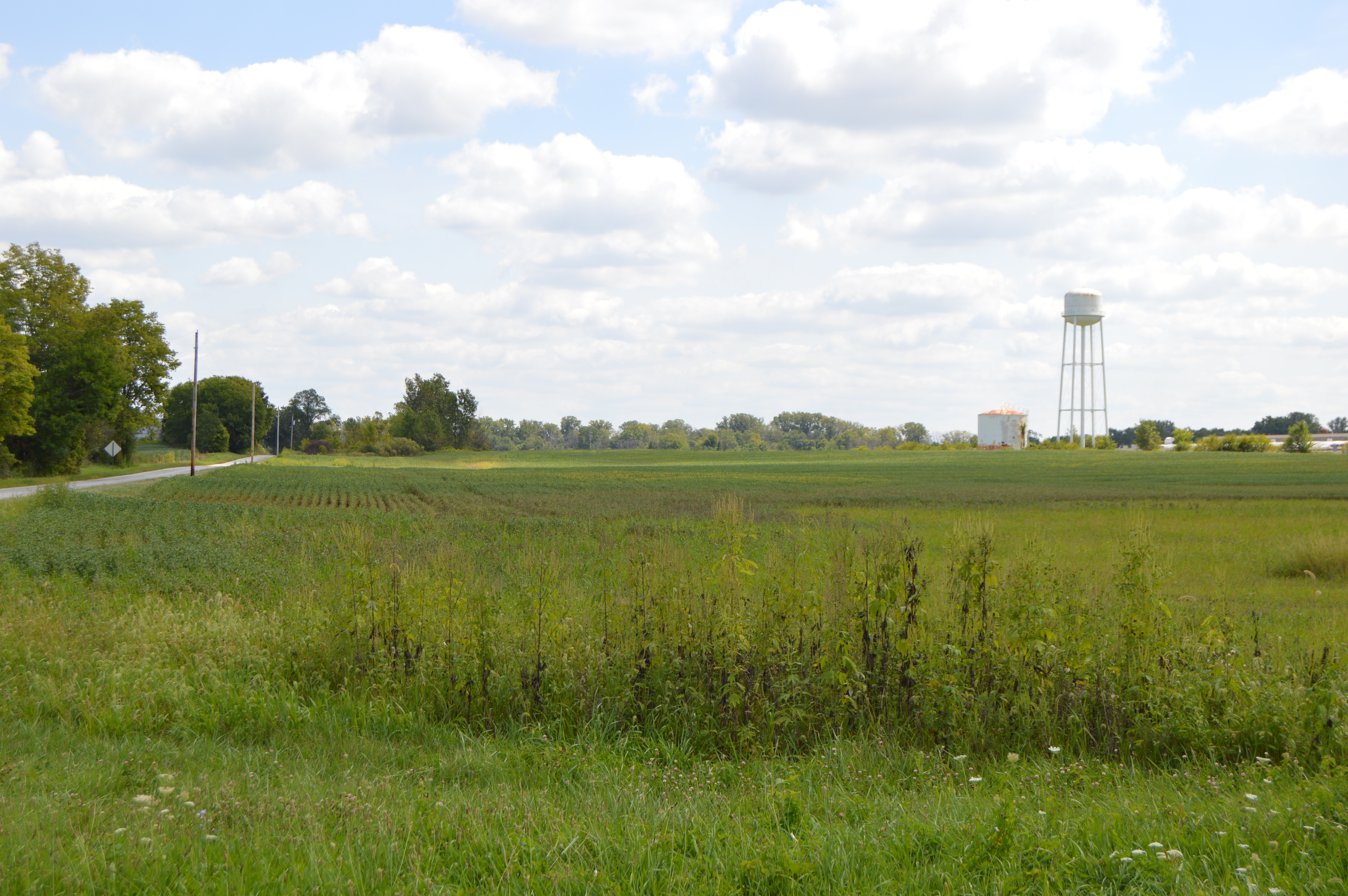
- Fields north of the village of Green Camp

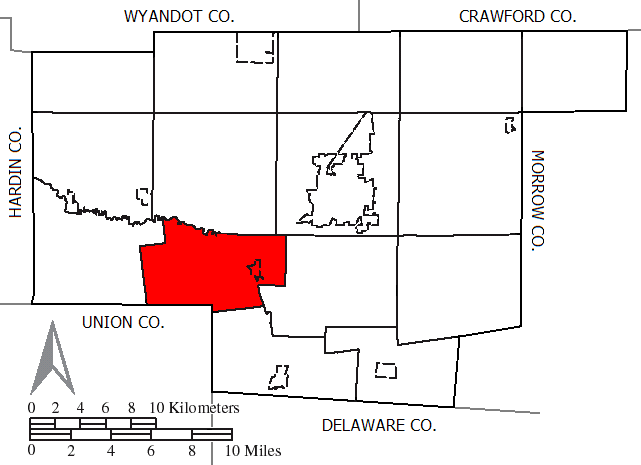
- Location of Green Camp Township in Marion County
- Coordinates: 40°31′40″N 83°13′58″W
- Country: United States
- State: Ohio
- County: Marion

Area
  - Total: 24.4 sq mi (63.1 km^{2})
  - Land: 24.4 sq mi (63.1 km^{2})
  - Water: 0 sq mi (0.0 km^{2})
- Elevation: 915 ft (279 m)

Population (2020)
  - Total: 1,080
  - Density: 44.3/sq mi (17.1/km^{2})
- Time zone: UTC-5 (Eastern (EST))
  - Summer (DST): UTC-4 (EDT)
- ZIP code: 43322
- Area code: 740
- FIPS code: 39-31962
- GNIS feature ID: 1086579

Green Camp Township is one of the fifteen townships of Marion County, Ohio, United States. The 2020 census found 1,080 people in the township, 310 of whom lived in the village of Green Camp.

== Geography ==
Located in the southwestern part of the county, it borders the following townships:

- Big Island Township - north
- Marion Township - northeast
- Pleasant Township - east
- Prospect Township - southeast
- Jackson Township, Union County - southwest
- Bowling Green Township - west

The village of Green Camp is located in eastern Green Camp Township.

== Name and history ==
It is the only Green Camp Township statewide.

== Government ==
The township is governed by a three-member board of trustees, who are elected in November of odd-numbered years to a four-year term beginning on the following January 1. Two are elected in the year after the presidential election and one is elected in the year before it. There is also an elected township fiscal officer, who serves a four-year term beginning on April 1 of the year after the election, which is held in November of the year before the presidential election. Vacancies in the fiscal officership or on the board of trustees are filled by the remaining trustees.
