= Radnor Township, Delaware County, Ohio =

Township in Ohio, US

- Township
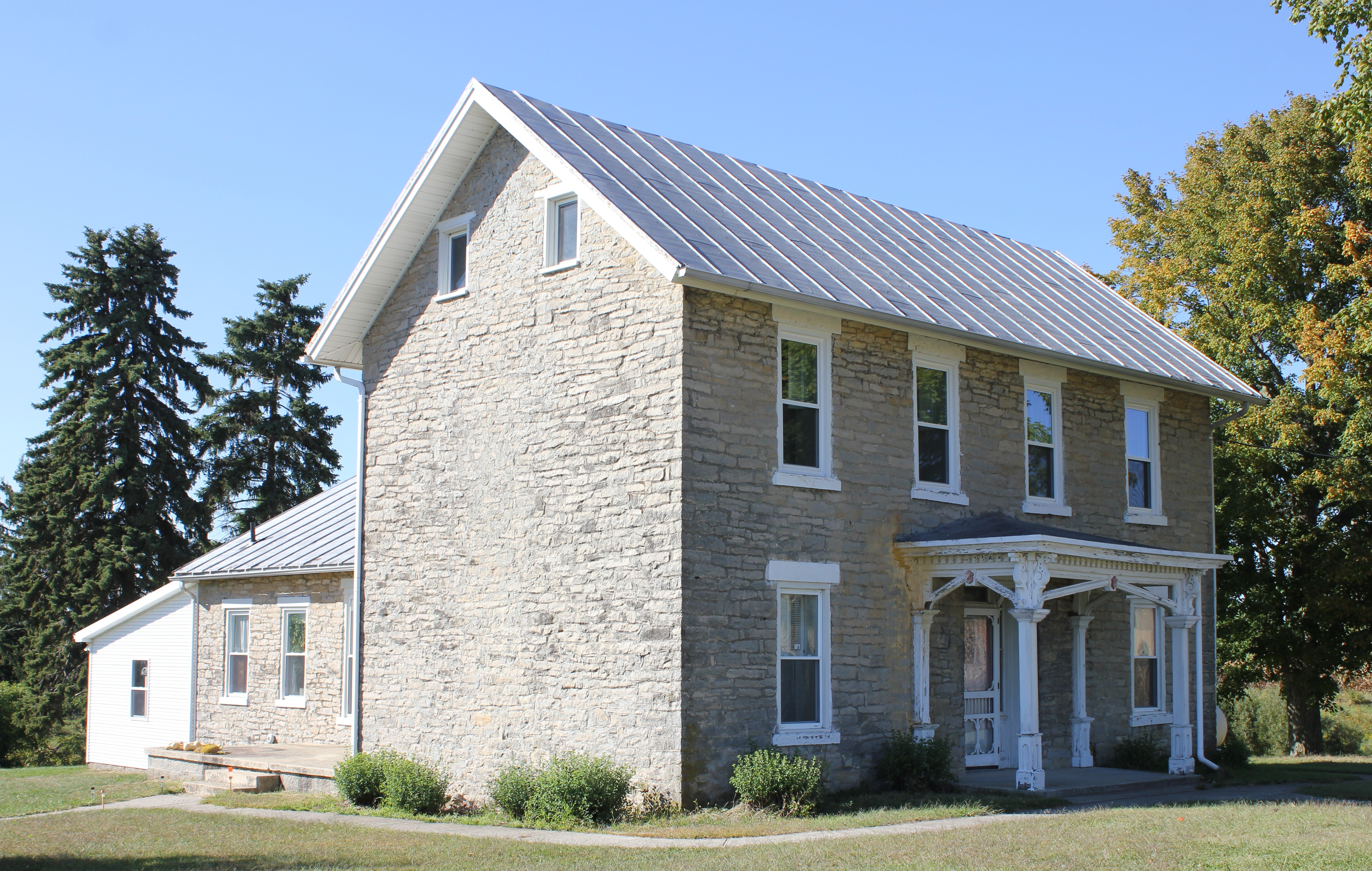
- Samuel Cooper Farmhouse

- Location of Radnor Township in Delaware County
- Coordinates: 40°22′59″N 83°9′23″W
- Country: United States
- State: Ohio
- County: Delaware

Area
  - Total: 31.2 sq mi (80.8 km^{2})
  - Land: 31.0 sq mi (80.4 km^{2})
  - Water: 0.15 sq mi (0.4 km^{2})
- Elevation: 948 ft (289 m)

Population (2020)
  - Total: 1,570
  - Density: 50.6/sq mi (19.5/km^{2})
- Time zone: UTC-5 (Eastern (EST))
  - Summer (DST): UTC-4 (EDT)
- ZIP code: 43066
- Area code: 740
- FIPS code: 39-65312
- GNIS feature ID: 1086055
- Website: radnortwp.org

Radnor Township is one of the eighteen townships of Delaware County, Ohio, United States. As of the 2020 census the population was 1,570.

== Geography ==
Located in the northwestern part of the county, it borders the following townships:

- Prospect Township, Marion County - north
- Waldo Township, Marion County - northeast corner
- Marlboro Township - northeast, south of Waldo Township
- Troy Township - east
- Delaware Township - southeast
- Scioto Township - southwest
- Thompson Township - west

No municipalities are located in Radnor Township, although the census-designated place of Radnor lies at the center of the township.

== Name and history ==
The name Radnor is derived from Radnorshire, Wales, the native land of a first settler. It is the only Radnor Township statewide.

== Government ==
The township is governed by a three-member board of trustees, who are elected in November of odd-numbered years to a four-year term beginning on the following January 1. Two are elected in the year after the presidential election and one is elected in the year before it. There is also an elected township fiscal officer, who serves a four-year term beginning on April 1 of the year after the election, which is held in November of the year before the presidential election. Vacancies in the fiscal officership or on the board of trustees are filled by the remaining trustees.

== Public services ==
Emergency medical services in Radnor Township are provided by the Delaware County EMS.
