= Waldo Township, Marion County, Ohio =

Township in Ohio, US

- Township
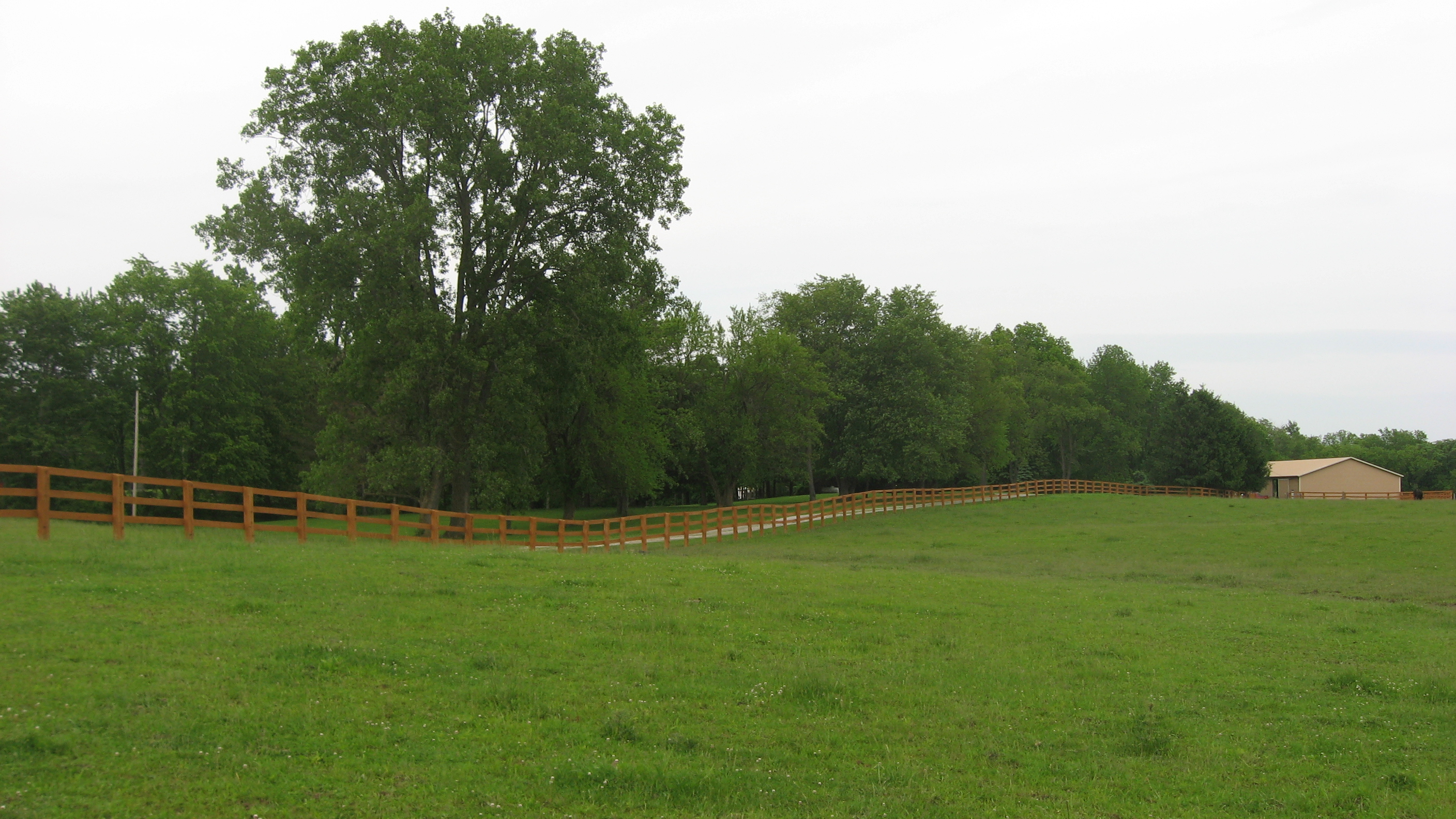
- Site of Fort Morrow north of Norton

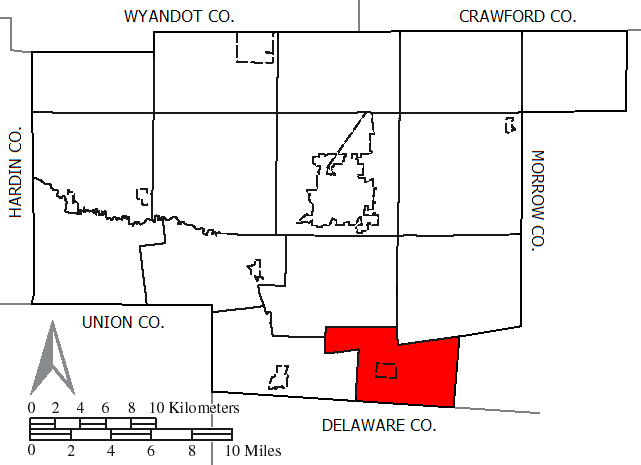
- Location of Waldo Township in Marion County
- Coordinates: 40°27′52″N 83°4′30″W
- Country: United States
- State: Ohio
- County: Marion

Area
  - Total: 18.9 sq mi (49.0 km^{2})
  - Land: 18.9 sq mi (48.9 km^{2})
  - Water: 0 sq mi (0.0 km^{2})
- Elevation: 955 ft (291 m)

Population (2020)
  - Total: 1,130
  - Density: 59.9/sq mi (23.1/km^{2})
- Time zone: UTC-5 (Eastern (EST))
  - Summer (DST): UTC-4 (EDT)
- ZIP code: 43356
- Area code: 740
- FIPS code: 39-80514
- GNIS feature ID: 1086588

Waldo Township is one of the fifteen townships of Marion County, Ohio, United States. The 2020 census found 1,130 people in the township, 326 of whom lived in the village of Waldo.

== Geography ==
Located in the southeastern corner of the county, it borders the following townships:

- Richland Township - northeast
- Westfield Township, Morrow County - east
- Marlboro Township, Delaware County - south
- Radnor Township, Delaware County - southwest corner
- Prospect Township - west
- Pleasant Township - northwest

The village of Waldo is located in western Waldo Township.

== Name and history ==
It is the only Waldo Township statewide.

== Government ==
The township is governed by a three-member board of trustees, who are elected in November of odd-numbered years to a four-year term beginning on the following January 1. Two are elected in the year after the presidential election and one is elected in the year before it. There is also an elected township fiscal officer, who serves a four-year term beginning on April 1 of the year after the election, which is held in November of the year before the presidential election. Vacancies in the fiscal officership or on the board of trustees are filled by the remaining trustees.
