= Caledonia Bowstring Bridge =

- U.S. National Register of Historic Places
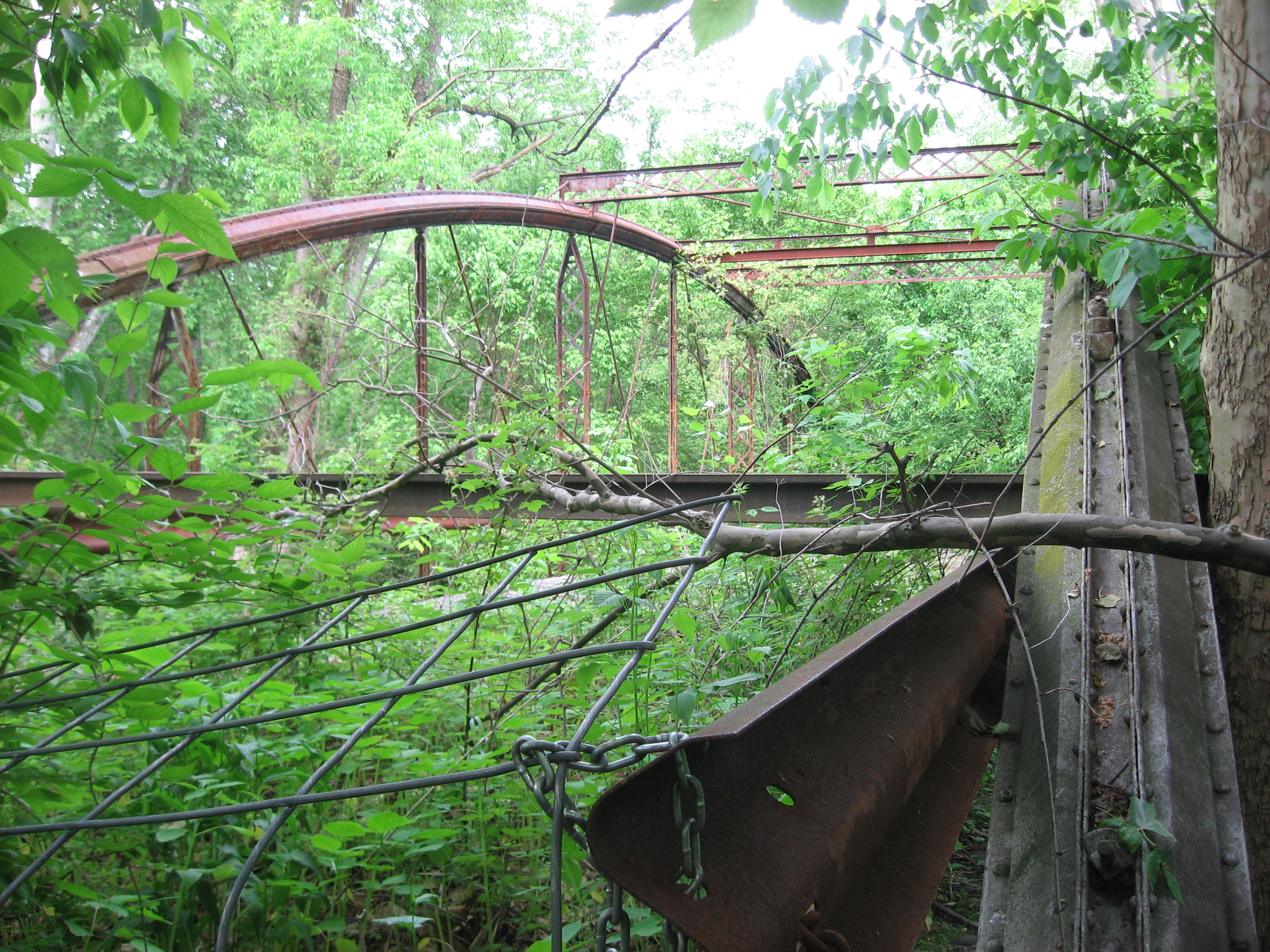
- Western end of the bridge

- Location within Ohio Location within the United States
- Nearest city: Caledonia, Ohio
- Coordinates: 40°38′33″N 82°57′56″W
- Area: Less than 1 acre (0.40 ha)
- Built: 1873
- Architect: Wrought Iron Bridge Company
- Architectural style: Bowstring arch-truss
- NRHP reference No.: 78002131
- Added to NRHP: May 23, 1978

The Caledonia Bowstring Bridge is a historic bridge in the village of Caledonia, Ohio, United States. Built in the 1870s but no longer in use, it has been named a historic site.

In 1873, local officials arranged with the Wrought Iron Bridge Company of Canton, Ohio, for the construction of a bowstring arch bridge over the Scioto River. The completed bridge features lattice bracing over the deck, which enabled the design to have both vertical and horizontal support at a low cost. Its structure combines elements of iron and steel.

In 1976, the Marion County Engineer decided to remove the bridge from its original location in order to build a new bridge at its original location. Instead of destroying it, the engineer's office moved it to Caledonia, where village officials arranged for its placement across the Olentangy River in order to provide access to a community park. Four years later, the bridge was listed on the National Register of Historic Places, qualifying both because of its place in Ohio's history and as an example of historically important methods of construction. Despite village officials' plans, by 2011 the bridge was abandoned and overgrown.
