= Richland Township, Marion County, Ohio =

Township in Ohio, US

- Township
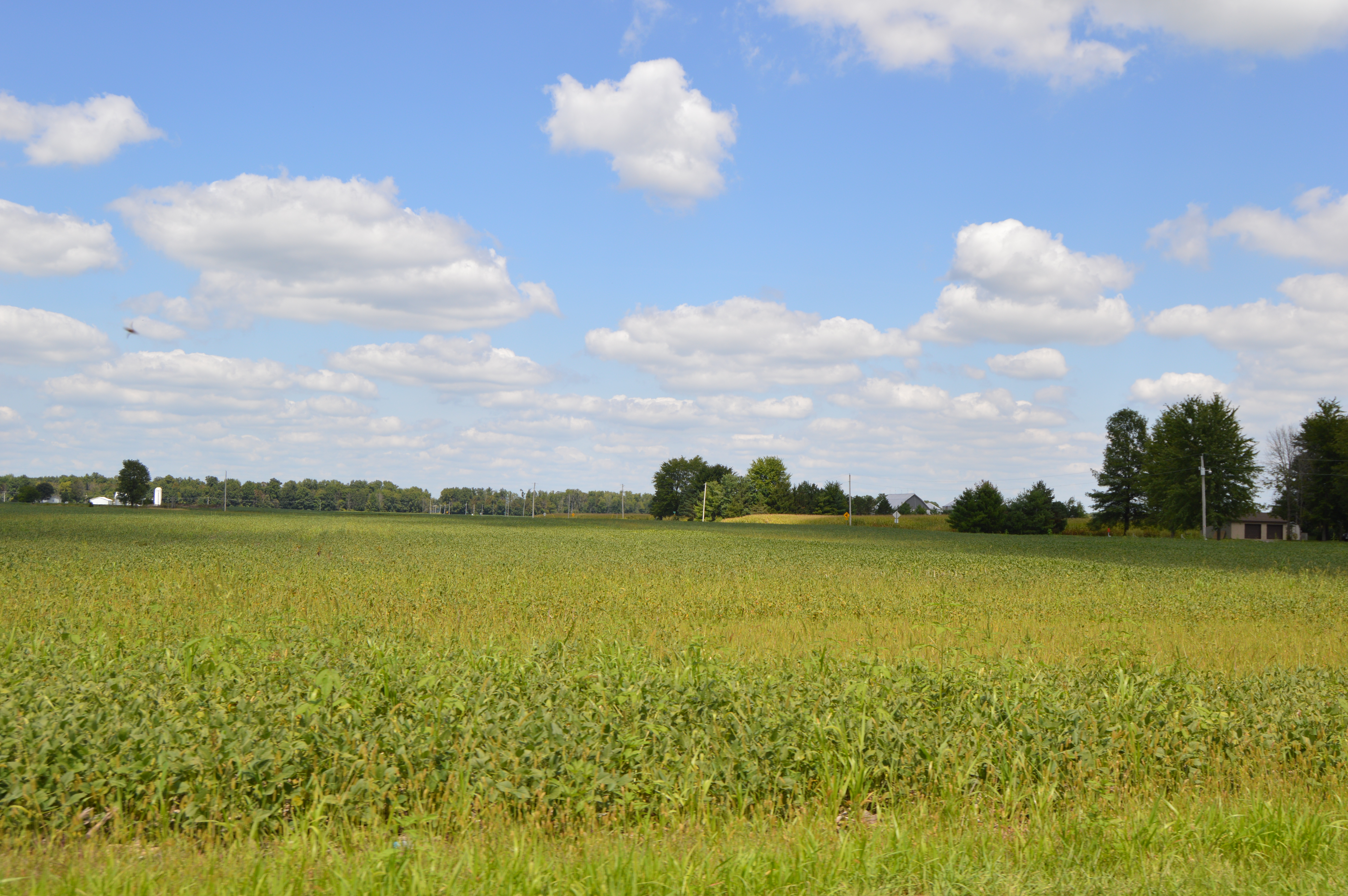
- Fields on the township's southern border

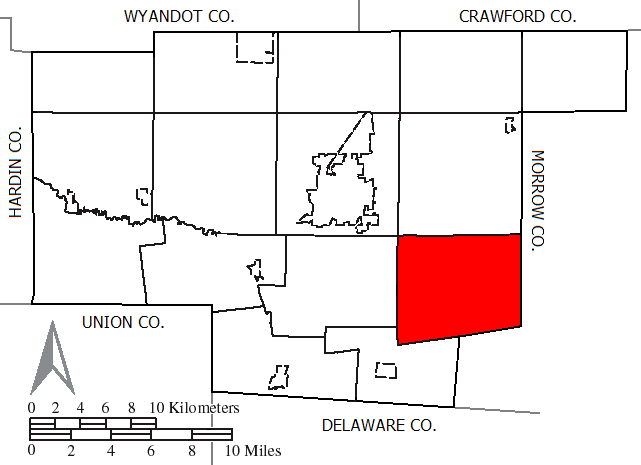
- Location of Richland Township in Marion County
- Coordinates: 40°31′32″N 83°1′11″W
- Country: United States
- State: Ohio
- County: Marion

Area
  - Total: 30.7 sq mi (79.5 km^{2})
  - Land: 30.7 sq mi (79.4 km^{2})
  - Water: 0 sq mi (0.0 km^{2})
- Elevation: 974 ft (297 m)

Population (2020)
  - Total: 1,784
  - Density: 58.2/sq mi (22.5/km^{2})
- Time zone: UTC-5 (Eastern (EST))
  - Summer (DST): UTC-4 (EDT)
- FIPS code: 39-66754
- GNIS feature ID: 1086584
- Website: https://richland-twp.com/

Richland Township is one of the fifteen townships of Marion County, Ohio, United States. The 2020 census found 1,784 people in the township.

== Geography ==
Located in the southeastern part of the county, it borders the following townships:

- Claridon Township - north
- Canaan Township, Morrow County - northeast corner
- Cardington Township, Morrow County - east
- Westfield Township, Morrow County - southeast
- Waldo Township - southwest
- Pleasant Township - west
- Marion Township - northwest corner

No municipalities are located in Richland Township.

== Name and history ==
It is one of twelve Richland Townships statewide.

== Government ==
The township is governed by a three-member board of trustees, who are elected in November of odd-numbered years to a four-year term beginning on the following January 1. Two are elected in the year after the presidential election and one is elected in the year before it. There is also an elected township fiscal officer, who serves a four-year term beginning on April 1 of the year after the election, which is held in November of the year before the presidential election. Vacancies in the fiscal officership or on the board of trustees are filled by the remaining trustees.
