= Prospect, Ohio =

- Village
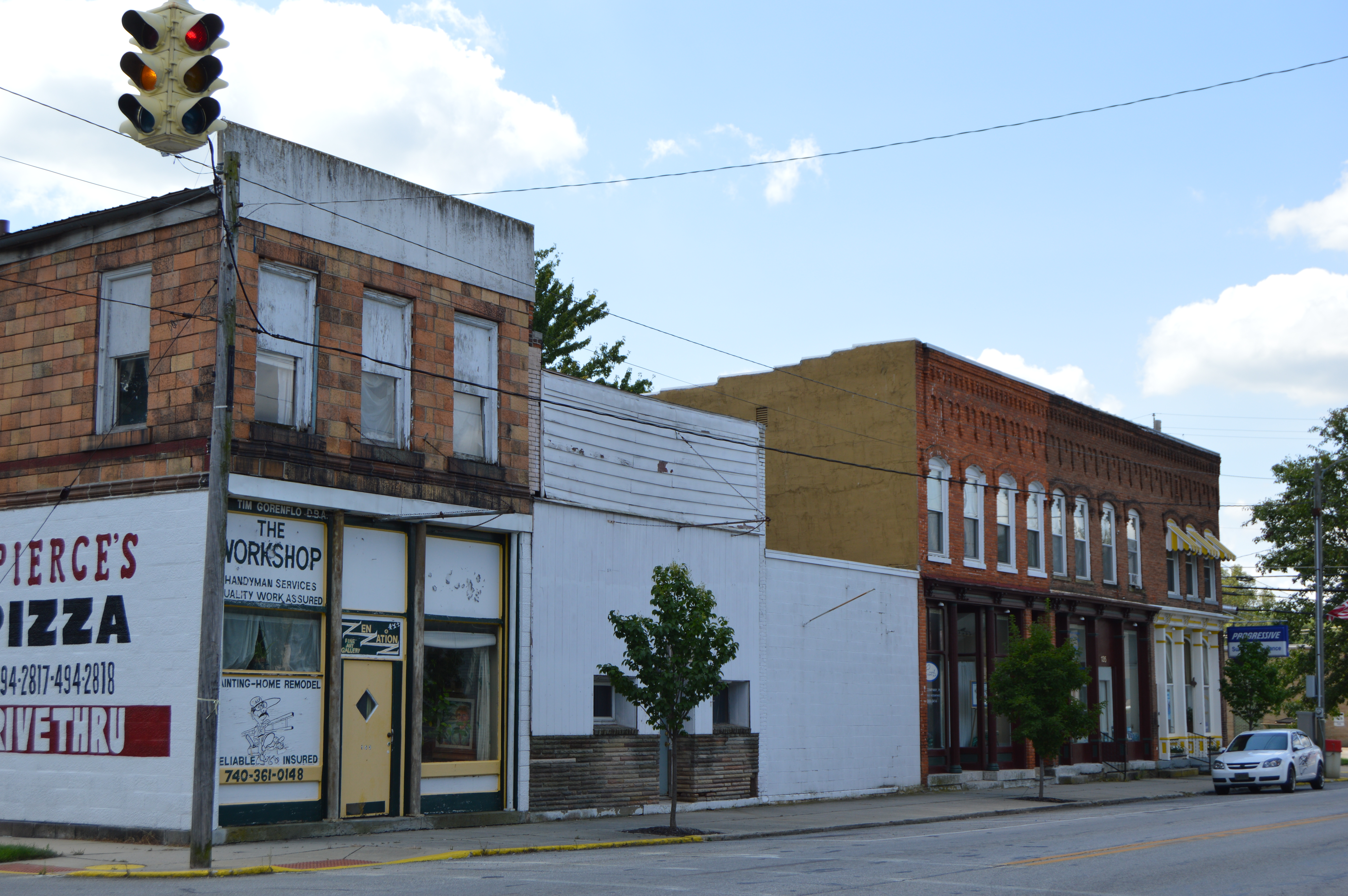
- Water Street downtown

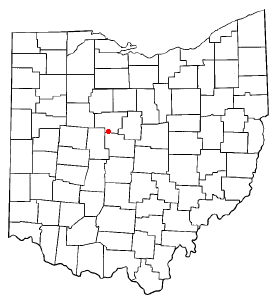
- Location of Prospect, Ohio

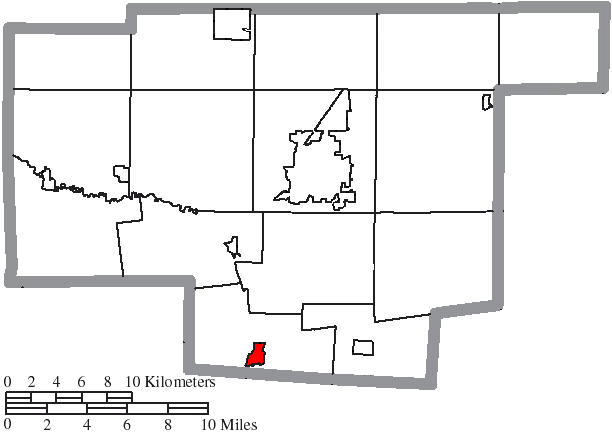
- Location of Prospect in Marion County
- Coordinates: 40°27′14″N 83°11′05″W
- Country: United States
- State: Ohio
- County: Marion
- Township: Prospect

Area
  - Total: 0.72 sq mi (1.87 km^{2})
  - Land: 0.72 sq mi (1.87 km^{2})
  - Water: 0 sq mi (0.00 km^{2})
- Elevation: 906 ft (276 m)

Population (2020)
  - Total: 1,067
  - Density: 1,474.5/sq mi (569.31/km^{2})
- Time zone: UTC-5 (Eastern (EST))
  - Summer (DST): UTC-4 (EDT)
- ZIP code: 43342
- Area code: 740
- FIPS code: 39-64780
- GNIS feature ID: 2399027

Prospect is a village in Marion County, Ohio, United States. The population was 1,067 at the 2020 census. The village is served by Elgin Local School District.

== Geography ==
According to the United States Census Bureau, the village has a total area of 0.72 square miles (1.86 km^{2}), all land.

== Demographics ==
Historical population
Census	Pop.	Note	%±
1880	600		—
1890	830		38.3%
1900	983		18.4%
1910	945		−3.9%
1920	949		0.4%
1930	1,013		6.7%
1940	915		−9.7%
1950	1,031		12.7%
1960	1,067		3.5%
1970	1,031		−3.4%
1980	1,159		12.4%
1990	1,148		−0.9%
2000	1,191		3.7%
2010	1,112		−6.6%
2020	1,067		−4.0%
U.S. Decennial Census

=== 2010 census ===
As of the census of 2010, there were 1,112 people, 453 households, and 304 families living in the village. The population density was 1,544.4 inhabitants per square mile (596.3/km^{2}). There were 494 housing units at an average density of 686.1 per square mile (264.9/km^{2}). The racial makeup of the village was 98.1% White, 0.3% African American, 0.2% Asian, 0.4% from other races, and 1.1% from two or more races. Hispanic or Latino of any race were 1.3% of the population.

There were 453 households, of which 33.6% had children under the age of 18 living with them, 50.6% were married couples living together, 9.9% had a female householder with no husband present, 6.6% had a male householder with no wife present, and 32.9% were non-families. 26.9% of all households were made up of individuals, and 9.3% had someone living alone who was 65 years of age or older. The average household size was 2.45 and the average family size was 2.97.

The median age in the village was 37.5 years. 25.5% of residents were under the age of 18; 7.9% were between the ages of 18 and 24; 26.8% were from 25 to 44; 27.8% were from 45 to 64; and 12.1% were 65 years of age or older. The gender makeup of the village was 50.0% male and 50.0% female.

=== 2000 census ===
As of the census of 2000, there were 1,191 people, 469 households, and 343 families living in the village. The population density was 1,642.9 inhabitants per square mile (634.3/km^{2}). There were 490 housing units at an average density of 675.9 per square mile (261.0/km^{2}). The racial makeup of the village was 99.41% White, 0.08% Native American, 0.08% from other races, and 0.42% from two or more races.

There were 469 households, out of which 36.0% had children under the age of 18 living with them, 59.9% were married couples living together, 8.5% had a female householder with no husband present, and 26.7% were non-families. 21.5% of all households were made up of individuals, and 9.4% had someone living alone who was 65 years of age or older. The average household size was 2.54 and the average family size was 2.97.

In the village, the population was spread out, with 25.6% under the age of 18, 8.9% from 18 to 24, 30.5% from 25 to 44, 22.6% from 45 to 64, and 12.4% who were 65 years of age or older. The median age was 36 years. For every 100 females there were 97.8 males. For every 100 females age 18 and over, there were 96.9 males.

The median income for a household in the village was $46,316, and the median income for a family was $54,063. Males had a median income of $35,429 versus $23,636 for females. The per capita income for the village was $20,324. About 2.1% of families and 2.6% of the population were below the poverty line, including 1.3% of those under age 18 and 7.9% of those age 65 or over.
