= Claridon Township, Marion County, Ohio =

Township in Ohio, US

- Township
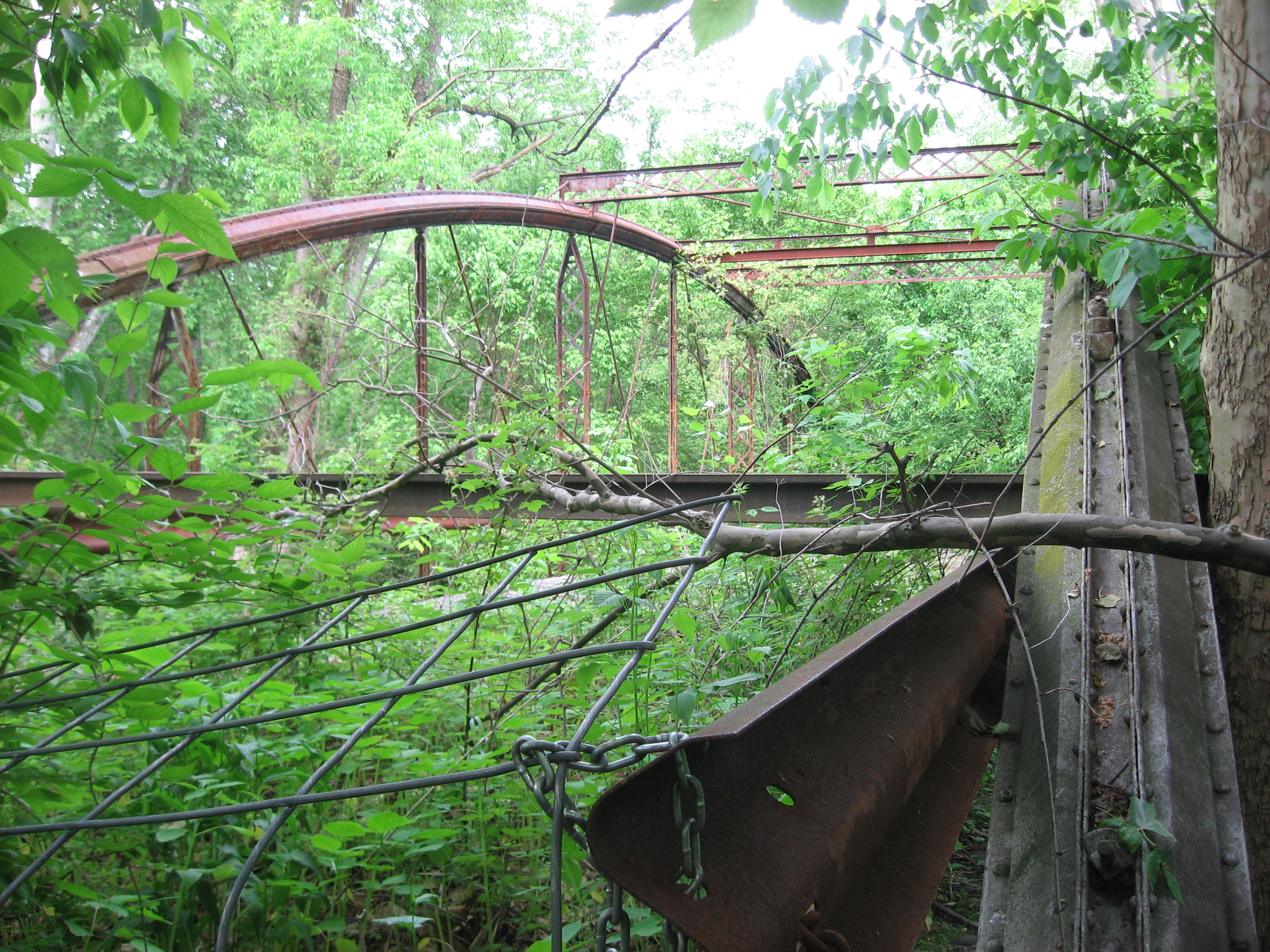
- Abandoned Caledonia Bowstring Bridge over the Olentangy River

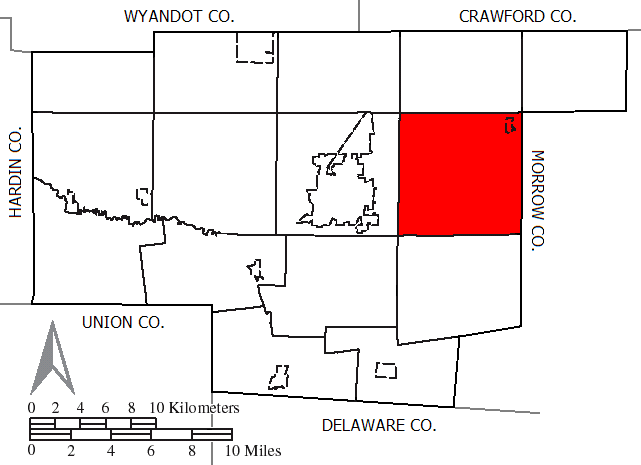
- Location of Claridon Township in Marion County
- Coordinates: 40°36′31″N 82°59′54″W
- Country: United States
- State: Ohio
- County: Marion

Area
  - Total: 36.8 sq mi (95.4 km^{2})
  - Land: 36.8 sq mi (95.4 km^{2})
  - Water: 0 sq mi (0.0 km^{2})
- Elevation: 997 ft (304 m)

Population (2020)
  - Total: 2,777
  - Density: 75.4/sq mi (29.1/km^{2})
- Time zone: UTC-5 (Eastern (EST))
  - Summer (DST): UTC-4 (EDT)
- FIPS code: 39-15196
- GNIS feature ID: 1086576
- Website: https://www.claridontwp.com/

Claridon Township is one of the fifteen townships of Marion County, Ohio, United States. The 2020 census found 2,777 people in the township, 560 of whom lived in the village of Caledonia.

== Geography ==
Located in the eastern part of the county, it borders the following townships:

- Scott Township - north
- Tully Township - northeast corner
- Canaan Township, Morrow County - east
- Cardington Township, Morrow County - southeast corner
- Richland Township - south
- Pleasant Township - southwest corner
- Marion Township - west
- Grand Prairie Township - northwest corner

The village of Caledonia is located in northeastern Claridon Township.

== Name and history ==
Statewide, the only other Claridon Township is located in Geauga County. During the early formation of Marion County, the community of Claridon was considered as a possible location for the Marion County's county seat, however it lost out to the more centrally located village of Marion, Ohio.

== Government ==
The township is governed by a three-member board of trustees, who are elected in November of odd-numbered years to a four-year term beginning on the following January 1. Two are elected in the year after the presidential election and one is elected in the year before it. There is also an elected township fiscal officer, who serves a four-year term beginning on April 1 of the year after the election, which is held in November of the year before the presidential election. Vacancies in the fiscal officership or on the board of trustees are filled by the remaining trustees.
