= Marion Township, Marion County, Ohio =

Township in Ohio, US

- Township
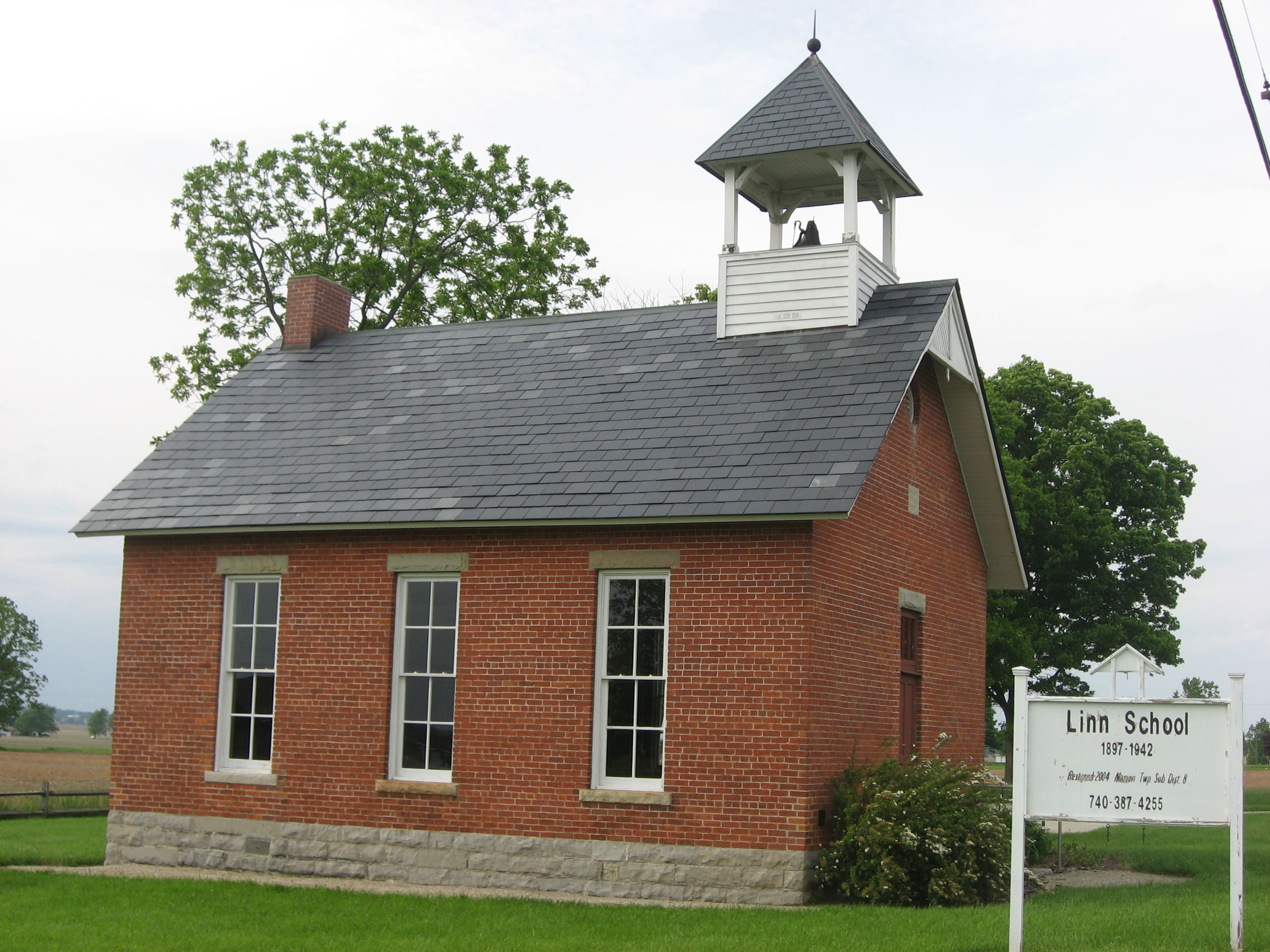
- Former Marion Township Sub-District No. 8 School on State Route 4

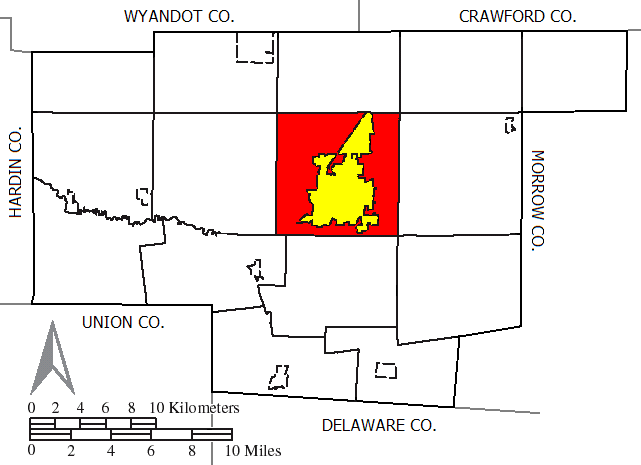
- Location of Marion Township (red) in Marion County, surrounding the city of Marion (yellow)
- Coordinates: 40°35′23″N 83°7′30″W
- Country: United States
- State: Ohio
- County: Marion

Area
  - Total: 36.8 sq mi (95.4 km^{2})
  - Land: 36.7 sq mi (95.0 km^{2})
  - Water: 0.15 sq mi (0.4 km^{2})
- Elevation: 988 ft (301 m)

Population (2020)
  - Total: 43,796
  - Density: 1,190/sq mi (461/km^{2})
- Time zone: UTC-5 (Eastern (EST))
  - Summer (DST): UTC-4 (EDT)
- Area code: 740
- FIPS code: 39-47768
- GNIS feature ID: 1086580
- Website: https://mariontwp.org/

Marion Township is one of the fifteen townships of Marion County, Ohio, United States. The 2020 census found 43,796 people in the township, 35,999 of whom lived in the city of Marion.

== Geography ==
Located in the center of the county, it borders the following townships:

- Grand Prairie Township - north
- Scott Township - northeast corner
- Claridon Township - east
- Richland Township - southeast corner
- Pleasant Township - south
- Green Camp Township - southwest
- Big Island Township - west
- Salt Rock Township - northwest corner

Most of the city of Marion, the county seat of Marion County, is located in central Marion Township.

== Name and history ==
It is one of twelve Marion Townships statewide. The Township was originally established as Center Township, a name that was replaced on December 5, 1827, when the township became Marion Township.

== Government ==
The township is governed by a three-member board of trustees, who are elected in November of odd-numbered years to a four-year term beginning on the following January 1. Two are elected in the year after the presidential election and one is elected in the year before it. There is also an elected township fiscal officer, who serves a four-year term beginning on April 1 of the year after the election, which is held in November of the year before the presidential election. Vacancies in the fiscal officership or on the board of trustees are filled by the remaining trustees.
