= Caledonia, Ohio =

- Village
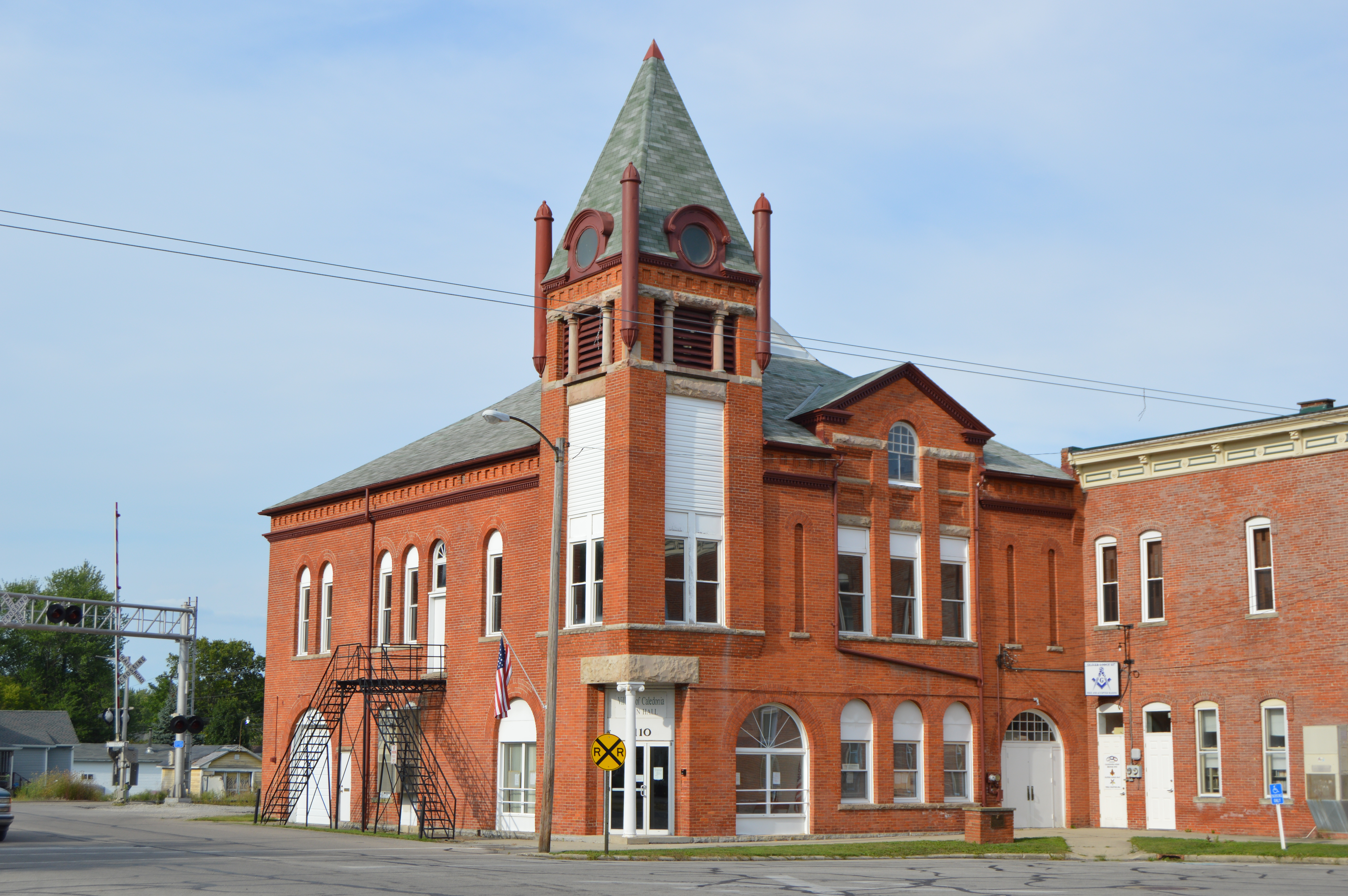
- Village Hall on the Public Square

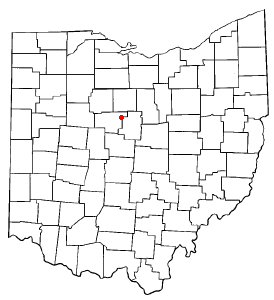
- Location of Caledonia, Ohio

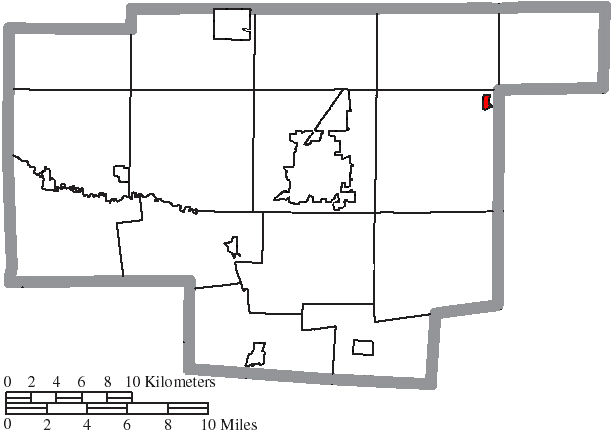
- Location of Caledonia in Marion County
- Coordinates: 40°38′11″N 82°58′10″W
- Country: United States
- State: Ohio
- County: Marion
- Township: Claridon

Area
  - Total: 0.24 sq mi (0.63 km^{2})
  - Land: 0.24 sq mi (0.63 km^{2})
  - Water: 0 sq mi (0.00 km^{2})
- Elevation: 997 ft (304 m)

Population (2020)
  - Total: 560
  - Estimate (2023): 550
  - Density: 2,417/sq mi (933.3/km^{2})
- Time zone: UTC-5 (Eastern (EST))
  - Summer (DST): UTC-4 (EDT)
- ZIP code: 43314
- Area code: 419
- FIPS code: 39-10954
- GNIS feature ID: 2397526
- Website: https://www.caledoniaoh.gov/

Caledonia is a village in Marion County, Ohio, United States. The population was 560 at the 2020 census.

== History ==
The village was named after Caledonia, an ancient name for Scotland, the ancestral home of a large share of the first settlers.

The northern side of Caledonia is the location of the Caledonia Bowstring Bridge, which is listed on the National Register of Historic Places.

== Geography ==
According to the United States Census Bureau, the village has a total area of 0.23 square miles (0.60 km^{2}), all land.

Caledonia is one of the few post-glaciation prairie areas in Ohio and a historically significant maintained grassland area situated along the Whetstone River in the Sandusky Plains.

== Demographics ==
Historical population
| Census | Pop. | Note | %± |
|---|---|---|---|
| 1870 | 419 | | — |
| 1880 | 627 | | 49.6% |
| 1890 | 757 | | 20.7% |
| 1900 | 682 | | −9.9% |
| 1910 | 562 | | −17.6% |
| 1920 | 492 | | −12.5% |
| 1930 | 526 | | 6.9% |
| 1940 | 629 | | 19.6% |
| 1950 | 655 | | 4.1% |
| 1960 | 673 | | 2.7% |
| 1970 | 792 | | 17.7% |
| 1980 | 759 | | −4.2% |
| 1990 | 644 | | −15.2% |
| 2000 | 578 | | −10.2% |
| 2010 | 577 | | −0.2% |
| 2020 | 560 | | −2.9% |
| 2023 (est.) | 550 | ▼ | −1.8% |
U.S. Decennial Census

=== 2020 census ===
As of the census of 2020, there were 560 people, 246 housing units, 230 households, and 154 families living in the village. The population density was 2,434.8 inhabitants per square mile (940.1/km^{2}). There were 246 housing units at an average density of 1,069.6 units per square mile (413.0 units/km^{2}). The racial makeup of the village was 93.6% White, 0.3% African American, 0.0% Asian, 0.5% from other races, 5.0% from two or more races, and 0.5% American Indian/Alaskan Native. Hispanic or Latino of any race were 1.25% of the population.

There were 230 households, with the average household size being 3.34. 58.0% were married couples living together.

The median age in the village was 32.2 years. 25.9% of residents were under the age of 18; 7.4% were between the ages of 18 and 24; 32.2% were from 25 to 44; 19.9% were from 45 to 64; and 14.8% were 65 years of age or older. The gender makeup of the village was 50.5% male and 49.5% female.

The median income for a household in the village was $64,286, and the median income for a family was $75,625. About 11.7% of the population were living below the poverty line.

=== 2010 census ===
As of the census of 2010, there were 577 people, 232 households, and 174 families living in the village. The population density was 2,508.7 inhabitants per square mile (968.6/km^{2}). There were 260 housing units at an average density of 1,130.4 units per square mile (436.4 units/km^{2}). The racial makeup of the village was 97.4% White, 1.6% African American, 0.2% Asian, 0.7% from other races, and 0.2% from two or more races. Hispanic or Latino of any race were 0.5% of the population.

There were 232 households, of which 31.5% had children under the age of 18 living with them, 57.3% were married couples living together, 12.1% had a female householder with no husband present, 5.6% had a male householder with no wife present, and 25.0% were non-families. 21.1% of all households were made up of individuals, and 10.3% had someone living alone who was 65 years of age or older. The average household size was 2.49 and the average family size was 2.86.

The median age in the village was 40.2 years. 24.1% of residents were under the age of 18; 6.6% were between the ages of 18 and 24; 26% were from 25 to 44; 27.2% were from 45 to 64; and 16.3% were 65 years of age or older. The gender makeup of the village was 47.5% male and 52.5% female.

=== 2000 census ===
As of the census of 2000, there were 578 people, 230 households, and 169 families living in the village. The population density was 2,568.0 inhabitants per square mile (991.5/km^{2}). There were 242 housing units at an average density of 1,075.2 units per square mile (415.1 units/km^{2}). The racial makeup of the village was 99.31% White, 0.35% African American, and 0.35% from two or more races. Hispanic or Latino of any race were 0.35% of the population.

There were 230 households, out of which 32.6% had children under the age of 18 living with them, 60.0% were married couples living together, 8.7% had a female householder with no husband present, and 26.5% were non-families. 23.9% of all households were made up of individuals, and 12.2% had someone living alone who was 65 years of age or older. The average household size was 2.51 and the average family size was 2.92.

In the village, the population was spread out, with 25.3% under the age of 18, 7.1% from 18 to 24, 30.3% from 25 to 44, 25.4% from 45 to 64, and 11.9% who were 65 years of age or older. The median age was 37 years. For every 100 females, there were 95.9 males. For every 100 females age 18 and over, there were 97.3 males.

The median income for a household in the village was $40,804, and the median income for a family was $46,563. Males had a median income of $34,375 versus $22,344 for females. The per capita income for the village was $17,423. About 1.9% of families and 4.9% of the population were below the poverty line, including none of those under age 18 and 5.3% of those age 65 or over.

== Education ==
River Valley Local School District operates two elementary schools, one middle school, and River Valley High School.

From the 1920s until 2021, Caledonia had a public library: a branch of Marion Public Library. This branch closed in the middle of the COVID-19 pandemic & does not have plans to reopen. The library space is currently vacant.

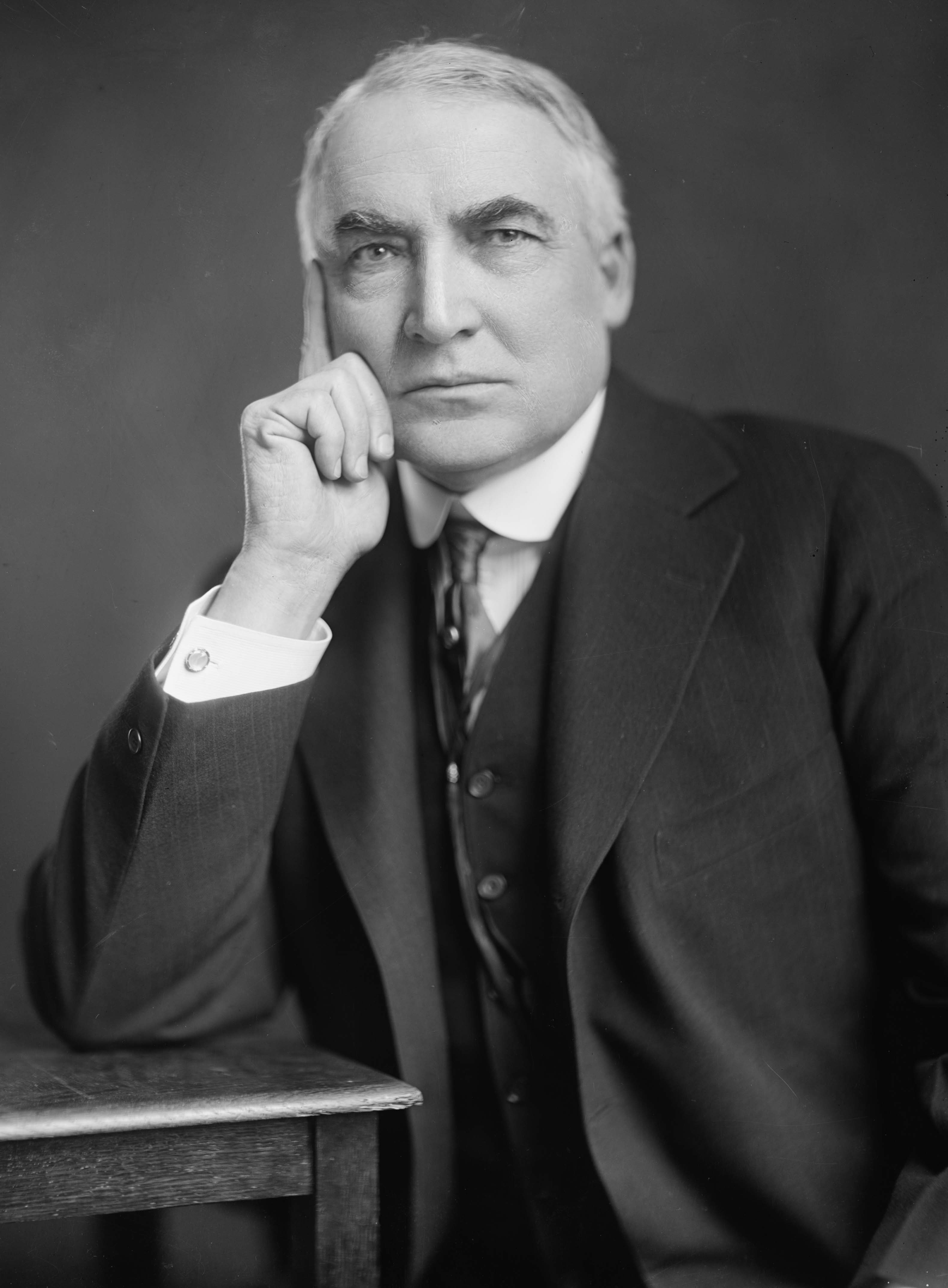
Warren G. Harding, 29th President of the United States and former resident of Caledonia, Ohio.

== Notable people ==
- Sherwood Anderson spent several years of his childhood in Caledonia, where his father worked as a harness-maker. Anderson based elements of his 1926 semi-autobiographical novel Tar: A Midwest Childhood on his time in Caledonia.
- Daniel Richard Crissinger was educated in Caledonia and served as chairman of the Federal Reserve Board between 1923 and 1927.
- Warren G. Harding was a resident of Caledonia during his childhood and worked for a brief period of time at the community newspaper, The Argus.
