= DeCliff, Ohio =

- Unincorporated community
- Location within Ohio Location within the United States
- Coordinates: 40°36′27″N 83°20′32″W
- Country: United States
- State: Ohio
- County: Marion
- Township: Montgomery
- Elevation: 945 ft (288 m)
- Time zone: UTC-5 (Eastern (EST))
  - Summer (DST): UTC-4 (EDT)
- ZIP Codes: 43332 (La Rue); 43341 (New Bloomington)
- Area code: 740
- GNIS feature ID: 1064515

DeCliff is an unincorporated community in Montgomery Township, Marion County, Ohio, United States. It is located northwest of New Bloomington at the intersection of DeCliff Road North and DeCliff-Big Island Road.
