= Espyville, Ohio =

- Unincorporated community
- Location within Ohio Location within the United States
- Coordinates: 40°35′49″N 83°15′19″W
- Country: United States
- State: Ohio
- Counties: Marion
- Township: Big Island
- Elevation: 942 ft (287 m)
- Time zone: UTC-5 (Eastern (EST))
  - Summer (DST): UTC-4 (EDT)
- ZIP Code: 43302 (Marion)
- Area code: 740
- GNIS feature ID: 1064627

Espyville is an unincorporated community in Big Island Township, Marion County, Ohio, United States. It is located between New Bloomington and Marion on Espyville Road north of its intersection with Ohio State Route 95.

The Espyville Post Office was established on June 10, 1884, and discontinued on May 31, 1910. Mail service is now handled through the Marion branch.
