= Claridon, Ohio =

Claridon, Ohio may refer to the following places in Ohio:

- Claridon, Geauga County, Ohio
- Claridon Township, Geauga County, Ohio
- Claridon, Marion County, Ohio
- Claridon Township, Marion County, Ohio
