= Hepburn =

Hepburn may refer to:

== Surname ==
People with the surname Hepburn (the most famous in recent times being actresses Katharine Hepburn and Audrey Hepburn):

- Hepburn (surname)

== Linguistics ==
- Hepburn romanization, a system for the romanization of Japanese

== Places ==
=== Australia ===
- Shire of Hepburn, a local government area in Victoria
- Hepburn Springs, Victoria, a resort town in Victoria

=== Canada ===
- Hepburn, Saskatchewan, a small farming and college community

=== United Kingdom ===
- Hepburn, Northumberland

=== United States ===
- Hepburn, Indiana, an unincorporated community
- Hepburn, Iowa, a city in Page County
- Hepburn, Ohio, an unincorporated community in Hardin County
- Hepburn Township, Pennsylvania, in Lycoming County

== Other uses ==
- Hepburn (band), a British pop rock band

== See also ==
- Hepburn Act of 1906, giving the US Interstate Commerce Commission the power to set railroad rates
- Hepburn Avenue, a road in Perth, Western Australia
- Hepburn Block, an office building in Toronto, Ontario
