= John Purdue =

American businessman and philanthropist (1802–1876)

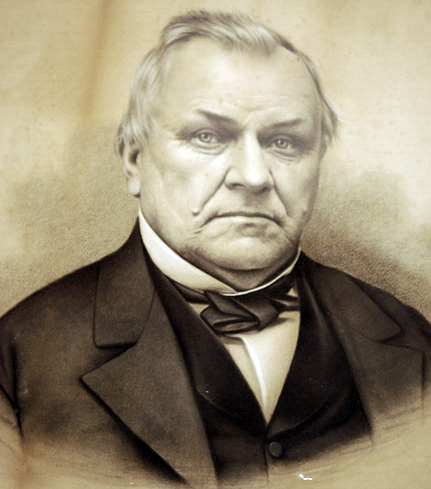
- Purdue c. 1870
- Born: October 31, 1802; Huntingdon County, Pennsylvania, U.S.
- Died: September 12, 1876 (aged 73); Lafayette, Indiana, U.S.
- Resting place: Memorial Mall, Purdue University
- Occupation: Industrialist
- Known for: Main benefactor of Purdue University

John Purdue (/pɜːrˈduː/; October 31, 1802 – September 12, 1876) was a wealthy American industrialist in Lafayette, Indiana, and the primary original benefactor of Purdue University.

== Early life ==
Most details of Purdue's early life were either not recorded or lost.

He was born in Huntingdon County, Pennsylvania, to Charles and Mary Short Purdue. He had eight sisters and no brothers. Sometime after 1813 (possibly as late as 1823), the family moved to Ross County, Ohio. During the move, the second oldest daughter, Nancy, died, and shortly after the move, his father died. Shortly thereafter John was apprenticed to an Adelphi merchant, and his mother and at least a few of his sisters moved north and settled near Westerville, Ohio.

== Teacher ==
From 1823 to 1831, he was a school teacher around Ohio and in Michigan.

== Businessman ==
As stated in the 1979 Marion County History Book, on March 13, 1831, he bought a 160-acre (0.65 km^{2}) farm in Salt Rock Township in Marion County, Ohio. He sold the same on August 20, 1832, at a profit. He derived additional gain from collecting a commission in taking his neighbor's hogs to market.

Purdue developed a farm products brokerage that covered the Adelphi, Worthington and Columbus area. In 1833, he and Moses Fowler opened a general merchandise store in Adelphi. On December 9, 1834, Purdue purchased 240 acres (0.97 km^{2}) of land in Indiana from Jesse Spencer for $850 which he partially paid for in store goods. The land that he bought lies northeast of the intersection of Creasy Lane and McCarty Lane in Lafayette, Indiana.

In 1838 or 1839, Purdue and Fowler liquidated their Ohio holdings and permanently moved to Lafayette. Once there, they opened a dry goods business on the courthouse square. Purdue continued to gain wealth and prestige over the next several years. Most accounts show a man devoted to leading a good civic life, donating time, money, and expertise to various local projects including a bridge over the Wabash River, a railroad from Lafayette to Indianapolis and serving on various boards.

In 1844, Fowler and Purdue ended their association. In 1847, a group of five merchants, including Purdue, completed a 600-foot (180 m) wooden toll bridge across the Wabash.

On October 20, 1852, Purdue and four others were appointed as the first trustees of the new Lafayette City Public School. While various tax-related lawsuits crippled the new statewide public school budget, Purdue and others privately helped keep Lafayette's afloat.

By 1855, Purdue was spending a fair amount of time in New York doing business. In 1856, he became involved in what would come to be Purdue, Ward and Company.

In 1857, he bought stock in and served as a trustee of the Battle Ground Collegiate Institute (college preparatory classes). He also donated $500 in cash to help another collegiate institute in the newly platted Stockwell, Indiana.

Purdue profited greatly during the American Civil War mainly because of the increase in demand for dry goods by the Union Army. Purdue supported the Union in the war, but some night-time raids by Confederate sympathizers on local businesses were reported. To protect his assets, Purdue established the "Purdue Rifles," a volunteer protective force of about 100 trained, uniformed and armed men who guarded Confederate prisoners, rounded up deserters, and maintained order.

Throughout the 1860s, Purdue acquired large tracts of land in nearby Warren County. By 1872, he owned about 2,020 acres (8.2 km^{2}) which came to be known as the Walnut Grove Farm.

In 1867, Purdue invested money in and presided as president of the Lafayette Agricultural Works, a Lafayette implement factory, until the mid-1870s.

In 1868, he contributed money to and was the president for seven years of the new Springvale Cemetery in Lafayette.

In 1869, he helped found the Lafayette Savings Bank.

He later supported some questionable business ventures, including backing the Lafayette, Muncie and Bloomington Railroad, even as lawsuits and debts climbed. Purdue also backed a silver mining scheme in Colorado, the Purdue Gold and Silver Mining and Ore Reduction Company, which failed to pay any dividends.

== Politician ==
In 1864, Purdue lost a contentious primary battle to incumbent Godlove Stein Orth for the nomination of the Union Party's candidate for Congress.

In 1866, Purdue again challenged Orth but this time in the general election as an Independent. Despite buying the Lafayette Journal to counteract the Lafayette Courier (which supported Orth), Purdue was again defeated 14,933 to 14,728.

== Purdue University ==
In 1862, the Morrill Land Grant Act was passed by Congress, and the competition was on to find a location for a land grant college in Indiana. Bidding was fierce between Indiana University in Bloomington, Northwestern Christian in Indianapolis, and the Stockwell and Battle Ground Collegiate Institutes. After the death of influential Lafayette Senator Albert S. White, the Stockwell bid fell through. Years of wrangling failed to reach a compromise. In 1865, the state started the State Normal College (later Indiana State University), partly to relieve some of the pressure. To make Tippecanoe County stand out, various locals stepped up with offers of land and money.

By 1869, Tippecanoe's bid was up to nearly $400,000 in cash, land, and bonds, but the legislature still stalled. Then, Purdue stepped forth with $100,000 of his personal wealth. His only conditions were for the college to be located in Battle Ground and for his surname to be associated with it. After some more negotiations, when the name of the university was chosen and he was added to the board of trustees, Purdue's donations were raised to $150,000 (equivalent to $2.9 million in 2019) and 100 acres (0.40 km^{2}) of land. The negotiations also allowed the new board of trustees to choose the site of the university and on May 6, 1869, the General Assembly established the institution in Tippecanoe County as Purdue University. Classes began at Purdue on September 16, 1874, with six instructors and 39 students.

== Death ==
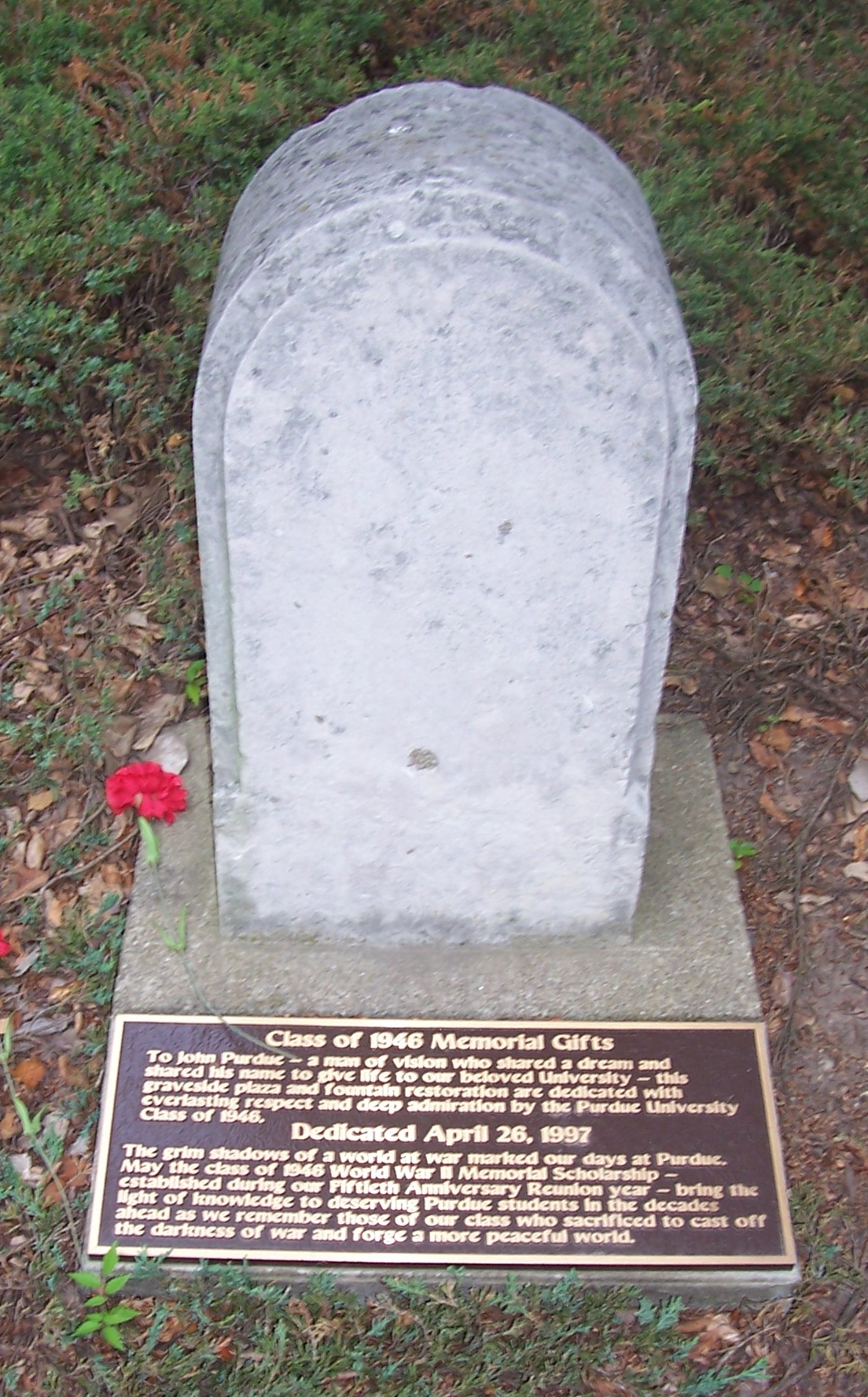
Purdue's gravestone on the Purdue University campus.

He died of an apparent stroke on September 12, 1876, aged 73, on the first day of classes of the third academic year at the university he had helped found. Purdue's grave is located on the university's main campus. A bachelor, he had no heirs; his estate was tied up in litigation for years after his death.
