= Bowling Green Township, Ohio =

Bowling Green Township, Ohio, may refer to:

- Bowling Green Township, Licking County, Ohio
- Bowling Green Township, Marion County, Ohio
