= Espyville =

Espyville may refer to:

- Espyville, Ohio
- Espyville, Pennsylvania
