= Ridgeway, Ohio =

- Village
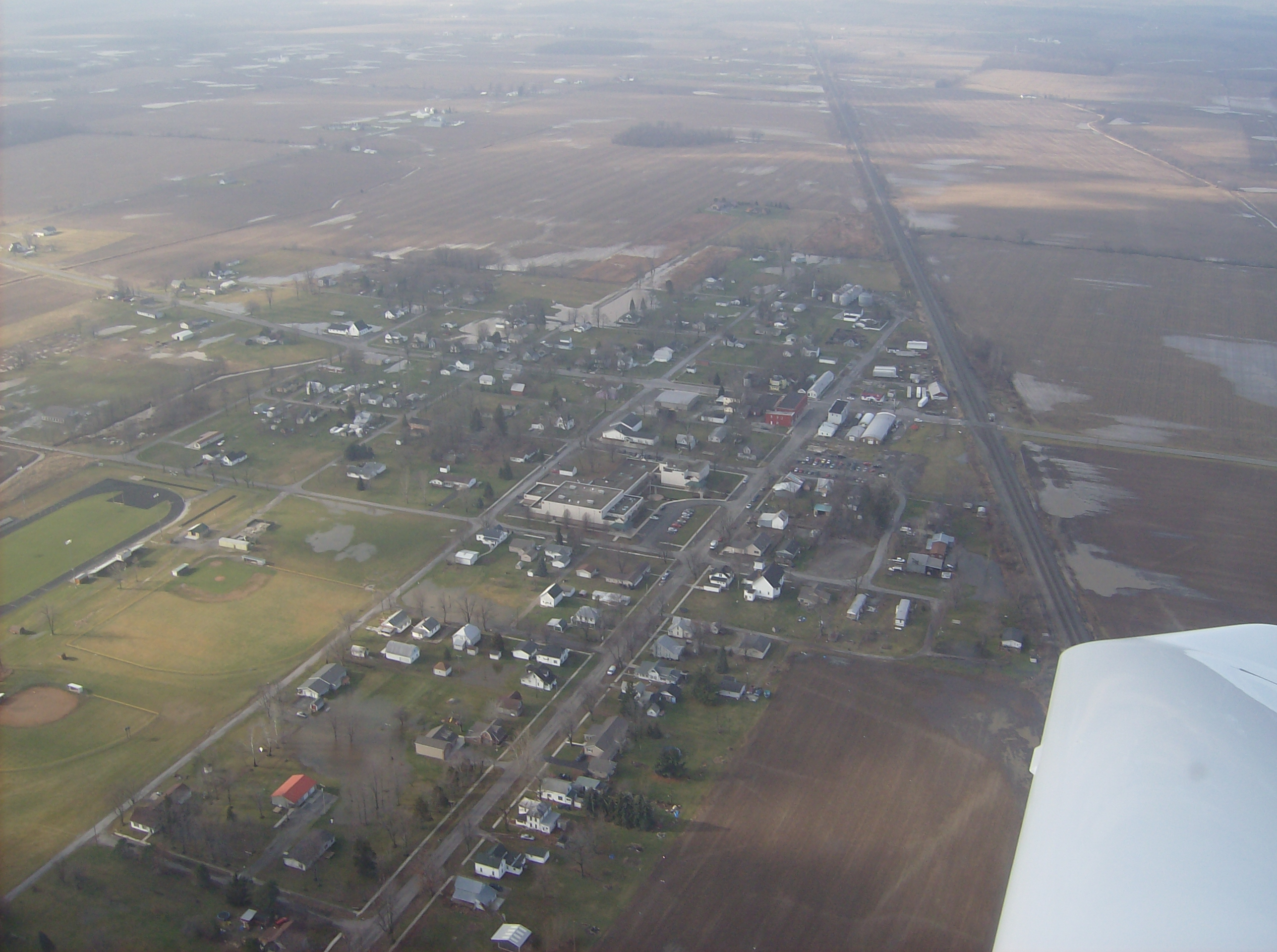
- Ridgeway from the air

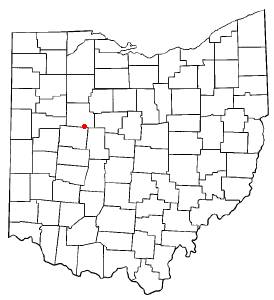
- Location of Ridgeway, Ohio

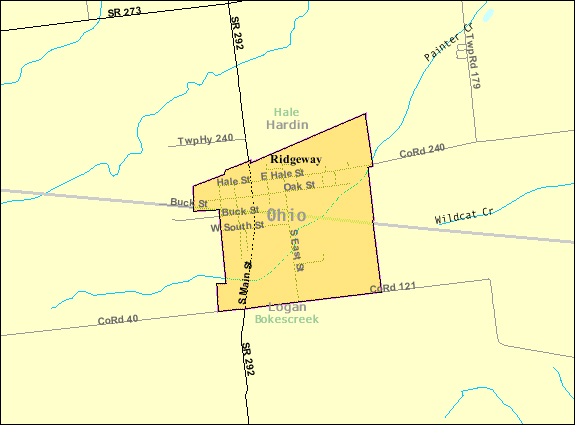
- Detailed map of Ridgeway
- Coordinates: 40°30′44″N 83°34′09″W
- Country: United States
- State: Ohio
- Counties: Hardin, Logan
- Townships: Hale, Bokescreek

Government
  - Mayor: Kevin Howland

Area
  - Total: 0.56 sq mi (1.46 km^{2})
  - Land: 0.56 sq mi (1.46 km^{2})
  - Water: 0 sq mi (0.00 km^{2})
- Elevation: 1,050 ft (320 m)

Population (2020)
  - Total: 314
  - Density: 555.1/sq mi (214.34/km^{2})
- Time zone: UTC-5 (Eastern (EST))
  - Summer (DST): UTC-4 (EDT)
- ZIP code: 43345
- Area codes: 937, 326
- FIPS code: 39-67118
- GNIS feature ID: 2399073

Ridgeway is a village in Hardin and Logan counties in the U.S. state of Ohio. The population was 314 at the 2020 census.

== History ==
Ridgeway was laid out in 1851 when the railroad was extended to the area. Ridgeway receives its name from the Ridgeway family, the original owners of the town site. The village was incorporated in 1858 as West Ridgeway. A post office called Ridgeway has been in operation since 1865.

== Geography ==
According to the United States Census Bureau, the village has a total area of 0.59 square miles (1.53 km^{2}), all land.

== Demographics ==
Historical population
Census	Pop.	Note	%±
1870	277		—
1880	342		23.5%
1890	321		−6.1%
1900	447		39.3%
1910	427		−4.5%
1920	456		6.8%
1930	375		−17.8%
1940	385		2.7%
1950	384		−0.3%
1960	448		16.7%
1970	379		−15.4%
1980	388		2.4%
1990	378		−2.6%
2000	354		−6.3%
2010	338		−4.5%
2020	314		−7.1%
U.S. Decennial Census

=== 2010 census ===
As of the census of 2010, there were 338 people, 125 households, and 93 families living in the village. The population density was 572.9 inhabitants per square mile (221.2/km^{2}). There were 133 housing units at an average density of 225.4 per square mile (87.0/km^{2}). The racial makeup of the village was 97.0% White, 1.5% African American, 0.3% Asian, and 1.2% from two or more races. Hispanic or Latino of any race were 0.9% of the population.

There were 125 households, of which 40.8% had children under the age of 18 living with them, 55.2% were married couples living together, 13.6% had a female householder with no husband present, 5.6% had a male householder with no wife present, and 25.6% were non-families. 20.0% of all households were made up of individuals, and 5.6% had someone living alone who was 65 years of age or older. The average household size was 2.70 and the average family size was 3.12.

The median age in the village was 34.4 years. 29.3% of residents were under the age of 18; 7.4% were between the ages of 18 and 24; 27.8% were from 25 to 44; 26.3% were from 45 to 64; and 9.2% were 65 years of age or older. The gender makeup of the village was 47.0% male and 53.0% female.

=== 2000 census ===
As of the census of 2000, there were 354 people, 123 households, and 101 families living in the village. The population density was 589.5 inhabitants per square mile (227.6/km^{2}). There were 136 housing units at an average density of 226.5 per square mile (87.5/km^{2}). The racial makeup of the village was 98.02% White, 1.69% African American, and 0.28% from other races.

There were 123 households, out of which 47.2% had children under the age of 18 living with them, 64.2% were married couples living together, 13.0% had a female householder with no husband present, and 17.1% were non-families. 13.8% of all households were made up of individuals, and 7.3% had someone living alone who was 65 years of age or older. The average household size was 2.88 and the average family size was 3.14.

In the village, the population was spread out, with 30.8% under the age of 18, 9.6% from 18 to 24, 32.5% from 25 to 44, 17.2% from 45 to 64, and 9.9% who were 65 years of age or older. The median age was 33 years. For every 100 females there were 94.5 males. For every 100 females age 18 and over, there were 102.5 males.

The median income for a household in the village was $43,542, and the median income for a family was $46,250. Males had a median income of $36,875 versus $21,250 for females. The per capita income for the village was $18,537. About 2.2% of families and 2.9% of the population were below the poverty line, including 3.6% of those under age 18 and none of those age 65 or over.

== Education ==
Ridgeway has a public library, a branch of the Ridgemont Public Library.

== Government ==
In the elections of November 2007, Robert Kelly was elected mayor without opposition, and Richard Ray was elected to the village council. Kelly Kelly was elected clerk-treasurer without opposition.

== Transportation ==
State Route 292 passes through Ridgeway from north to south.
