= River Valley Local School District =

School district in Ohio

Address
- 197 Brockelsby Road Caledonia, Ohio, 43314; United States
- Coordinates: 40°38′10″N 82°58′9″W

District information
- Type: Public
- Grades: PK–12
- Schools: 4
- NCES District ID: 3904844

Students and staff
- Students: 1,821 (2024–2025)
- Teachers: 101.68 (on an FTE basis) (2024–2025)
- Staff: 115.73 (on an FTE basis) (2024–2025)
- Student–teacher ratio: 17.91 (2024–2025)

Other information
- Website: www.rvk12.org

The River Valley Local School district (abbreviated RVLSD) is a public school district serving students in and around the village of Caledonia in Marion County, Ohio, United States. As of June 2020, the superintendent of the schools is Mr. Adam Wickham. As of October 2017, the school district enrolls 1,934 students. In addition to Caledonia, the school district includes the communities of Claridon, Martel, Waldo, and eastern Marion. The school district gained some controversy in the late 90s and early 2000s when there was a possibility of cancer-causing chemicals contaminating the grounds of the old high school and middle school campuses.

== Schools ==
=== Elementary schools ===
- Heritage Elementary School (Grades K through 5th)
- Liberty Elementary School (Grades K through 5th)

=== Middle schools ===
- River Valley Middle School (Grades 6th through 8th)

=== High schools ===
- River Valley High School (Grades 9th through 12th)

== History ==
The River Valley Local School District was founded in 1964 when the River Valley High School and Junior High School were created, along with adding Caledonia Elementary School, Claridon Elementary School, Martel Elementary School, and Waldo Elementary School to the district. Martel Elementary School was closed in the 1980s and remaining students from that community began attending Caledonia Elementary. In 2003 the new high school, middle school, and 2 elementary campuses were completed in new locations. Currently there are only two elementary schools - Heritage Elementary and Liberty Elementary. The Waldo, Claridon, and Caledonia elementary buildings have since been demolished for community safety purposes.
