= Marion County Courthouse (Ohio) =

Local government building in the United States

- U.S. National Register of Historic Places
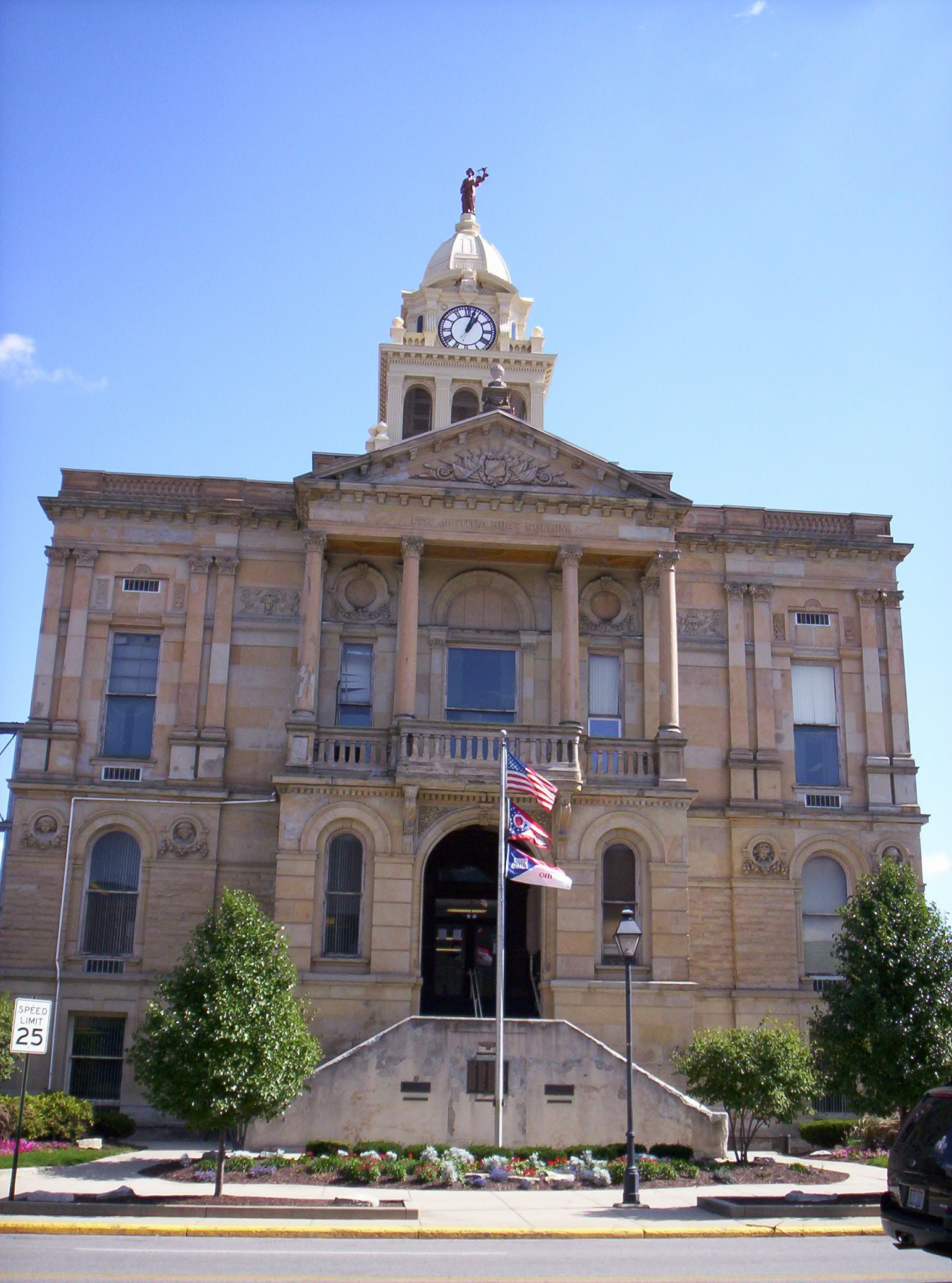
- Western front of the courthouse

- Location within Ohio Location within the United States
- Interactive map showing the location of Marion County Courthouse
- Location: Courthouse Sq., Marion, Ohio
- Coordinates: 40°35′20″N 83°7′42″W
- Built: 1884
- Architect: David W. Gibbs
- NRHP reference No.: 74001572
- Added to NRHP: July 25, 1974

The Marion County Courthouse is the seat of government for Marion County, Ohio, United States. The Marion County Courthouse was built during 1884–1886.

Ten niches are decorated with sandstone heads of various figures. Four of them are meant to depict various races—a white woman, an African man, an Asian man, and an American Indian man. Other heads include two settler girls and a settler woman, plus a head similar to depictions of William Shakespeare.

In the 1970s, county officials announced a plan to perform extensive changes the building's interior, which had previously experienced few modifications since construction. The Marion County Historical Society protested the plans and aroused substantial public displeasure; preparations were made for a referendum to repeal the plans, and enough local residents signed a ballot petition that it would have qualified for a vote, but no vote was held because Ohio law does not permit referendums of the sort. Numerous original wood carvings and paintings were destroyed, ceilings were dropped, and aluminum doors installed. County officials sought to mollify local ire by retaining the building's exterior, including restoring the statue of Justice atop the tower.
