= Hale Township, Hardin County, Ohio =

Township in Ohio, US

- Township
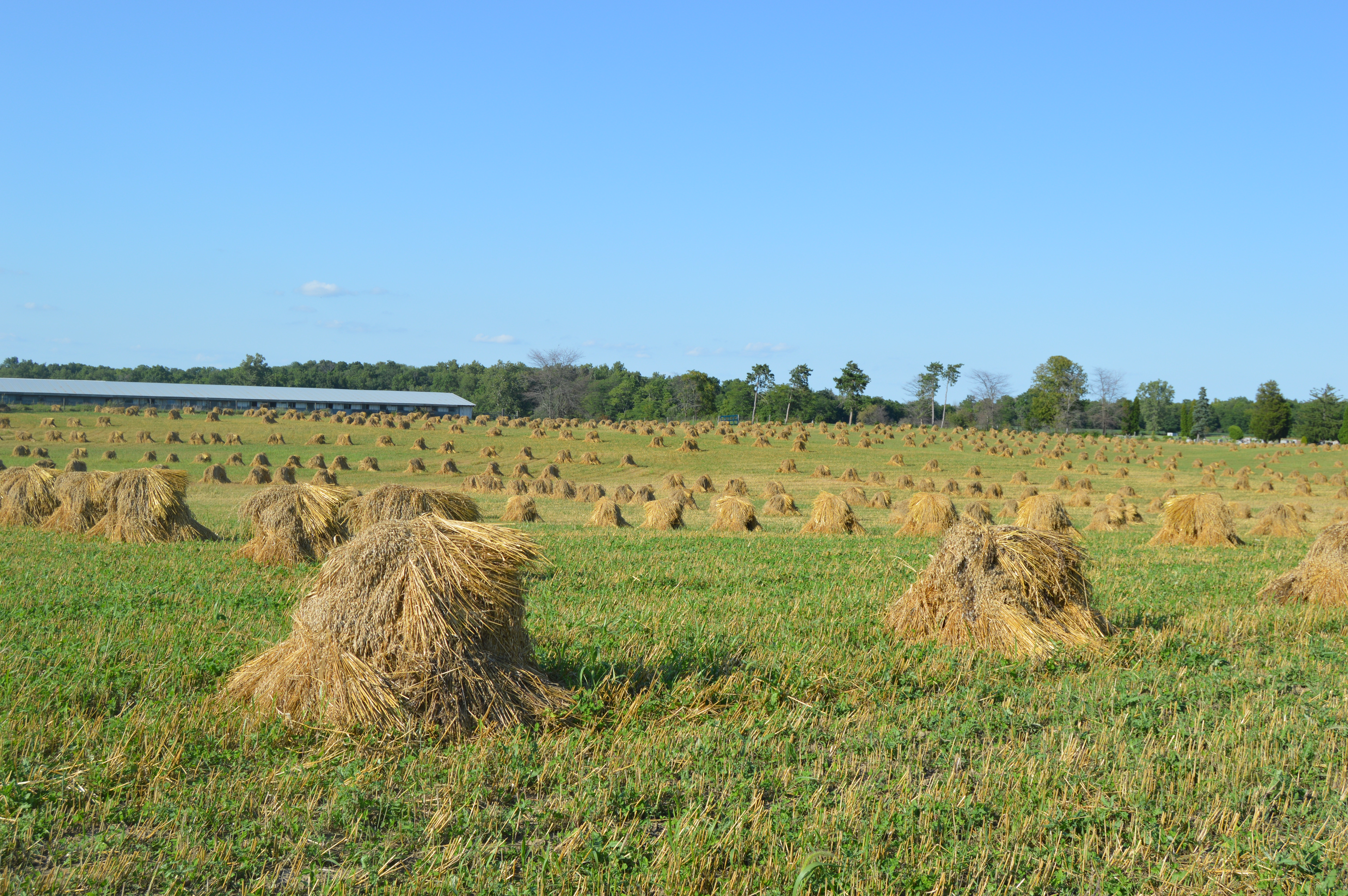
- Shocks of wheat on an Amish farm west of Mount Victory

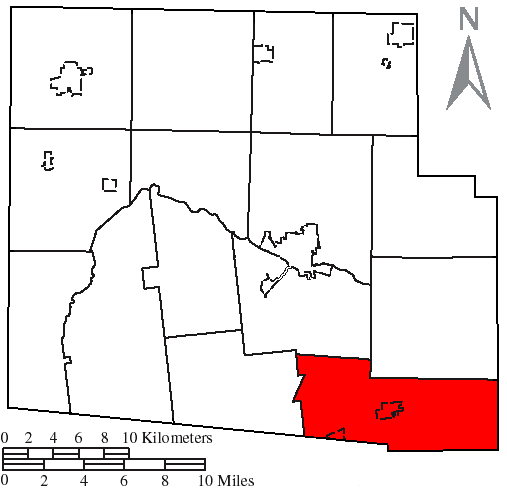
- Location of Hale Township, Hardin County, Ohio
- Coordinates: 40°31′49″N 83°32′13″W
- Country: United States
- State: Ohio
- County: Hardin

Area
  - Total: 36.56 sq mi (94.68 km^{2})
  - Land: 36.54 sq mi (94.63 km^{2})
  - Water: 0.015 sq mi (0.04 km^{2})
- Elevation: 1,050 ft (320 m)

Population (2020)
  - Total: 1,537
  - Density: 42.07/sq mi (16.24/km^{2})
- Time zone: UTC-5 (Eastern (EST))
  - Summer (DST): UTC-4 (EDT)
- FIPS code: 39-32837
- GNIS feature ID: 1086261

Hale Township is one of the fifteen townships of Hardin County, Ohio, United States. As of the 2020 census the population was 1,537.

== Geography ==
Located in the southeastern corner of the county, it borders the following townships:

- Dudley Township - north
- Bowling Green Township, Marion County - east
- Washington Township, Union County - southeast
- Bokescreek Township, Logan County - southwest
- Taylor Creek Township - west
- Buck Township - northwest

Two villages are located in Hale Township: Mount Victory in the center, and part of Ridgeway in the southeast along the border with Bokescreek Township.

== Name and history ==
Hale Township was established in 1835. It is the only Hale Township statewide.

== Government ==
The township is governed by a three-member board of trustees, who are elected in November of odd-numbered years to a four-year term beginning on the following January 1. Two are elected in the year after the presidential election and one is elected in the year before it. There is also an elected township fiscal officer, who serves a four-year term beginning on April 1 of the year after the election, which is held in November of the year before the presidential election. Vacancies in the fiscal officership or on the board of trustees are filled by the remaining trustees.
