= Dudley Township, Ohio =

Township in Ohio, US

Dudley Township, Hardin County, Ohio
- Township
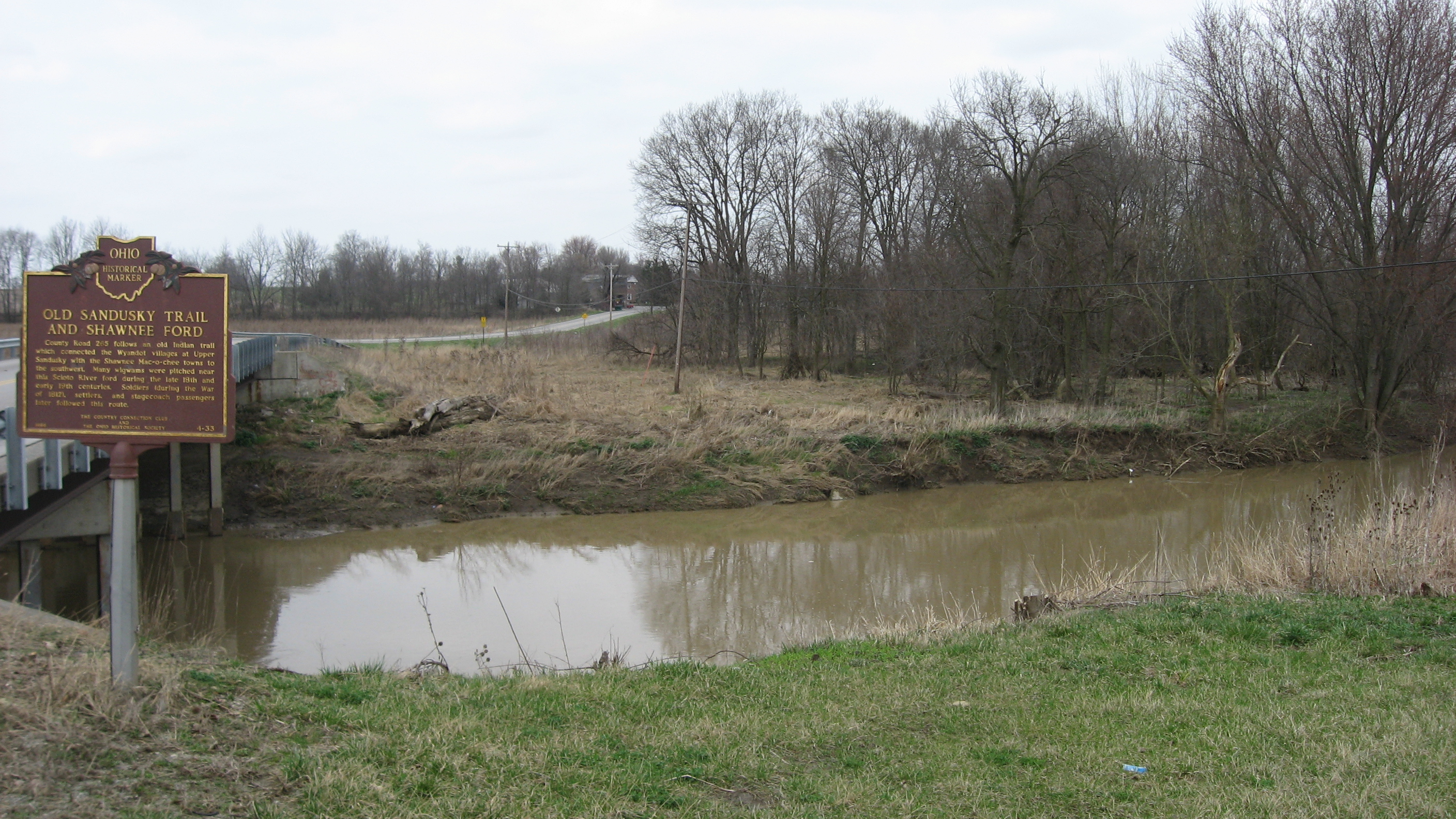
- Shawnee Ford at the Scioto River, a historic site in the township

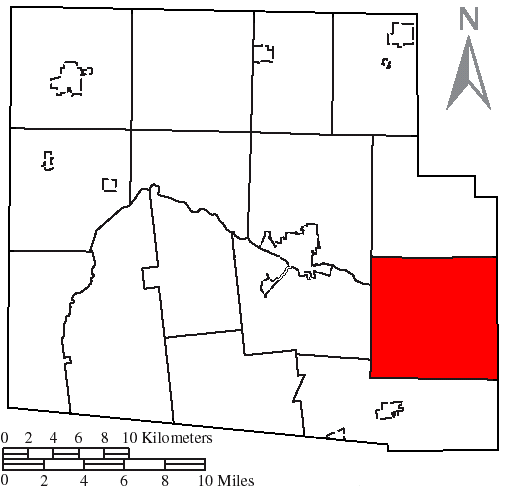
- Location of Dudley Township, Hardin County, Ohio
- Coordinates: 40°35′38″N 83°29′3″W
- Country: United States
- State: Ohio
- County: Hardin

Area
  - Total: 37.37 sq mi (96.78 km^{2})
  - Land: 37.36 sq mi (96.75 km^{2})
  - Water: 0.015 sq mi (0.04 km^{2})
- Elevation: 948 ft (289 m)

Population (2020)
  - Total: 1,490
  - Density: 39.9/sq mi (15.4/km^{2})
- Time zone: UTC-5 (Eastern (EST))
  - Summer (DST): UTC-4 (EDT)
- FIPS code: 39-22736
- GNIS feature ID: 1086259

Dudley Township is one of the fifteen townships of Hardin County, Ohio, United States. As of the 2020 census the population was 1,490.

== Geography ==
Located in the southeastern part of the county, it borders the following townships:

- Goshen Township - north
- Grand Township, Marion County - northeast corner
- Montgomery Township, Marion County - east
- Bowling Green Township, Marion County - southeast
- Hale Township - south
- Buck Township - west
- Pleasant Township - northwest

No municipalities are located in Dudley Township, although the unincorporated community of Hepburn lies in the township's north.

== Name and history ==
Dudley Township was established in the 1830s, and named for Moses Dudley, a pioneer settler. It is the only Dudley Township statewide.

== Government ==
The township is governed by a three-member board of trustees, who are elected in November of odd-numbered years to a four-year term beginning on the following January 1. Two are elected in the year after the presidential election and one is elected in the year before it. There is also an elected township fiscal officer, who serves a four-year term beginning on April 1 of the year after the election, which is held in November of the year before the presidential election. Vacancies in the fiscal officership or on the board of trustees are filled by the remaining trustees.
