= Tobias, Ohio =

- Unincorporated community
- Location within Ohio Location within the United States
- Coordinates: 40°41′18″N 83°03′59″W
- Country: United States
- State: Ohio
- County: Marion
- Township: Scott
- Elevation: 971 ft (296 m)
- Time zone: UTC-5 (Eastern (EST))
  - Summer (DST): UTC-4 (EDT)
- ZIP Code: 43302 (Marion)
- Area code: 740
- GNIS feature ID: 1063061

Tobias is an unincorporated community in Scott Township, Marion County, Ohio, United States. It is located northeast of Marion at the intersection of Tobias Road and Morral-Kirkpatrick Road.

The Tobias Post Office was established on May 3, 1894, and discontinued on September 30, 1905. Mail service is now handled through the Marion branch. In 1922, there was a grain elevator in operation here.
