= Salt Rock Township, Marion County, Ohio =

Township in Ohio, US

- Township
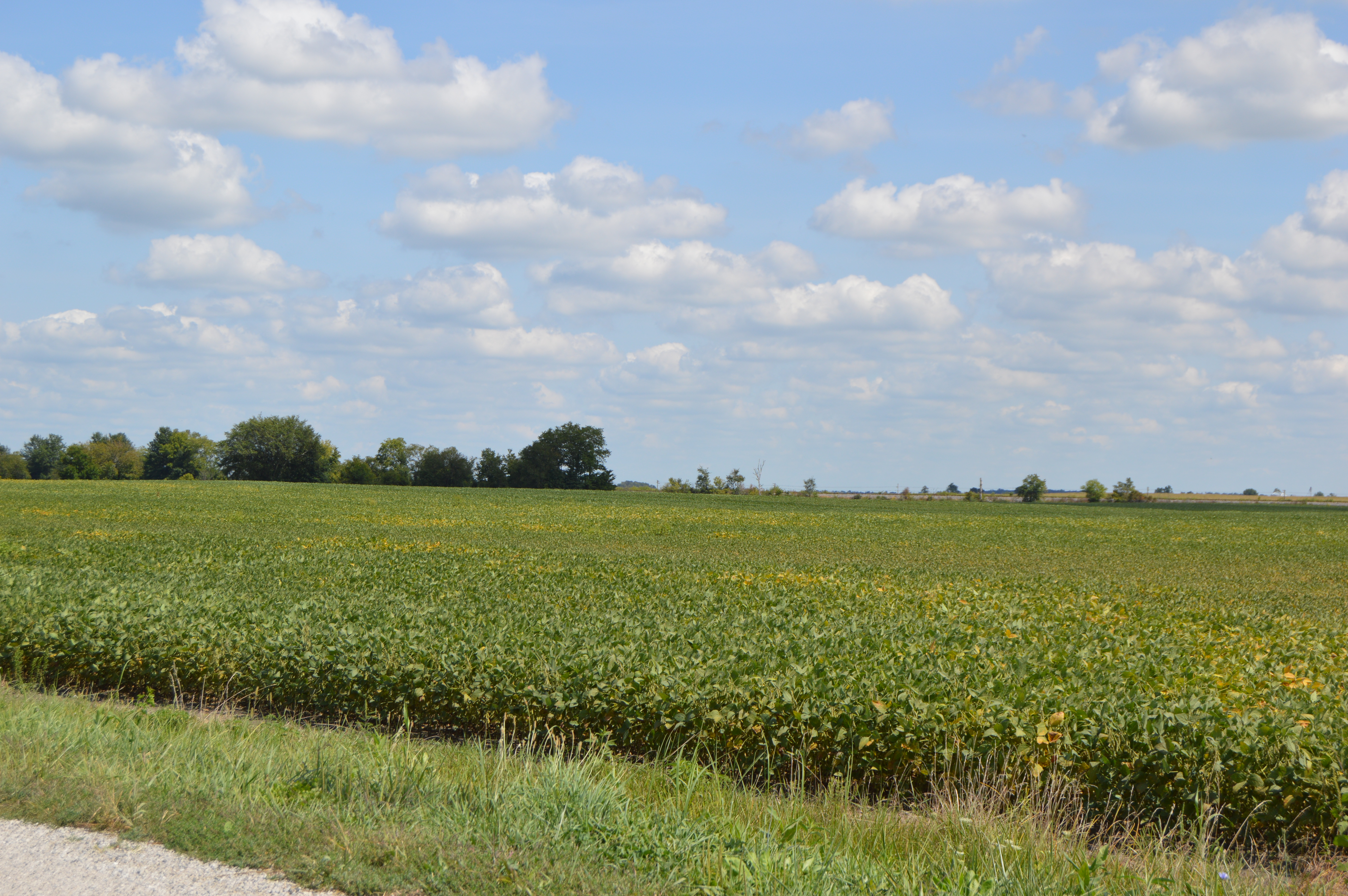
- Fields south of Morral

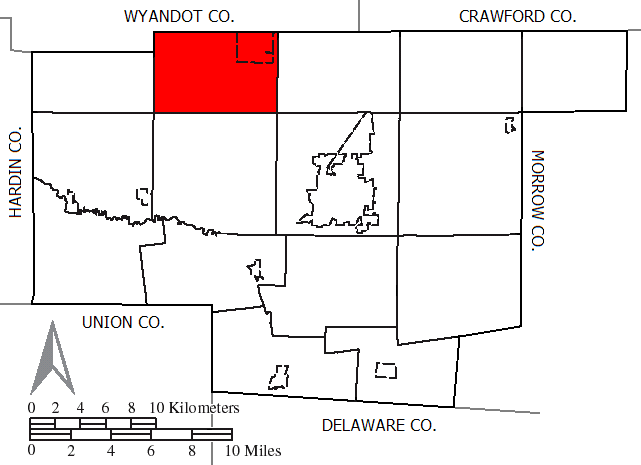
- Location of Salt Rock Township in Marion County
- Coordinates: 40°41′11″N 83°13′30″W
- Country: United States
- State: Ohio
- County: Marion

Area
  - Total: 24.6 sq mi (63.6 km^{2})
  - Land: 24.6 sq mi (63.6 km^{2})
  - Water: 0 sq mi (0.0 km^{2})
- Elevation: 912 ft (278 m)

Population (2020)
  - Total: 605
  - Density: 24.6/sq mi (9.51/km^{2})
- Time zone: UTC-5 (Eastern (EST))
  - Summer (DST): UTC-4 (EDT)
- FIPS code: 39-70240
- GNIS feature ID: 1086585

Salt Rock Township is one of the fifteen townships of Marion County, Ohio, United States. The 2020 census found 605 people in the township, 373 of whom lived in the village of Morral.

== Geography ==
Located in the northern part of the county, it borders the following townships:

- Pitt Township, Wyandot County - north
- Antrim Township, Wyandot County - northeast corner
- Grand Prairie Township - east
- Marion Township - southeast corner
- Big Island Township - south
- Montgomery Township - southwest corner
- Grand Township - west
- Marseilles Township, Wyandot County - northwest

The village of Morral is located in northeastern Salt Rock Township.

== Name and history ==
It is the only Salt Rock Township statewide.

== Government ==
The township is governed by a three-member board of trustees, who are elected in November of odd-numbered years to a four-year term beginning on the following January 1. Two are elected in the year after the presidential election and one is elected in the year before it. There is also an elected township fiscal officer, who serves a four-year term beginning on April 1 of the year after the election, which is held in November of the year before the presidential election. Vacancies in the fiscal officership or on the board of trustees are filled by the remaining trustees.

== Notable residents ==
- John Purdue 1802–1876, born in Huntingdon County, Pennsylvania. He was a famous industrialist based in Lafayette, Indiana and the primary original benefactor of Purdue University.
