= Centerville, Marion County, Ohio =

Centerville, Ohio
- Unincorporated community
- Location within Ohio Location within the United States
- Coordinates: 40°29′41″N 83°14′36″W
- Country: United States
- State: Ohio
- Counties: Marion
- Township: Prospect
- Elevation: 942 ft (287 m)
- Time zone: UTC-5 (Eastern (EST))
  - Summer (DST): UTC-4 (EDT)
- ZIP Code: 43342 (Prospect)
- Area code: 740
- GNIS feature ID: 1056784

Centerville is an unincorporated community in Prospect Township, Marion County, Ohio, United States. It is located about 10 miles (16 km) southwest of Marion at the intersection of Centerville-Green Camp Road and Centerville-Newmans Road.

== History ==
Centerville was originally laid out by George Clay in 1863 along the New York, Pennsylvania and Ohio Railroad. As of 1883, the community contained one grocery store, one sawmill, a grain warehouse, a schoolhouse, a railroad station/post office, and about 12 homes.
