= Moses Fowler House =

Historic house in Indiana, United States

- U.S. National Register of Historic Places
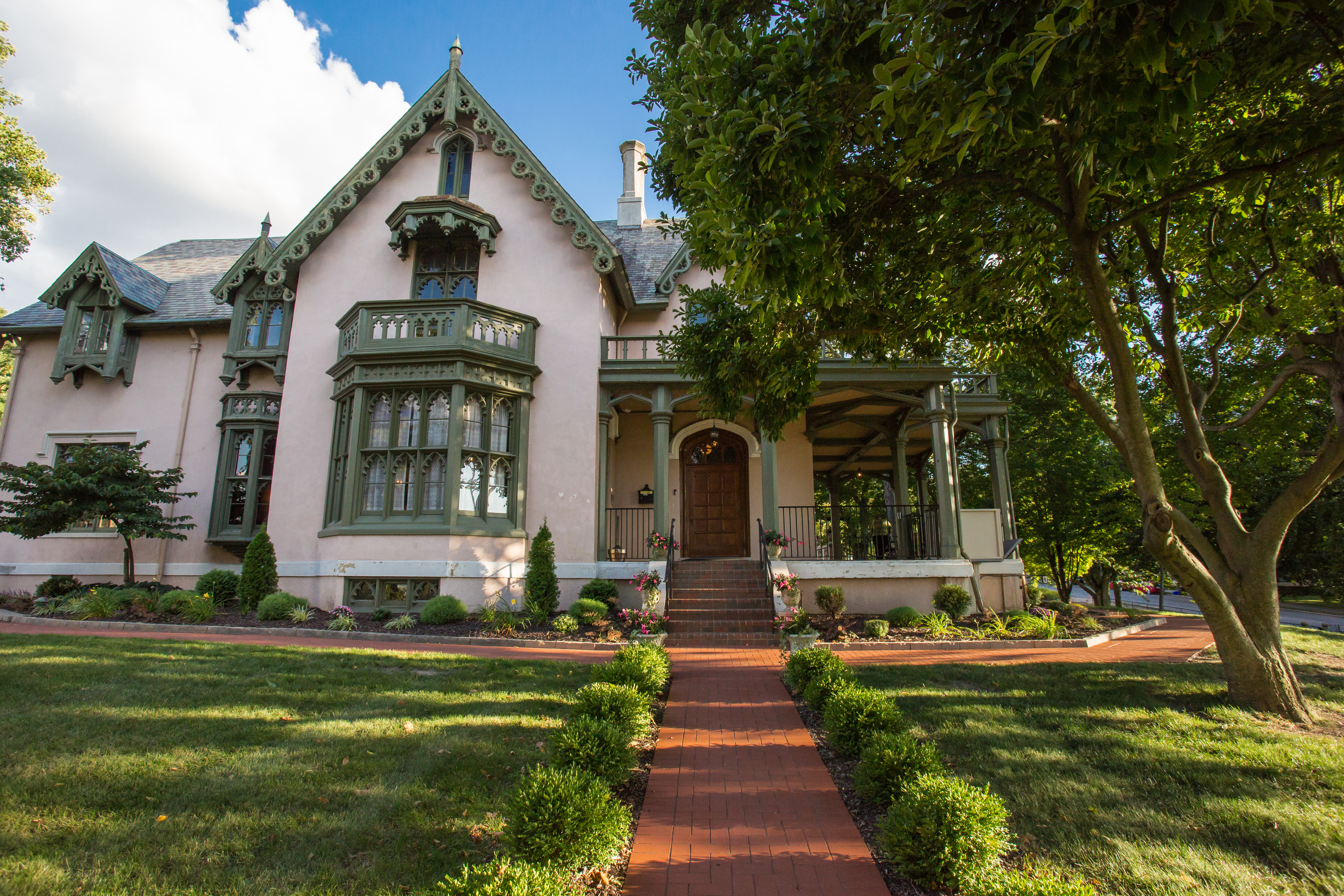
- Front of the house in 2017

- Location within Tippecanoe County, Indiana Location within Indiana Location within the United States
- Location: Corner of 10th and South Sts., Lafayette, Indiana
- Coordinates: 40°25′0″N 86°53′10″W
- Area: less than one acre
- Built: 1852
- Architectural style: Gothic Revival
- NRHP reference No.: 71000009
- Added to NRHP: August 5, 1971

The Moses Fowler House is located at the corner of 10th and South streets in Lafayette, Indiana, United States. The house is considered the finest example of a large Gothic Revival residence still standing in the United States. Upon his death in 1889, aged 74, Fowler had accumulated a fortune of an estimated three million dollars. Fowler and his wife, Eliza, were donors to various community interests, including Purdue University.

The house was built by Moses Fowler in 1851–1852. Locally harvested black walnut and white oak were used for the ornately carved woodwork. Italian immigrant craftsmen were brought via the Wabash and Erie Canal from New York City to execute the plasterwork ceilings in the north and south parlors. When completed it was one of the finest houses in Indiana. The designs for the house were principally taken from a copy of Andrew Jackson Downing’s book The Architecture of Country Houses, c. 1851, which Fowler purchased while on a business trip in New York City.

Fowler originally came to Lafayette in 1839 from Circleville, Ohio, with his friend and business partner John Purdue (founder of Purdue University) and engaged in the dry goods business. The business lasted until 1844, when the duo parted to pursue different goals. Over the years a number of business pursuits made him very wealthy. These included the wholesale business, cattle ranching, the railroads, and banking.

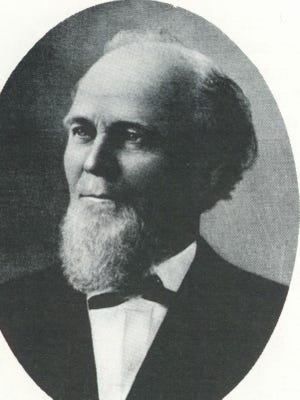
Moses Fowler, circa 1880

Both Moses and Eliza are interred in Lafayette's Spring Vale Cemetery.

In 1902, upon the death of his grandmother, Moses and Eliza's grandson, Cecil G. Fowler (son of James and Eva Fowler), inherited the house and he and his wife Louise made it their residence. Cecil had followed his father and grandfather into banking but was also a developer. He partnered with Carl Fischer (developer of the Indianapolis Motor Speedway) to build the first luxury hotel in Miami Beach, Florida, which opened on New Year's Eve 1920. In 1916–17, the Fowlers moved out of the house while significant renovations and additions were completed. During this time a large Tudor-style formal dining room and living room were added, along with an indoor kitchen, laundry, garage, and servants quarters. The upstairs now included seven bedrooms and five bathrooms. These included a new guest bedroom, master suite, and servants bedrooms. Outside, a large Italian-style tiered patio with fountains, a reflecting pool, a tea house, and formal gardens were added. The Fowlers loved to entertain and were well known locally for the large and extravagant parties they hosted. In 1940, with their children grown, the Fowlers sold the house to the Tippecanoe County Historical Association.

From 1940 until 2015, the Moses Fowler House was the home of the Tippecanoe County Historical Association and used at various times as a museum, offices, and for collections storage.

In 2015, The 1852 Foundation (a 501(c)(3) non-profit public charity) was founded through the generosity of Matt and Dr. Ann Jonkman. The 1852 Foundation purchased the Fowler House Mansion and from 2015 to 2018 completed over $1.3 million in restorations, repairs, code updates, and facility additions in order that the house could be open to and used by the public for tours and as an events venue.

== Gallery ==
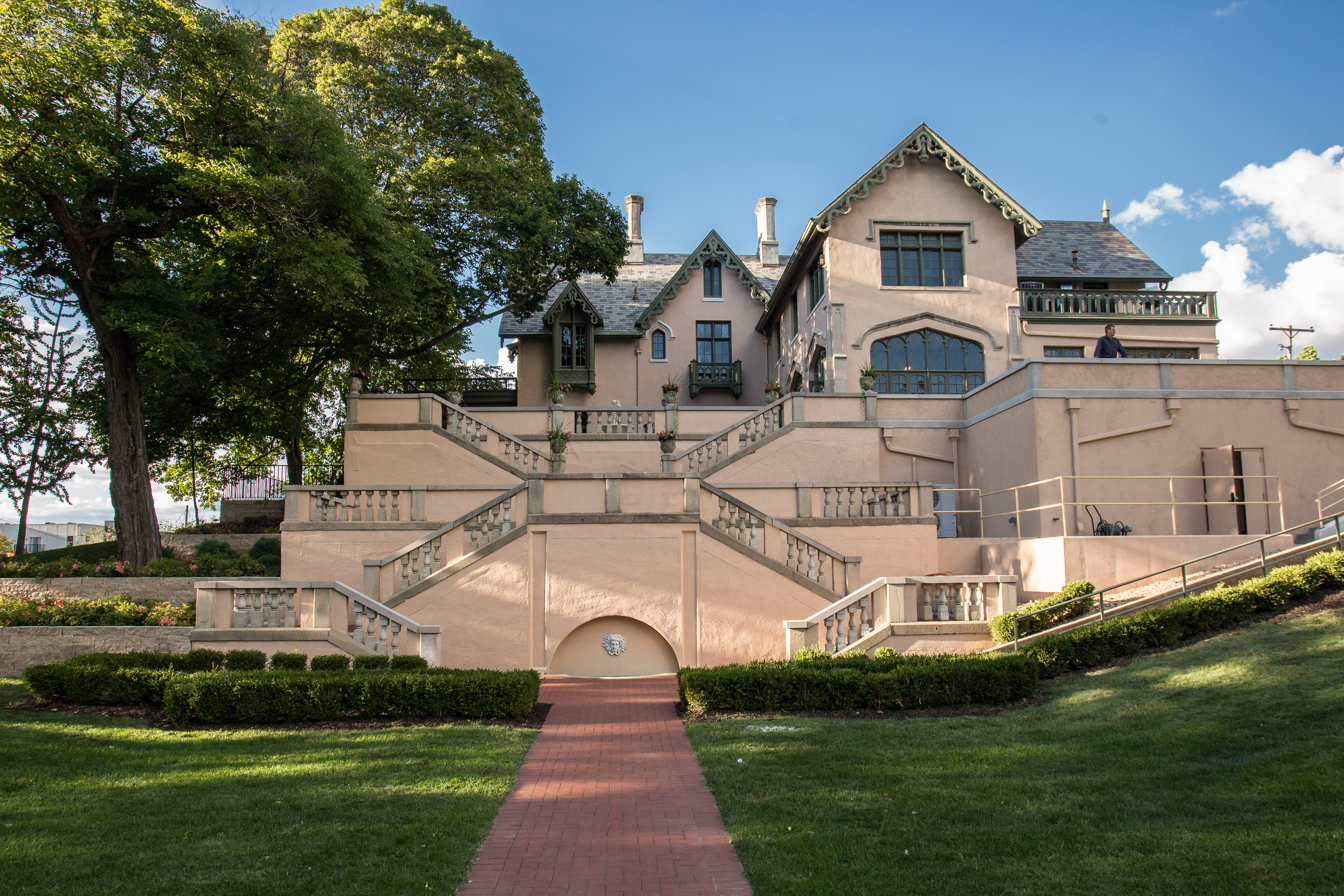

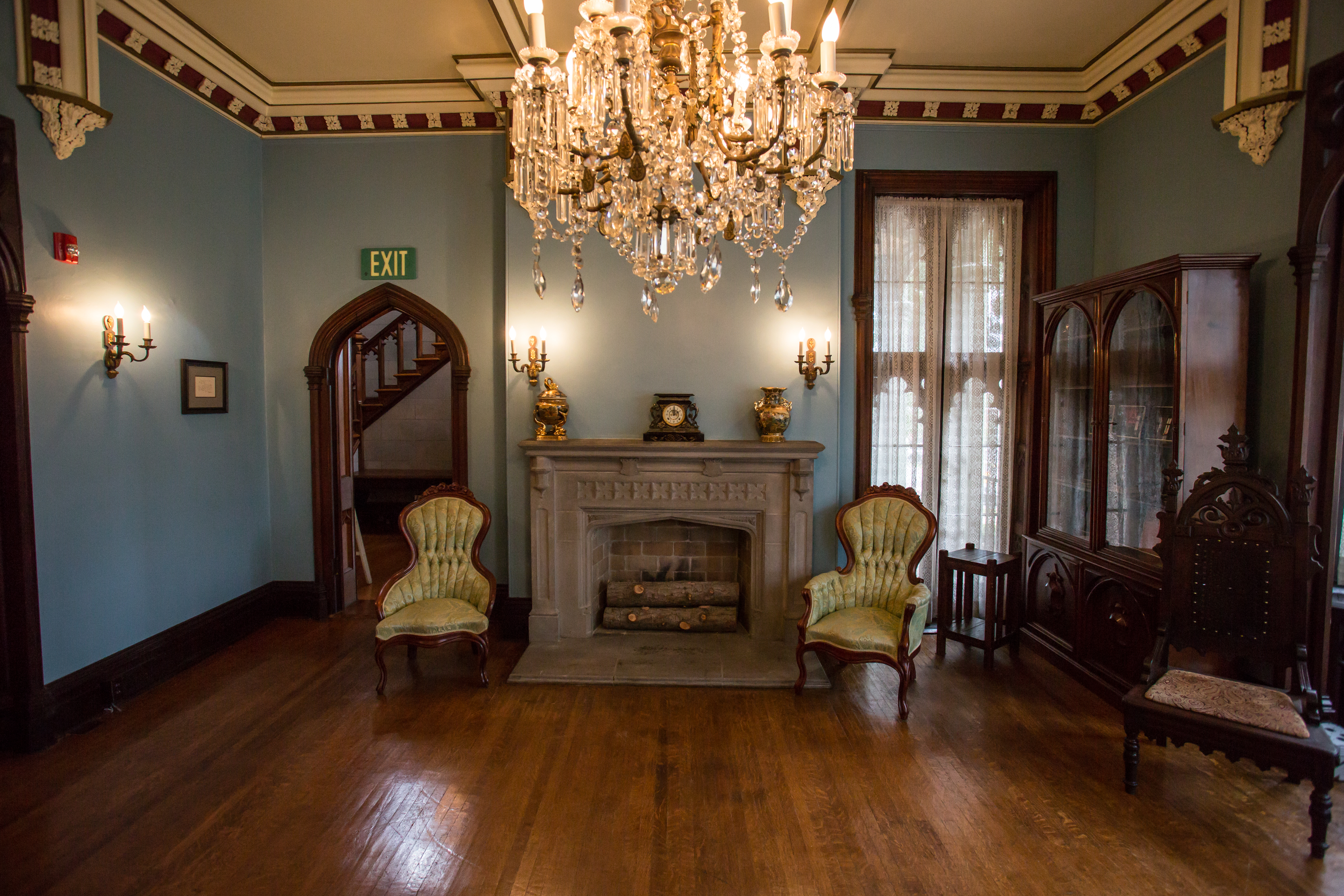

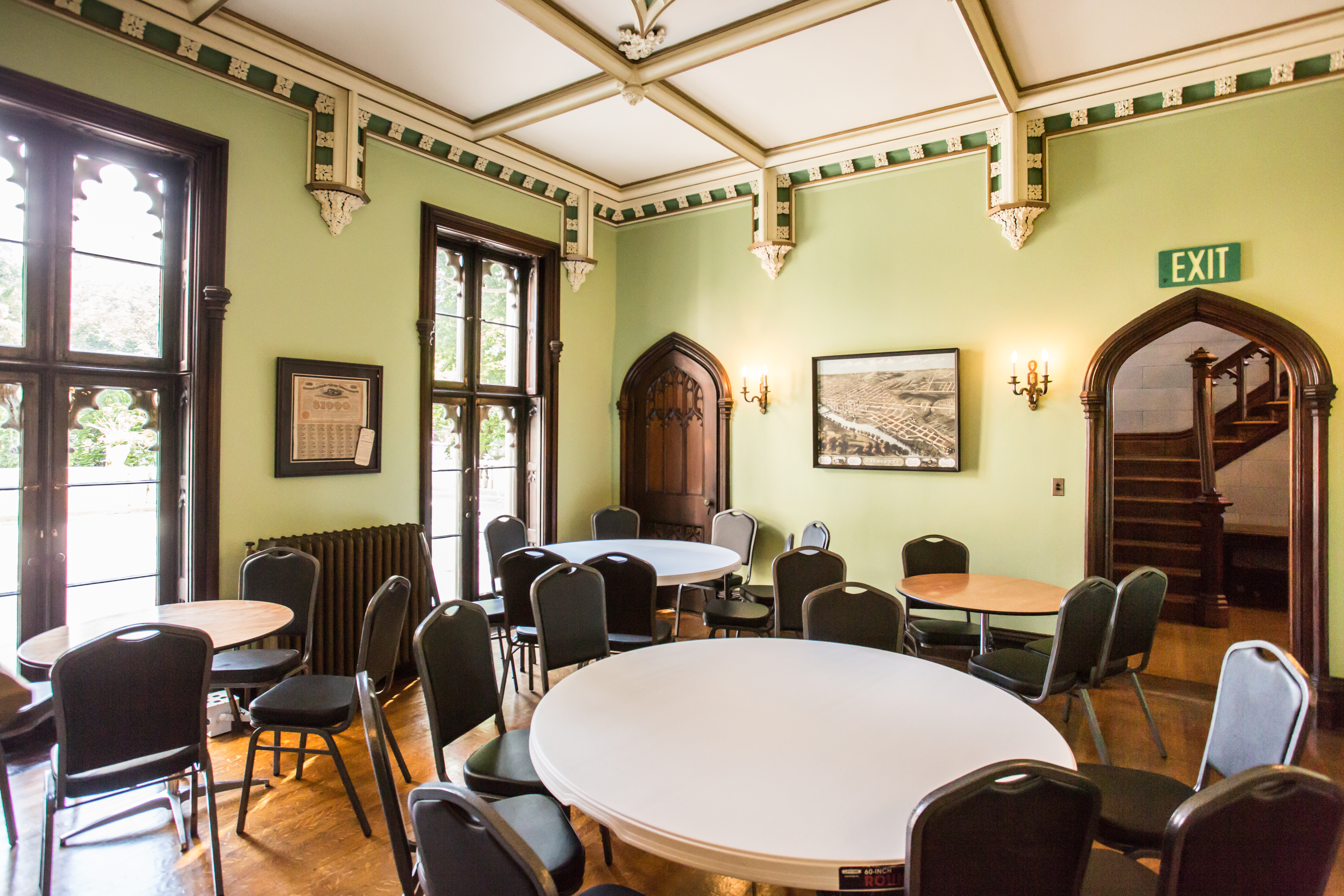

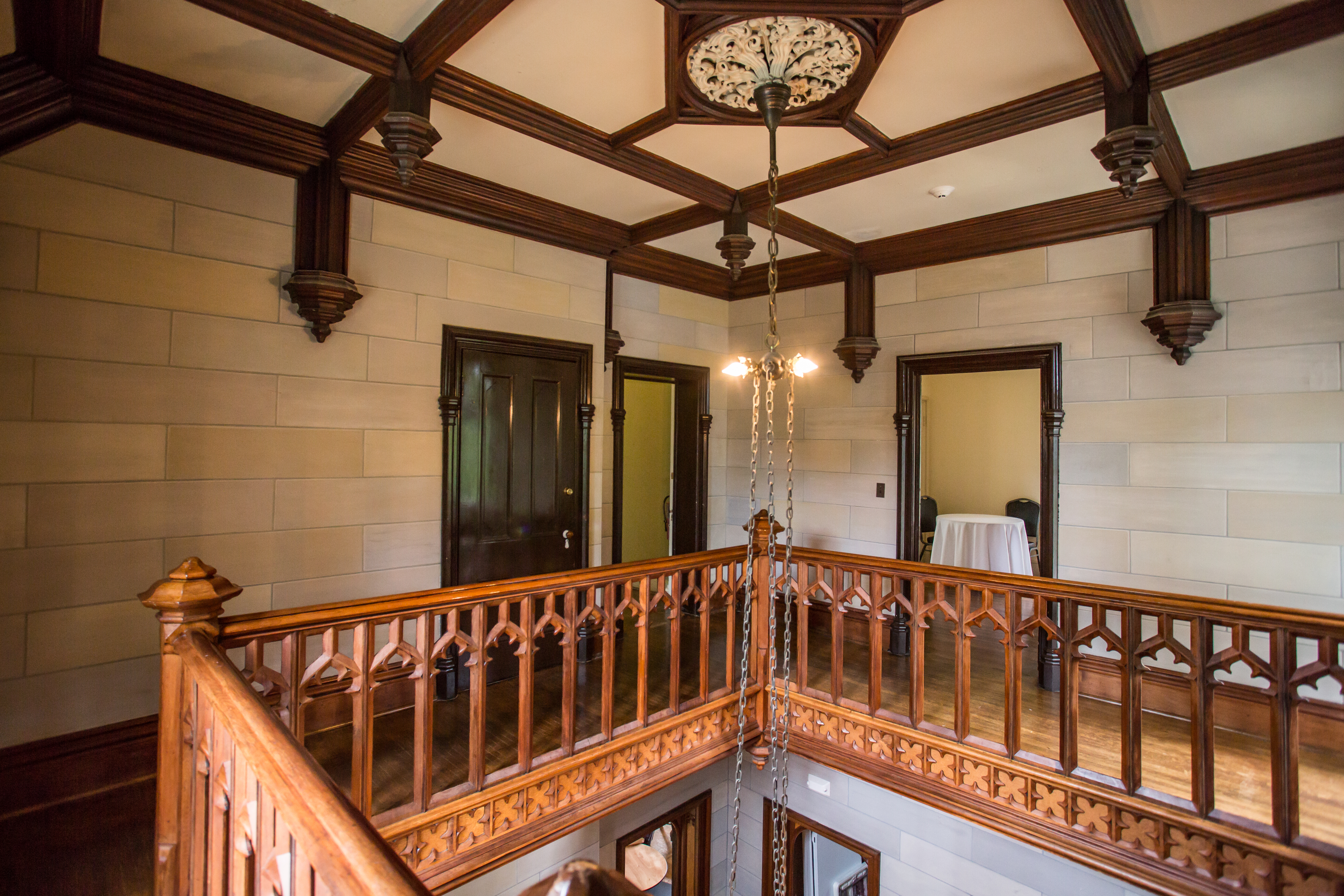

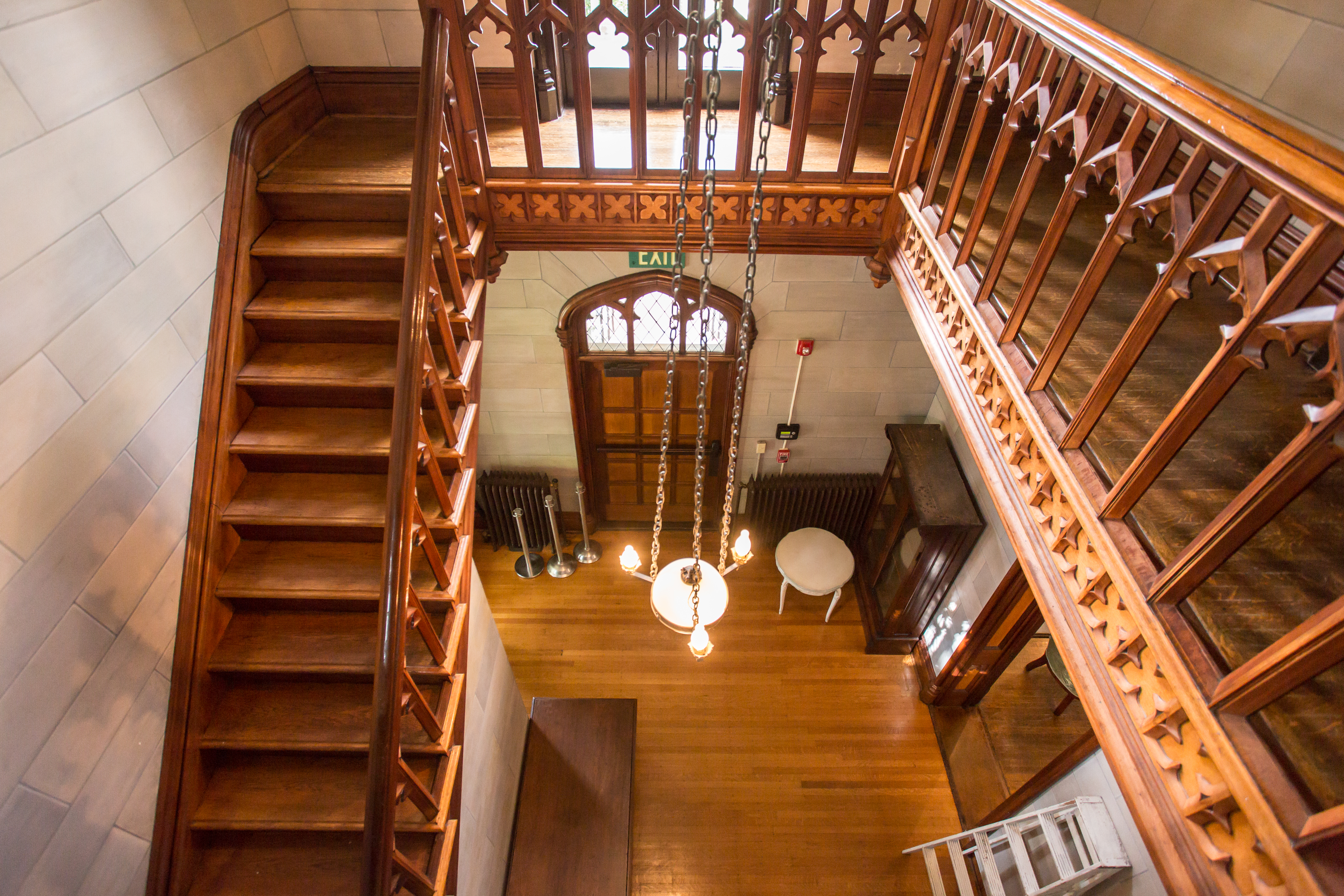

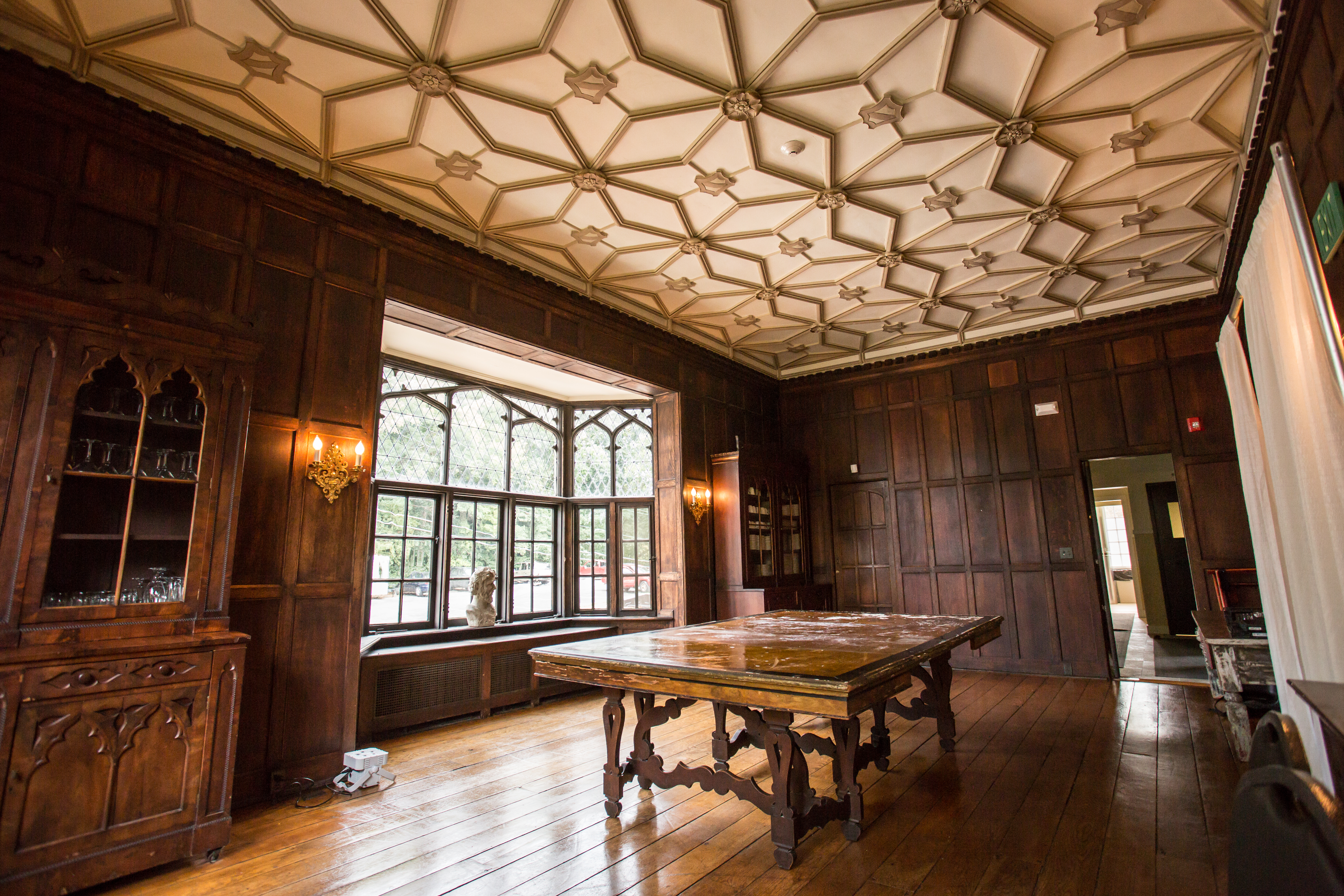
