= Grand Township, Marion County, Ohio =

Township in Ohio, US

- Township
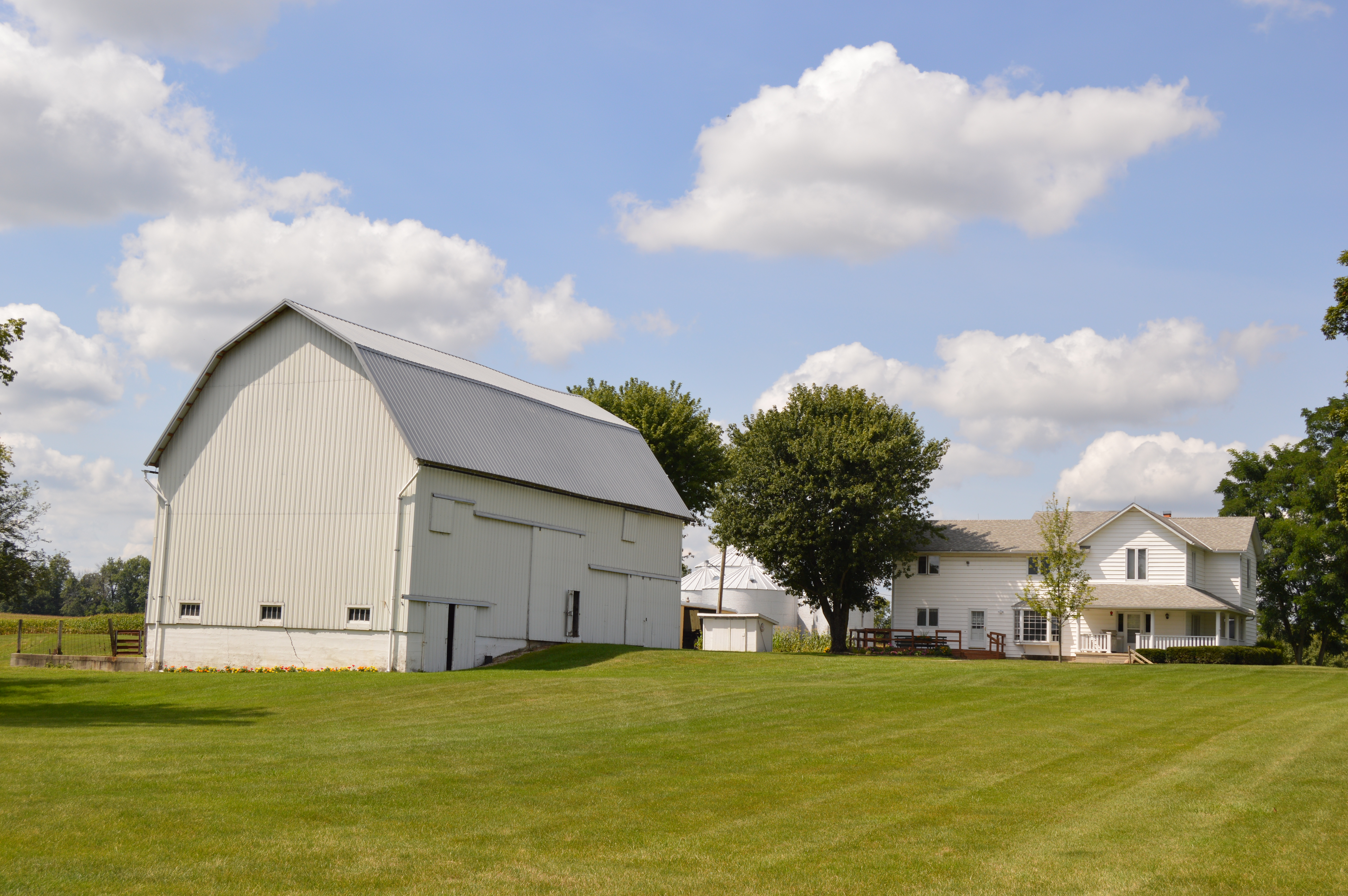
- Farmstead on Irvin Shoots Road

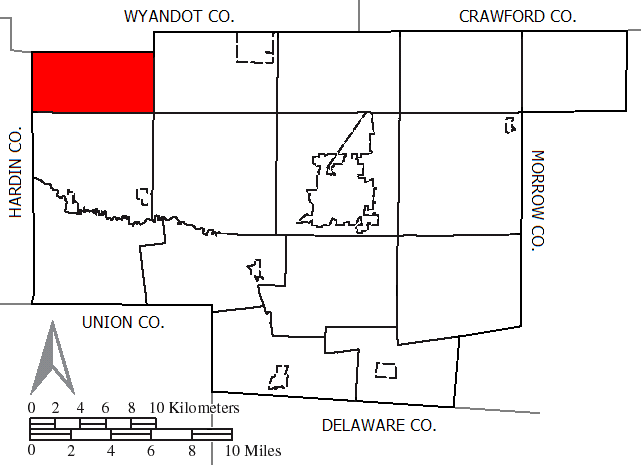
- Location of Grand Township in Marion County
- Coordinates: 40°39′51″N 83°22′8″W
- Country: United States
- State: Ohio
- County: Marion

Area
  - Total: 18.2 sq mi (47.2 km^{2})
  - Land: 18.2 sq mi (47.2 km^{2})
  - Water: 0 sq mi (0.0 km^{2})
- Elevation: 889 ft (271 m)

Population (2020)
  - Total: 373
  - Density: 20.5/sq mi (7.90/km^{2})
- Time zone: UTC-5 (Eastern (EST))
  - Summer (DST): UTC-4 (EDT)
- FIPS code: 39-31178
- GNIS feature ID: 1086577

Grand Township is one of the fifteen townships of Marion County, Ohio, United States. The 2020 census found 373 people in the township.

== Geography ==
Located in the northwestern corner of the county, it borders the following townships:

- Marseilles Township, Wyandot County - north
- Salt Rock Township - east
- Big Island Township - southeast corner
- Montgomery Township - south
- Dudley Township, Hardin County - southwest corner
- Goshen Township, Hardin County - west

No municipalities are located in Grand Township.

== Name and history ==
It is the only Grand Township statewide.

== Government ==
The township is governed by a three-member board of trustees, who are elected in November of odd-numbered years to a four-year term beginning on the following January 1. Two are elected in the year after the presidential election and one is elected in the year before it. There is also an elected township fiscal officer, who serves a four-year term beginning on April 1 of the year after the election, which is held in November of the year before the presidential election. Vacancies in the fiscal officership or on the board of trustees are filled by the remaining trustees.
