= Bowling Green Township, Marion County, Ohio =

Township in Ohio, US

- Township
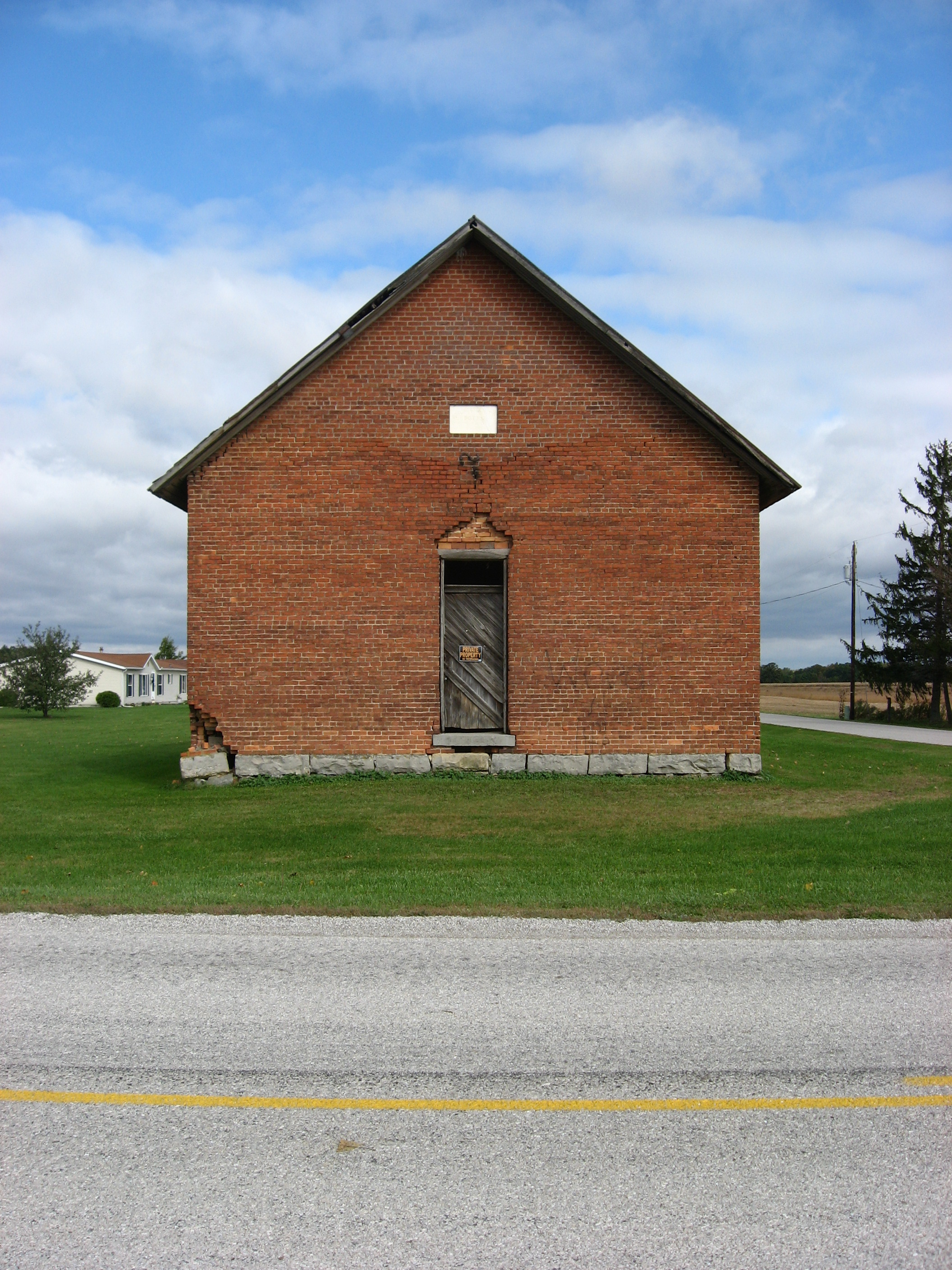
- Former school west of LaRue

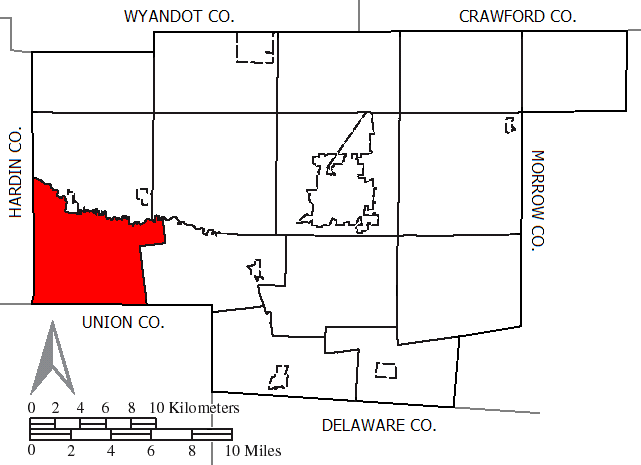
- Location of Bowling Green Township in Marion County
- Coordinates: 40°33′7″N 83°21′55″W
- Country: United States
- State: Ohio
- County: Marion

Area
  - Total: 27.6 sq mi (71.6 km^{2})
  - Land: 27.6 sq mi (71.6 km^{2})
  - Water: 0 sq mi (0.0 km^{2})
- Elevation: 925 ft (282 m)

Population (2020)
  - Total: 603
  - Density: 21.8/sq mi (8.42/km^{2})
- Time zone: UTC-5 (Eastern (EST))
  - Summer (DST): UTC-4 (EDT)
- FIPS code: 39-07958
- GNIS feature ID: 1086575
- Website: https://bgtownship.com/

Bowling Green Township is one of the fifteen townships of Marion County, Ohio, United States. The 2020 census found 603 people in the township.

== Geography ==
Located in the southwestern corner of the county, it borders the following townships:

- Montgomery Township - north
- Big Island Township - northeast
- Green Camp Township - east
- Jackson Township, Union County - south
- Washington Township, Union County - southwest
- Hale Township, Hardin County - west
- Dudley Township, Hardin County - northwest

No municipalities are located in Bowling Green Township.

== Name and history ==
Statewide, the only other Bowling Green Township is located in Licking County.

== Government ==
The township is governed by a three-member board of trustees, who are elected in November of odd-numbered years to a four-year term beginning on the following January 1. Two are elected in the year after the presidential election and one is elected in the year before it. There is also an elected township fiscal officer, who serves a four-year term beginning on April 1 of the year after the election, which is held in November of the year before the presidential election. Vacancies in the fiscal officership or on the board of trustees are filled by the remaining trustees.
