= Marion County, Ohio =

County in Ohio, United States

- County
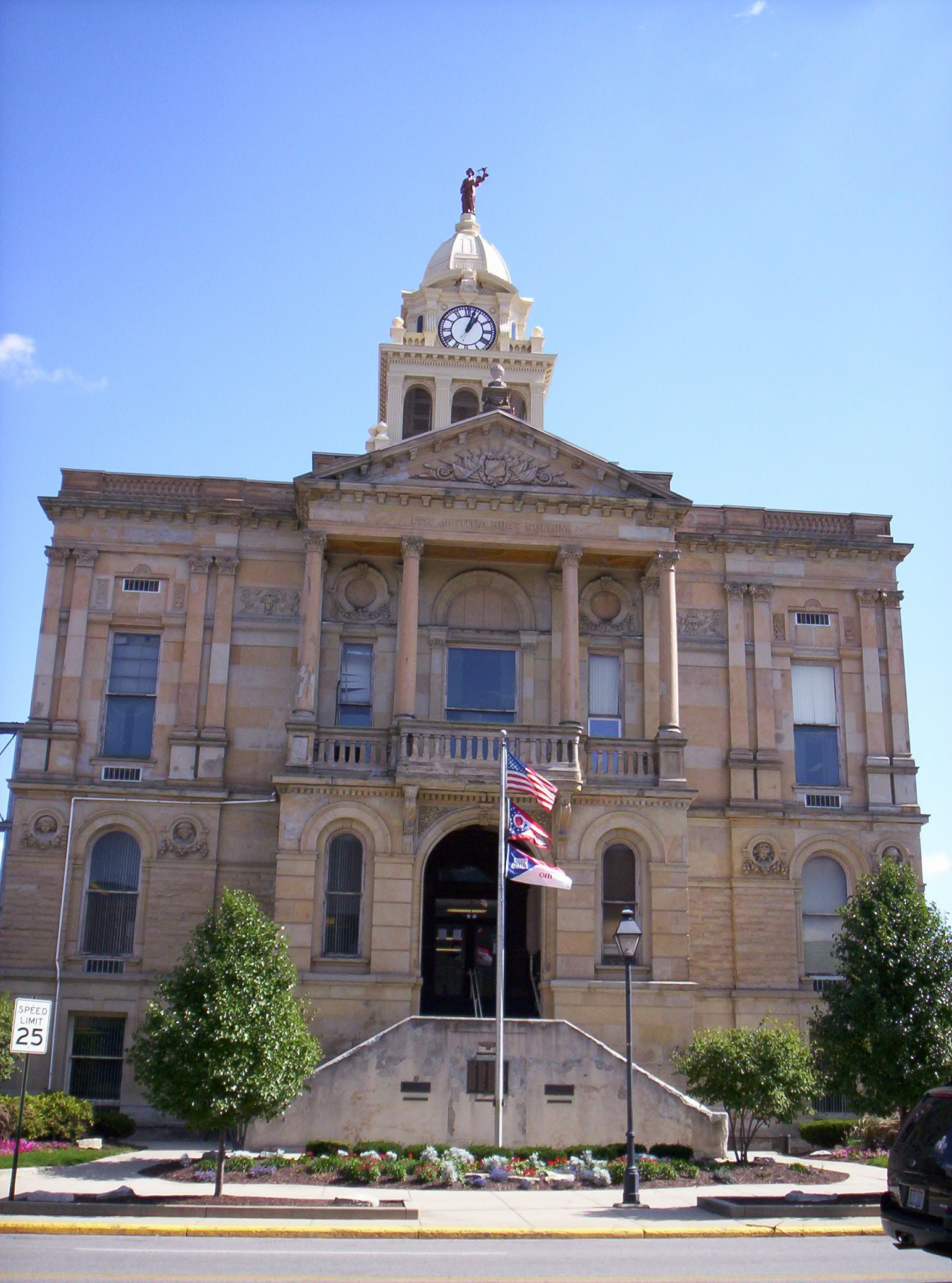
- Marion County Courthouse

- Flag Seal

- Location within the U.S. state of Ohio
- Coordinates: 40°35′N 83°10′W
- Country: United States
- State: Ohio
- Founded: February 20, 1820
- Named for: Francis Marion
- Seat: Marion
- Largest city: Marion

Area
  - Total: 404 sq mi (1,050 km^{2})
  - Land: 404 sq mi (1,050 km^{2})
  - Water: 0.4 sq mi (1.0 km^{2}) 0.1%

Population (2020)
  - Total: 65,359
  - Estimate (2025): 65,115 ▼
  - Density: 162/sq mi (62.5/km^{2})
- Time zone: UTC−5 (Eastern)
  - Summer (DST): UTC−4 (EDT)
- Congressional district: 4th
- Website: www.co.marion.oh.us

Marion County is a county located in the U.S. state of Ohio. As of the 2020 census, the population was 65,359. Its county seat is Marion. The county was erected by the state of Ohio on February 20, 1820 and later reorganized in 1824. It is named for General Francis "Swamp Fox" Marion, a South Carolinian officer in the Revolutionary War. Marion County comprises the Marion, OH Micropolitan Statistical Area, which is also included in the Columbus-Marion-Zanesville, OH Combined Statistical Area.

== Geography ==
According to the U.S. Census Bureau, the county has a total area of 404 square miles (1,050 km^{2}), of which 404 square miles (1,050 km^{2}) is land and 0.4 square miles (1.0 km^{2}) (0.1%) is water. It is the fifth-smallest county in Ohio by total area.

=== Adjacent counties ===
- Crawford County (northeast)
- Morrow County (east)
- Delaware County (south)
- Union County (southwest)
- Hardin County (west)
- Wyandot County (northwest)

=== Major highways ===
- US 23
- SR 4
- SR 37
- SR 47
- SR 95
- SR 98
- SR 100
- SR 203
- SR 231
- SR 309
- SR 423
- SR 529
- SR 739
- SR 746

== Demographics ==
Historical population
Census	Pop.	Note	%±
1830	6,551		—
1840	14,765		125.4%
1850	12,618		−14.5%
1860	15,490		22.8%
1870	16,184		4.5%
1880	20,565		27.1%
1890	24,727		20.2%
1900	28,678		16.0%
1910	33,971		18.5%
1920	42,004		23.6%
1930	45,420		8.1%
1940	44,898		−1.1%
1950	49,959		11.3%
1960	60,221		20.5%
1970	64,724		7.5%
1980	67,974		5.0%
1990	64,274		−5.4%
2000	66,217		3.0%
2010	66,501		0.4%
2020	65,359		−1.7%
2025 (est.)	65,115	▼	−0.4%
U.S. Decennial Census; 1790-1960 1900-1990; 1990-2000 2020

=== 2020 census ===
As of the 2020 census, the county had a population of 65,359. The median age was 41.2 years. 21.0% of residents were under the age of 18 and 18.5% of residents were 65 years of age or older. For every 100 females there were 112.8 males, and for every 100 females age 18 and over there were 114.7 males age 18 and over.

The racial makeup of the county was 86.8% White, 6.3% Black or African American, 0.3% American Indian and Alaska Native, 0.6% Asian, <0.1% Native Hawaiian and Pacific Islander, 1.3% from some other race, and 4.7% from two or more races. Hispanic or Latino residents of any race comprised 3.0% of the population.

65.3% of residents lived in urban areas, while 34.7% lived in rural areas.

There were 24,932 households in the county, of which 28.4% had children under the age of 18 living in them. Of all households, 44.1% were married-couple households, 19.2% were households with a male householder and no spouse or partner present, and 27.7% were households with a female householder and no spouse or partner present. About 29.2% of all households were made up of individuals and 13.5% had someone living alone who was 65 years of age or older.

There were 27,348 housing units, of which 8.8% were vacant. Among occupied housing units, 66.3% were owner-occupied and 33.7% were renter-occupied. The homeowner vacancy rate was 1.7% and the rental vacancy rate was 9.5%.

=== Racial and ethnic composition ===
Marion County, Ohio – Racial and ethnic composition Note: the US Census treats Hispanic/Latino as an ethnic category. This table excludes Latinos from the racial categories and assigns them to a separate category. Hispanics/Latinos may be of any race.
Race / Ethnicity (NH = Non-Hispanic)	Pop 1980	Pop 1990	Pop 2000	Pop 2010	Pop 2020	% 1980	% 1990	% 2000	% 2010	% 2020
White alone (NH)	64,906	60,644	60,580	59,733	56,114	95.49%	94.35%	91.49%	89.82%	85.86%
Black or African American alone (NH)	2,214	2,688	3,779	3,754	4,051	3.26%	4.18%	5.71%	5.65%	6.20%
Native American or Alaska Native alone (NH)	91	139	120	97	140	0.13%	0.22%	0.18%	0.15%	0.21%
Asian alone (NH)	245	281	340	326	358	0.36%	0.44%	0.51%	0.49%	0.55%
Native Hawaiian or Pacific Islander alone (NH)	x	x	3	27	15	x	x	0.00%	0.04%	0.02%
Other race alone (NH)	110	37	96	56	167	0.16%	0.06%	0.14%	0.08%	0.26%
Mixed race or Multiracial (NH)	x	x	576	1,005	2,558	x	x	0.87%	1.51%	3.91%
Hispanic or Latino (any race)	408	485	723	1,503	1,956	0.60%	0.75%	1.09%	2.26%	2.99%
Total	67,974	64,274	66,217	66,501	65,359	100.00%	100.00%	100.00%	100.00%	100.00%

=== 2010 census ===
As of the 2010 United States census, there were 66,501 people, 24,691 households, and 16,837 families living in the county. The population density was 164.7 inhabitants per square mile (63.6/km^{2}). There were 27,834 housing units at an average density of 68.9 units per square mile (26.6 units/km^{2}). The racial makeup of the county was 91.1% white, 5.7% black or African American, 0.5% Asian, 0.2% American Indian, 0.1% Pacific islander, 0.8% from other races, and 1.7% from two or more races. Those of Hispanic or Latino origin made up 2.3% of the population. In terms of ancestry, 29.7% were German, 15.2% were Irish, 14.7% were American, and 10.2% were English.

Of the 24,691 households, 31.8% had children under the age of 18 living with them, 49.4% were married couples living together, 13.3% had a female householder with no husband present, 31.8% were non-families, and 26.3% of all households were made up of individuals. The average household size was 2.47 and the average family size was 2.94. The median age was 39.9 years.

The median income for a household in the county was $40,511 and the median income for a family was $50,900. Males had a median income of $39,741 versus $30,161 for females. The per capita income for the county was $19,849. About 13.1% of families and 17.3% of the population were below the poverty line, including 24.6% of those under age 18 and 9.4% of those age 65 or over.

=== 2000 census ===
As of the census of 2000, there were 66,217 people, 24,578 households, and 17,253 families living in the county. The population density was 164 inhabitants per square mile (63/km^{2}). There were 26,298 housing units at an average density of 65 units per square mile (25/km^{2}). The racial makeup of the county was 92.10% White, 5.75% Black or African American, 0.19% Native American, 0.52% Asian, 0.01% Pacific Islander, 0.49% from other races, and 0.95% from two or more races. 1.09% of the population were Hispanic or Latino of any race.

There were 24,578 households, out of which 32.30% had children under the age of 18 living with them, 54.50% were married couples living together, 11.40% had a female householder with no husband present, and 29.80% were non-families. 25.10% of all households were made up of individuals, and 10.90% had someone living alone who was 65 years of age or older. The average household size was 2.50 and the average family size was 2.98.

In the county, the population was spread out, with 24.50% under the age of 18, 8.30% from 18 to 24, 30.30% from 25 to 44, 23.50% from 45 to 64, and 13.40% who were 65 years of age or older. The median age was 37 years. For every 100 females there were 106.90 males. For every 100 females age 18 and over, there were 107.10 males.

The median income for a household in the county was $38,709, and the median income for a family was $45,297. Males had a median income of $33,179 versus $23,586 for females. The per capita income for the county was $18,255. About 7.40% of families and 9.70% of the population were below the poverty line, including 13.60% of those under age 18 and 5.50% of those age 65 or over.

== Politics ==
Prior to 1940, Marion County supported Democrats in presidential elections, only voting for Republican candidates five times from 1856 to 1936. But starting with the 1940 election, the county has become a Republican stronghold in presidential elections with Lyndon B. Johnson being the only Democrat to win since, but Bill Clinton came within just 630 votes of winning it in 1996.

United States presidential election results for Marion County, Ohio
Year	Republican		Democratic		Third party(ies)	
Year	No.	%	No.	%	No.	%
1856	1,367	51.66%	1,275	48.19%	4	0.15%
1860	1,595	49.03%	1,640	50.42%	18	0.55%
1864	1,520	46.91%	1,720	53.09%	0	0.00%
1868	1,548	44.43%	1,936	55.57%	0	0.00%
1872	1,340	41.42%	1,842	56.94%	53	1.64%
1876	1,918	42.23%	2,603	57.31%	21	0.46%
1880	2,192	42.46%	2,932	56.79%	39	0.76%
1884	2,439	43.11%	3,118	55.12%	100	1.77%
1888	2,521	41.38%	3,297	54.12%	274	4.50%
1892	2,477	40.93%	3,282	54.23%	293	4.84%
1896	3,426	45.40%	4,016	53.21%	105	1.39%
1900	3,770	47.03%	4,141	51.66%	105	1.31%
1904	4,473	53.82%	3,581	43.09%	257	3.09%
1908	4,175	46.12%	4,657	51.44%	221	2.44%
1912	3,218	36.04%	4,024	45.07%	1,686	18.88%
1916	4,264	43.29%	5,273	53.53%	313	3.18%
1920	11,320	57.93%	8,065	41.27%	156	0.80%
1924	9,161	54.20%	5,234	30.97%	2,506	14.83%
1928	13,398	70.29%	5,468	28.69%	194	1.02%
1932	8,569	44.10%	10,354	53.29%	506	2.60%
1936	9,070	42.33%	11,881	55.45%	476	2.22%
1940	11,817	53.04%	10,462	46.96%	0	0.00%
1944	11,925	57.61%	8,775	42.39%	0	0.00%
1948	10,333	55.54%	8,223	44.20%	50	0.27%
1952	14,583	62.23%	8,851	37.77%	0	0.00%
1956	15,125	67.07%	7,425	32.93%	0	0.00%
1960	15,210	61.31%	9,598	38.69%	0	0.00%
1964	10,050	41.10%	14,400	58.90%	0	0.00%
1968	12,887	53.10%	8,611	35.48%	2,773	11.43%
1972	17,197	67.02%	7,970	31.06%	492	1.92%
1976	13,141	53.38%	10,962	44.52%	517	2.10%
1980	14,605	56.98%	9,419	36.75%	1,607	6.27%
1984	17,392	65.77%	8,827	33.38%	224	0.85%
1988	14,864	60.13%	9,596	38.82%	258	1.04%
1992	11,675	42.13%	9,444	34.08%	6,596	23.80%
1996	11,112	45.04%	10,482	42.48%	3,080	12.48%
2000	13,617	54.87%	10,370	41.79%	828	3.34%
2004	17,171	58.69%	11,930	40.78%	157	0.54%
2008	15,454	53.12%	12,870	44.24%	768	2.64%
2012	14,265	52.03%	12,504	45.61%	649	2.37%
2016	16,961	64.06%	7,928	29.94%	1,589	6.00%
2020	19,023	68.25%	8,269	29.67%	579	2.08%
2024	19,219	69.96%	7,902	28.77%	349	1.27%

United States Senate election results for Marion County, Ohio1
Year	Republican		Democratic		Third party(ies)	
Year	No.	%	No.	%	No.	%
2024	16,763	62.59%	8,824	32.95%	1,195	4.46%

== Government ==
Marion County is represented by two members of the Ohio House of Representatives, as it is split between the 86th and 87th Ohio House Districts. State Representative Tracy Richardson, elected in 2018, represents the 86th Ohio House district, and Riordan T. McClain, appointed in 2018, serves the 87th Ohio House District.

The entirety of Marion County lies within the 26th Ohio Senate District, currently represented by Bill Reineke, who defeated Democrat Craig Swartz in the 2020 Ohio Senate election.

== Education ==
=== Colleges and universities ===
- Marion Technical College
- Ohio State University, Marion Campus

=== Public school districts ===
Five school districts cover the majority of Marion County:

- Elgin Local Schools
- Marion City School District
- Pleasant Local School District
- Ridgedale Local School District
- River Valley Local School District

Additionally, Buckeye Valley Local School District, Cardington-Lincoln Local Schools, Northmor Local School District, and Upper Sandusky Exempted Village School District cover small areas on the edges of the county.

== Communities ==
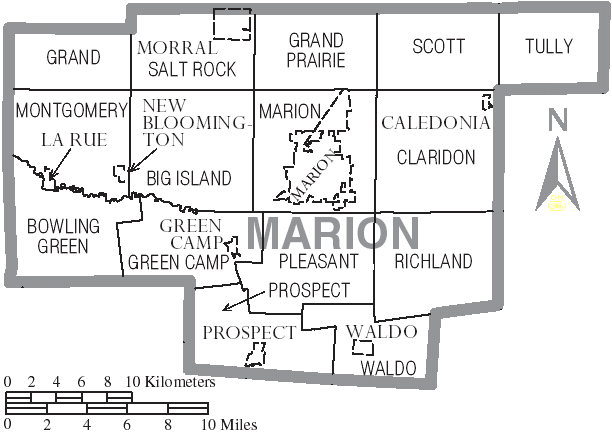
Map of Marion County, Ohio with municipal and township labels

=== City ===
- Marion (county seat)

=== Villages ===
- Caledonia
- Green Camp
- La Rue
- Morral
- New Bloomington
- Prospect
- Waldo

=== Townships ===
- Big Island
- Bowling Green
- Claridon
- Grand
- Grand Prairie
- Green Camp
- Marion
- Montgomery
- Pleasant
- Prospect
- Richland
- Salt Rock
- Scott
- Tully
- Waldo

=== Unincorporated communities ===
- Bellaire Gardens
- Big Island
- Brush Ridge
- Centerville
- Claridon
- DeCliff
- Espyville
- Gast Corner
- Kirkpatrick
- Martel
- Meeker
- Owens
- Tobias

== See also ==
- National Register of Historic Places listings in Marion County, Ohio
