= Montgomery Township, Marion County, Ohio =

Township in Ohio, US

- Township
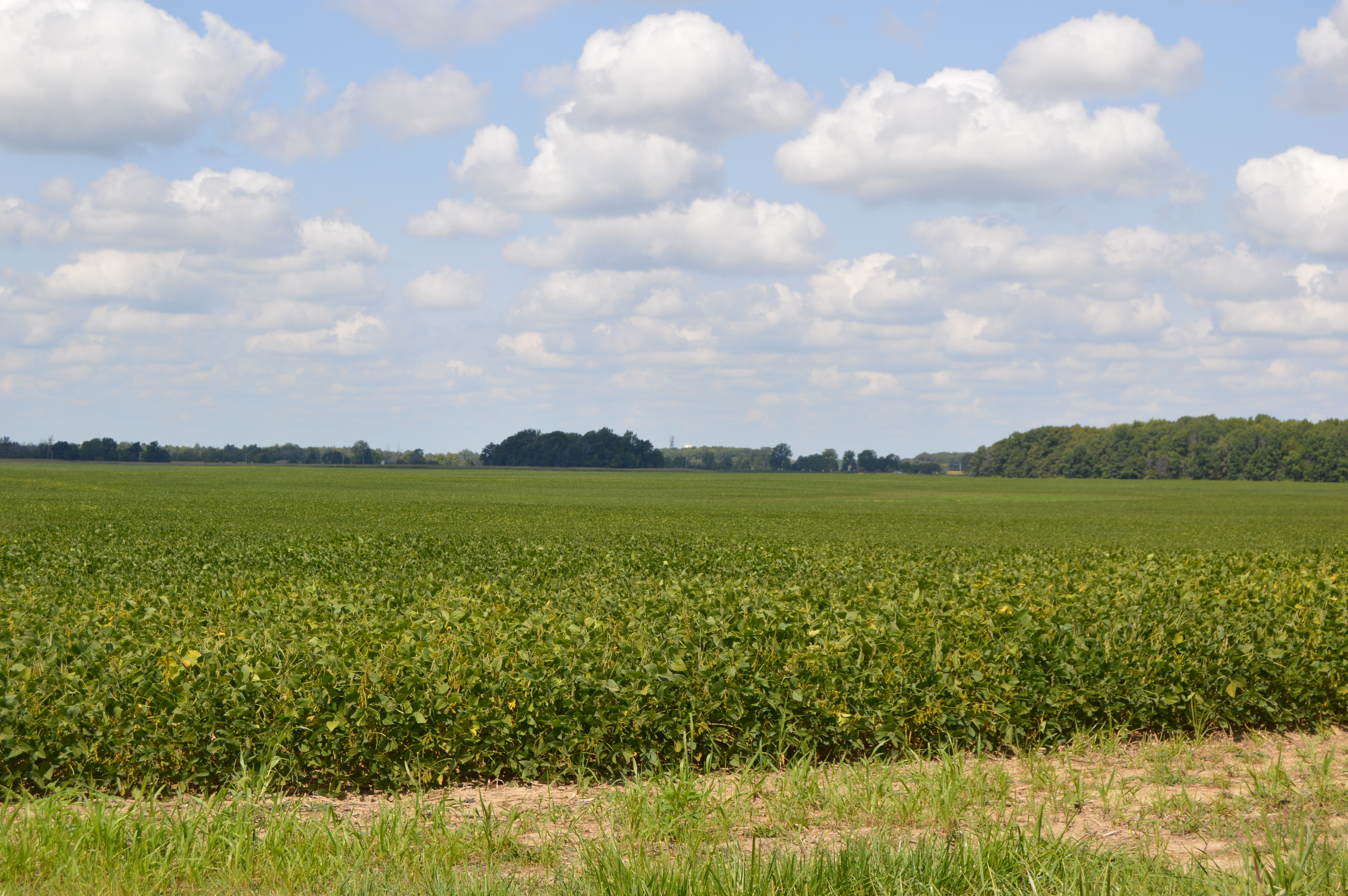
- Fields northwest of New Bloomington

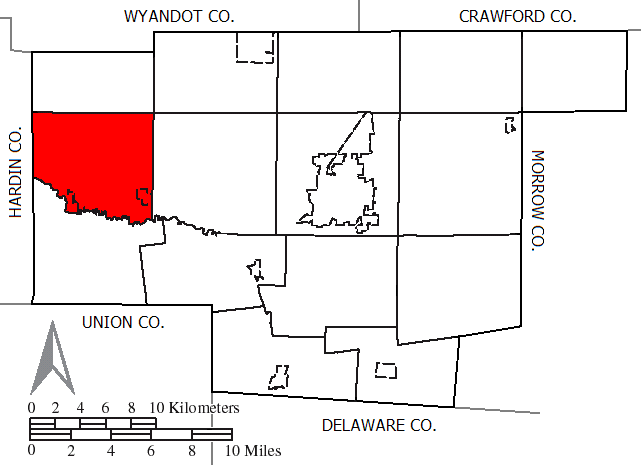
- Location of Montgomery Township in Marion County
- Coordinates: 40°35′52″N 83°21′6″W
- Country: United States
- State: Ohio
- County: Marion

Area
  - Total: 28.4 sq mi (73.6 km^{2})
  - Land: 28.4 sq mi (73.6 km^{2})
  - Water: 0 sq mi (0.0 km^{2})
- Elevation: 909 ft (277 m)

Population (2020)
  - Total: 2,064
  - Density: 72.6/sq mi (28.0/km^{2})
- Time zone: UTC-5 (Eastern (EST))
  - Summer (DST): UTC-4 (EDT)
- FIPS code: 39-51730
- GNIS feature ID: 1086581

Montgomery Township is one of the fifteen townships of Marion County, Ohio, United States. The 2020 census found 2,064 people in the township; 676 lived in the village of LaRue and 413 lived in the village of New Bloomington.

== Geography ==
Located in the western part of the county, it borders the following townships:

- Grand Township - north
- Salt Rock Township - northeast corner
- Big Island Township - east
- Bowling Green Township - south
- Dudley Township, Hardin County - west
- Goshen Township, Hardin County - northwest corner

Two villages are located in Montgomery Township: LaRue in the southwest, and New Bloomington in the southeast.

== Name and history ==
Statewide, other Montgomery Townships are located in Ashland and Wood counties.

== Government ==
The township is governed by a three-member board of trustees, who are elected in November of odd-numbered years to a four-year term beginning on the following January 1. Two are elected in the year after the presidential election and one is elected in the year before it. There is also an elected township fiscal officer, who serves a four-year term beginning on April 1 of the year after the election, which is held in November of the year before the presidential election. Vacancies in the fiscal officership or on the board of trustees are filled by the remaining trustees.
