= Claridon, Marion County, Ohio =

Claridon, Ohio
- Unincorporated community
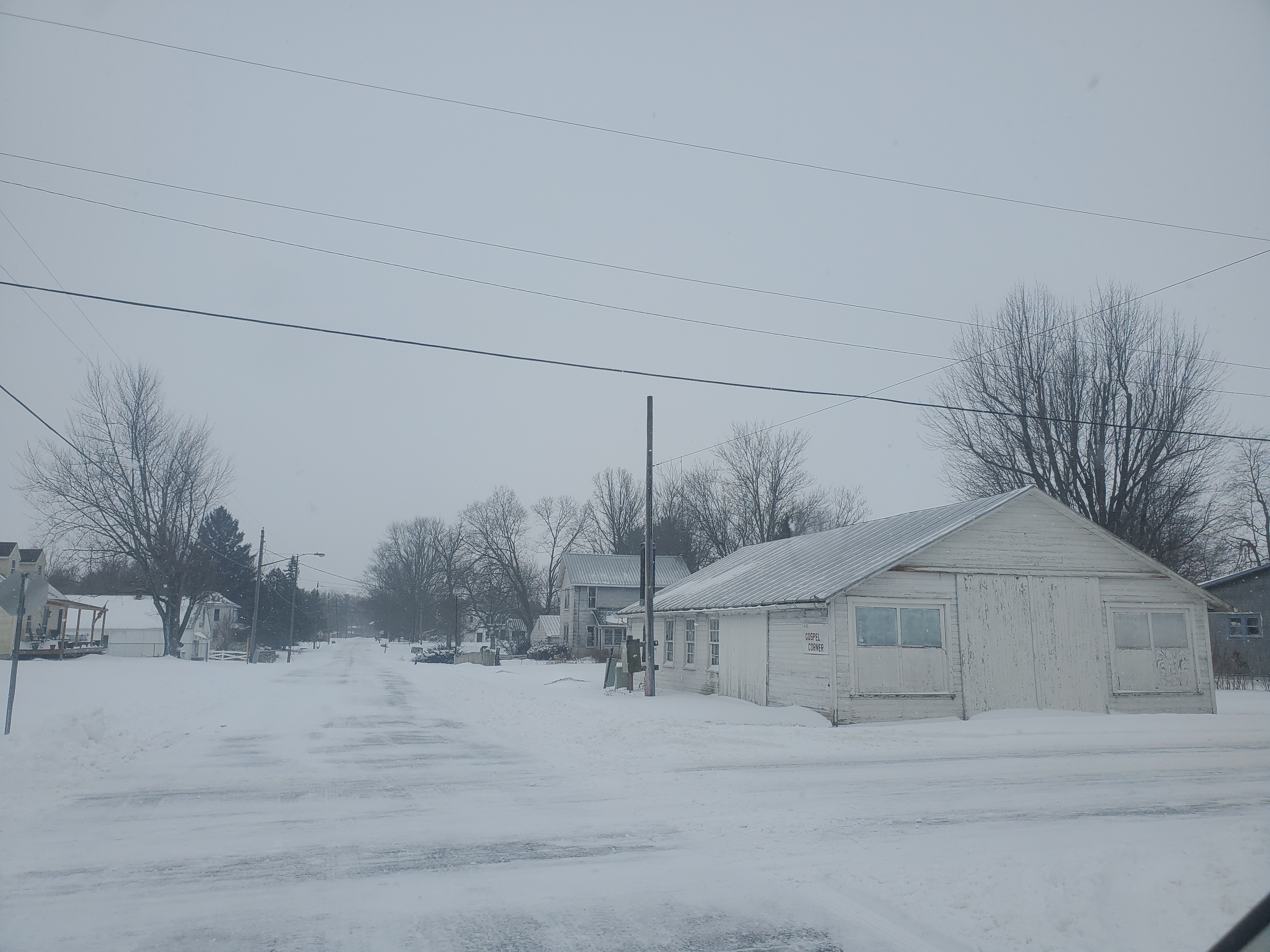
- In 2022

- Location within Ohio Location within the United States
- Coordinates: 40°34′59″N 82°59′54″W
- Country: United States
- State: Ohio
- County: Marion
- Township: Claridon
- Elevation: 984 ft (300 m)
- Time zone: UTC-5 (Eastern (EST))
  - Summer (DST): UTC-4 (EDT)
- ZIP Code: 43314 (Caledonia)
- Area code: 419
- GNIS feature ID: 1056804

Claridon is an unincorporated community in Marion County, Ohio, United States. Claridon is located on Ohio State Route 95, 7 miles (11 km) east of Marion, between Marion and Mt. Gilead. The community is served by River Valley Local School District.

== History ==
Claridon was laid out in 1821. The young community was once a contender for the county seat. A post office called Claridon was established in 1822, and remained in operation until about 1831. Some confusion exists about the date of the establishment of the post office because there existed a Claridon in Geagua County (which opened its post office in 1819, a year before Marion County was even opened to settlement). The first postmaster was Bisby Kilbourn(e). Besides the post office, Claridon had a tavern and a country store.
