= Hepburn, Ohio =

Unincorporated community in Ohio, U.S.

Coordinates: 40°37′17″N 83°28′11″W

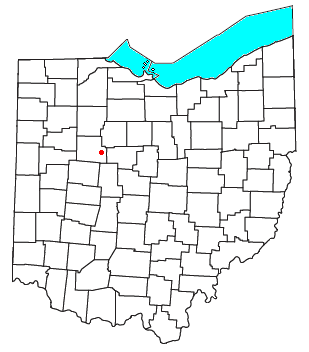
Location of Hepburn, Ohio

Hepburn is an unincorporated community in northern Dudley Township, Hardin County, Ohio, United States. It lies at the intersection of County Roads 144 and 227, 7 1/2 miles (12.1 km) east of the center of the city of Kenton, the county seat of Hardin County. Along the south side of the community runs the Scioto River. The community is served by the Kenton (43326) post office.

== History ==
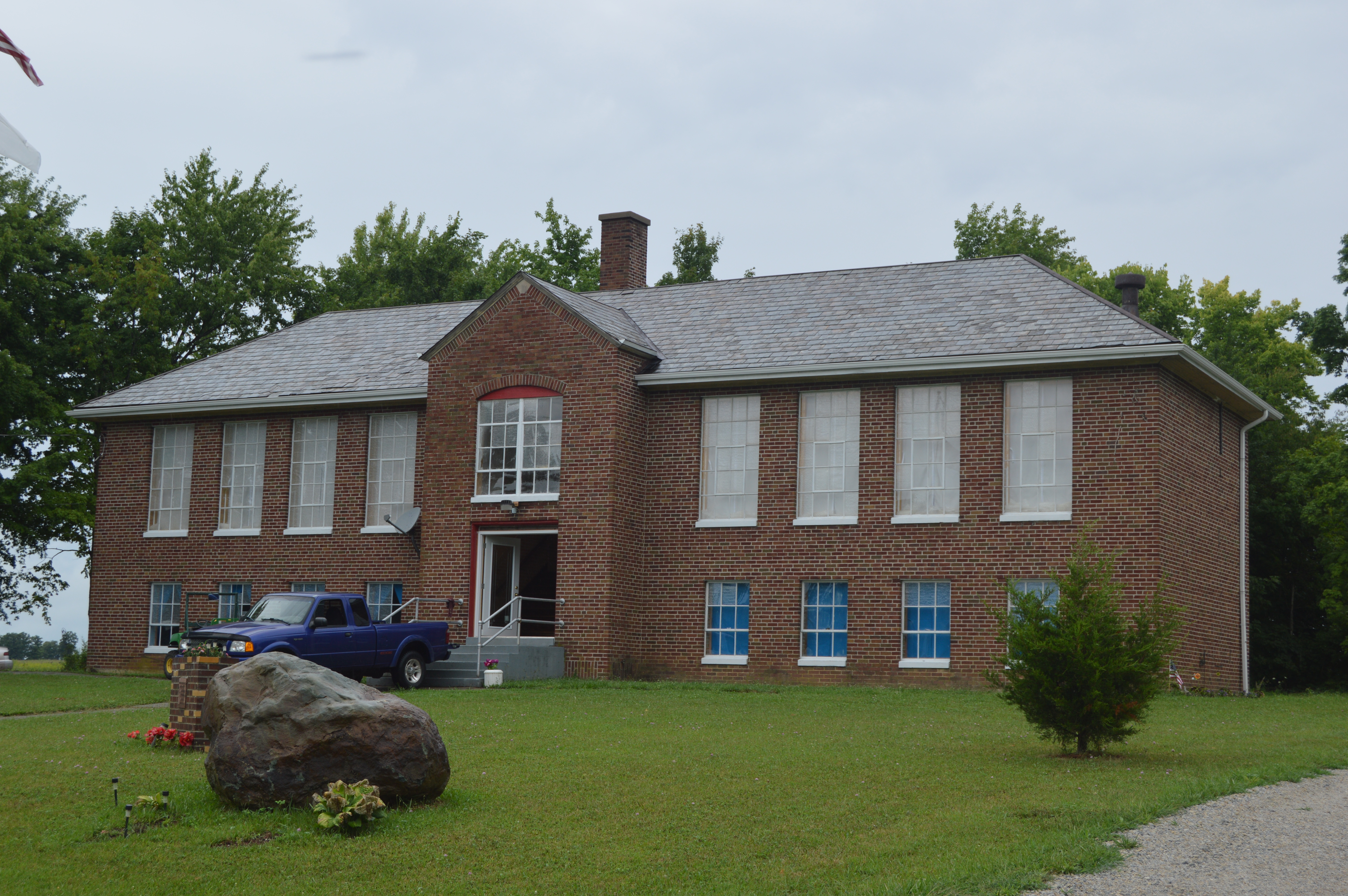
Former community school

Hepburn was laid out in 1882. A post office was established at Hepburn in 1884, and remained in operation until 1948.
