= Big Island Township, Ohio =

Township in Ohio, US

- Township
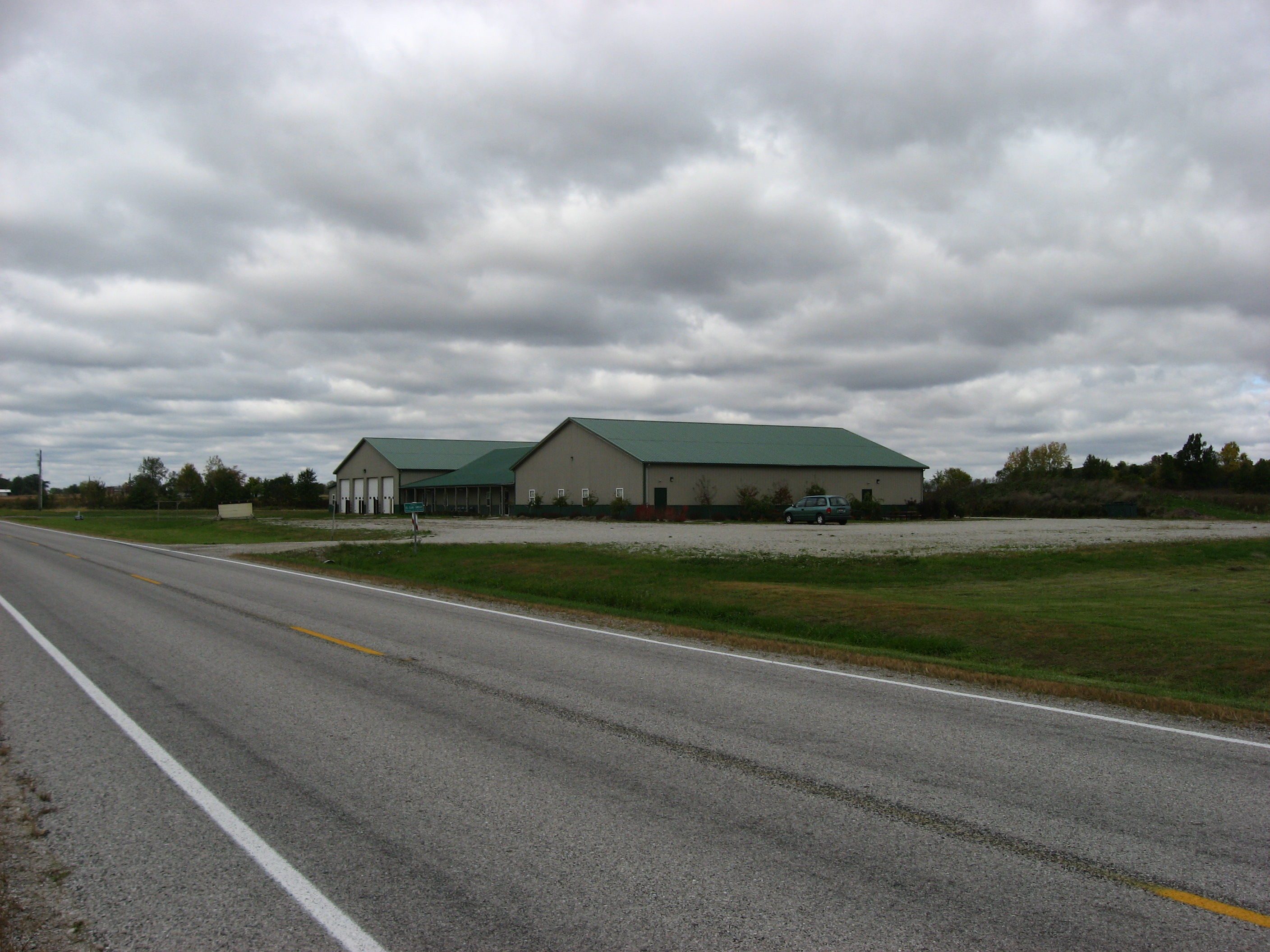
- Big Island Township hall

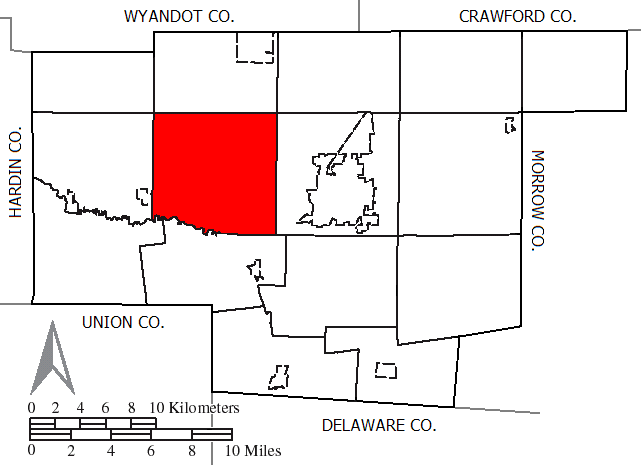
- Location of Big Island Township in Marion County
- Coordinates: 40°36′30″N 83°14′16″W
- Country: United States
- State: Ohio
- County: Marion

Area
  - Total: 35.3 sq mi (91.4 km^{2})
  - Land: 35.3 sq mi (91.3 km^{2})
  - Water: 0 sq mi (0.0 km^{2})
- Elevation: 909 ft (277 m)

Population (2020)
  - Total: 1,174
  - Density: 33.3/sq mi (12.9/km^{2})
- Time zone: UTC-5 (Eastern (EST))
  - Summer (DST): UTC-4 (EDT)
- FIPS code: 39-06348
- GNIS feature ID: 1086574

Big Island Township is one of the fifteen townships of Marion County, Ohio, United States. The 2020 census found 1,174 people in the township.

== Geography ==
Located in the western part of the county, it borders the following townships:

- Salt Rock Township - north
- Grand Prairie Township - northeast corner
- Marion Township - east
- Green Camp Township - south
- Bowling Green Township - southwest
- Montgomery Township - west
- Grand Township - northwest corner

No municipalities are located in Big Island Township.

== Name and history ==
Big Island Township was established in 1823, and named for a tract of forest early settlers believed must have been located on an island. It is the only Big Island Township statewide.

== Government ==
The township is governed by a three-member board of trustees, who are elected in November of odd-numbered years to a four-year term beginning on the following January 1. Two are elected in the year after the presidential election and one is elected in the year before it. There is also an elected township fiscal officer, who serves a four-year term beginning on April 1 of the year after the election, which is held in November of the year before the presidential election. Vacancies in the fiscal officership or on the board of trustees are filled by the remaining trustees.
