= New Bloomington, Ohio =

- Village
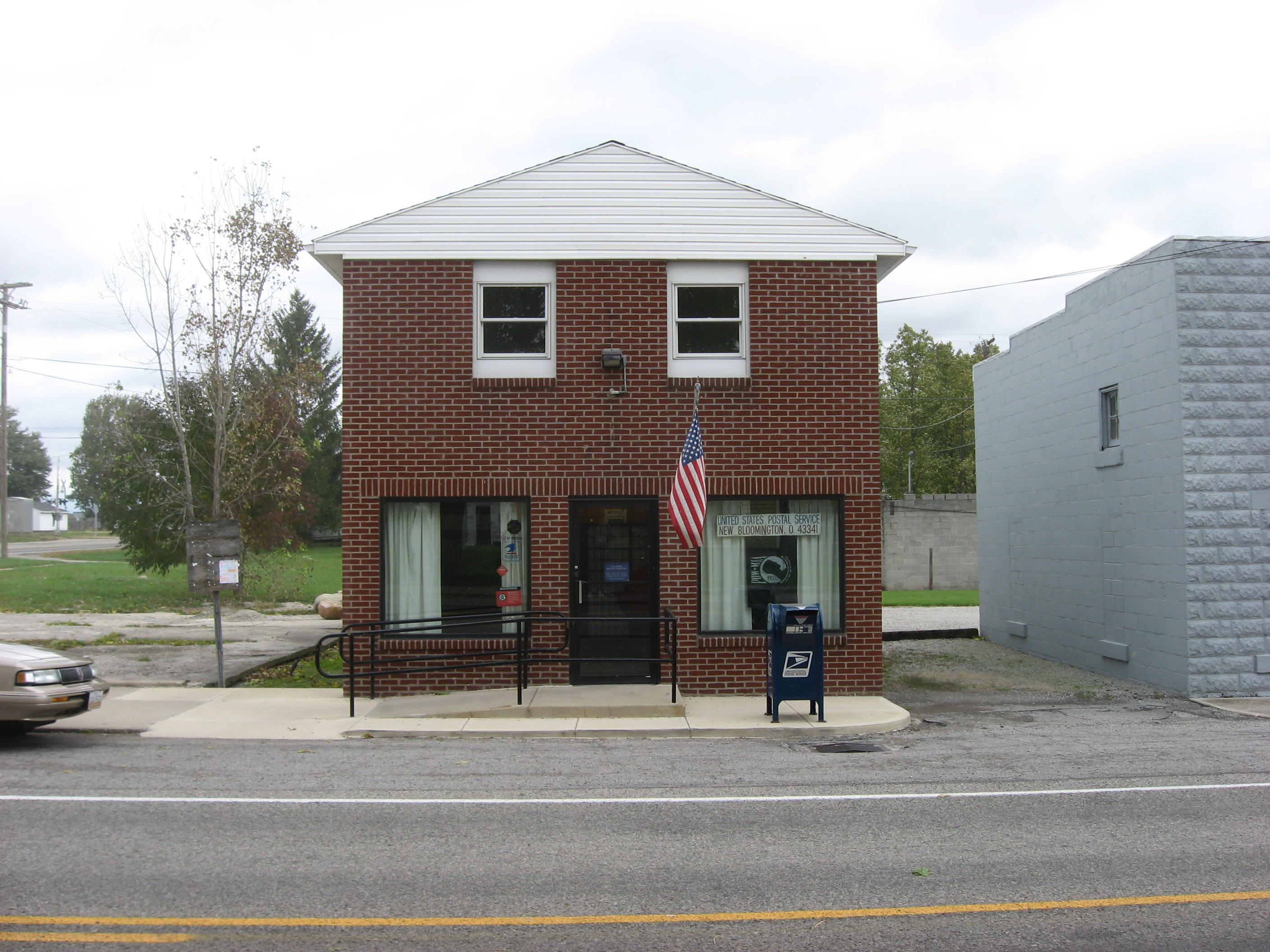
- New Bloomington's post office

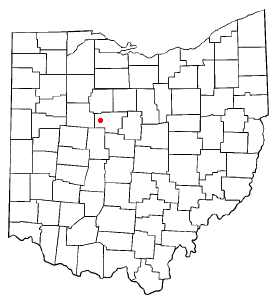
- Location of New Bloomington, Ohio

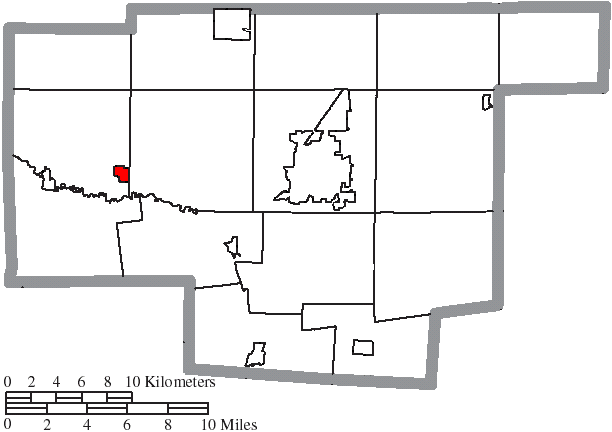
- Location of New Bloomington in Marion County
- Coordinates: 40°35′01″N 83°18′45″W
- Country: United States
- State: Ohio
- County: Marion
- Township: Montgomery

Government
  - Mayor: Melinda Mosley

Area
  - Total: 0.44 sq mi (1.14 km^{2})
  - Land: 0.44 sq mi (1.14 km^{2})
  - Water: 0 sq mi (0.00 km^{2})
- Elevation: 932 ft (284 m)

Population (2020)
  - Total: 413
  - Density: 937.9/sq mi (362.14/km^{2})
- Time zone: UTC-5 (Eastern (EST))
  - Summer (DST): UTC-4 (EDT)
- ZIP code: 43341
- Area code: 740
- FIPS code: 39-54152
- GNIS feature ID: 2399457
- Website: https://newbloomington.com/

New Bloomington is a village in Marion County, Ohio, United States. The population was 413 at the 2020 census. New Bloomington is served by Elgin Local School District.

New Bloomington was originally named Carey Station, and under the latter name was laid out in 1856.

== Geography ==
According to the United States Census Bureau, the village has a total area of 0.44 square miles (1.14 km^{2}), all land.

== Demographics ==
Historical population
Census	Pop.	Note	%±
1880	271		—
1900	399		—
1910	304		−23.8%
1920	240		−21.1%
1930	187		−22.1%
1940	187		0.0%
1950	188		0.5%
1960	368		95.7%
1970	343		−6.8%
1980	303		−11.7%
1990	282		−6.9%
2000	548		94.3%
2010	515		−6.0%
2020	413		−19.8%
U.S. Decennial Census

=== 2010 census ===
As of the census of 2010, there were 515 people, 191 households, and 140 families residing in the village. The population density was 1,170.5 inhabitants per square mile (451.9/km^{2}). There were 214 housing units at an average density of 486.4 per square mile (187.8/km^{2}). The racial makeup of the village was 93.6% White, 0.4% African American, 0.2% Native American, 0.2% Asian, 2.5% from other races, and 3.1% from two or more races. Hispanic or Latino of any race were 14.4% of the population.

There were 191 households, of which 39.8% had children under the age of 18 living with them, 50.3% were married couples living together, 14.1% had a female householder with no husband present, 8.9% had a male householder with no wife present, and 26.7% were non-families. 19.4% of all households were made up of individuals, and 6.3% had someone living alone who was 65 years of age or older. The average household size was 2.70 and the average family size was 3.08.

The median age in the village was 35.2 years. 25.2% of residents were under the age of 18; 9.7% were between the ages of 18 and 24; 27.7% were from 25 to 44; 27.4% were from 45 to 64; and 9.9% were 65 years of age or older. The gender makeup of the village was 55.1% male and 44.9% female.

=== 2000 census ===
As of the census of 2000, there were 548 people, 190 households, and 147 families residing in the village. The population density was 1,246.9 inhabitants per square mile (481.4/km^{2}). There were 223 housing units at an average density of 507.4 per square mile (195.9/km^{2}). The racial makeup of the village was 97.26% White, 0.18% African American, 1.09% Native American, 0.18% from other races, and 1.28% from two or more races. Hispanic or Latino of any race were 2.74% of the population.

There were 190 households, out of which 45.3% had children under the age of 18 living with them, 57.4% were married couples living together, 14.7% had a female householder with no husband present, and 22.6% were non-families. 18.4% of all households were made up of individuals, and 5.3% had someone living alone who was 65 years of age or older. The average household size was 2.88 and the average family size was 3.27.

In the village, the population was spread out, with 33.4% under the age of 18, 7.1% from 18 to 24, 35.0% from 25 to 44, 17.7% from 45 to 64, and 6.8% who were 65 years of age or older. The median age was 31 years. For every 100 females there were 95.7 males. For every 100 females age 18 and over, there were 88.1 males.

The median income for a household in the village was $34,150, and the median income for a family was $34,875. Males had a median income of $32,857 versus $21,500 for females. The per capita income for the village was $13,707. About 9.8% of families and 11.7% of the population were below the poverty line, including 12.6% of those under age 18 and 7.4% of those age 65 or over.
