= South Woodbury =

South Woodbury may refer to:

- South Woodbury, Ohio
- South Woodbury Township, Pennsylvania
