= Ohio State Route 314 =

State highway in northern Ohio, US

State Route 314

Route information
- Maintained by ODOT
- Length: 38.77 mi (62.39 km)
- Existed: 1932–present

Major junctions
- South end: US 36 / SR 3 in Centerburg
- US 42 near Lexington
- North end: SR 61 near Shelby

Location
- Country: United States
- State: Ohio
- Counties: Knox, Morrow, Richland

Highway system
- Ohio State Highway System; Interstate; US; State; Scenic
← SR 313	→ SR 315

State Route 314 (SR 314) is a north–south state highway in the northern portion of the U.S. state of Ohio. The southern terminus of SR 314 is at a T-intersection with the duplex of U.S. Route 36 (US 36) and SR 3 in Centerburg. Its northern terminus is at a T-intersection with State Route 61 less than 1 mile (1.6 km) south of the city limits of Shelby.

== Route description ==
SR 314 travels through southwestern Knox County, eastern Morrow County and western Richland County. There are no stretches of this highway that are incorporated within the National Highway System, a network of routes identified as being most important for the economy, mobility and defense of the country.

== History ==
The SR 314 designation made its debut in 1932. It was originally routed entirely within Morrow County, along its present alignment between the SR 95 junction in Chesterville and the US 42 intersection southwest of Lexington.

In 1935, SR 314 was extended on the south end. It was routed along previously un-numbered roadways to a new endpoint at its present southern terminus at the US 36/SR 3 duplex in Centerburg. Then, in 1939, SR 314 was lengthened on the north end when it was extended along roads that were previously locally maintained to its current northern terminus at SR 61 south of Shelby.

== Major intersections ==
County	Location	mi	km	Destinations	Notes
Knox	Centerburg	0.00	0.00	US 36 / SR 3 – Mount Vernon, Sunbury	
Morrow	Sparta	6.25	10.06	SR 656 (Main Street)	
Morrow	South Bloomfield Township	6.58	10.59	SR 229 east – Mount Vernon	Southern end of SR 229 concurrency
Morrow	South Bloomfield Township	6.75	10.86	SR 229 west to I-71 south – Marengo	Northern end of SR 229 concurrency
Morrow	Chesterville	12.68	20.41	SR 95 (Sandusky Street) to I-71	
Morrow	Perry Township	22.75	36.61	US 42 – Mount Gilead, Mansfield	
Morrow	Troy Township	28.42	45.74	SR 97 – Galion, Lexington	
Richland	Ontario	32.52	52.34	SR 309 – Galion, Mansfield	
Richland	Sharon Township	38.77	62.39	SR 61 – Shelby, Crestline	
1.000 mi = 1.609 km; 1.000 km = 0.621 mi: Concurrency terminus
