= Moshers Mill, Ohio =

Coordinates: 40.517152°N 82.866701°W

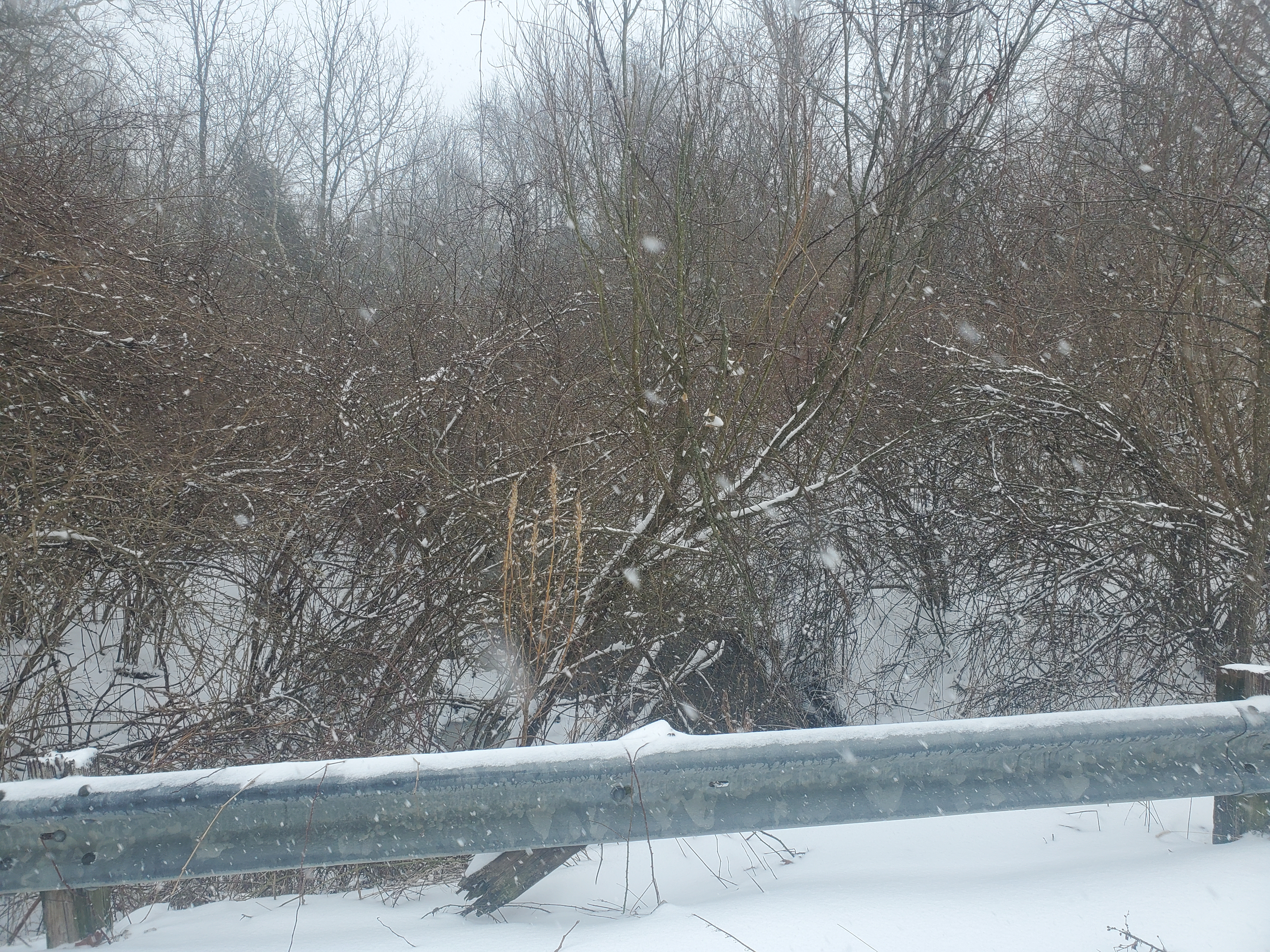
Site in 2022

Moshers Mill is a ghost town in Gilead Township, Morrow County, in the U.S. state of Ohio.

== History ==
Mosher's Mill, the first gristmill and sawmill in the area, was built by Asa Mosher in 1819.
