= Candlewood Lake, Ohio =

Census-designated place in Ohio, United States

- Census-designated place
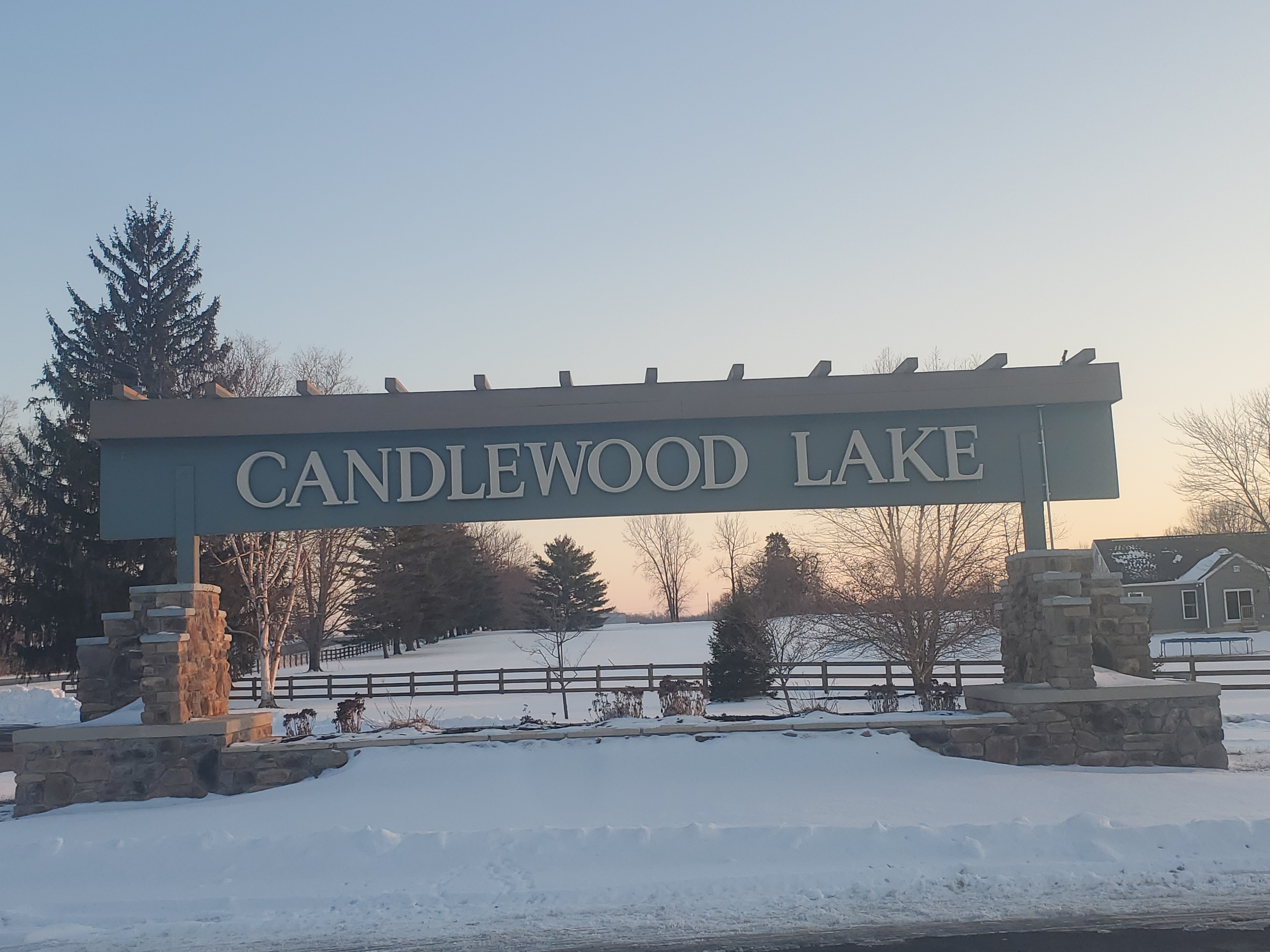
- Candlewood Lake entry sign
- Interactive map of Candlewood Lake, Ohio
- Coordinates: 40°37′30″N 82°46′33″W
- Country: United States
- State: Ohio
- County: Morrow
- Township: Congress

Area
  - Total: 2.56 sq mi (6.6 km^{2})
  - Land: 2.31 sq mi (6.0 km^{2})
  - Water: 0.25 sq mi (0.65 km^{2})
- Elevation: 1,240 ft (380 m)

Population (2020)
  - Total: 1,329
  - Density: 575.6/sq mi (222.2/km^{2})
- Time zone: UTC-5 (Eastern (EST))
  - Summer (DST): UTC-4 (EDT)
- ZIP Code: 43338 (Mount Gilead)
- FIPS code: 39-11334
- GNIS feature ID: 2628872
- Website: candlewoodlake.us

Candlewood Lake is a census-designated place in Morrow County, in the U.S. state of Ohio. The population was 1,329 at the 2020 census, up from 1,147 in 2010.

== History ==
Historical population
Census	Pop.	Note	%±
2010	1,147		—
2020	1,329		15.9%

Candlewood Lake had its start in the 1970s as a planned community. It was first listed as a census-designated place in 2010.

== Geography ==
Candlewood Lake is in northern Morrow County, in the northwestern part of Congress Township. It surrounds a lake of the same name, a reservoir built on Whetstone Creek. The northern border of the community is the North Bloomfield Township line. Ohio State Route 19 forms the eastern border of the community; the highway leads southeast 4 miles (6 km) to U.S. Route 42 at Williamsport and north 9 miles (14 km) to Galion.

According to the U.S. Census Bureau, the Candlewood Lake CDP has an area of 2.56 square miles (6.63 km^{2}), of which 2.31 square miles (5.98 km^{2}) are land and 0.25 square miles (0.65 km^{2}), or 9.91%, are water. The lake is built on Whetstone Creek near its headwaters; the creek flows out of Candlewood Lake to the west, then leads southwest to Mount Gilead, the Morrow county seat, and eventually the Olentangy River in Delaware County.

== Government ==
The governance of Candlewood Lake consists of a nine-member board of trustees. One-third of these seats are up for reelection each year.
