= Florida Grove, Ohio =

Coordinates: 40.550729°N 82.776623°W

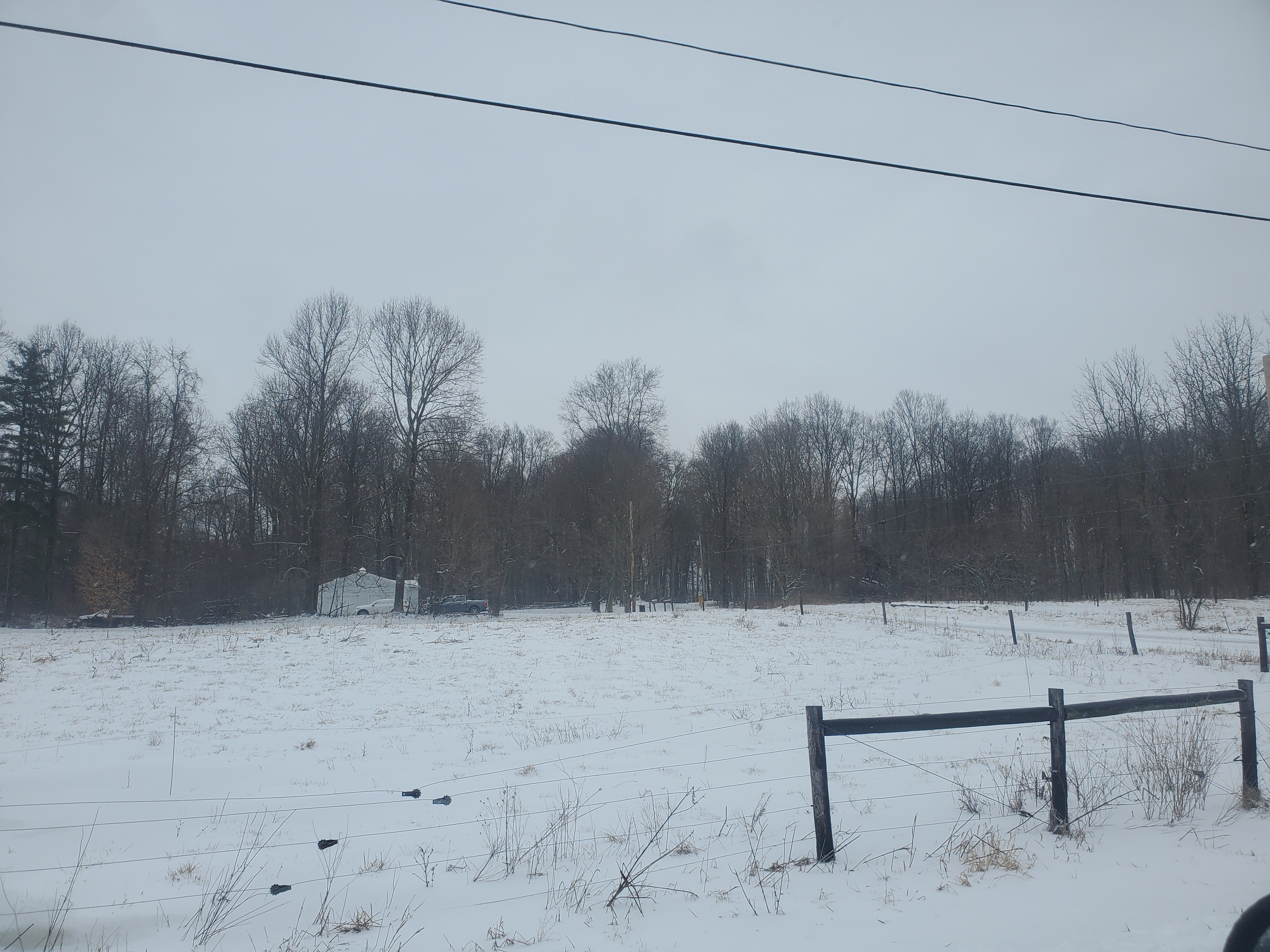
Site of Florida Grove, Ohio

Florida Grove is a ghost town in Morrow County, in the U.S. state of Ohio.

== History ==
Florida Grove was founded before 1823. By the 1880s, the town site had reverted to farmland.
