= Johnsville, Ohio =

Unincorporated community in Ohio, U.S.

Johnsville, Ohio Shauck
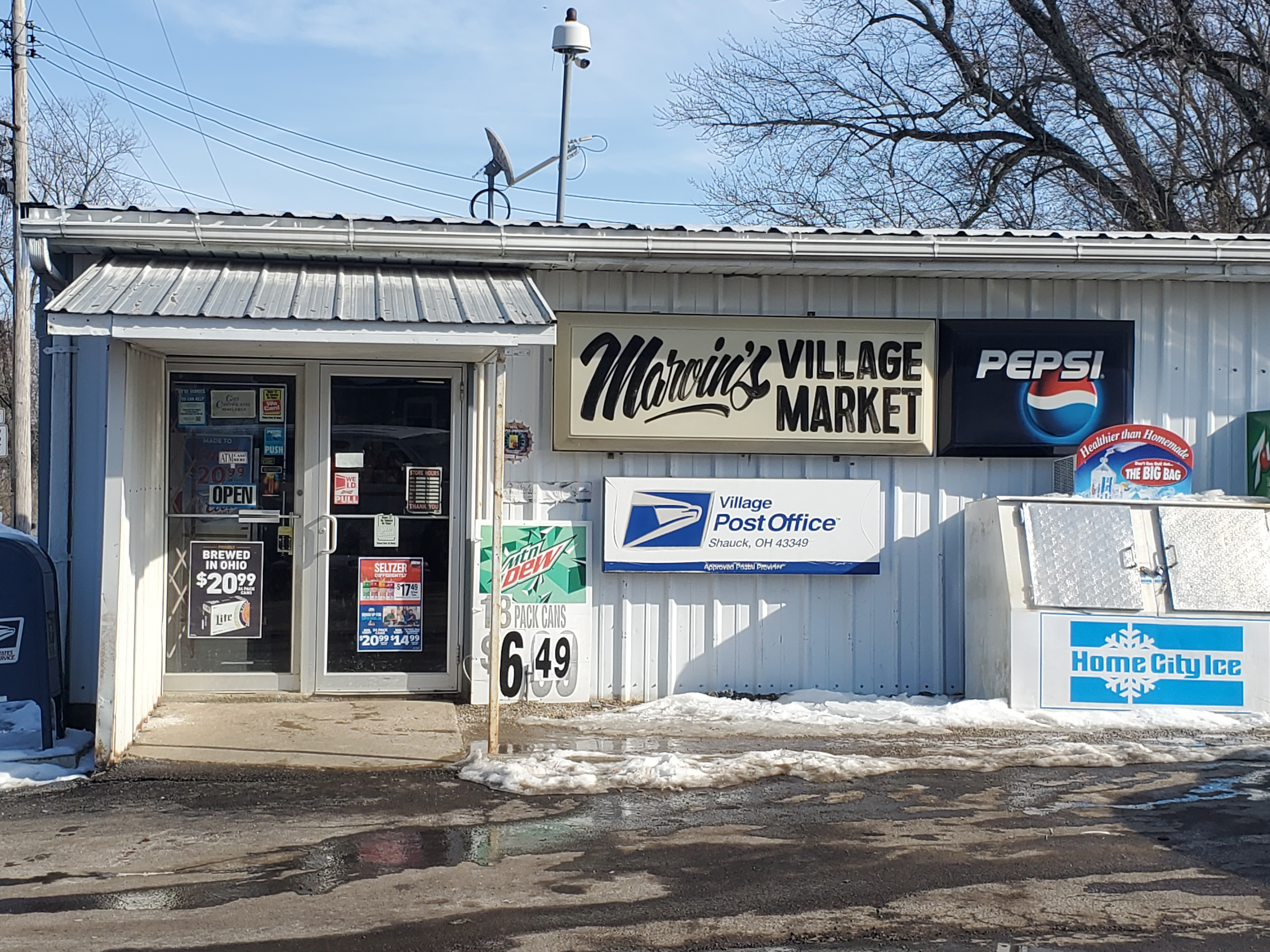
- Shauck Post Office and Marvin's Village Market

- Location within Ohio Location within the United States
- Coordinates: 40°37′15″N 82°39′43″W
- Country: United States
- State: Ohio
- County: Morrow
- Township: Perry
- Elevation: 1,345 ft (410 m)
- Postal code: 43349 (Shauck)
- GNIS feature ID: 1061200

Johnsville, also known as Shauck, is an unincorporated community in northern Perry Township, Morrow County, Ohio, United States. It is served by the Shauck post office, with the ZIP code 43349. It is located at the intersection of U.S. Route 42 with State Route 314.

== History ==
Johnsville was laid out in 1834 and named for John Ely, proprietor. The post office in Johnsville is called Shauck. This post office was established in 1824.
