= Vails =

Vails is a surname. Notable people with the surname include:

- Donald Vails (1948–1997), American songwriter
- Nelson Vails (born 1960), American cyclist

== See also ==
- Vails Corners, Ohio
- Vails Gate, New York
