= Gilead Township =

Gilead Township may refer to the following places in the United States:

- Gilead Township, Michigan
- Gilead Township, Morrow County, Ohio
