= North Woodbury =

North Woodbury may refer to:

- North Woodbury, Ohio
- North Woodbury Township, Blair County, Pennsylvania
