= Canaan Township, Ohio =

Canaan Township, Ohio, may refer to:

- Canaan Township, Athens County, Ohio
- Canaan Township, Madison County, Ohio
- Canaan Township, Morrow County, Ohio
- Canaan Township, Wayne County, Ohio
