= Pulaskiville, Ohio =

Unincorporated community in Ohio, U.S.

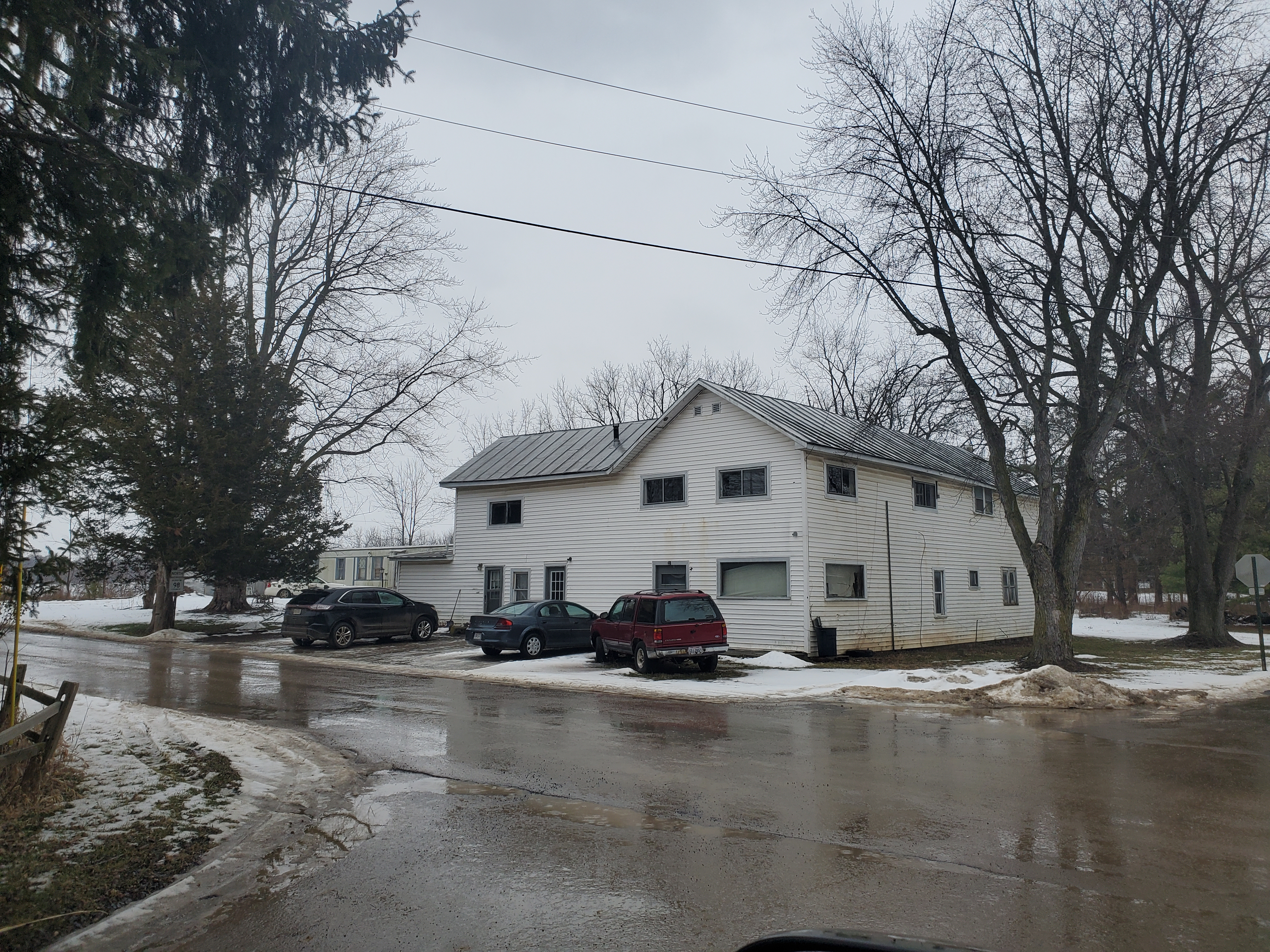
- Scene in Pulaskiville

- Location within Ohio Location within the United States
- Coordinates: 40°32′02″N 82°42′37″W
- Country: United States
- State: Ohio
- County: Morrow
- Township: Franklin
- Established: 1834
- ZIP Code: 43338 (Mount Gilead)

Pulaskiville is an unincorporated community in Morrow County, in the U.S. state of Ohio.

== History ==
Pulaskiville was laid out in 1834. A post office was established at Pulaskiville in 1838, and remained in operation until 1907. In the 1910s, Pulaskiville had two churches and a country store.
