= New Enterprise =

New Enterprise may refer to:

== Places ==
- New Enterprise, a populated place in northern Bedford County, Pennsylvania
- New Enterprise Public School, in South Woodbury Township, Bedford County, Pennsylvania

== Other ==
- New Enterprise Associates, a venture capital firm focused on information technology and healthcare
- New Enterprise Coaches, the coaching arm of Arriva Southern Counties, based in Kent, England
- New Enterprise Stone & Lime Co., Inc., a company owning and operating quarries in Pennsylvania, New York, and Delaware
