= Climax, Ohio =

Unincorporated community in Ohio, U.S.

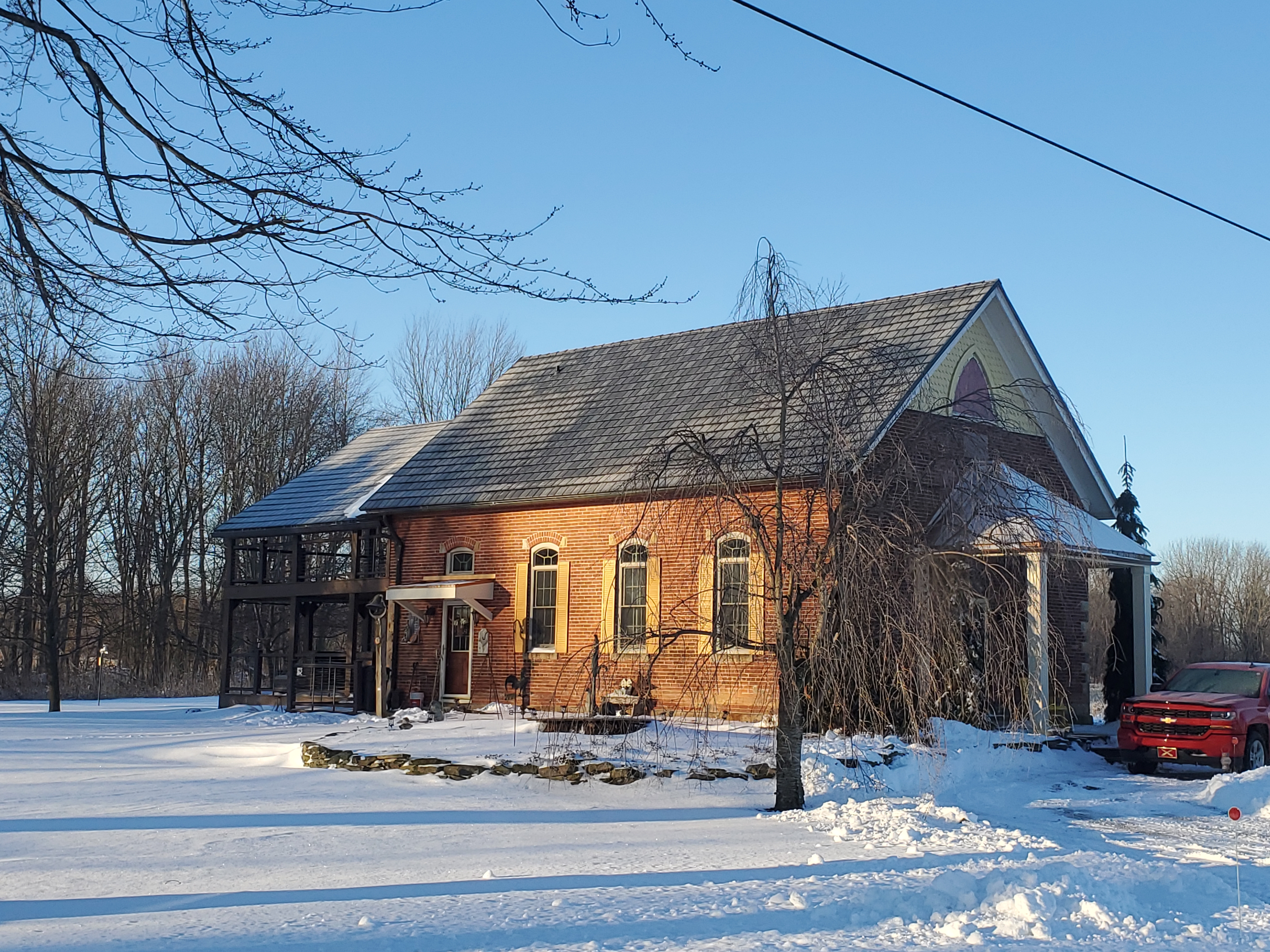
- Building in Climax

- Location within Ohio Location within the United States
- Coordinates: 40°37′50″N 82°53′17″W
- Country: United States
- State: Ohio
- County: Morrow
- Township: Canaan
- ZIP Code: 43320 (Edison)

Climax is an unincorporated community in Morrow County, in the U.S. state of Ohio.

== History ==
A post office called Climax was established in 1881, and remained in operation until 1929. Besides the post office, Climax once contained a church, country store, and town hall.
