= Pagetown, Ohio =

Unincorporated community in Ohio, U.S.

Coordinates: 40°21′26″N 82°49′06″W

Pagetown is an unincorporated community in Morrow County, in the U.S. state of Ohio.

== History ==
Pagetown was laid out in 1837 by Marcus Page who emigrated from Broome County New York in 1817 with his family. Marcus sold the land to his brother William Page in 1819. A post office called Pagetown after the principle family in the community, was established in 1866, and remained in operation until 1903. Pagetown was never a thriving community and reached its zenith between 1830 and 1900. At its peak it contained a small hotel, tannery, carding mill for wool, and iron foundry, blacksmith shop, general store tavern and school. The only church, Methodist, was built in 1866. Its two most notable figures were Daniel Leonard Page b. 12/16/1842, a Civil War commander in the Union army, and later one of the founders of Joplin, MO. and Myrtle Page Fillmore (née Mary Caroline Page) b. 8/06/1845 and co-founder of Unity School of Christianity.
