= Congress Township, Morrow County, Ohio =

Township in Ohio, US

- Township
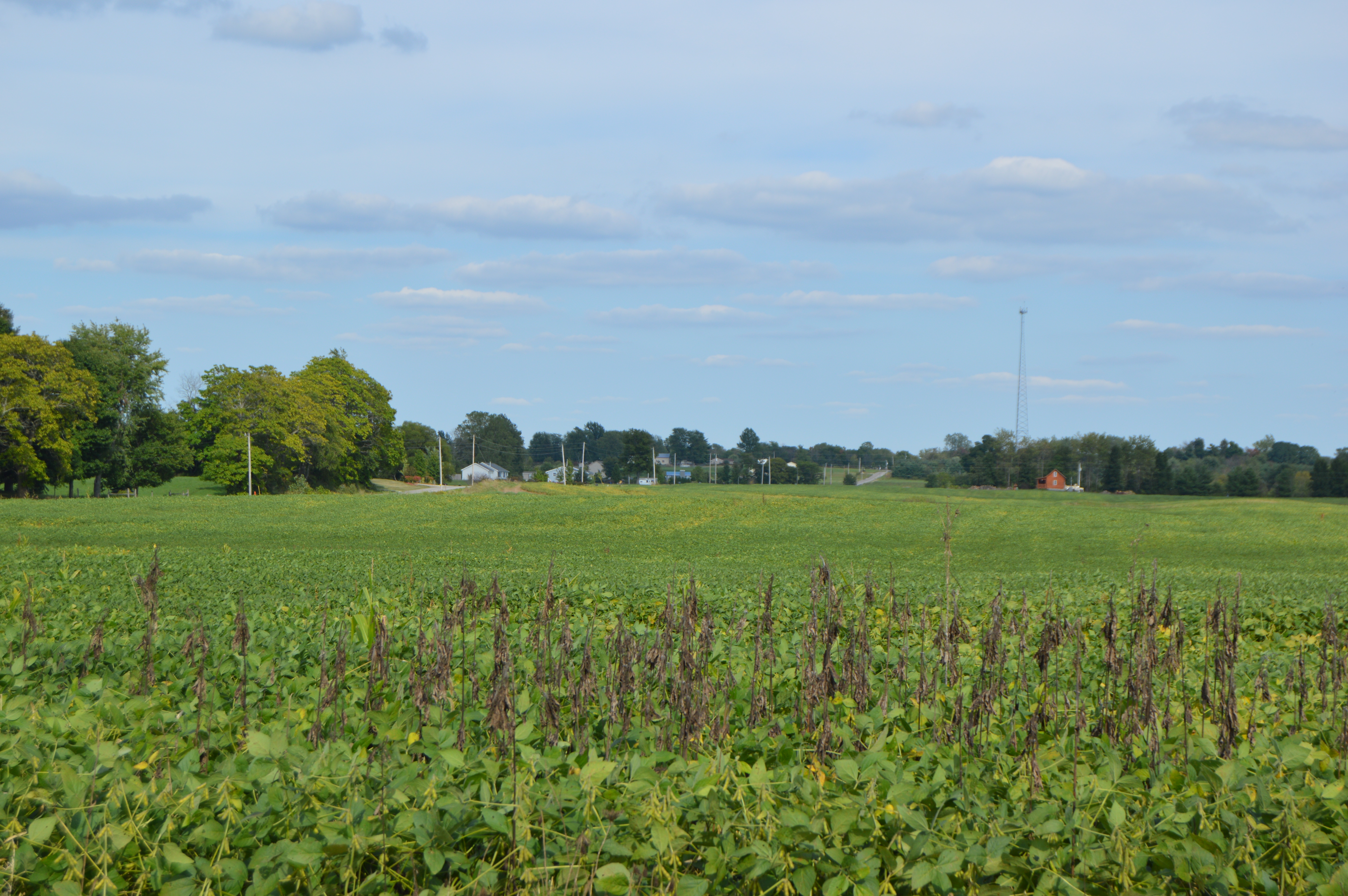
- Countryside southwest of West Point

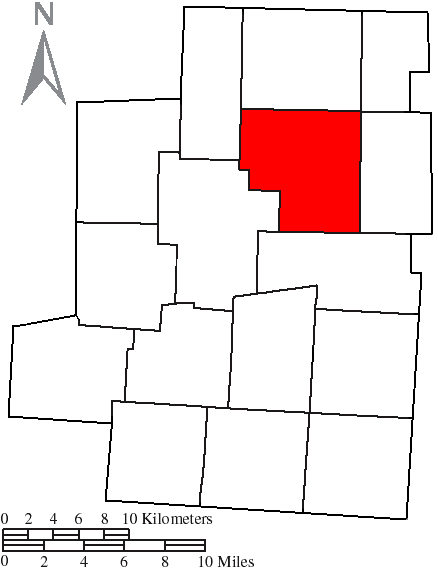
- Location of Congress Township in Morrow County
- Coordinates: 40°36′17″N 82°45′1″W
- Country: United States
- State: Ohio
- County: Morrow

Area
  - Total: 31.7 sq mi (82.0 km^{2})
  - Land: 31.4 sq mi (81.2 km^{2})
  - Water: 0.31 sq mi (0.8 km^{2})
- Elevation: 1,388 ft (423 m)

Population (2020)
  - Total: 2,939
  - Density: 93.7/sq mi (36.2/km^{2})
- Time zone: UTC-5 (Eastern (EST))
  - Summer (DST): UTC-4 (EDT)
- FIPS code: 39-18294
- GNIS feature ID: 1086701
- Website: https://www.congresstownship-morrowco.org/

Congress Township is one of the sixteen townships of Morrow County, Ohio, United States. The 2020 census found 2,939 people in the township.

== Geography ==
Located in the northern part of the county, it borders the following townships:

- North Bloomfield Township - north
- Troy Township - northeast corner
- Perry Township - east
- Franklin Township - south
- Gilead Township - southwest
- Washington Township - northwest

No municipalities are located in Congress Township, although the census-designated place of Candlewood Lake is located in the township's northwest.

== Name and history ==
Statewide, the only other Congress Township is located in Wayne County.

== Government ==
The township is governed by a three-member board of trustees, who are elected in November of odd-numbered years to a four-year term beginning on the following January 1. Two are elected in the year after the presidential election and one is elected in the year before it. There is also an elected township fiscal officer, who serves a four-year term beginning on April 1 of the year after the election, which is held in November of the year before the presidential election. Vacancies in the fiscal officership or on the board of trustees are filled by the remaining trustees.
