= Blooming Grove, Ohio =

Unincorporated community in Morrow County, Ohio

Coordinates: 40°42′28″N 82°43′00″W

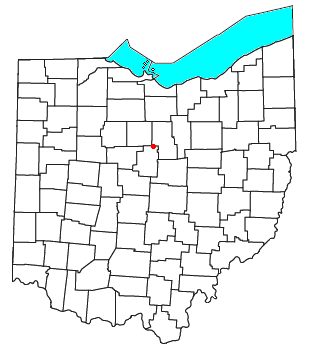
Location of Blooming Grove, Ohio

Blooming Grove is an unincorporated community in northeastern North Bloomfield Township, Morrow County, Ohio, United States. The community is located at the junction of State Route 97 and Morrow County Road 20. The nearest city is Galion, Ohio, located to the northwest. Mount Gilead, the county seat of Morrow County, is located southwest of Blooming Grove on State Route 61.

== History ==
Blooming Grove was platted in 1835. The name Blooming Grove is commendatory. The post office at Blooming Grove was called Corsica. This post office was established in 1844, and remained in operation until 1912.

The community is the nearest settlement to the birthplace of Warren G. Harding, the 29th President of the United States of America. President Harding's father, George Tryon Harding, was also born in the district. The Harding birthplace is no longer standing, but the site is marked by an Ohio Historical Society Marker.

The Olentangy River begins 3/4 of a mile southwest of the village.
