= Bloomfield, Morrow County, Ohio =

Unincorporated community in Ohio, U.S.

Coordinates: 40°21′49″N 82°43′29″W

Bloomfield is an unincorporated community in Morrow County, in the U.S. state of Ohio.

== History ==
Bloomfield was platted in 1845. A post office called Bloomfield was established in 1834, and remained in operation until 1914.
