= Saint James, Ohio =

Unincorporated community in Ohio, U.S.

Coordinates: 40°39′43″N 82°49′45″W

Saint James is an unincorporated community in Morrow County, in the U.S. state of Ohio.

== History ==
A post office called Saint James was established in 1890, and remained in operation until 1935. Besides the post office, Saint James had a railroad station and a country store.
