= Steam Corners, Ohio =

Unincorporated community in Ohio, U.S.

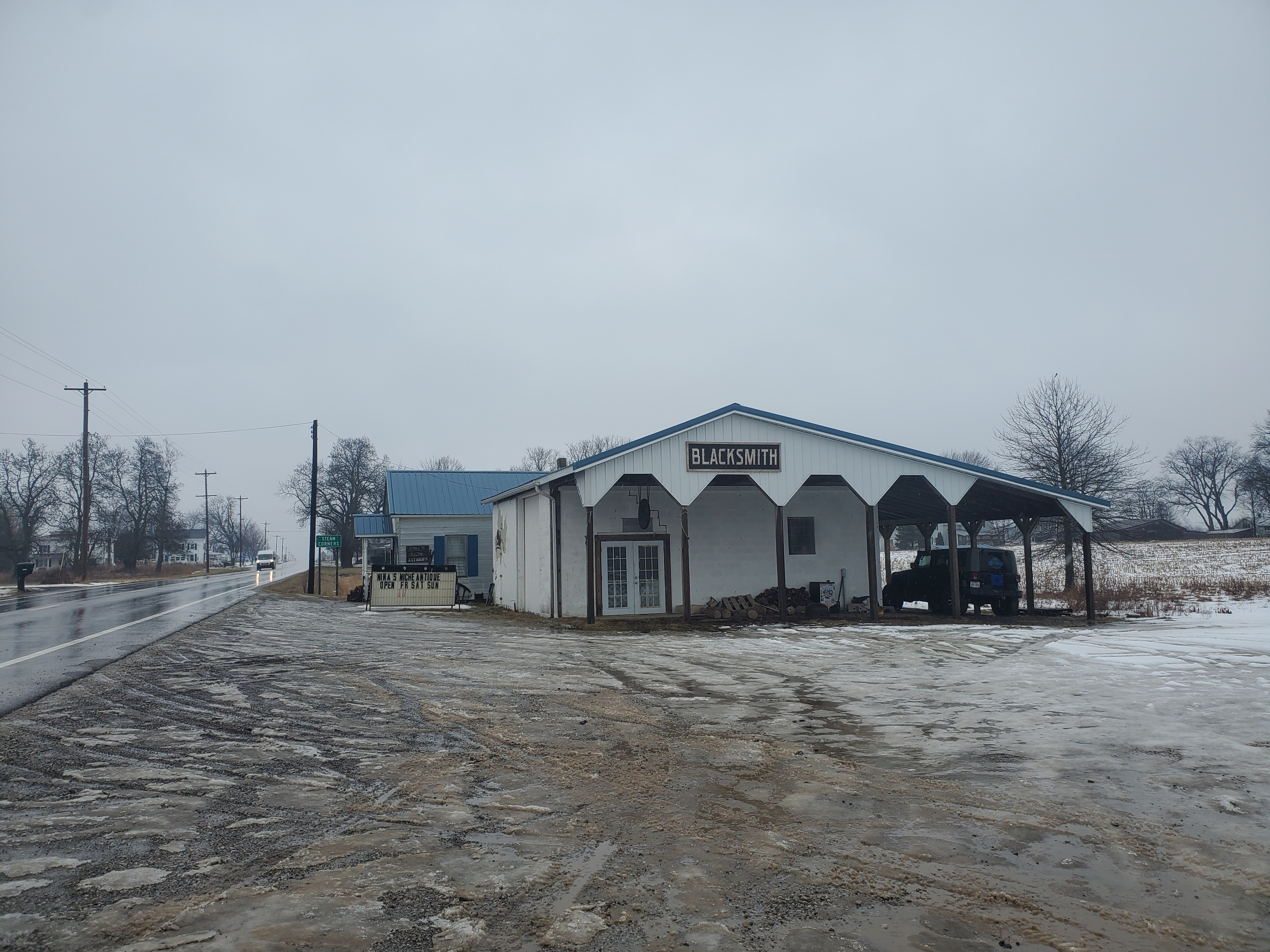
- Blacksmith in Steam Corners

- Location within Ohio Location within the United States
- Coordinates: 40°40′52″N 82°39′52″W
- Country: United States
- State: Ohio
- County: Morrow
- Township: Troy
- ZIP Codes: 44904 (Lexington) 44903 (Ontario)

Steam Corners is an unincorporated community in Troy Township, Morrow County, in the U.S. state of Ohio.

== History ==
Steam Corners had its start when a steam-powered sawmill was built there, on account of which the town also received its name. A post office called Steam Corners was established in 1865, and remained in operation until 1901.
