= Westfield, Ohio =

Unincorporated community in Ohio, U.S.

Coordinates: 40°25′56″N 82°58′55″W

Westfield is an unincorporated community in Morrow County, in the U.S. state of Ohio.

== History ==
A post office called Westfield was established in 1821, and remained in operation until 1907. Westfield once had its own schoolhouse.
