= Chilton C. Baker =

American politician (1874–1967)

Member of the Minnesota House of Representatives from the 52nd district
- In office January 5, 1943 – January 6, 1947

Personal details
- Born: Chilton Clyde Baker; May 2, 1874 Morrow County, Ohio, U.S.
- Died: September 28, 1967 (aged 93)
- Resting place: Grand Rapids, Minnesota, U.S.
- Party: Independent-Republican
- Spouse: Nellie Frances Holloway (m. 1898)
- Children: 4
- Parent(s): Clinton Albertus Baker; Ellen Jane Emig
- Education: Johnsville High School; Ohio Northern University (MA, BS); University of Minnesota
- Profession: Politician, educator

Chilton Clyde "C.C." Baker (May 2, 1874 – September 28, 1967) was an American politician and educator from Grand Rapids, Minnesota who served in the Minnesota House of Representatives from 1943 to 1947, representing the 52nd legislative district of Minnesota in the 53rd and 54th Minnesota Legislatures.

== Early life and education ==
Baker was born in Morrow County, Ohio on May 2, 1874, to Clinton Albertus Baker and Ellen Jane Emig.

Baker graduated from Johnsville High School in 1891. He also attended Ohio Northern University, graduating with a Bachelor of Science in 1896. Baker also obtained a Master of Arts degree from the university in 1898. He subsequently attended summer courses at the University of Minnesota.

== Career ==
Baker served in the Minnesota House of Representatives from 1943 to 1947, representing the 52nd legislative district of Minnesota in the 53rd and 54th Minnesota Legislatures.

During his time in office, Baker served on the following committees.

- Civil Administration
- Education
- Taxes
- Welfare

Baker's time in office began on January 5, 1943, and concluded on January 6, 1947. His district included representation for Itasca County.

Baker was considered an Independent-Republican.

Outside of the Minnesota Legislature, Baker was an educator. He served as superintendent of public schools of Sherburn, Minnesota for eight years. He served a similar position for Jackson schools for the following five years. In 1911, Baker became superintendent of public schools of Albert Lea.

== Personal life and death ==
Baker married Nellie Frances Holloway in Morrow, Ohio on August 4, 1898. They had four children together.

Baker was a member of the Albert Lea Men's League. He was affiliated with both Freemasonry and the Knights of Pythias.

Baker resided in Deer River, Minnesota prior to his death. He died at the age of 93 on September 28, 1967.

Minnesota House of Representatives
Preceded by —	Member of the Minnesota House of Representatives from the 52nd district 1943–1947	Succeeded by —
