= West Point, Morrow County, Ohio =

Unincorporated community in Ohio, U.S.

Coordinates: 40°38′21″N 82°47′06″W

West Point is an unincorporated community in Morrow County, in the U.S. state of Ohio.

== History ==
West Point was laid out around 1848. The post office at West Point had the name Whetstone. A post office called Whetstone was established in 1827, and remained in operation until 1964. Besides the post office, West Point had a church and country store.
