= Washington Township, Morrow County, Ohio =

Township in Ohio, US

- Township
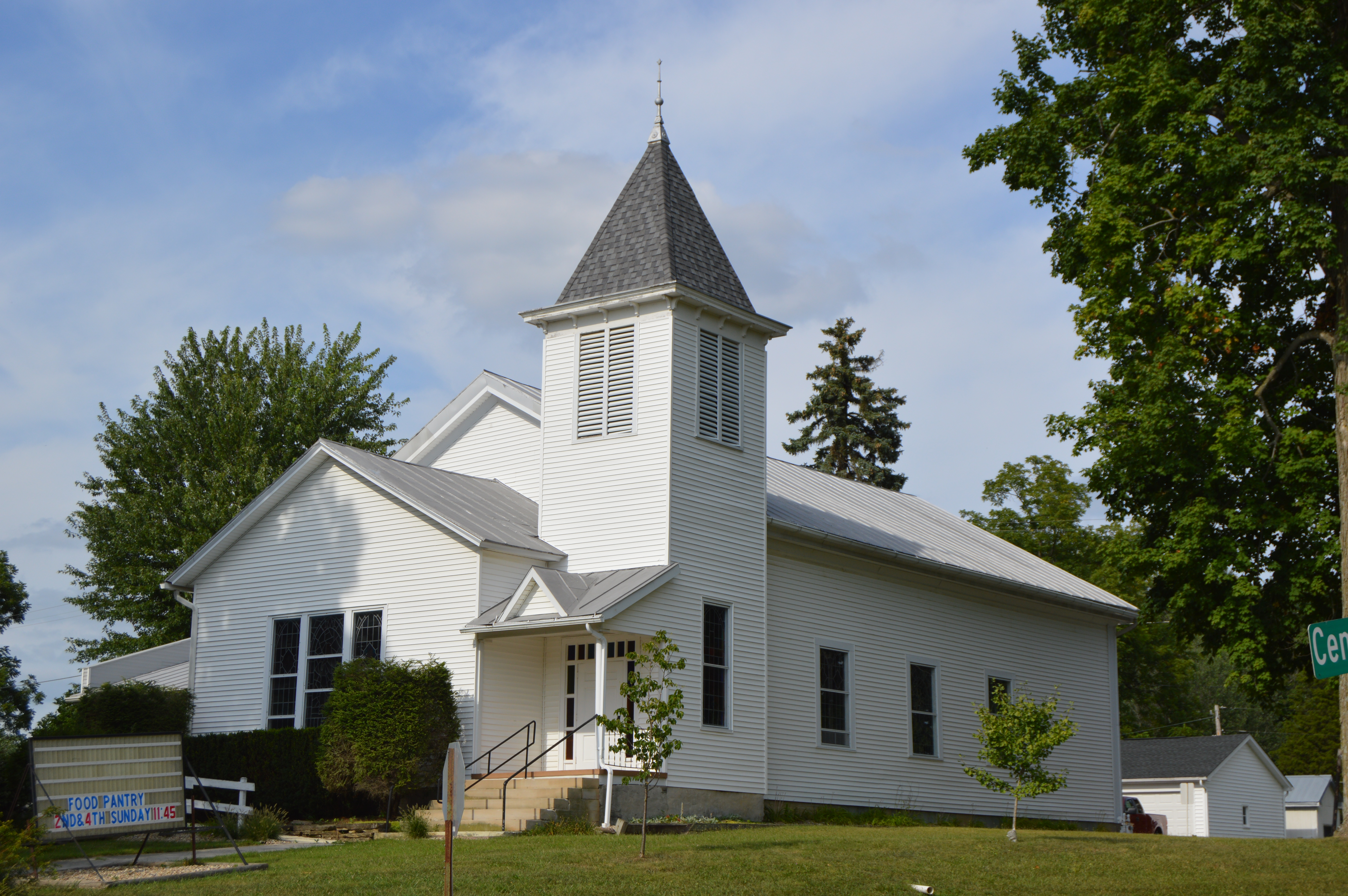
- Presbyterian church at Iberia

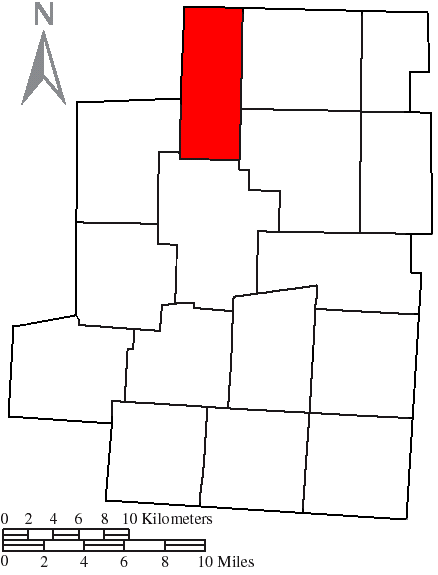
- Location of Washington Township in Morrow County
- Coordinates: 40°39′46″N 82°49′30″W
- Country: United States
- State: Ohio
- County: Morrow

Area
  - Total: 22.4 sq mi (57.9 km^{2})
  - Land: 22.2 sq mi (57.5 km^{2})
  - Water: 0.12 sq mi (0.3 km^{2})
- Elevation: 1,178 ft (359 m)

Population (2020)
  - Total: 1,261
  - Density: 56.8/sq mi (21.9/km^{2})
- Time zone: UTC-5 (Eastern (EST))
  - Summer (DST): UTC-4 (EDT)
- FIPS code: 39-81508
- GNIS feature ID: 1086711

Washington Township is one of the sixteen townships of Morrow County, Ohio, United States. The 2020 census found 1,261 people in the township.

== Geography ==
Located in the northwestern corner of the county, it borders the following townships:

- Polk Township, Crawford County - north
- North Bloomfield Township - east
- Congress Township - southeast
- Gilead Township - south
- Canaan Township - southwest
- Tully Township, Marion County - west
- Whetstone Township, Crawford County - northwest

No municipalities are located in Washington Township, although the census-designated place of Iberia lies in the western part of the township and the locale of Surprise can still be identified in the southeast corner of section 10.

== Name and history ==
Washington Township was organized in 1824. It is one of forty-three Washington Townships statewide.

== Government ==
The township is governed by a three-member board of trustees, who are elected in November of odd-numbered years to a four-year term beginning on the following January 1. Two are elected in the year after the presidential election and one is elected in the year before it. There is also an elected township fiscal officer, who serves a four-year term beginning on April 1 of the year after the election, which is held in November of the year before the presidential election. Vacancies in the fiscal officership or on the board of trustees are filled by the remaining trustees.
