= Iberia, Ohio =

- Census-designated place
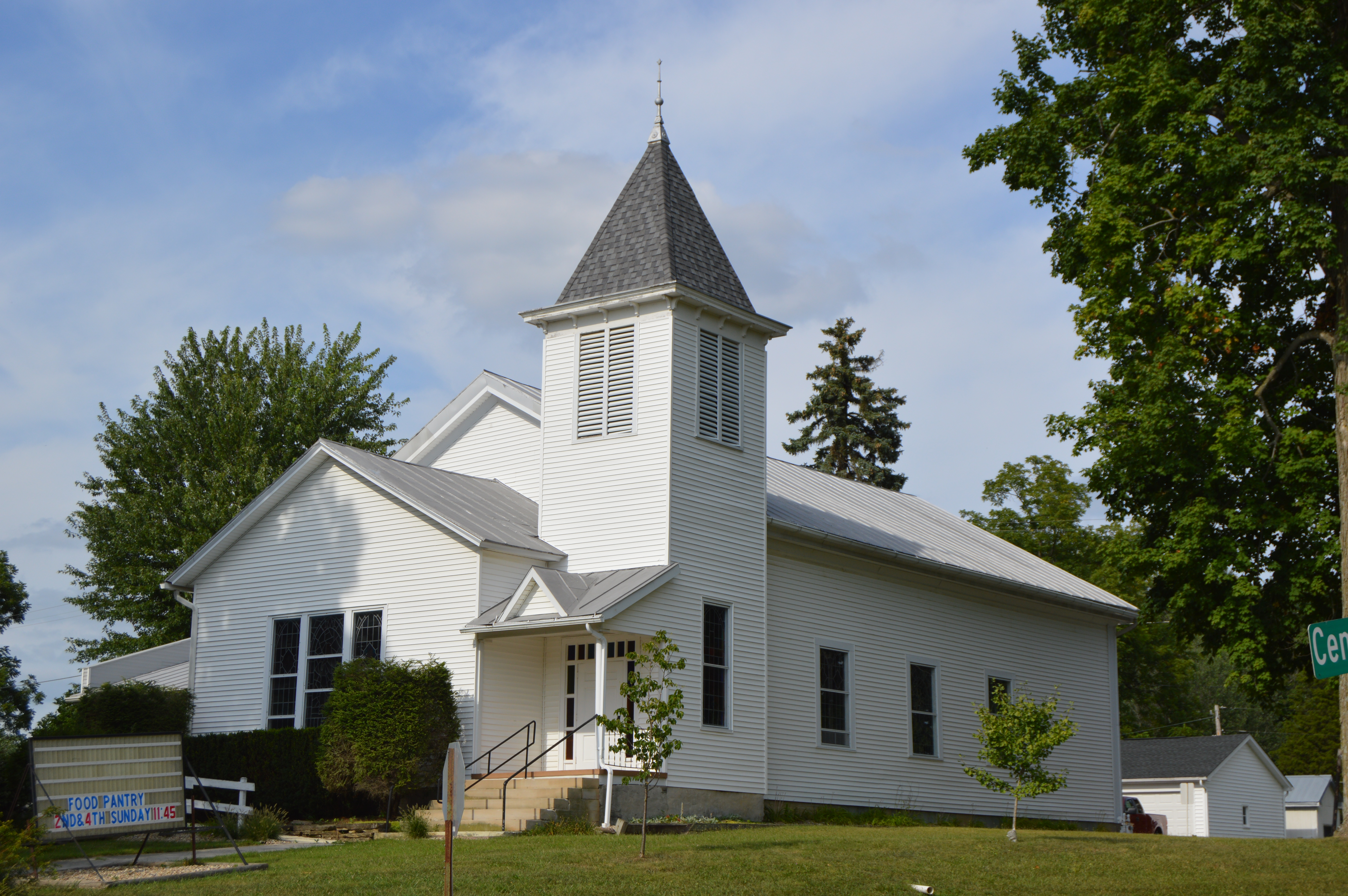
- Presbyterian church in Iberia

- Location within Ohio Location within the United States
- Coordinates: 40°40′29″N 82°50′25″W
- Country: United States
- State: Ohio
- County: Morrow
- Township: Washington

Area
  - Total: 3.867 sq mi (10.02 km^{2})
  - Land: 3.854 sq mi (9.98 km^{2})
  - Water: 0.013 sq mi (0.034 km^{2})
- Elevation: 1,093 ft (333 m)

Population (2020)
  - Total: 431
  - Density: 111.8/sq mi (43.2/km^{2})
- Time zone: UTC-5 (Eastern (EST))
  - Summer (DST): UTC-4 (EDT)
- ZIP Codes: 43325 (Iberia); 44833 (Galion)
- FIPS code: 39-37142
- GNIS feature ID: 2628905

Iberia is an unincorporated community and census-designated place in Washington Township, Morrow County, Ohio, United States. The population was 431 at the 2020 census.The ZIP code assigned to Iberia by the United States Postal Service is 43325.

== History ==
Iberia was founded in 1827 and platted in 1832 by Frederick Meyers and Samuel Foster. The community most likely was named after the Iberian Peninsula. On modern maps, the town is located at the junction of State Route 309 and Morrow County Road 30.

Iberia was once the home of Iberia College, later Ohio Central College, a Presbyterian Church affiliated institution of higher learning. Its most notable graduate was Warren G. Harding, the 29th President of the United States. Following the cessation of classes, the records and alumni of Ohio Central College were assumed by Muskingum College of New Concord, Ohio.

The first president of Iberia College was the Rev. George A. Gordon, an abolitionist and local Presbyterian minister who refused a presidential pardon granted by Abraham Lincoln. The minister had been convicted for violating the Fugitive Slave Law. He died in 1868 and was buried in Iberia Cemetery. His actions were but a part of the operations of the Underground Railroad, along which Iberia was a significant host to several "stations".

Iberia's greatest period of growth occurred at the turn of the 20th century when the community served as a farm community center. For a short period in the 1920s, the town was located along the "Marion" spur of the Lincoln Highway.

== Geography ==
Iberia is located in central Ohio, northern Morrow County, and the western part of Washington Township. Its western border is the Marion County line. The center of the community is at the junction of Ohio State Route 309 and Morrow County Road 30. SR 309 leads northeast 6 miles (10 km) to Galion and west-southwest 16 miles (26 km) to Marion. State Route 61 forms part of the eastern border of the community and leads south 9 miles (14 km) to Mount Gilead, the county seat.

According to the U.S. Census Bureau, the Iberia CDP has a total area of 3.87 square miles (10.02 km^{2}), of which 0.01 square miles (0.03 km^{2}), or 0.34%, are water. The area is drained by Flat Run, which flows westward on the north side of town. Flat Run is a tributary of the Olentangy River, part of the Scioto River watershed leading to the Ohio.

Historical population
Census	Pop.	Note	%±
2010	452		—
2020	431		−4.6%
U.S. Decennial Census

== Education ==
The community is served by the Northmor Local School District which formerly operated Iberia Elementary School in the community.

== Notable people ==
- John "Harry" McNeal (1878–1945), professional baseball player for the Cleveland Bluebirds
