= West Liberty, Morrow County, Ohio =

Unincorporated community in Ohio, U.S.

Coordinates: 40°22′40″N 82°53′27″W

West Liberty is an unincorporated community in Morrow County, in the U.S. state of Ohio.

== History ==
West Liberty was laid out in 1837. The community was also known as Stantontown, after Jesse Stanton, a pioneer settler. A post office called Stantontown was established in 1880, and remained in operation until 1906.
