= Ossing Run =

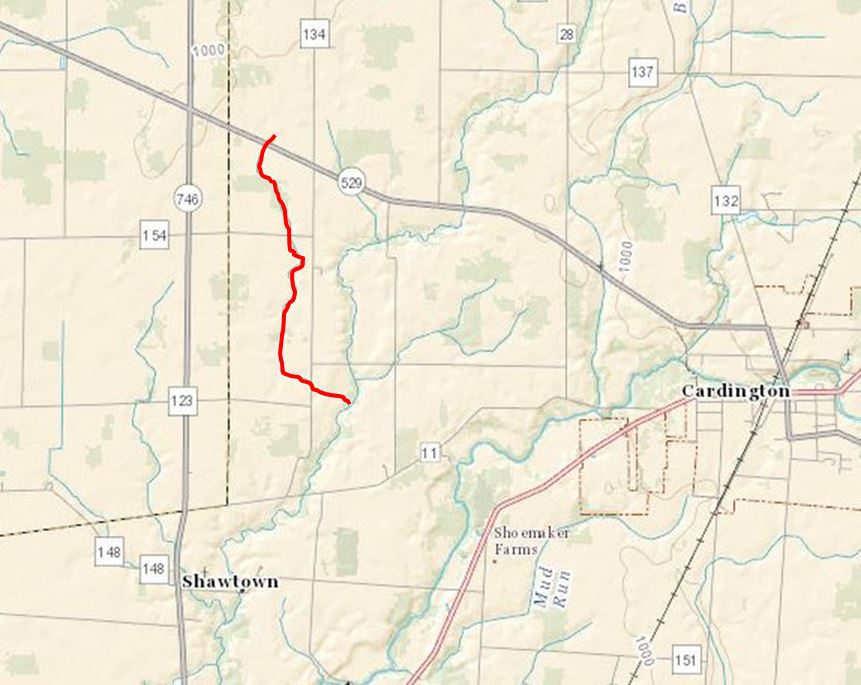
- Ossing Run is located near Cardington, Ohio

Location
- Country: United States

Physical characteristics
- Source
  - coordinates: 40°31′23″N 82°57′05″W
  - elevation: 968 ft (295 m)
- Mouth
  - coordinates: 40°29′57″N 82°56′40″W
- Length: 2.2 mi (3.5 km)

Ossing Run is a tributary of Shaw Creek that flows through Morrow County, Ohio.

The United States Geological Survey’s Geographic Names Information System (GNIS) classifies Ossing Run as a stream with an identification number of 2761345. The feature name was entered into the GNIS system in April 2014.
