= Shawtown, Morrow County, Ohio =

Unincorporated community in Ohio, U.S.

Coordinates: 40°29′00″N 82°57′51″W

Shawtown is an unincorporated community in Morrow County, in the U.S. state of Ohio.

Shawtown was named for the Shaw family of pioneer settlers who arrived in the area around the time of the War of 1812.
