= Shaw Creek (Ohio) =

Stream in Ohio, U.S.

Coordinates: 40°27′52″N 82°57′23″W

Shaw Creek is a stream in the U.S. state of Ohio.

Shaw Creek was named for Jonathan Shaw Sr., a pioneer settler who built a mill on Shaw Creek in 1814.

Shaw Creek flows into Whetstone Creek which is located adjacent to Cardington, Ohio.

== See also ==
- Ossing Run
- List of rivers of Ohio
