= Franklin Township, Morrow County, Ohio =

Township in Ohio, US

- Township
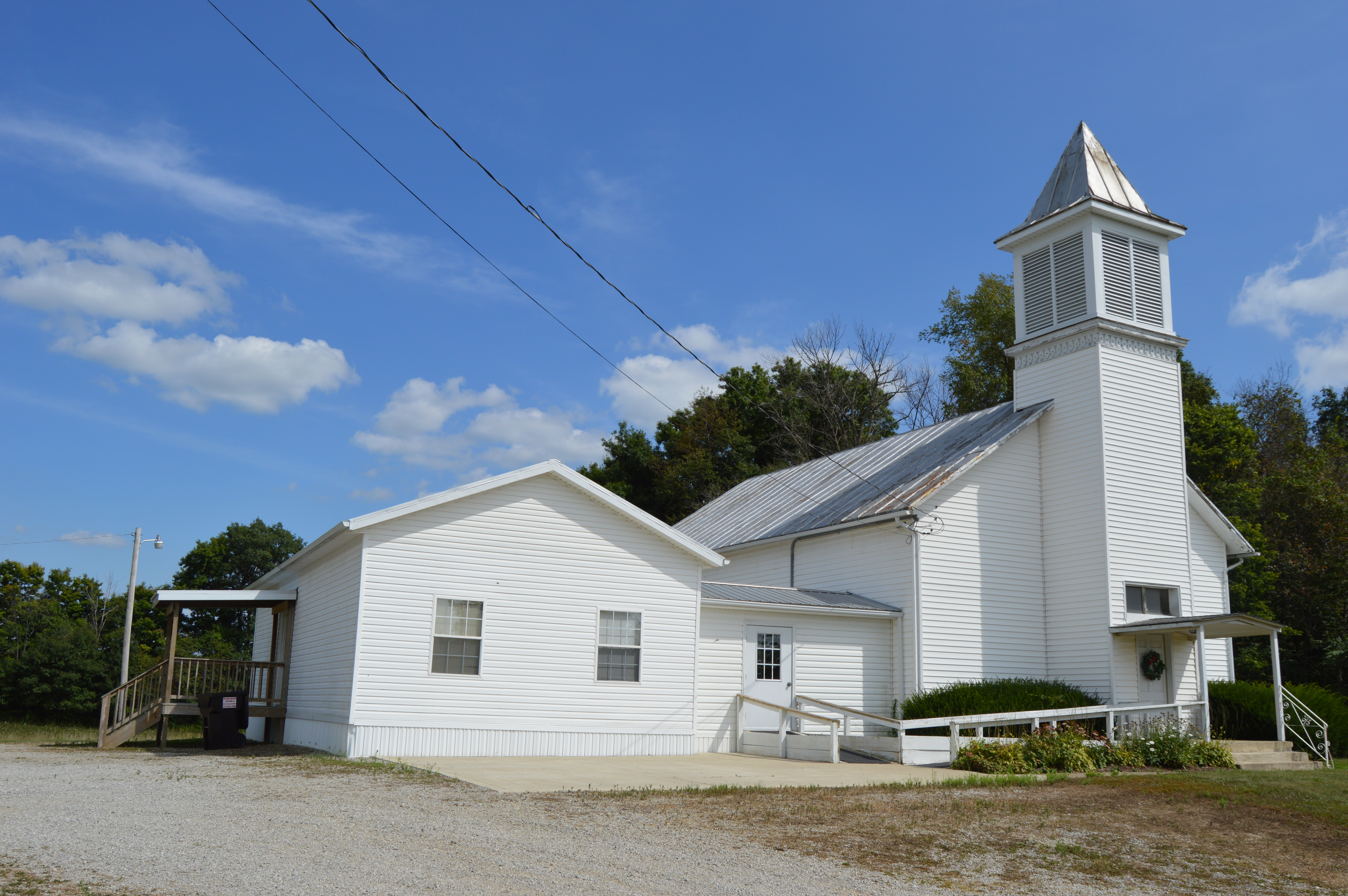
- Pulaskiville Community Bible Church

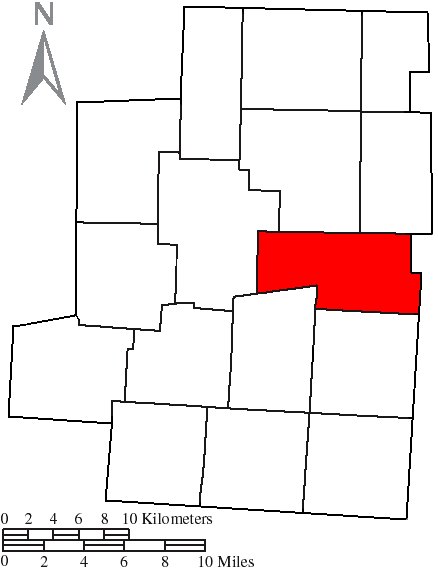
- Location of Franklin Township in Morrow County
- Coordinates: 40°31′40″N 82°42′23″W
- Country: United States
- State: Ohio
- County: Morrow

Area
  - Total: 27.5 sq mi (71.2 km^{2})
  - Land: 27.4 sq mi (71.0 km^{2})
  - Water: 0.077 sq mi (0.2 km^{2})
- Elevation: 1,283 ft (391 m)

Population (2020)
  - Total: 1,609
  - Density: 58.7/sq mi (22.7/km^{2})
- Time zone: UTC-5 (Eastern (EST))
  - Summer (DST): UTC-4 (EDT)
- FIPS code: 39-28378
- GNIS feature ID: 1086702
- Website: https://www.franklin-township.net/

Franklin Township is one of the sixteen townships of Morrow County, Ohio, United States. The 2020 census found 1,609 people in the township.

== Geography ==
Located in the eastern part of the county, it borders the following townships:

- Congress Township - north
- Perry Township - northeast
- Middlebury Township, Knox County - east
- Wayne Township, Knox County - southeast corner
- Chester Township - south
- Harmony Township - southwest
- Gilead Township - west

No municipalities are located in Franklin Township. Hidden Lakes is a census-designated place in the northwest part of the township.

== Name and history ==
Franklin Township was organized in 1823, and named for Benjamin Franklin. It is one of twenty-one Franklin Townships statewide.

== Government ==
The township is governed by a three-member board of trustees, who are elected in November of odd-numbered years to a four-year term beginning on the following January 1. Two are elected in the year after the presidential election and one is elected in the year before it. There is also an elected township fiscal officer, who serves a four-year term beginning on April 1 of the year after the election, which is held in November of the year before the presidential election. Vacancies in the fiscal officership or on the board of trustees are filled by the remaining trustees.
