= North Bloomfield Township, Morrow County, Ohio =

Township in Ohio, US

- Township
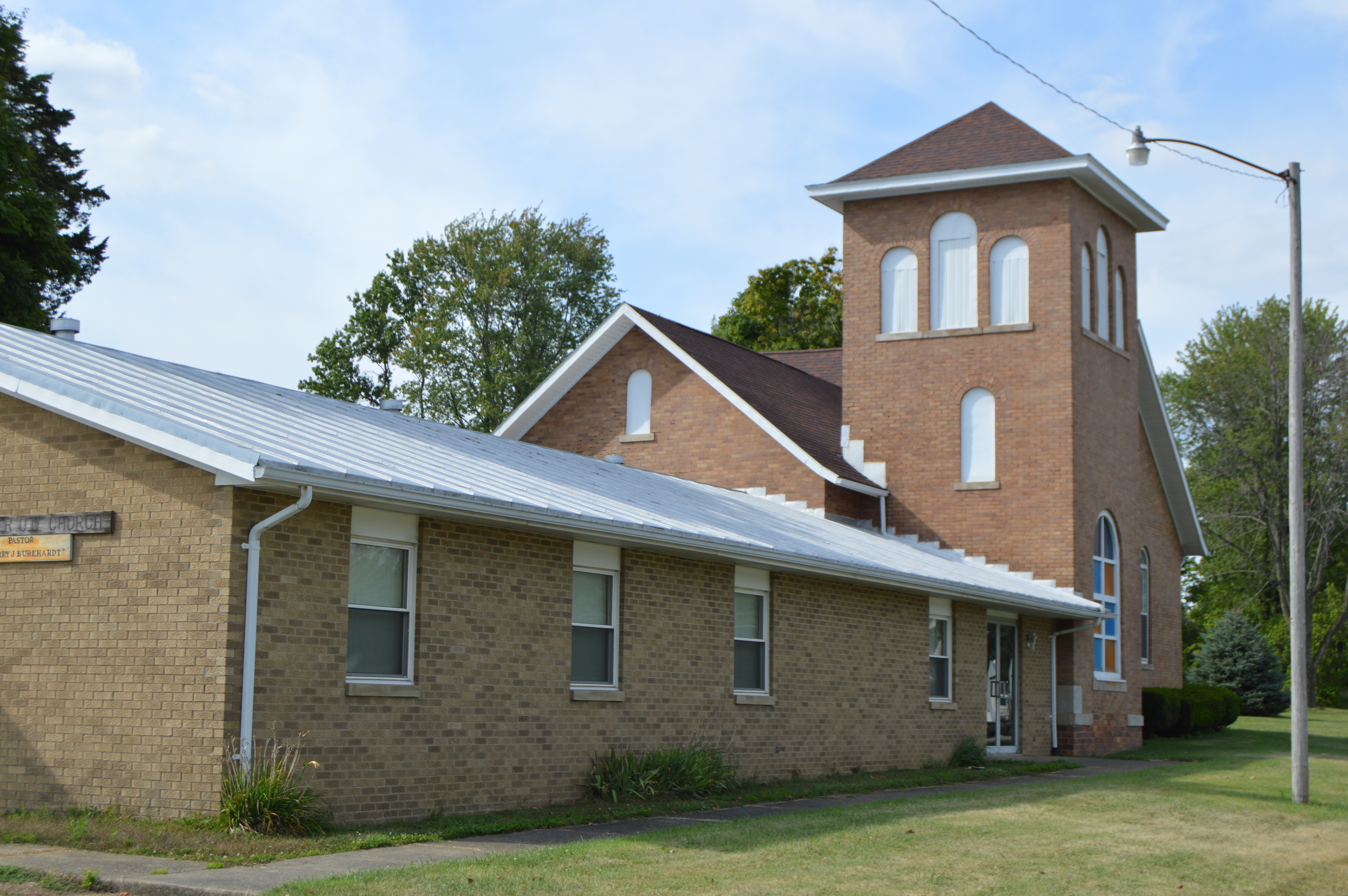
- Ebenezer United Methodist Church

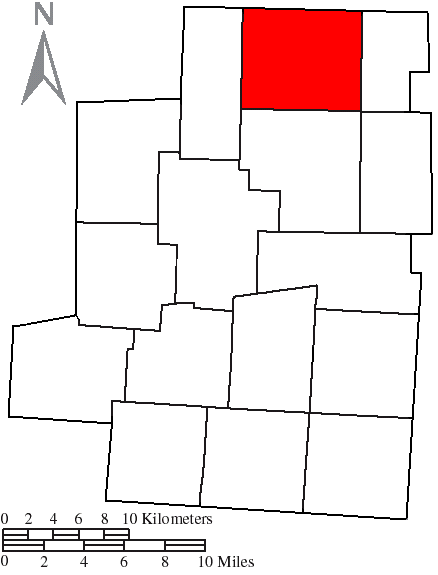
- Location of North Bloomfield Township in Morrow County
- Coordinates: 40°41′1″N 82°45′22″W
- Country: United States
- State: Ohio
- County: Morrow
- Established: 1817

Area
  - Total: 29.7 sq mi (76.9 km^{2})
  - Land: 29.7 sq mi (76.9 km^{2})
  - Water: 0 sq mi (0.0 km^{2})
- Elevation: 1,358 ft (414 m)

Population (2020)
  - Total: 1,853
  - Density: 62.4/sq mi (24.1/km^{2})
- Time zone: UTC-5 (Eastern (EST))
  - Summer (DST): UTC-4 (EDT)
- FIPS code: 39-56224
- GNIS feature ID: 1086706
- Website: https://northbloomfield.org/

North Bloomfield Township is one of the sixteen townships of Morrow County, Ohio, United States. The 2020 census found 1,853 people in the township.

== Geography ==
Located in the northern part of the county, it borders the following townships:

- Sandusky Township, Richland County - north
- Troy Township, Richland County - northeast corner
- Troy Township - east
- Perry Township - southeast corner
- Congress Township - south
- Washington Township - west
- Polk Township, Crawford County - northwest

No municipalities are located in North Bloomfield Township, although the unincorporated community of Blooming Grove lies in the northeastern part of the township. Blooming Grove's post office from 1844 until 1912 was named Corsica.

== Name and history ==
North Bloomfield Township was organized in 1817. Bloomfield is a descriptive name for the wildflowers once abundant within its borders. It is the only North Bloomfield Township statewide.

== Government ==
The township is governed by a three-member board of trustees, who are elected in November of odd-numbered years to a four-year term beginning on the following January 1. Two are elected in the year after the presidential election and one is elected in the year before it. There is also an elected township fiscal officer, who serves a four-year term beginning on April 1 of the year after the election, which is held in November of the year before the presidential election. Vacancies in the fiscal officership or on the board of trustees are filled by the remaining trustees.
