= Troy Township, Morrow County, Ohio =

Township in Ohio, US

- Township
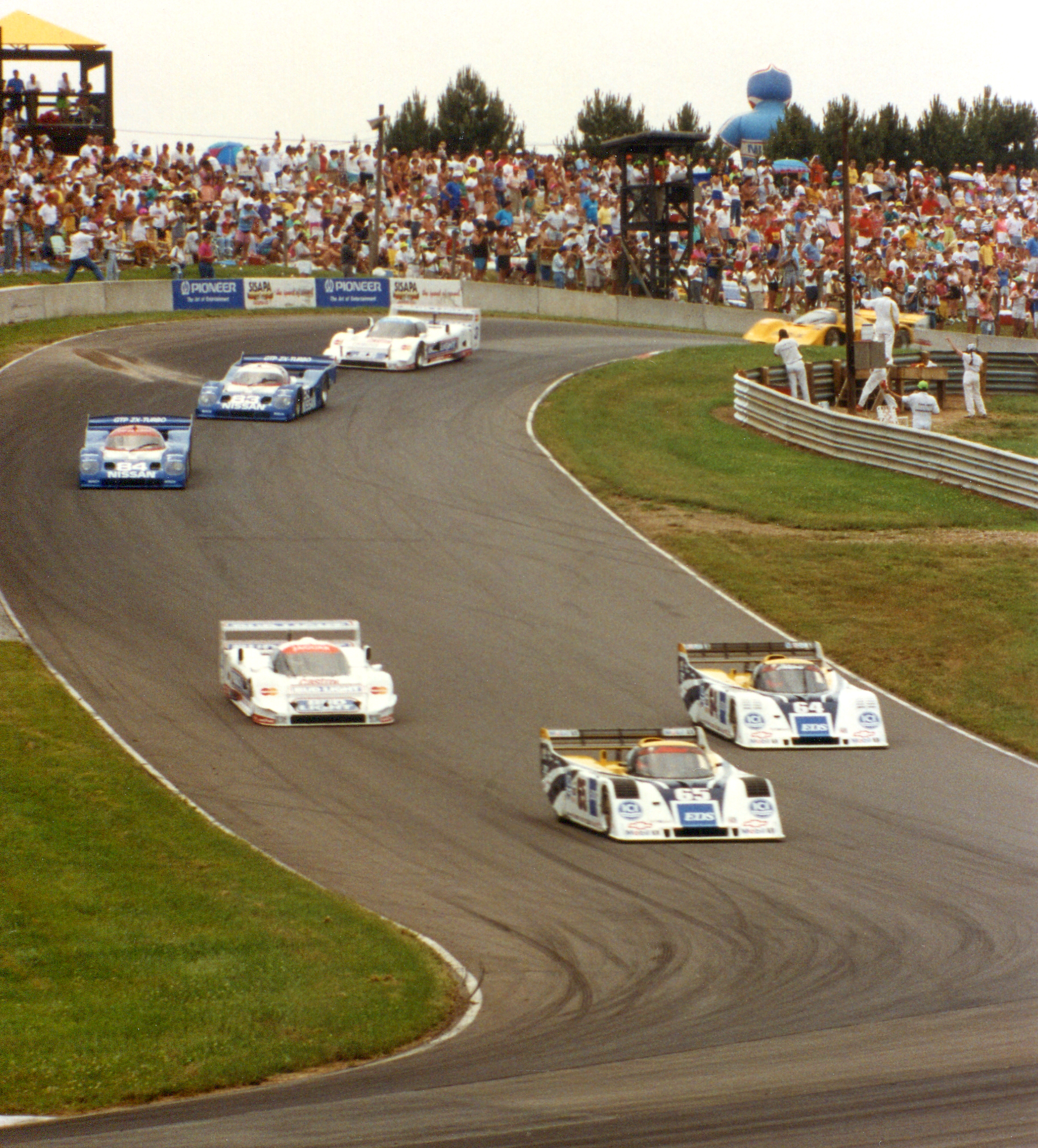
- Race at the Mid-Ohio Sports Car Course

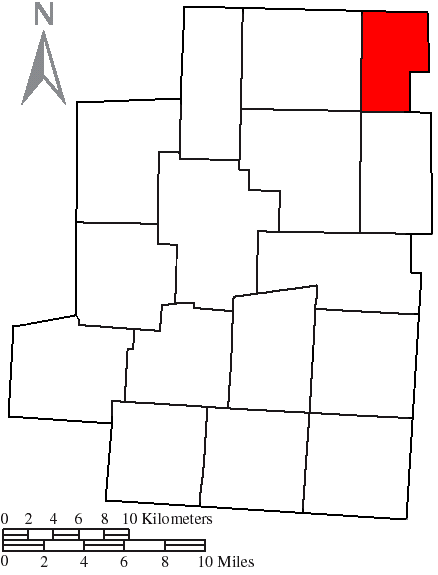
- Location of Troy Township in Morrow County
- Coordinates: 40°40′38″N 82°39′18″W
- Country: United States
- State: Ohio
- County: Morrow

Area
  - Total: 14.7 sq mi (38.1 km^{2})
  - Land: 14.3 sq mi (37.1 km^{2})
  - Water: 0.39 sq mi (1.0 km^{2})
- Elevation: 1,398 ft (426 m)

Population (2020)
  - Total: 1,156
  - Density: 80.7/sq mi (31.2/km^{2})
- Time zone: UTC-5 (Eastern (EST))
  - Summer (DST): UTC-4 (EDT)
- FIPS code: 39-77602
- GNIS feature ID: 1086710

Troy Township is one of the sixteen townships of Morrow County, Ohio, United States. The 2020 census found 1,156 people in the township.

== Geography ==
Located in the northeastern corner of the county, it borders the following townships:

- Troy Township, Richland County - northeast
- Perry Township - south
- Congress Township - southwest corner
- North Bloomfield Township - west
- Sandusky Township, Richland County - northwest corner

No municipalities are located in Troy Township, although the unincorporated community of Steam Corners lies in the central western part of the township.

The Mid-Ohio Sports Car Course is located in the township on Steam Corners Road at the location of the old Jugs Corners community, just west of the Richland County line.

== Name and history ==
It is one of seven Troy Townships statewide.

== Government ==
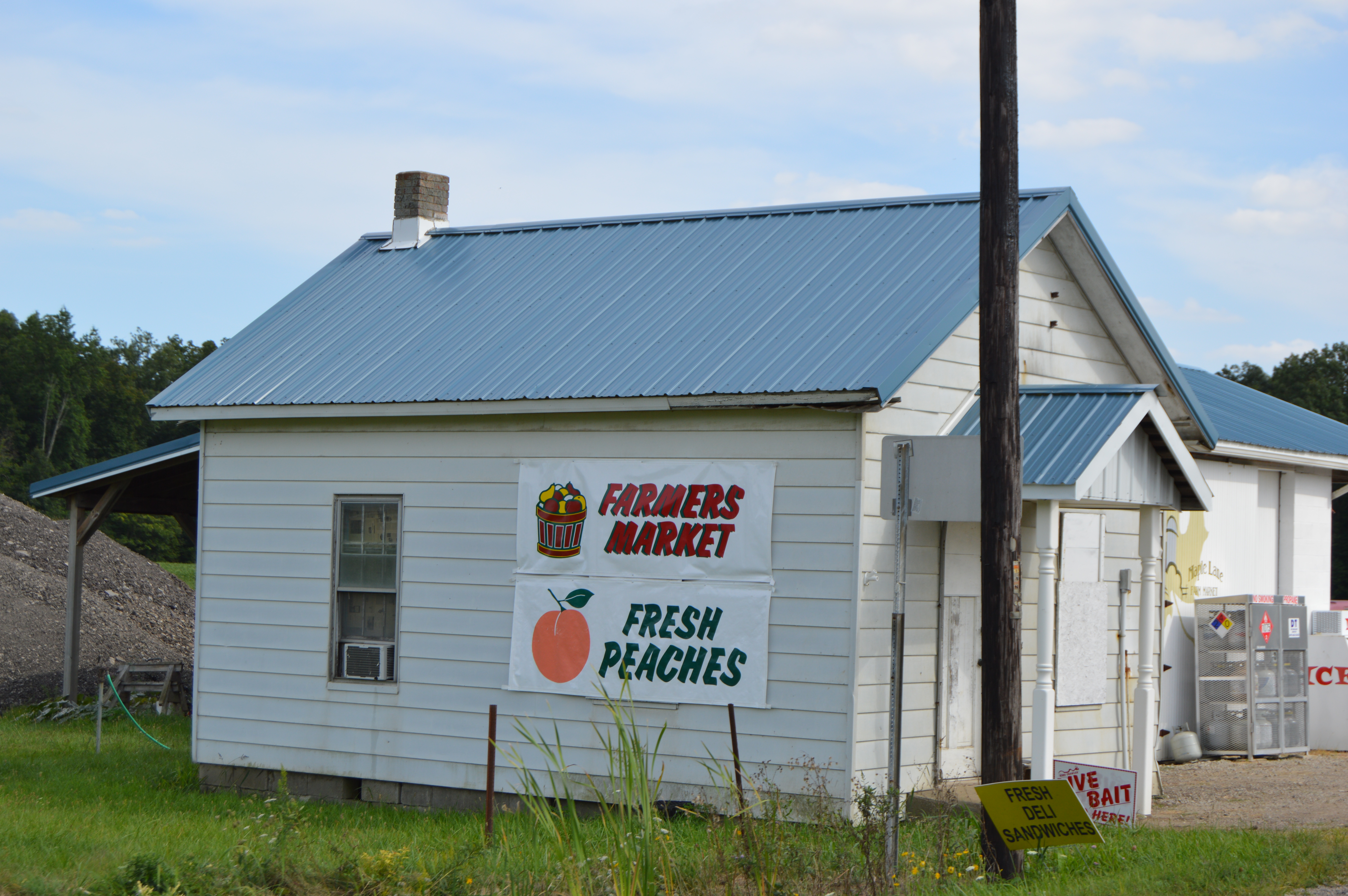
Township hall at Steam Corners

The township is governed by a three-member board of trustees, who are elected in November of odd-numbered years to a four-year term beginning on the following January 1. Two are elected in the year after the presidential election and one is elected in the year before it. There is also an elected township fiscal officer, who serves a four-year term beginning on April 1 of the year after the election, which is held in November of the year before the presidential election. Vacancies in the fiscal officership or on the board of trustees are filled by the remaining trustees.
