= North Woodbury, Ohio =

Unincorporated community in Ohio, U.S.

Coordinates: 40°35′38″N 82°39′45″W

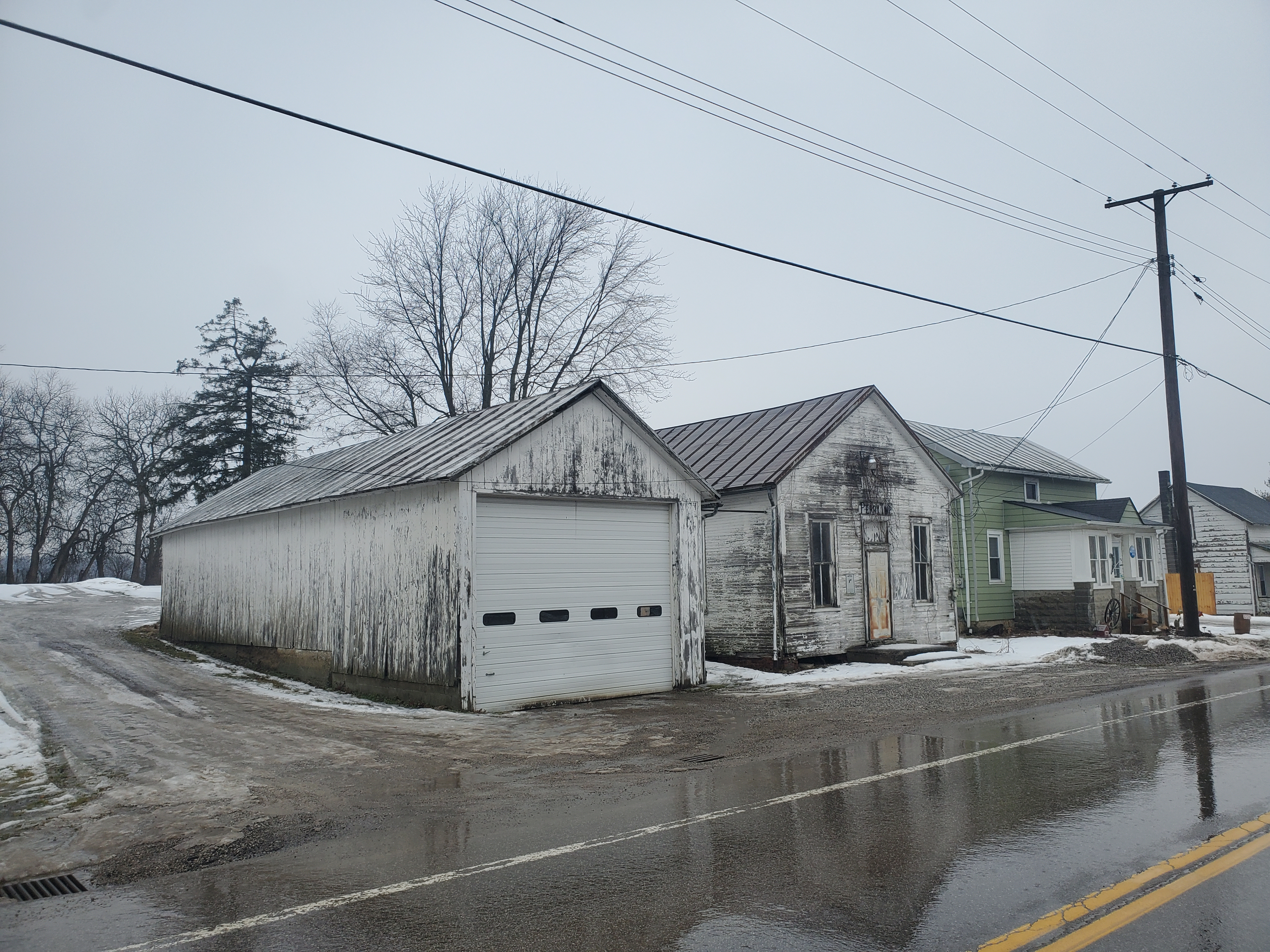
Buildings in North Woodbury

North Woodbury is an unincorporated community in Morrow County, in the U.S. state of Ohio.

== History ==
North Woodbury was platted in 1830. The post office at North Woodbury was called Woodview. This post office was established in 1843, and remained in operation until 1902.
