= Vails Corners, Ohio =

Unincorporated community in Ohio, U.S.

Coordinates: 40°21′53″N 82°45′13″W

Vails Corners is an unincorporated community in Morrow County, in the U.S. state of Ohio.

== History ==
A variant name is Vails Cross Roads. Vails Cross Roads had a tavern dating back to the 1830s. A post office called Vail's Cross Roads was established in 1850, and remained in operation until 1873. The community was named for the local Vail family.
