= Perry Township, Morrow County, Ohio =

Township in Ohio, US

- Township
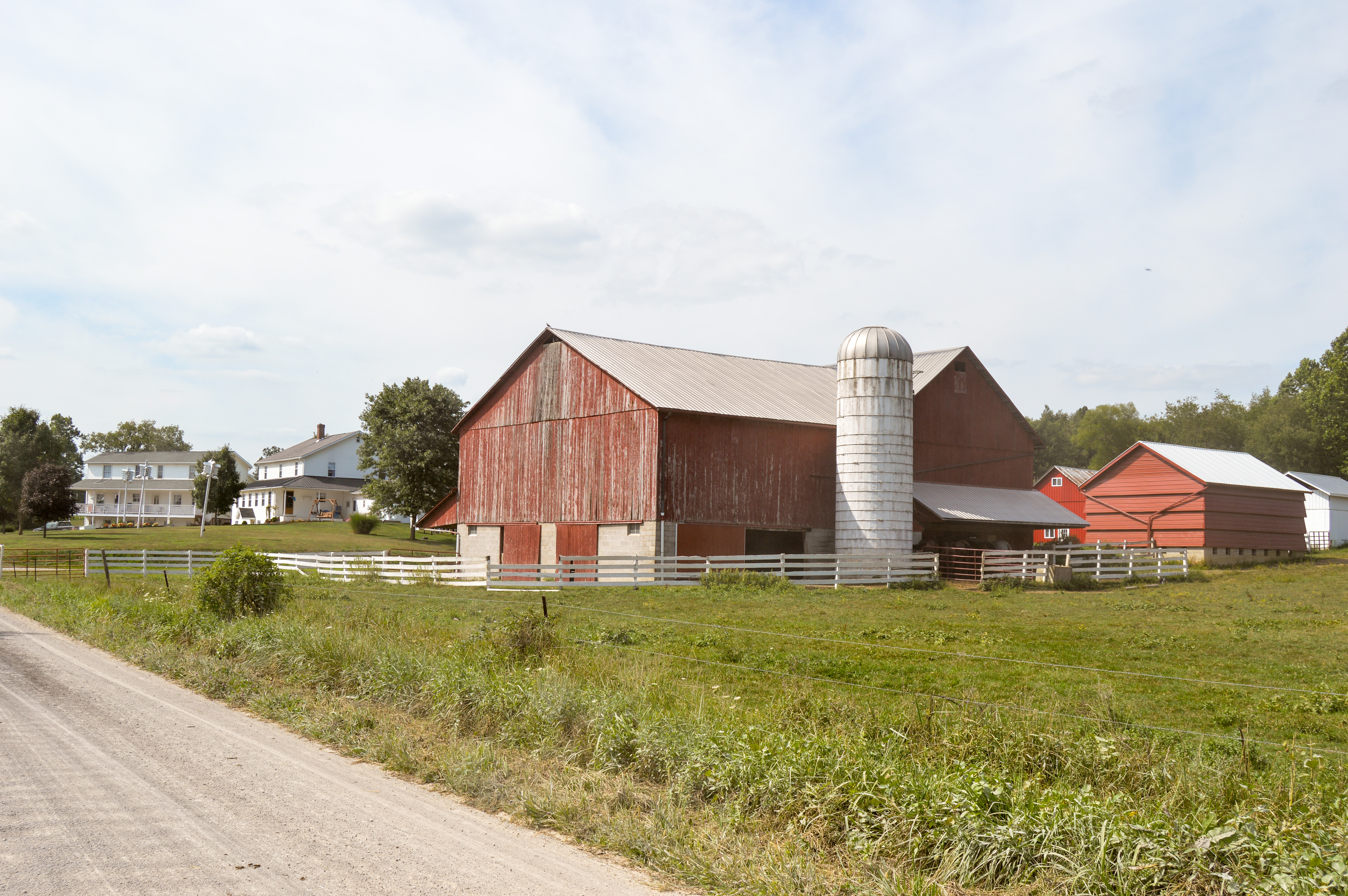
- One of the township's numerous Amish farms

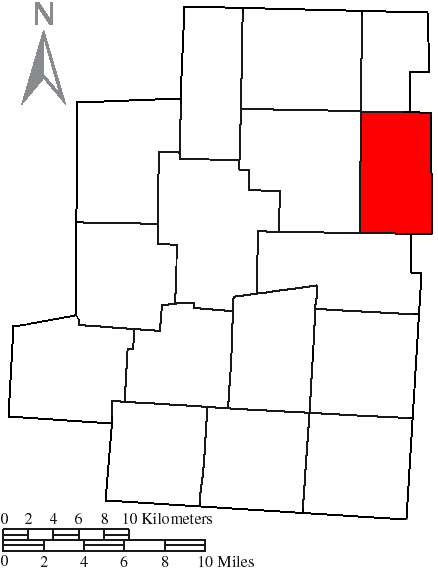
- Location of Perry Township in Morrow County
- Coordinates: 40°35′21″N 82°39′10″W
- Country: United States
- State: Ohio
- County: Morrow

Area
  - Total: 20.9 sq mi (54.2 km^{2})
  - Land: 20.9 sq mi (54.2 km^{2})
  - Water: 0 sq mi (0.0 km^{2})
- Elevation: 1,335 ft (407 m)

Population (2020)
  - Total: 1,971
  - Density: 94.2/sq mi (36.4/km^{2})
- Time zone: UTC-5 (Eastern (EST))
  - Summer (DST): UTC-4 (EDT)
- FIPS code: 39-61980
- GNIS feature ID: 1086707

Perry Township is one of the sixteen townships of Morrow County, Ohio, United States. At the 2020 census the township's population was 1,971 people.

== Geography ==
Located in the eastern part of the county, it borders the following townships:

- Troy Township - north
- Troy Township, Richland County - northeast
- Perry Township, Richland County - east
- Middlebury Township, Knox County - southeast
- Franklin Township - southwest
- Congress Township - west
- North Bloomfield Township - northwest corner

No municipalities are located in Perry Township, although the unincorporated community of Shauck lies in the northern part of the township.

== Name and history ==
Perry Township was organized in 1816, and was part of Richland County, Ohio. At first called Leipsic (after the German city), the township was soon renamed Perry to honor Commodore Oliver Hazard Perry, who led a United States Navy squadron to victory against a British Royal Navy squadron in the 1813 Battle of Lake Erie. Originally comprising two, 36-square-mile survey townships, Perry Township was divided in 1825; the western half becoming Congress Township. Perry Township was again divided in 1848, when Morrow County, Ohio, was created. The western half was transferred to the new county, the eastern half remained in Richland County, and both halves retained the name Perry Township. It is one of twenty-six Perry Townships statewide.

== Government ==
The township is governed by a three-member board of trustees, who are elected in November of odd-numbered years to a three-year term beginning on the following January 1. Two are elected in the year after the presidential election and one is elected in the year before it. There is also an elected township fiscal officer, who serves a four-year term beginning on April 1 of the year after the election, which is held in November of the year before the presidential election. Vacancies in the fiscal officership or on the board of trustees are filled by the remaining trustees.
