= New Enterprise Public School =

- U.S. National Register of Historic Places
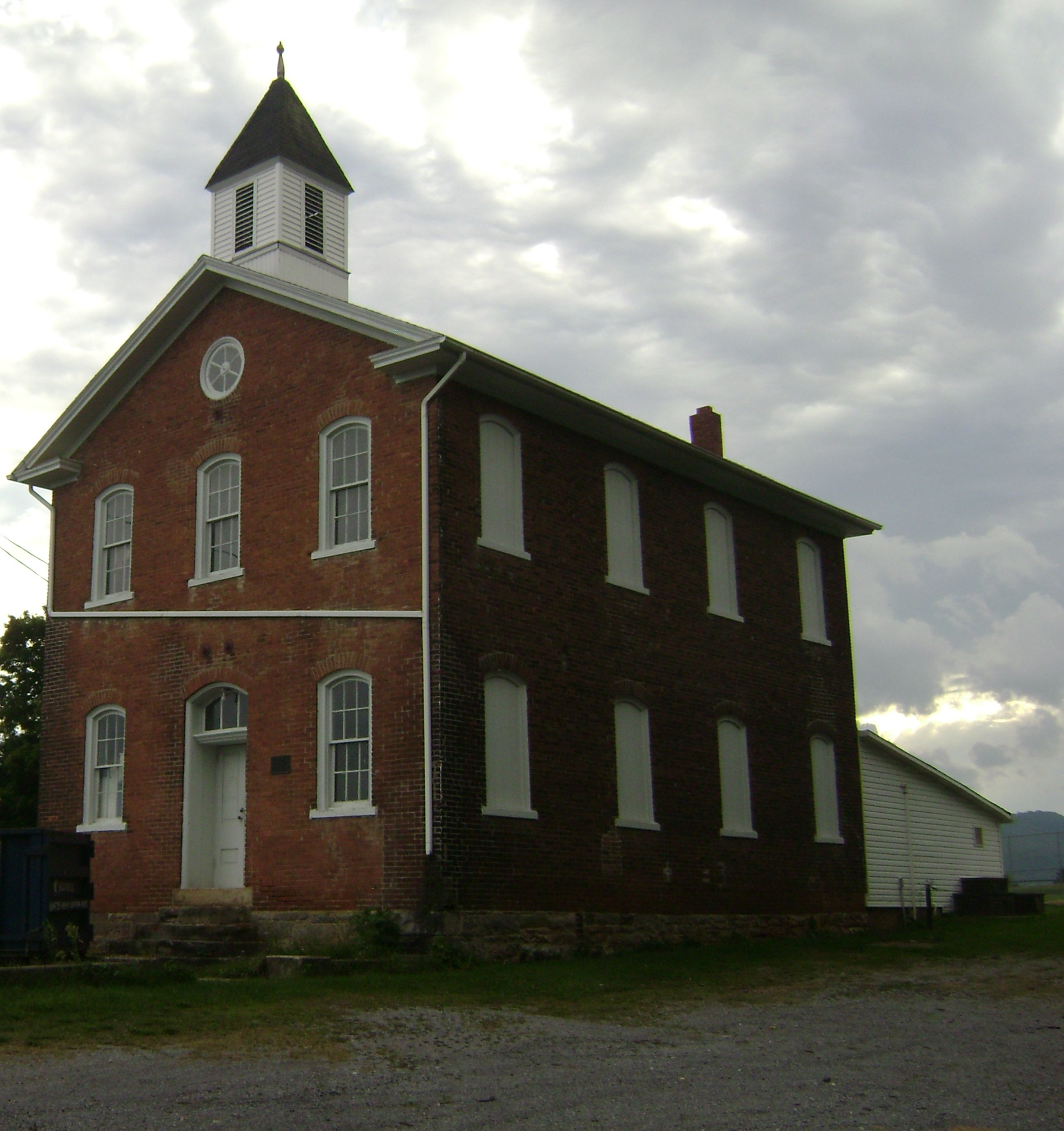
- New Enterprise Public School, September 2014

- Location within Pennsylvania Location within the United States
- Location: Off Pennsylvania Route 869 at New Enterprise, South Woodbury Township, Pennsylvania
- Coordinates: 40°10′17″N 78°24′27″W
- Area: 1.5 acres (0.61 ha)
- Built: 1881
- Architect: Fluke, John, B.
- NRHP reference No.: 81000528
- Added to NRHP: October 8, 1981

New Enterprise Public School is a historic school building located at South Woodbury Township in Bedford County, Pennsylvania. It was built in 1881, and is a two-story brick building, three-bays wide and four bays deep. It measures 28 feet, 2 inches, by 42 feet, 2 inches. It sits on a cut coursed stone foundation. It features a circular cartwheel window on the front gable and a wood frame bell tower.

It was listed on the National Register of Historic Places in 1981.
