= South Woodbury, Ohio =

Unincorporated community in Ohio, U.S.

Coordinates: 40°25′11″N 82°51′25″W

South Woodbury is an unincorporated community in Morrow County, in the U.S. state of Ohio.

== History ==
South Woodbury was laid out around 1830 by Daniel Wood, and named for him.
