= South Woodbury Township, Pennsylvania =

Township in Pennsylvania, US

Coordinates: 40°09′00″N 78°25′29″W

- Township
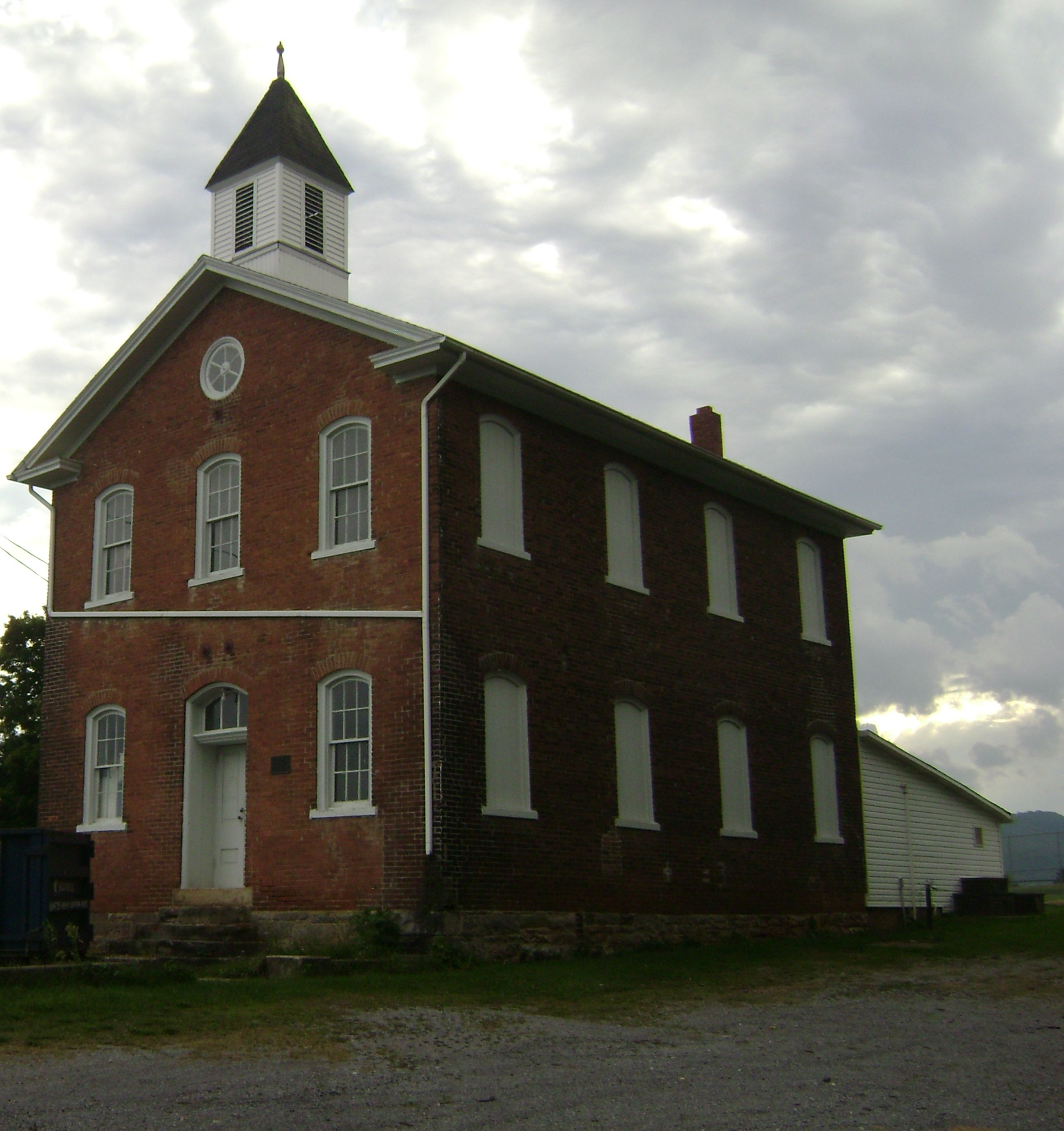
- New Enterprise Public School

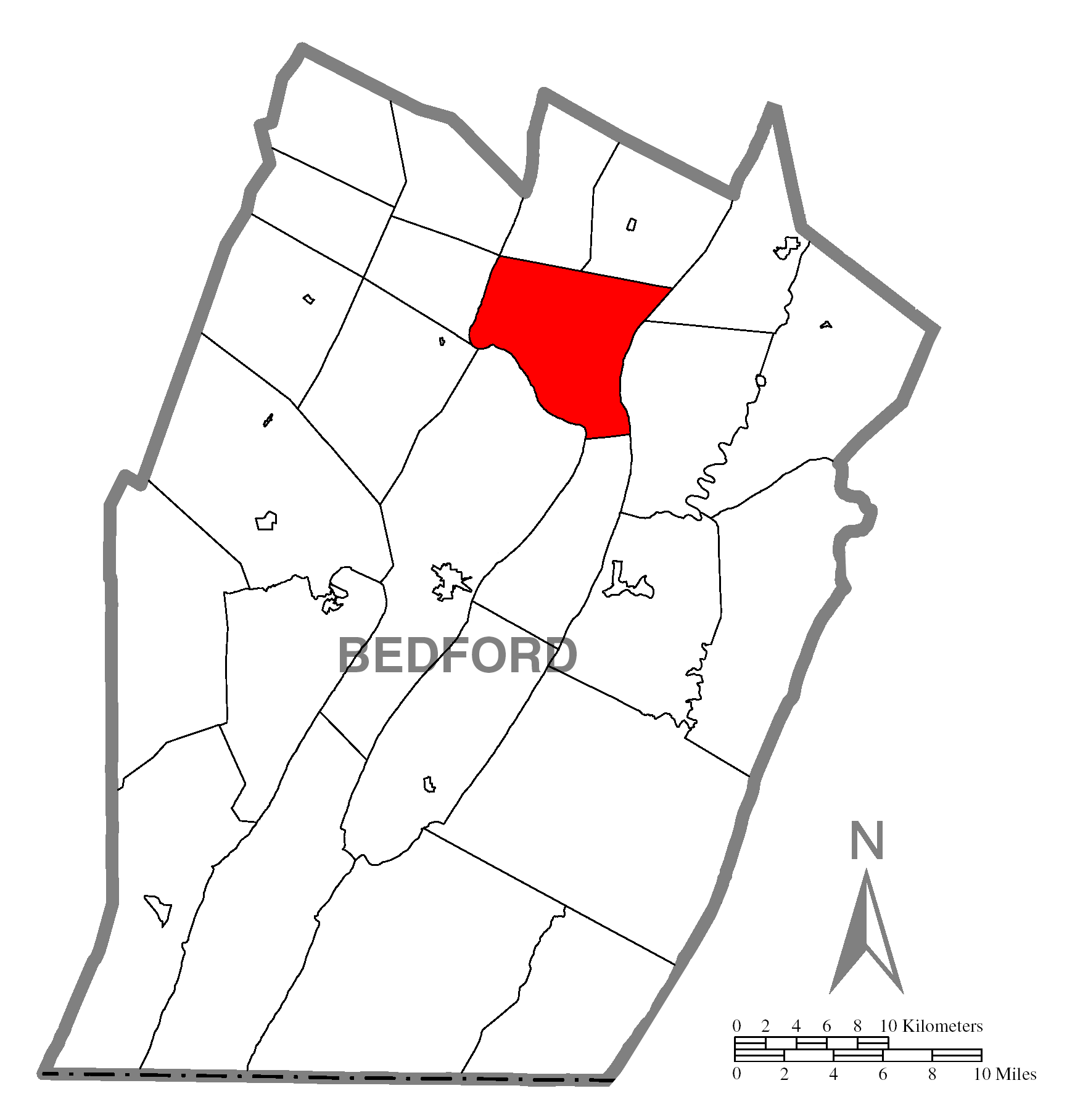
- Map of Bedford County, Pennsylvania highlighting South Woodbury Township

- Map of Bedford County, Pennsylvania
- Country: United States
- State: Pennsylvania
- County: Bedford
- Settled: 1760
- Incorporated: 1838

Area
  - Total: 33.75 sq mi (87.42 km^{2})
  - Land: 33.72 sq mi (87.33 km^{2})
  - Water: 0.035 sq mi (0.09 km^{2})

Population (2020)
  - Total: 2,082 ▼
  - Estimate (2023): 2,086
  - Density: 62.4/sq mi (24.09/km^{2})
- Time zone: UTC-5 (Eastern (EST))
  - Summer (DST): UTC-4 (EDT)
- Area code: 814
- FIPS code: 42-009-72656
- Website: https://southwoodburytownship.com/

South Woodbury Township is a township in Bedford County, Pennsylvania, United States. The population was 2,082 at the 2020 census.

== History ==
The New Enterprise Public School was listed on the National Register of Historic Places in 1981.

== Geography ==
South Woodbury Township is located in northern Bedford County and occupies the southern end of Morrison Cove, a mountain valley. The township's borders follow the ridgecrests of Dunning Mountain on the west, Evitts Mountain on the south, and Tussey Mountain on the east.

According to the United States Census Bureau, the township has a total area of 33.7 square miles (87.4 km^{2}), of which 0.035 square miles (0.09 km^{2}), or 0.10%, is water.

== Recreation ==
A portion of Pennsylvania State Game Lands Number 73 is located in the eastern end of the township.

== Demographics ==
Historical population
Census	Pop.	Note	%±
2010	2,155		—
2020	2,082		−3.4%
2023 (est.)	2,086		0.2%
U.S. Decennial Census

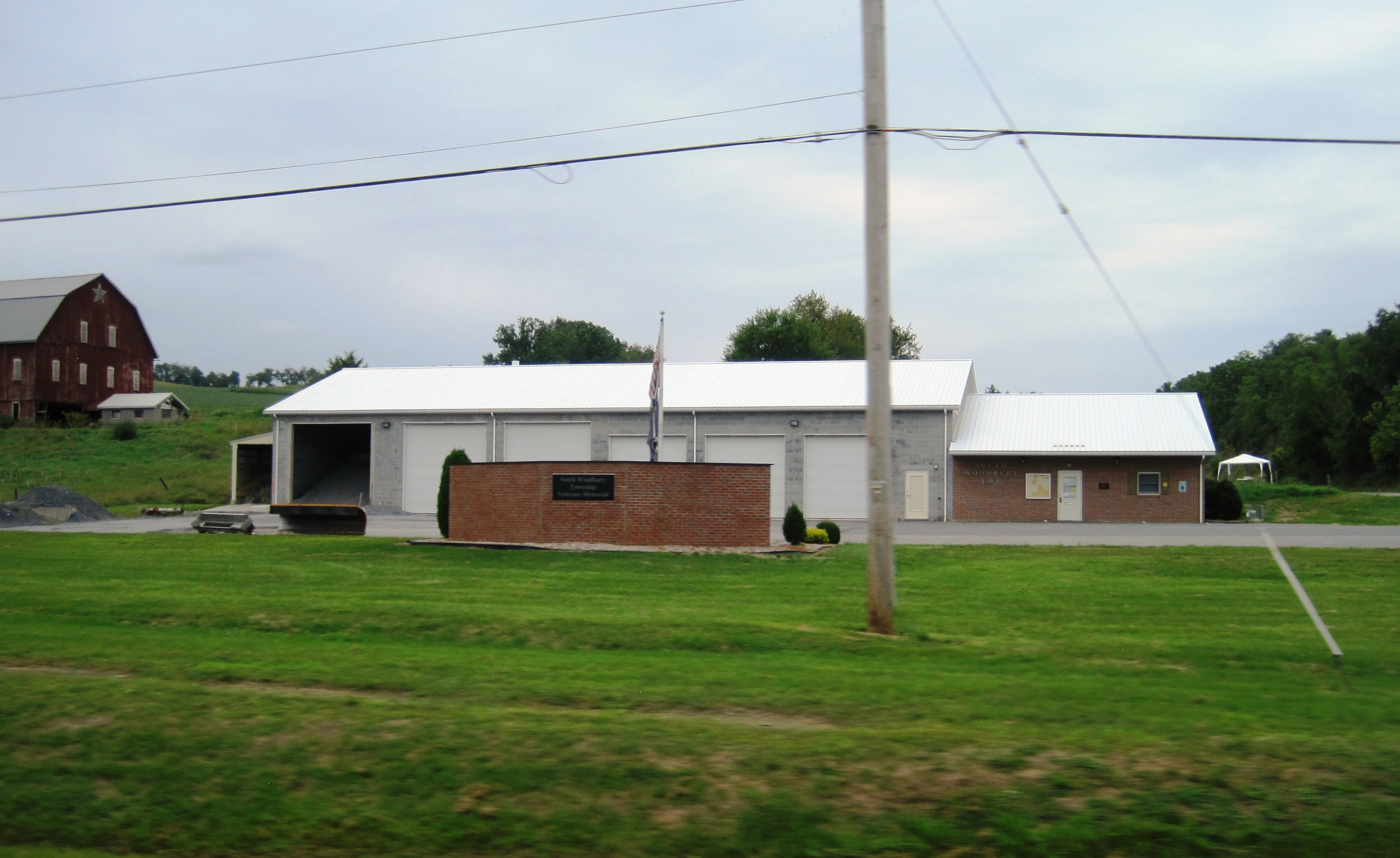
South Woodbury Town Hall

As of the census of 2000, there were 2,000 people, 719 households, and 586 families residing in the township. The population density was 58.6 inhabitants per square mile (22.6/km^{2}). There were 762 housing units at an average density of 22.3 units per square mile (8.6 units/km^{2}). The racial makeup of the township was 99.45% White, 0.05% African American, 0.05% Native American, 0.10% Asian, 0.10% from other races, and 0.25% from two or more races. Hispanic or Latino of any race were 0.30% of the population.

There were 719 households, out of which 37.6% had children under the age of 18 living with them, 70.1% were married couples living together, 7.5% had a female householder with no husband present, and 18.4% were non-families. 16.7% of all households were made up of individuals, and 7.5% had someone living alone who was 65 years of age or older. The average household size was 2.77 and the average family size was 3.11.

In the township the population was spread out, with 26.7% under the age of 18, 8.4% from 18 to 24, 30.4% from 25 to 44, 23.3% from 45 to 64, and 11.3% who were 65 years of age or older. The median age was 35 years. For every 100 females there were 101.8 males. For every 100 females age 18 and over, there were 101.5 males.

The median income for a household in the township was $36,129, and the median income for a family was $40,224. Males had a median income of $27,879 versus $21,250 for females. The per capita income for the township was $16,197. About 6.7% of families and 10.1% of the population were below the poverty line, including 15.2% of those under age 18 and 16.0% of those age 65 or over.
