= Williamsport, Morrow County, Ohio =

Unincorporated community in Ohio, U.S.

Coordinates: 40°34′46″N 82°43′48″W

Williamsport is an unincorporated community in Morrow County, in the U.S. state of Ohio.

== History ==
Williamsport was laid out in 1836 by William Dakan, and named for him. A nearby post office operated under the name Andrews. This post office was established in 1833, and was discontinued in 1903.
