= Gilead Township, Morrow County, Ohio =

Township in Ohio, US

- Township
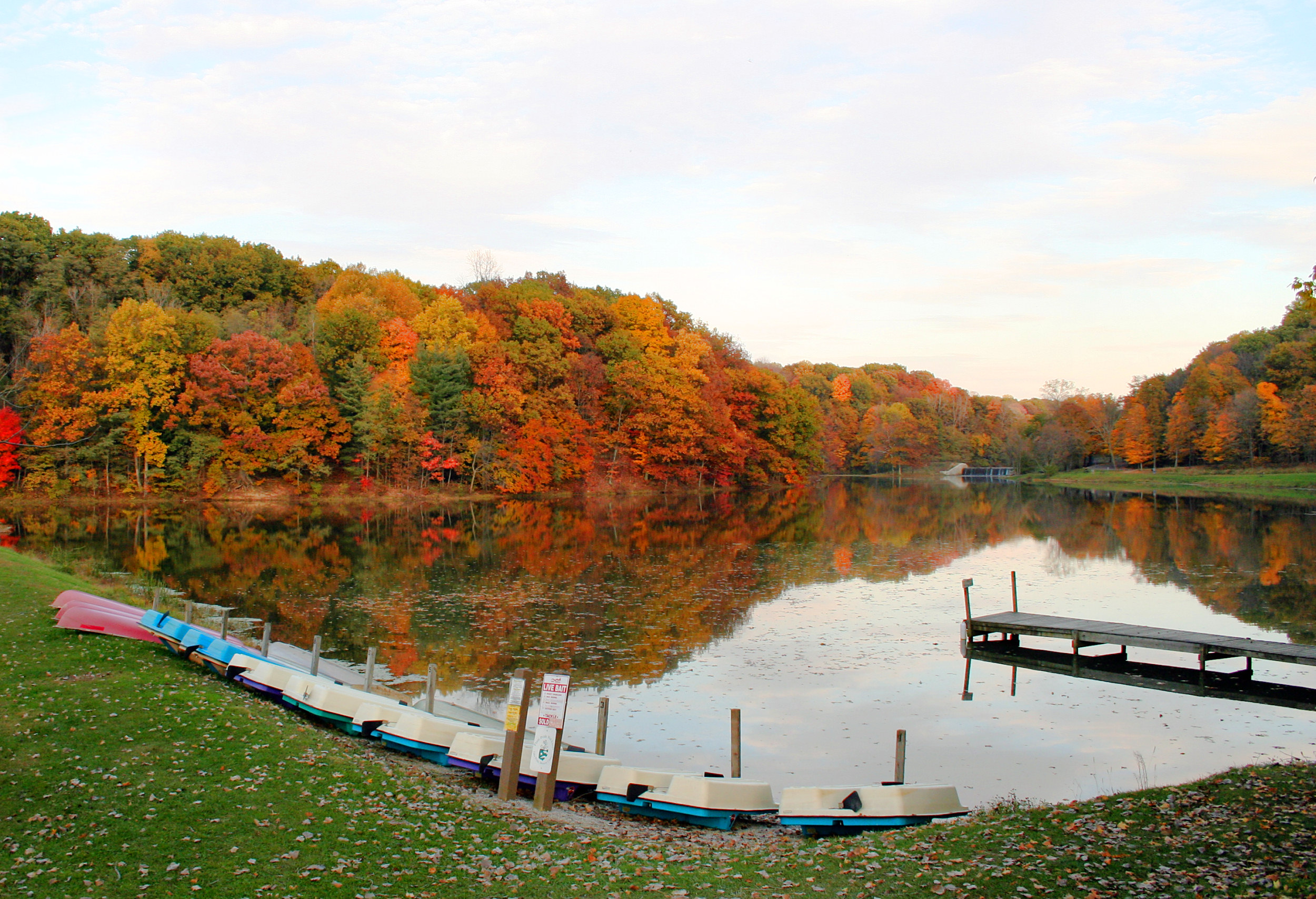
- Mount Gilead State Park

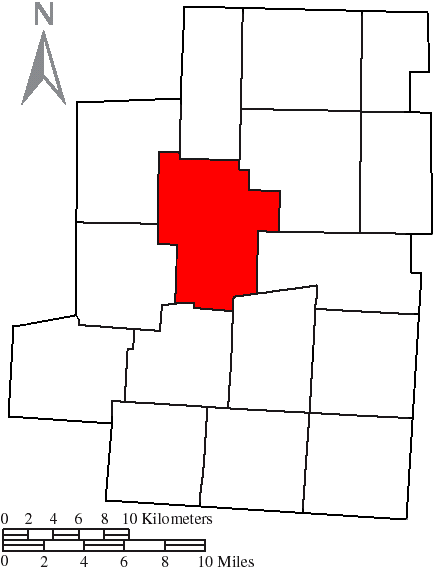
- Location of Gilead Township in Morrow County
- Coordinates: 40°33′13″N 82°50′9″W
- Country: United States
- State: Ohio
- County: Morrow

Area
  - Total: 34.2 sq mi (88.6 km^{2})
  - Land: 34.2 sq mi (88.5 km^{2})
  - Water: 0.039 sq mi (0.1 km^{2})
- Elevation: 1,089 ft (332 m)

Population (2020)
  - Total: 5,942
  - Density: 174/sq mi (67.1/km^{2})
- Time zone: UTC-5 (Eastern (EST))
  - Summer (DST): UTC-4 (EDT)
- FIPS code: 39-30128
- GNIS feature ID: 1086703
- Website: https://www.gileadtwp.org/

Gilead Township is one of the sixteen townships of Morrow County, Ohio, United States. The 2020 census found 5,942 people lived in the township; 3,503 lived in the village of Mount Gilead and 422 lived in the village of Edison.

== Geography ==
Located in the central part of the county, it borders the following townships:

- Washington Township - north
- Congress Township - northeast
- Franklin Township - east
- Harmony Township - southeast
- Lincoln Township - south
- Cardington Township - southwest
- Canaan Township - northwest

Two villages are located in Gilead Township: Edison in the west, and Mount Gilead, the county seat of Morrow County in the center.

== Name and history ==
Gilead Township was organized in 1835. It is the only Gilead Township statewide.

== Government ==
The township is governed by a three-member board of trustees, who are elected in November of odd-numbered years to a four-year term beginning on the following January 1. Two are elected in the year after the presidential election and one is elected in the year before it. There is also an elected township fiscal officer, who serves a four-year term beginning on April 1 of the year after the election, which is held in November of the year before the presidential election. Vacancies in the fiscal officership or on the board of trustees are filled by the remaining trustees.
