= Canaan Township, Morrow County, Ohio =

Township in Ohio, US

- Township
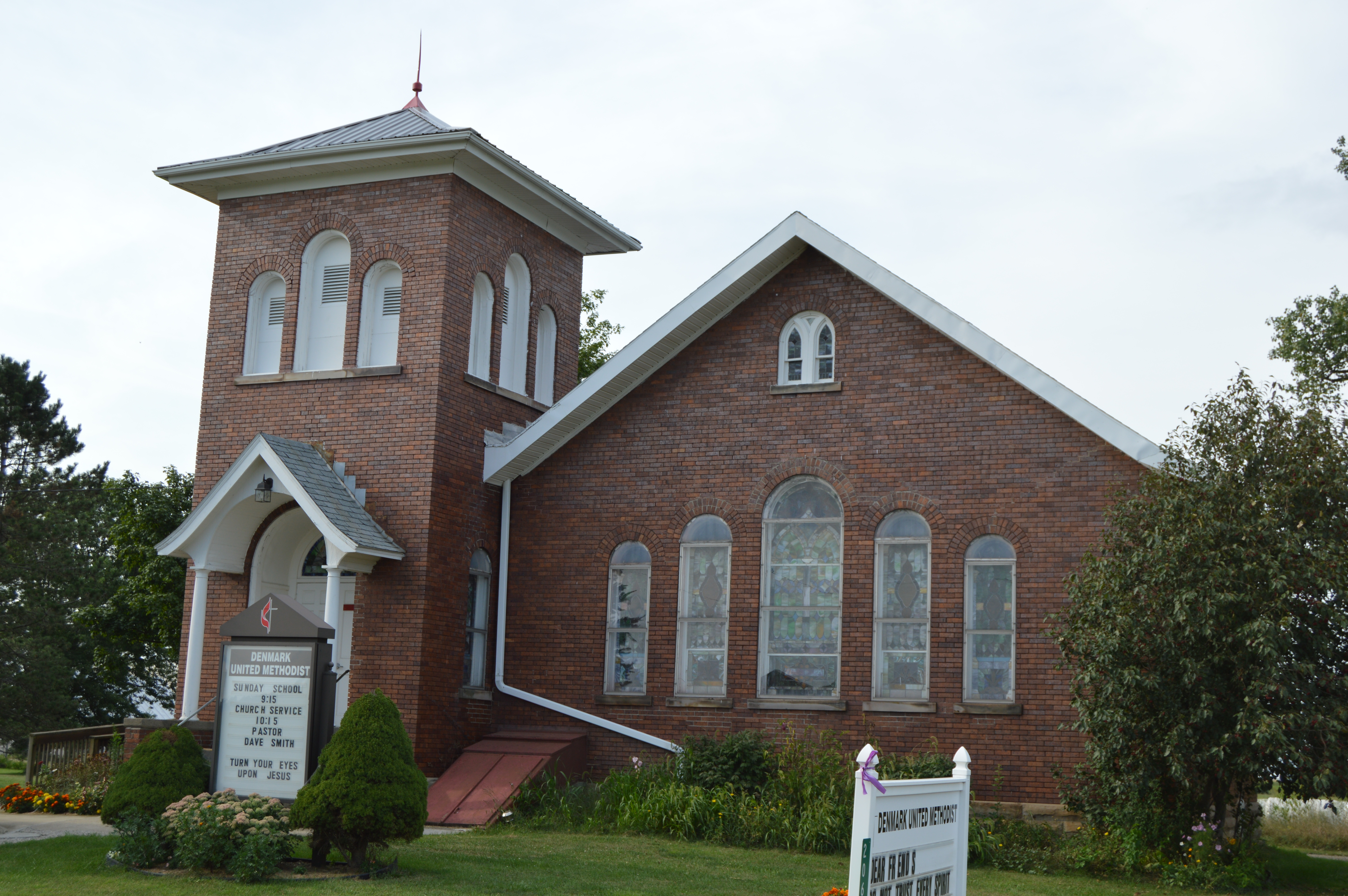
- Methodist church at Denmark

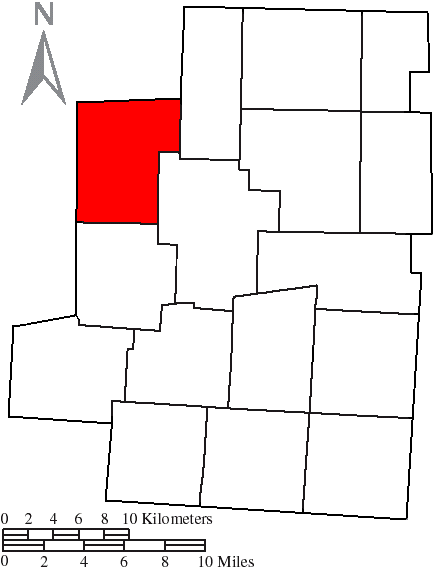
- Location of Canaan Township in Morrow County
- Coordinates: 40°36′31″N 82°54′33″W
- Country: United States
- State: Ohio
- County: Morrow

Area
  - Total: 27.5 sq mi (71.1 km^{2})
  - Land: 27.5 sq mi (71.1 km^{2})
  - Water: 0 sq mi (0.0 km^{2})
- Elevation: 1,024 ft (312 m)

Population (2020)
  - Total: 900
  - Density: 33/sq mi (13/km^{2})
- Time zone: UTC-5 (Eastern (EST))
  - Summer (DST): UTC-4 (EDT)
- FIPS code: 39-11248
- GNIS feature ID: 1086698
- Website: https://www.canaantwp.org/

Canaan Township is one of the sixteen townships of Morrow County, Ohio, United States. The 2020 census found 900 people in the township.

== Geography ==
Located in the northwestern part of the county, it borders the following townships:

- Tully Township, Marion County - north
- Washington Township - northeast
- Gilead Township - southeast
- Cardington Township - south
- Richland Township, Marion County - southwest corner
- Claridon Township, Marion County - west
- Scott Township, Marion County - northwest corner

No municipalities are located in Canaan Township.

== Name and history ==
Canaan Township was organized in 1817. The name alludes to the biblical Canaan. Statewide, other Canaan Townships are located in Athens, Madison, and Wayne counties.

== Government ==
The township is governed by a three-member board of trustees, who are elected in November of odd-numbered years to a four-year term beginning on the following January 1. Two are elected in the year after the presidential election and one is elected in the year before it. There is also an elected township fiscal officer, who serves a four-year term beginning on April 1 of the year after the election, which is held in November of the year before the presidential election. Vacancies in the fiscal officership or on the board of trustees are filled by the remaining trustees.
