= Morrow County, Ohio =

County in Ohio, United States

- County
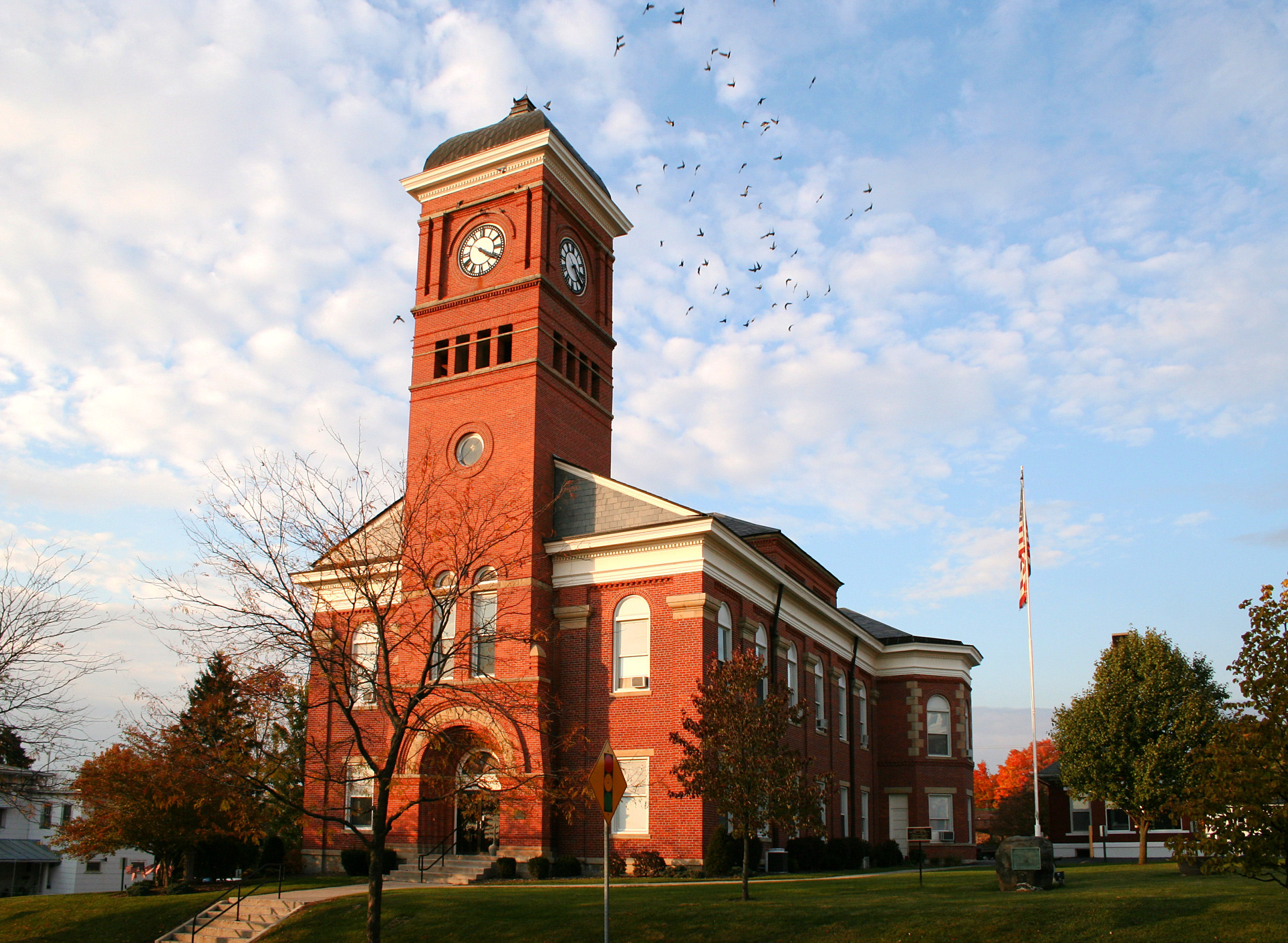
- Morrow County Courthouse

- Flag Seal

- Location within the U.S. state of Ohio
- Coordinates: 40°32′N 82°48′W
- Country: United States
- State: Ohio
- Founded: March 1, 1848
- Named for: Jeremiah Morrow
- Seat: Mount Gilead
- Largest village: Mount Gilead

Area
  - Total: 407 sq mi (1,050 km^{2})
  - Land: 406 sq mi (1,050 km^{2})
  - Water: 1.1 sq mi (2.8 km^{2}) 0.3%

Population (2020)
  - Total: 34,950
  - Estimate (2025): 36,305 ▲
  - Density: 89.4/sq mi (34.5/km^{2})
- Time zone: UTC−5 (Eastern)
  - Summer (DST): UTC−4 (EDT)
- Congressional district: 4th
- Website: www.morrowcountyohio.gov

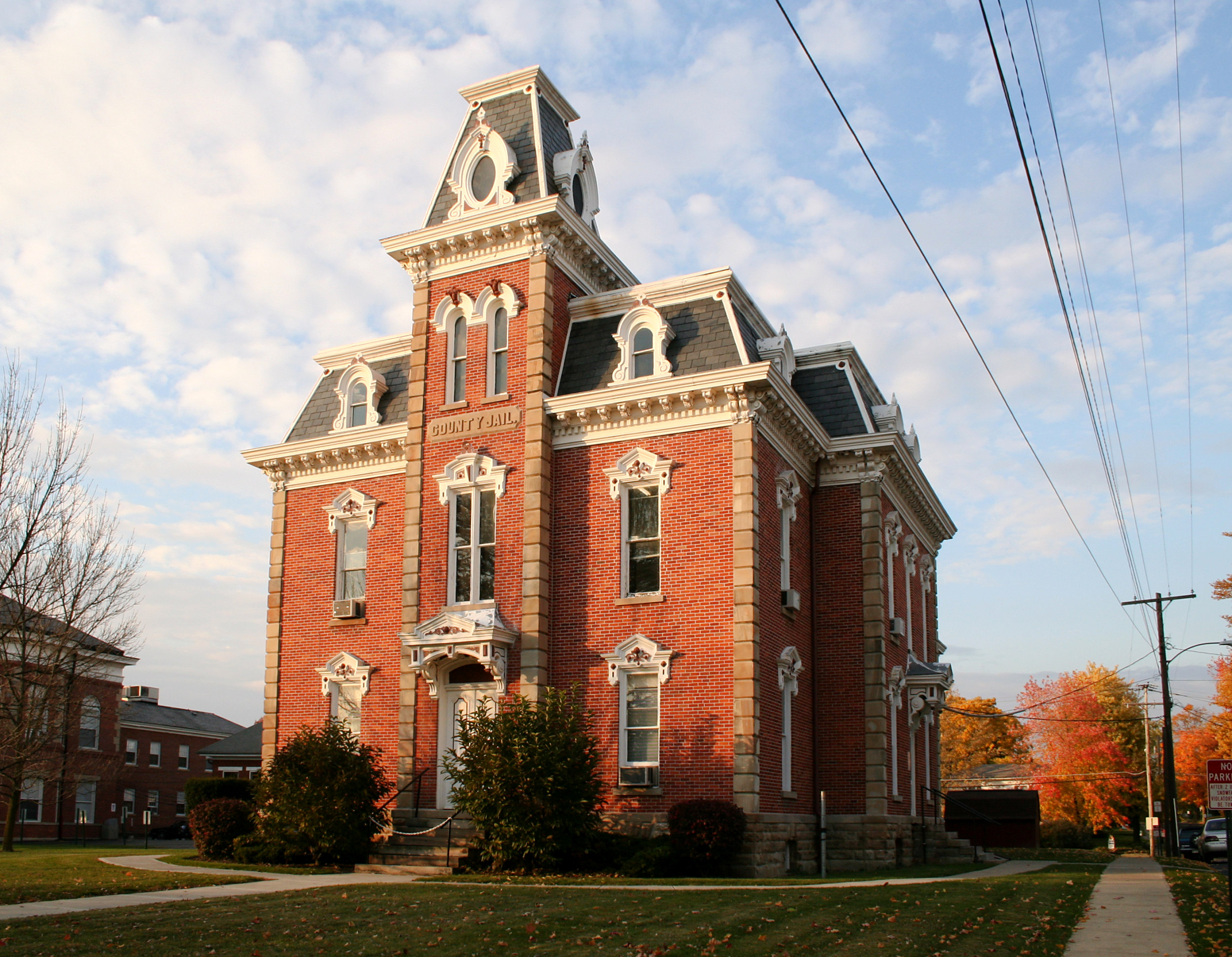
Old Morrow County Jail

Morrow County is a county located in the central portion of the U.S. state of Ohio. As of the 2020 census, the population was 34,950. Its county seat is Mount Gilead. The county was organized in 1848 from parts of four neighboring counties and named for Jeremiah Morrow who was the Governor of Ohio from 1822 to 1826. Shawnee people used the area for hunting purposes before white settlers arrived in the early 19th century. Morrow County is included in the Columbus, OH Metropolitan Statistical Area. In 2010, the center of population of Ohio was located in Morrow County, near the village of Marengo. Morrow County's historic World War I Victory Shaft, unique in the United States, is located in the center of downtown Mount Gilead. Other areas interesting to the tourist include: Mount Gilead State Park; Amish farms and businesses near Johnsville and Chesterville; the Mid-Ohio Sports Car Course near Steam Corners; the rolling Allegheny foothills of eastern Morrow County; the site of the birthplace of President Warren G. Harding near Blooming Grove; the site of the former Ohio Central College in Iberia; the early 19th-century architecture of buildings in Chesterville, Ohio; the Revolutionary War Soldiers' Memorial in Mount Gilead; the Civil War monument in Cardington; and the mid-19th-century architecture of the Morrow County Courthouse and Old Jail in Mount Gilead.

== Geography ==
According to the U.S. Census Bureau, the county has a total area of 407 square miles (1,050 km^{2}), of which 406 square miles (1,050 km^{2}) is land and 1.1 square miles (2.8 km^{2}) (0.3%) is water. Morrow County is considered to be a part of "Mid Ohio."

=== Adjacent counties ===
- Crawford County (north)
- Richland County (northeast)
- Knox County (southeast)
- Delaware County (southwest)
- Marion County (west)

=== Water features ===
Ossing Run is a tributary of Shaw Creek that flows through Morrow County.

== Demographics ==
Historical population
Census	Pop.	Note	%±
1850	20,280		—
1860	20,445		0.8%
1870	18,583		−9.1%
1880	19,072		2.6%
1890	18,120		−5.0%
1900	17,879		−1.3%
1910	16,815		−6.0%
1920	15,570		−7.4%
1930	14,489		−6.9%
1940	15,646		8.0%
1950	17,168		9.7%
1960	19,405		13.0%
1970	21,348		10.0%
1980	26,480		24.0%
1990	27,749		4.8%
2000	31,628		14.0%
2010	34,827		10.1%
2020	34,950		0.4%
2025 (est.)	36,305	▲	3.9%
U.S. Decennial Census; 1790-1960 1900-90; 1990-2000 2020 2025

=== Racial and ethnic composition ===
Morrow County, Ohio – Racial and ethnic composition Note: the US Census treats Hispanic/Latino as an ethnic category. This table excludes Latinos from the racial categories and assigns them to a separate category. Hispanics/Latinos may be of any race.
Race / Ethnicity (NH = Non-Hispanic)	Pop 1980	Pop 1990	Pop 2000	Pop 2010	Pop 2020	% 1980	% 1990	% 2000	% 2010	% 2020
White alone (NH)	26,285	27,504	30,984	33,772	32,773	99.26%	99.12%	97.96%	96.97%	93.77%
Black or African American alone (NH)	32	63	84	117	153	0.12%	0.23%	0.27%	0.34%	0.44%
Native American or Alaska Native alone (NH)	22	49	90	40	56	0.08%	0.18%	0.28%	0.11%	0.16%
Asian alone (NH)	29	38	46	84	90	0.11%	0.14%	0.15%	0.24%	0.26%
Native Hawaiian or Pacific Islander alone (NH)	x	x	1	9	8	x	x	0.00%	0.03%	0.02%
Other race alone (NH)	13	3	24	15	93	0.05%	0.01%	0.08%	0.04%	0.27%
Mixed race or Multiracial (NH)	x	x	216	410	1,197	x	x	0.68%	1.18%	3.42%
Hispanic or Latino (any race)	99	92	183	380	580	0.37%	0.33%	0.58%	1.09%	1.66%
Total	26,480	27,749	31,628	34,827	34,950	100.00%	100.00%	100.00%	100.00%	100.00%

=== 2020 census ===
As of the 2020 census, the county had a population of 34,950 and a median age of 42.7 years. 23.0% of residents were under the age of 18 and 18.6% of residents were 65 years of age or older, while there were 101.2 males for every 100 females and 100.1 males for every 100 females age 18 and over.

The racial makeup of the county was 94.2% White, 0.5% Black or African American, 0.3% American Indian and Alaska Native, 0.3% Asian, <0.1% Native Hawaiian and Pacific Islander, 0.7% from some other race, and 4.1% from two or more races. Hispanic or Latino residents of any race comprised 1.7% of the population.

<0.1% of residents lived in urban areas, while 100.0% lived in rural areas.

There were 13,334 households in the county, of which 30.5% had children under the age of 18 living in them. Of all households, 56.3% were married-couple households, 16.8% were households with a male householder and no spouse or partner present, and 19.2% were households with a female householder and no spouse or partner present. About 22.7% of all households were made up of individuals and 10.5% had someone living alone who was 65 years of age or older.

There were 14,472 housing units, of which 7.9% were vacant. Among occupied housing units, 80.5% were owner-occupied and 19.5% were renter-occupied. The homeowner vacancy rate was 1.7% and the rental vacancy rate was 5.6%.

=== 2010 census ===
As of the 2010 United States census, there were 34,827 people, 12,855 households, and 9,578 families living in the county. The population density was 85.8 inhabitants per square mile (33.1/km^{2}). There were 14,155 housing units at an average density of 34.9 units per square mile (13.5 units/km^{2}). The racial makeup of the county was 97.7% white, 0.3% Asian, 0.1% American Indian, 0.2% from other races, and 1.3% from two or more races. Those of Hispanic or Latino origin made up 1.1% of the population. In terms of ancestry, 30.8% were German, 16.1% were American, 14.4% were Irish, and 13.3% were English.

Of the 12,855 households, 35.1% had children under the age of 18 living with them, 59.5% were married couples living together, 9.5% had a female householder with no husband present, 25.5% were non-families, and 20.7% of all households were made up of individuals. The average household size was 2.68 and the average family size was 3.08. The median age was 39.5 years.

The median income for a household in the county was $49,891 and the median income for a family was $55,980. Males had a median income of $41,096 versus $32,911 for females. The per capita income for the county was $20,795. About 7.5% of families and 10.8% of the population were below the poverty line, including 13.9% of those under age 18 and 9.5% of those age 65 or over.

=== 2000 census ===
As of the census of 2000, there were 31,628 people, 11,499 households, and 8,854 families living in the county. The population density was 78 inhabitants per square mile (30/km^{2}). There were 12,132 housing units at an average density of 30 units per square mile (12/km^{2}). The racial makeup of the county was 98.37% White, 0.27% Black or African American, 0.30% Native American, 0.15% Asian, 0.18% from other races, and 0.74% from two or more races. 0.58% of the population were Hispanic or Latino of any race.

There were 11,499 households, out of which 35.60% had children under the age of 18 living with them, 64.60% were married couples living together, 8.10% had a female householder with no husband present, and 23.00% were non-families. 19.00% of all households were made up of individuals, and 7.90% had someone living alone who was 65 years of age or older. The average household size was 2.72 and the average family size was 3.09.

In the county, the population was spread out, with 27.30% under the age of 18, 7.60% from 18 to 24, 29.30% from 25 to 44, 24.30% from 45 to 64, and 11.50% who were 65 years of age or older. The median age was 36 years. For every 100 females there were 99.40 males. For every 100 females age 18 and over, there were 98.00 males.

The median income for a household in the county was $40,882, and the median income for a family was $45,747. Males had a median income of $33,129 versus $22,454 for females. The per capita income for the county was $17,830. About 6.60% of families and 9.00% of the population were below the poverty line, including 12.40% of those under age 18 and 7.10% of those age 65 or over.

== Politics ==
Morrow County is a Republican stronghold county. The last time it voted for a Democratic candidate was in 1964 when it voted for Lyndon B. Johnson.

United States presidential election results for Morrow County, Ohio
Year	Republican		Democratic		Third party(ies)	
Year	No.	%	No.	%	No.	%
1856	2,031	53.46%	1,667	43.88%	101	2.66%
1860	2,260	53.18%	1,928	45.36%	62	1.46%
1864	2,366	58.83%	1,656	41.17%	0	0.00%
1868	2,469	58.24%	1,770	41.76%	0	0.00%
1872	2,197	55.85%	1,689	42.93%	48	1.22%
1876	2,450	53.45%	2,046	44.63%	88	1.92%
1880	2,581	52.92%	2,143	43.94%	153	3.14%
1884	2,612	52.39%	2,160	43.32%	214	4.29%
1888	2,514	51.02%	2,068	41.97%	345	7.00%
1892	2,297	49.07%	1,958	41.83%	426	9.10%
1896	2,506	48.79%	2,517	49.01%	113	2.20%
1900	2,605	51.58%	2,278	45.11%	167	3.31%
1904	2,563	55.18%	1,827	39.33%	255	5.49%
1908	2,500	51.06%	2,239	45.73%	157	3.21%
1912	1,240	27.65%	1,880	41.92%	1,365	30.43%
1916	2,062	45.41%	2,345	51.64%	134	2.95%
1920	4,484	60.78%	2,858	38.74%	36	0.49%
1924	3,790	57.39%	2,379	36.02%	435	6.59%
1928	4,801	71.67%	1,818	27.14%	80	1.19%
1932	3,811	48.82%	3,849	49.31%	146	1.87%
1936	4,086	49.52%	3,947	47.83%	219	2.65%
1940	5,457	62.93%	3,215	37.07%	0	0.00%
1944	5,439	69.78%	2,356	30.22%	0	0.00%
1948	4,327	62.21%	2,616	37.61%	12	0.17%
1952	6,106	71.96%	2,379	28.04%	0	0.00%
1956	5,885	71.56%	2,339	28.44%	0	0.00%
1960	6,357	69.91%	2,736	30.09%	0	0.00%
1964	4,194	47.84%	4,572	52.16%	0	0.00%
1968	4,898	55.58%	2,405	27.29%	1,509	17.12%
1972	6,886	70.56%	2,527	25.89%	346	3.55%
1976	5,814	53.28%	4,870	44.63%	228	2.09%
1980	6,179	61.96%	3,239	32.48%	554	5.56%
1984	8,116	73.50%	2,839	25.71%	87	0.79%
1988	7,130	66.26%	3,515	32.67%	115	1.07%
1992	5,208	40.72%	3,907	30.54%	3,676	28.74%
1996	5,655	46.07%	4,627	37.69%	1,993	16.24%
2000	7,842	61.08%	4,529	35.28%	468	3.65%
2004	10,474	64.15%	5,775	35.37%	79	0.48%
2008	10,067	60.36%	6,177	37.03%	435	2.61%
2012	9,865	60.83%	5,933	36.59%	419	2.58%
2016	11,948	71.60%	3,761	22.54%	979	5.87%
2020	14,077	76.22%	4,048	21.92%	343	1.86%
2024	14,609	77.17%	4,100	21.66%	223	1.18%

United States Senate election results for Morrow County, Ohio1
Year	Republican		Democratic		Third party(ies)	
Year	No.	%	No.	%	No.	%
2024	13,197	71.20%	4,610	24.87%	727	3.92%

== Transportation ==
The Morrow County Airport is located two nautical miles (2.3 mi; 3.7 km) southwest of Mount Gilead's central business district.

== Communities ==
=== Cities ===
- Galion (part)

=== Villages ===
- Cardington
- Chesterville
- Edison
- Fulton
- Marengo
- Mount Gilead (county seat)
- Sparta

=== Townships ===
- Bennington
- Canaan
- Cardington
- Chester
- Congress
- Franklin
- Gilead
- Harmony
- Lincoln
- North Bloomfield
- Perry
- Peru
- South Bloomfield
- Troy
- Washington
- Westfield

=== Census-designated places ===
- Candlewood Lake
- Hidden Lakes
- Iberia

=== Unincorporated communities ===
- Bloomfield
- Blooming Grove
- Climax
- Denmark
- Fargo
- Johnsville
- North Woodbury
- Pagetown
- Pulaskiville
- Saint James
- Shawtown
- Shauck
- South Woodbury
- Steam Corners
- Vails Corners
- West Liberty
- West Point
- Westfield
- Williamsport

== Notable residents ==
- Chilton C. Baker, politician
- Tim Belcher, former Major League Baseball pitcher
- Richard Dillingham, Quaker abolitionist
- Frank W. Gunsaulus, pastor
- Warren G. Harding, U.S. President
- Dawn Powell, author
- Esther Tuttle Pritchard (1840–1900), minister, editor
- Samuel Newitt Wood, politician and women's rights advocate

== See also ==
- National Register of Historic Places listings in Morrow County, Ohio
