= National Register of Historic Places listings in Morrow County, Ohio =

Location of Morrow County in Ohio

This is a list of the National Register of Historic Places listings in Morrow County, Ohio.

This is intended to be a complete list of the properties and districts on the National Register of Historic Places in Morrow County, Ohio, United States. The locations of National Register properties and districts for which the latitude and longitude coordinates are included below, may be seen in a Google map.

There are 15 properties and districts listed on the National Register in the county. Another property was once listed but has been removed.

This National Park Service list is complete through NPS recent listings posted May 1, 2026.

== Current listings ==
	Name on the Register	Image	Date listed	Location	City or town	Description
1	Reuben Benedict House	Reuben Benedict House	May 8, 2000 (#00000419)	1463 County Road 24, west of Marengo; 40°24′29″N 82°51′48″W	Peru Township	
2	Samuel P. Brown House	Samuel P. Brown House	March 15, 1982 (#82003619)	South of Fulton on Worthington-New Haven Rd. 40°26′31″N 82°50′48″W	Lincoln Township	
3	Chester Town Hall	Chester Town Hall	August 21, 1979 (#79002752)	Sandusky and Short Sts. 40°28′48″N 82°40′57″W	Chesterville	
4	Chesterville Methodist Church	Chesterville Methodist Church	August 21, 1979 (#79002754)	Sandusky and East Sts. 40°28′46″N 82°40′54″W	Chesterville	
5	Floral Hall	Floral Hall	December 12, 1976 (#76001503)	Morrow County Fairgrounds; 40°32′39″N 82°49′52″W	Mount Gilead	
6	Jarvis House	Jarvis House	August 21, 1979 (#79002756)	77 S. Portland St. 40°28′44″N 82°41′00″W	Chesterville	
7	Levering Hall	Levering Hall	May 29, 1980 (#80003180)	12 S. Main St. 40°32′55″N 82°49′41″W	Mount Gilead	
8	Enos Miles House	Enos Miles House	August 21, 1979 (#79002758)	154 S. Portland St. 40°28′41″N 82°41′02″W	Chesterville	
9	Morrow County Courthouse and Jail	Morrow County Courthouse and Jail	July 25, 1974 (#74001586)	Courthouse Sq. 40°32′57″N 82°49′35″W	Mount Gilead	
10	Old Bartlett and Goble Store	Old Bartlett and Goble Store	August 21, 1979 (#79002748)	Sandusky and Portland Sts. 40°28′47″N 82°41′00″W	Chesterville	
11	Old Union School	Old Union School	August 21, 1979 (#79002743)	63 E. Denmon Ave. 40°28′51″N 82°40′56″W	Chesterville	
12	A.B. Sears House	A.B. Sears House	August 21, 1979 (#79002745)	52 W. Sandusky St. 40°28′49″N 82°41′07″W	Chesterville	
13	James S. Trimble House	James S. Trimble House	November 30, 1982 (#82001481)	187 Iberia St. 40°33′07″N 82°50′02″W	Mount Gilead	
14	U.S. Post Office	U.S. Post Office	August 21, 1979 (#79002750)	44 E. Sandusky St. 40°28′46″N 82°40′58″W	Chesterville	
15	Wood Commercial Building	Wood Commercial Building	August 21, 1979 (#79002747)	Sandusky and Portland Sts. 40°28′47″N 82°41′01″W	Chesterville	

== Former listing ==
	Name on the Register	Image	Date listed	Date removed	Location	City or town	Description
1	Exchange Hotel		July 13, 1979 (#79001907)	May 5, 1983	W. Main St. 40°28′47″N 82°41′01″W	Cardington	Destroyed by an F3 tornado on June 13, 1981.

== See also ==
- List of National Historic Landmarks in Ohio
- Listings in neighboring counties: Crawford, Delaware, Knox, Marion, Richland
- National Register of Historic Places listings in Ohio
