= Chesterville Community Church =

Historic church in Ohio, United States

- U.S. National Register of Historic Places
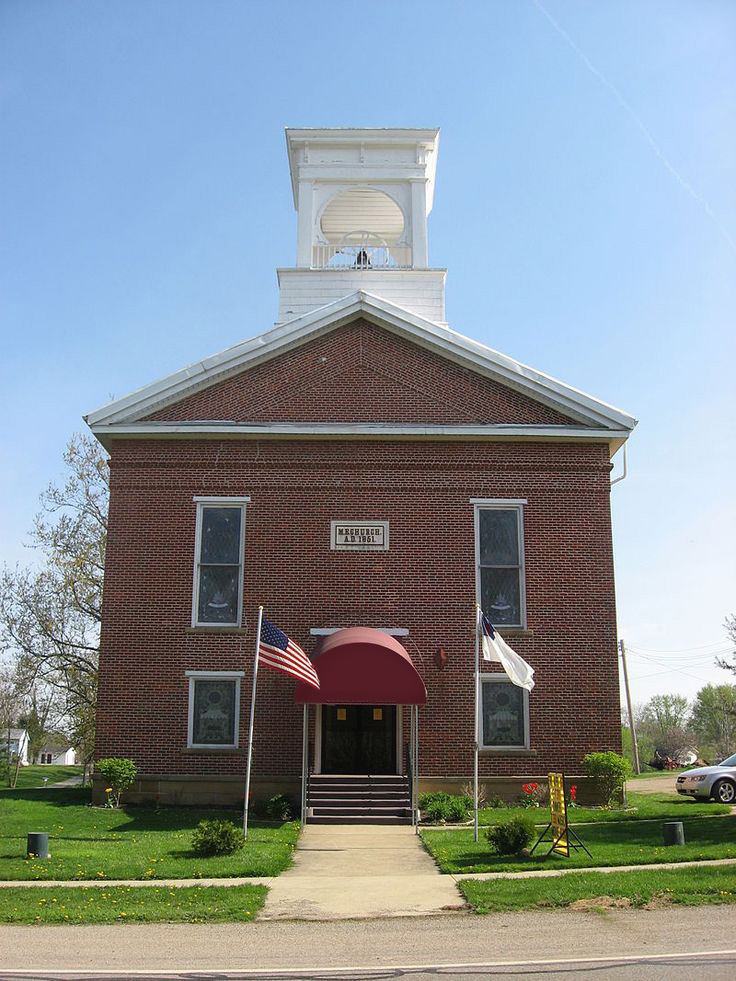
- Front of Chesterville Community Church

- Location within Ohio Location within the United States
- Location: Sandusky and East Sts., Chesterville, Ohio
- Coordinates: 40°28′46″N 82°40′54″W
- Area: Less than 1 acre (0.40 ha)
- Built: 1851
- Architectural style: Greek Revival
- MPS: Chesterville MRA
- NRHP reference No.: 79002754
- Added to NRHP: August 21, 1979

The Chesterville Community Church is an independent congregation in the Wesleyan tradition, located in the village of Chesterville, Ohio, United States. Founded in 1833, it is Chesterville's only church, and it worships in a landmark 1850s building. Constructed during the village's most prominent years, the building is one of the most significant structures anywhere in the community, and it has been named a historic site as an important part of the village's nineteenth-century built environment.

== Architecture ==
Built of brick on a foundation of sandstone, the Chesterville Community Church building is a Greek Revival structure covered with a metal roof and possessing exterior elements of wood. When originally built, the church measured 70 by 45 feet (21 m × 14 m). Today, the facade and side are both divided into three bays: two windows (one above the other) appear in each side bay and in the right and left bays of the facade, while the middle facade bay is pierced by an entry door with a datestone above it. Above the main part of the facade is a pediment, and a belfry crowns the building.

The church contains several beautiful historic stained glass windows, some dating back to the late 1800s. Several of these were damaged by an EF-1 tornado on June 13, 2022. They are restored as of June, 2023.

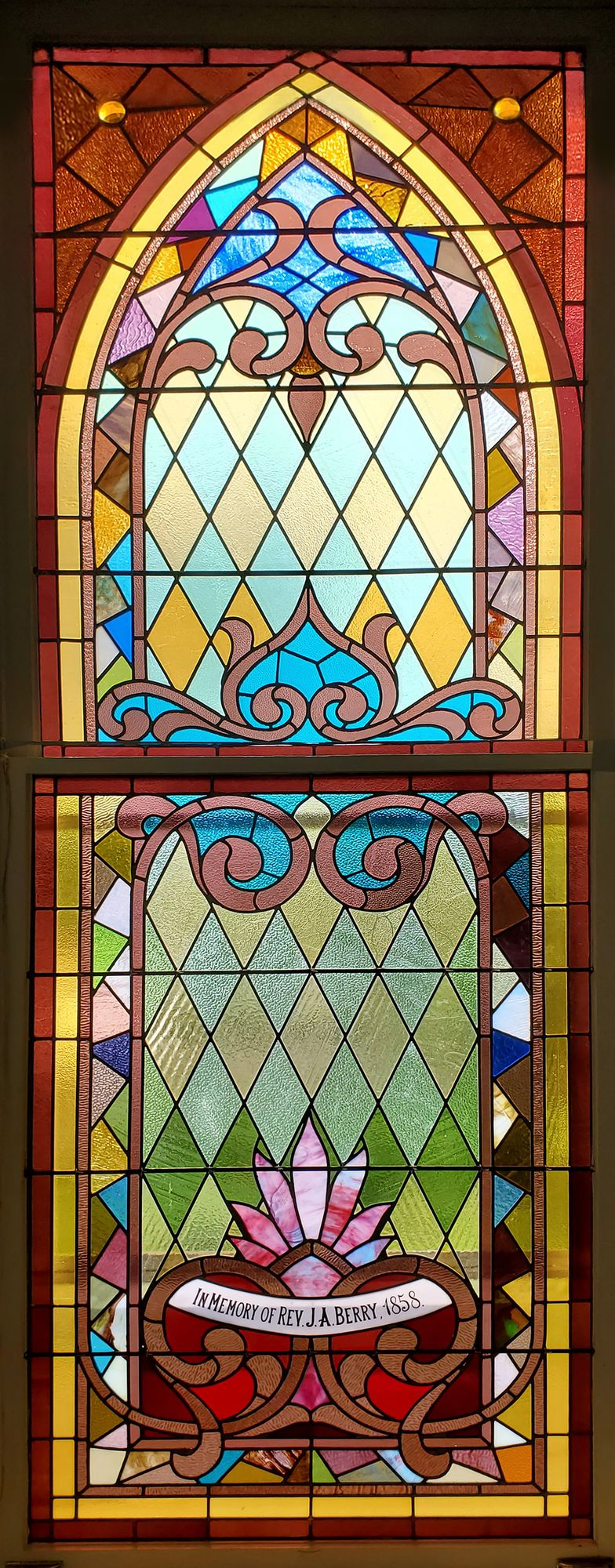
One of eight stained glass windows in the sanctuary of Chesterville Community Church, installed between 1891 - 1895.

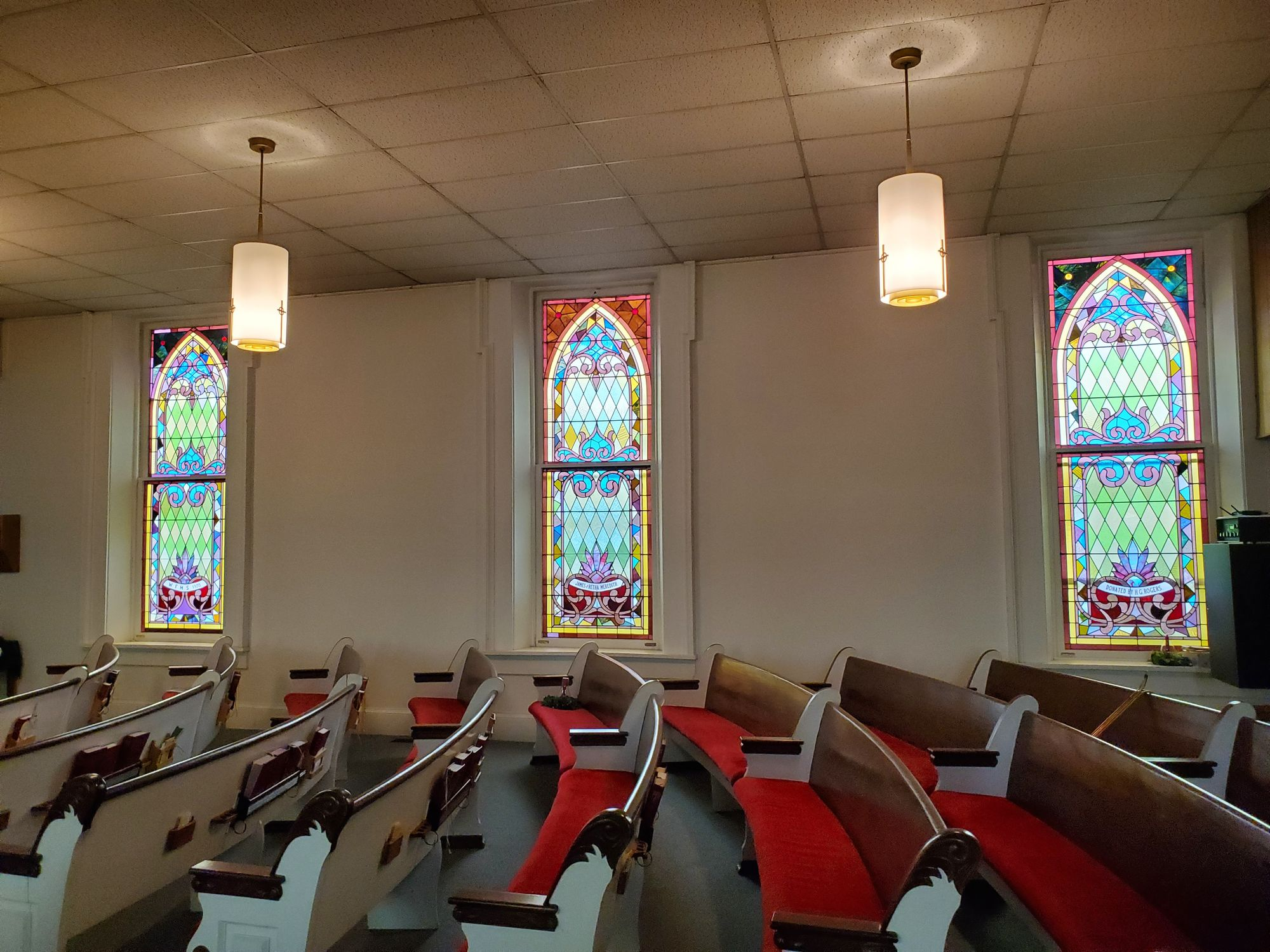
Sanctuary of Chesterville Community Church in Chesterville, Ohio showing some of the eight stained glass windows from the 1890s.

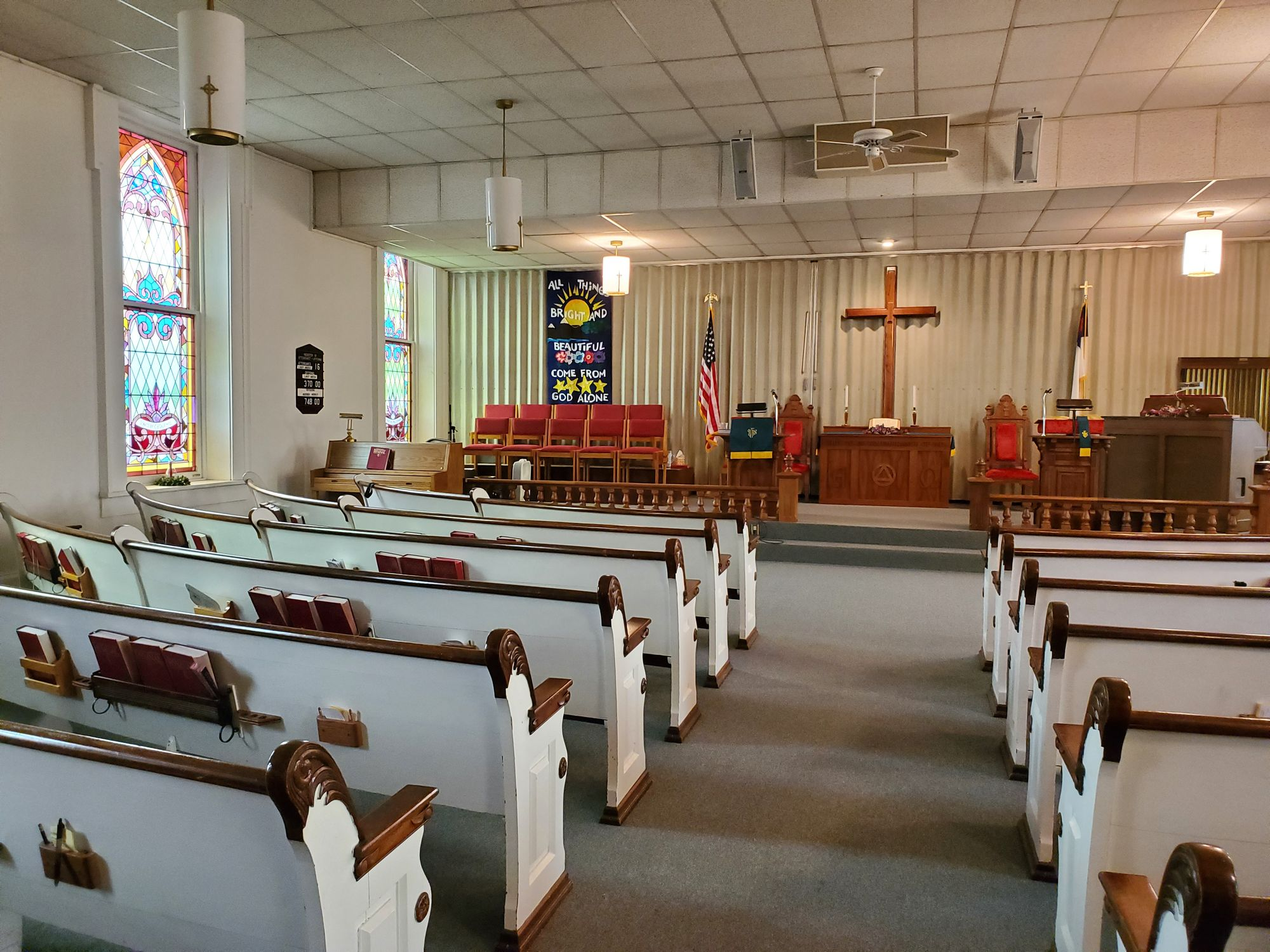
A view of the sanctuary of Chesterville Community Church with altar and some of the historic 1890's stained glass windows.

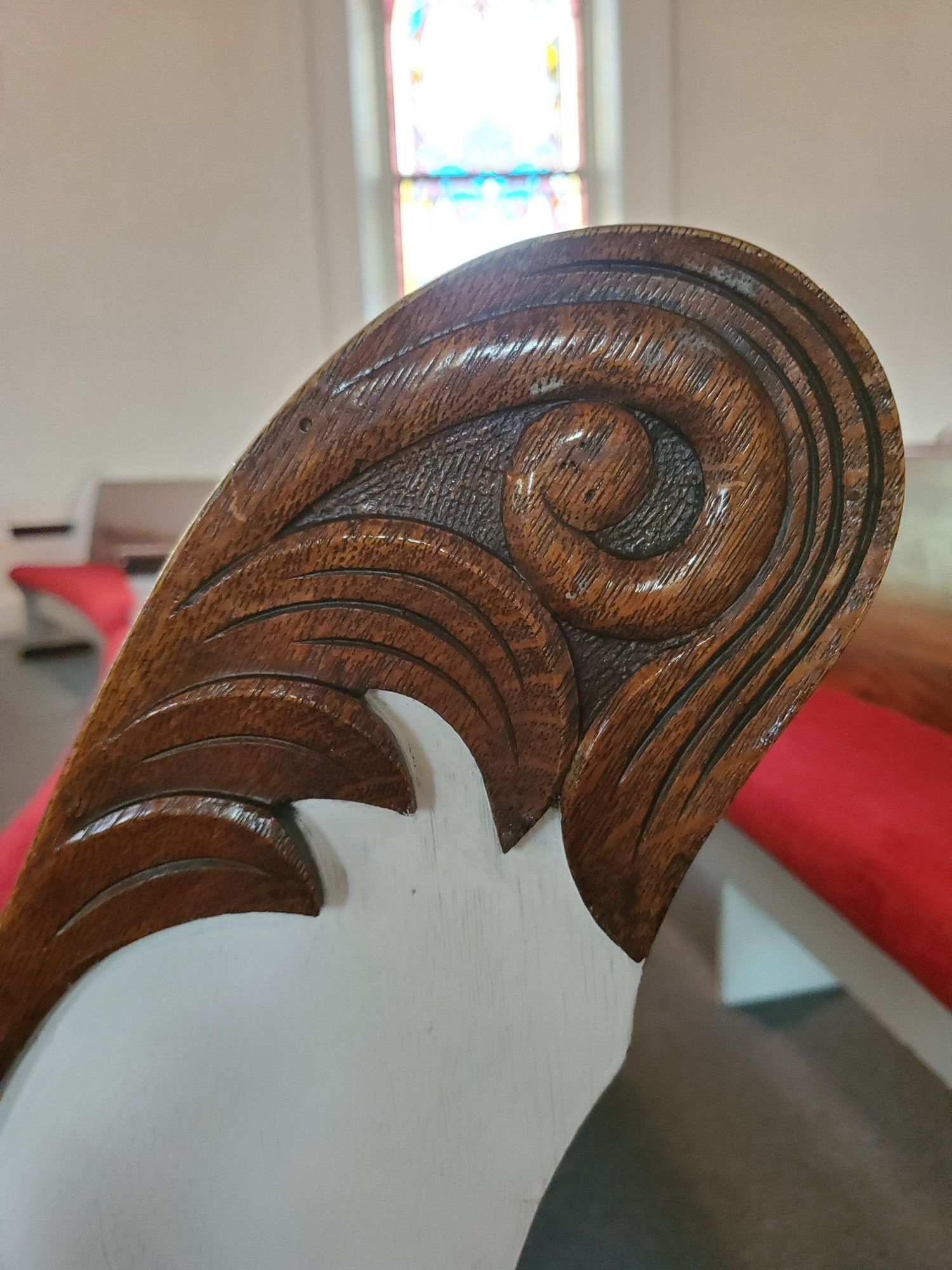
Detail of the hand carved scroll work at the end of the original oak pews in Chesterville Community Church.

== History ==
=== Organic ===
Chesterville's first church was a Primitive Baptist congregation, which was organized in 1816. The first Methodists in the vicinity of the present village gathered under the preaching of itinerant preachers in the late 1820s, and the first Methodist sermon in Chesterville itself was preached in 1833 by a minister who stayed overnight in the village while travelling from Mansfield to Columbus. A class was formed soon afterward, worshipping in an old schoolhouse, and the first minister was a Rev. McDowell. The congregation's earliest extant records date from July 1836. One year later, the first church building was erected at a cost of $1,200 in addition to $150 for the land. The congregation continued worshipping at this property until late 1850; they sold it in 1849 for $350 while retaining the right to use it for a year, and in later years, the building was converted into a school. The present church building was erected in 1851 at a cost of several thousand dollars; it was several years before the congregation struggled out of debt, but in the end they secured a building suitable for their own purposes for many generations. Lying behind the church building is a cemetery, which was established circa 1837. Although the Baptists lasted for many years, and although a PCUSA congregation was formed in Chesterville in 1845, Chesterville Community Church is now the only extant church in the village limits.

In 2023, the church was renamed Chesterville Community Church and became an independent congregation in the Wesleyan tradition.

=== Community ===
Chesterville's earliest years, late in the first half of the nineteenth century, were highly prosperous; numerous private schools and a prominent textile manufacturing company were established there. Its decline began in the late 1840s: several area communities united to fight for the creation of a separate county but fought each other for the title of county seat, and when Mount Gilead was chosen for this position instead of Chesterville, the town stagnated as both government and railroads concentrated on Mount Gilead. This combination of early prosperity and later stagnation is responsible for the present existence of the Methodist Church and numerous other Greek Revival buildings in the village: a building boom occurred early in its history, and neither finances nor necessity permitted the construction of newer buildings in later years.

== Preservation ==
During the 1970s, a community group known as Chester Community Concerns was formed to encourage preservation of the village's historic architecture. In 1978, the group sponsored a project to record the village's historic buildings with the Ohio Historic Inventory, a historic preservation survey, with the goal of nominating the most important historic properties for inclusion on the National Register of Historic Places. Using the multiple property submission process, nine Chesterville buildings were added to the Register in August 1979: the Chester Township Hall, the Methodist Church, the Jarvis and Enos Miles Houses on Portland Street, the Old Union School, the Post Office and the A.B. Sears House on Sandusky Street, and the Old Bartlett and Goble Store and a Wood Commercial Building at the village's main intersection. The Methodist Church qualified both because of its well-preserved historic architecture and because of its place in local history: it was deemed the village's most important architectural landmark, and its location on State Route 95 on the village's east side makes it one of the village's most prominent buildings, contributing greatly to Chesterville's continued appearance as a nineteenth-century trading center.
