= Chester Town Hall (disambiguation) =

Chester Town Hall may refer to:

in England

- Chester Town Hall, in Chester, Cheshire

in the United States

- Bear Valley Grange Hall, now the township hall for Chester Township, Wabasha County, Minnesota
- Chester Town Hall (Chesterville, Ohio) in Chester Township, Morrow County, Ohio
