= South Bloomfield =

South Bloomfield is the name of the following places in Ohio:

- South Bloomfield, Ohio - a village in Pickaway County, Ohio
- South Bloomfield Township, Ohio - a township in Morrow County, Ohio
