= Levering =

Levering may refer to:

== People ==
- Levering (surname)

== Places ==
- Levering, Michigan, United States
- Levering Hall, Ohio, United States
- Levering Mission, Oklahoma, United States

== Other ==
- Levering Act, California, United States
- William Levering School, currently known as AMY Northwest Middle School
