= Morrow County Courthouse =

Morrow County Courthouse may refer to:

- Morrow County Courthouse (Ohio)
- Morrow County Courthouse (Oregon)
