= Chester Town Hall (Chesterville, Ohio) =

- U.S. National Register of Historic Places
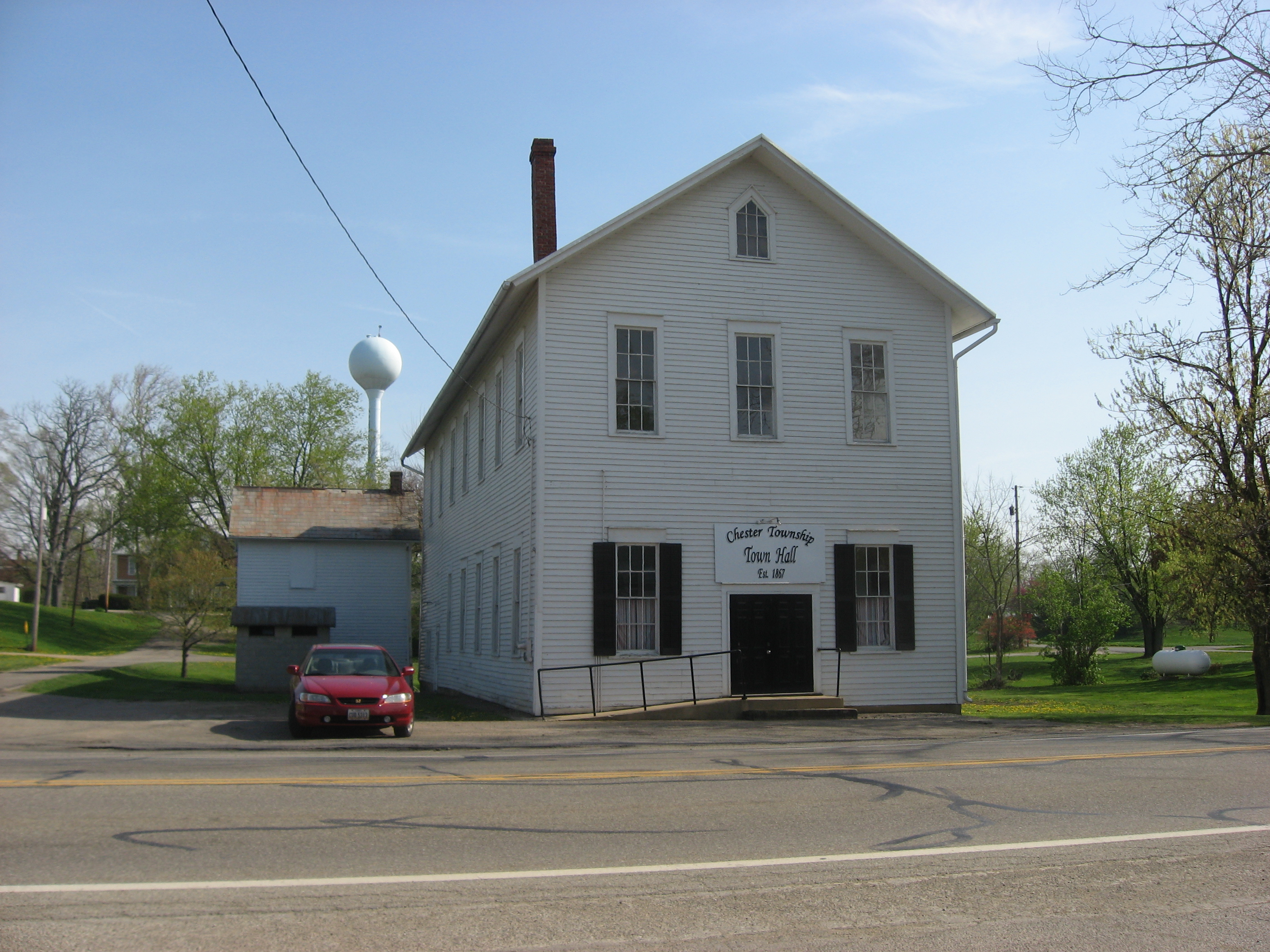
- Front and western side

- Location within Ohio Location within the United States
- Location: Sandusky and South Sts., Chesterville, Ohio
- Coordinates: 40°28′48″N 82°40′57″W
- Area: Less than 1 acre (0.40 ha)
- Built: 1867
- MPS: Chesterville MRA
- NRHP reference No.: 79002752
- Added to NRHP: August 21, 1979

The Chester Town Hall is a historic governmental building and community meeting place in the village of Chesterville, Ohio, United States. Built in the 1860s by the village and a fraternal society, it has served as home for both entities throughout its history, as well as providing space for Chester Township officials and community gatherings. Along with numerous other buildings in the village, it has been named a historic site.

== Community history ==
The vicinity of Chesterville was one of the first-settled parts of Knox County, as pioneers began arriving soon after 1803, and Chester Township was created in 1812, but the advance of civilization was slow; only after the conclusion of the War of 1812 did the area begin to prosper. Merchant Enos Miles, who moved to the township in 1815, platted the village of Chester in 1830. During its first decades, the village prospered; multiple schools were established, and numerous grand Greek Revival buildings lined the streets, but Chesterville lost to Mount Gilead in its attempt to be named the county seat when Morrow County was established in the 1850s, and Chesterville withered as the Cleveland, Columbus, Cincinnati and Indianapolis Railway built through Mount Gilead. The village was incorporated in 1860.

== Building history ==
Among the community organizations active in Chesterville was Lodge 204 of the Independent Order of Odd Fellows, organized in 1852. Prosperous within a few years of its establishment, the lodge soon owned its own hall, and in 1867 the members joined with the village and helped to construct the town hall, the upper story of which the lodge constructed at a cost of $1,200. Besides serving as a place for village officials to meet, the hall served as a community center; in 1880, the residents debated adding a stage and scenery, using money obtained from railroad taxes, and it ended up serving as a music performance venue for part of its history. In later years, the building also became home to Chester Township officials.

== Architecture ==
Built on a foundation of sandstone, the Town Hall is a weatherboarded structure with a metal roof pierced by a single chimney. Two and a half stories tall, the narrow facade and rear rise to gables, while the sides are substantially longer than the ends. Fourteen side windows are present in seven bays, while the facade features six sash windows in three bays: a small window in the gable, one in each second-story bay, and one in each end bay on the first story, while the double doors of the main entrance occupy the middle of the first story. Shutters are provided for the windows in the first story of the facade.

== Preservation ==
During the 1970s, a community group known as Chester Community Concerns was formed to encourage preservation of the village's historic architecture. In 1978, the group sponsored a project to record the village's historic buildings with the Ohio Historic Inventory, a historic preservation survey, with the goal of nominating the most important historic properties for inclusion on the National Register of Historic Places. Using the multiple property submission process, nine Chesterville buildings were added to the Register in August 1979: the town hall, the Methodist Church, the Jarvis and Enos Miles Houses on Portland Street, the Old Union School, the post office and the A.B. Sears House on Sandusky Street, and the Old Bartlett and Goble Store and an unnamed commercial building at the village's main intersection. The town hall qualified both because of its well-preserved historic architecture and because of its place in local history.
