= Harmony Township, Ohio =

Harmony Township, Ohio, may refer to:

- Harmony Township, Clark County, Ohio
- Harmony Township, Morrow County, Ohio
