= Levering (surname) =

Levering is a surname derived from the baptismal name Loefhere, ultimately from the Old English word Leofhering meaning beloved warriors. It is most prevalent in the United States. The surname Levering was first found in Surrey where they held a family seat from early times. The first records of the Levering family appear on the census rolls taken by the early Kings of Britain to determine the rate of taxation of their subjects.

Notable people with this surname include:

- Horatio Gates Levering Jones (1822–1893), State senator for Pennsylvania from 1874 to 1881. Secretary and later Vice President of the Historical Society of Pennsylvania, Moravian Historical Society, American Antiquarian Society, and the Historical Societies of New York, Pennsylvania, among others. Published The Levering Family in 1858.
- Colonel John Levering, U.S.V. (born Philadelphia, PA 1826 – died 1901, Virginia), prominent Philadelphian landowner. Director of First National Bank, and a member of the State Board of Agriculture. Appointed by President Lincoln to serve in the Cheat Mountain (Va.) campaign.
- Joshua Levering (1846–1935), American presidential candidate (1896), president of the trustees of The Southern Baptist Theological Seminary
- Harold K. Levering (1894–1967), American politician and a member of the California State Assembly
- Vice Admiral Levering Smith (1910–1993), United States Navy Admiral
- Robert W. Levering (1914–1989), American politician
- David Levering Lewis (born 1936), American historian
- Arthur Levering (born 1953), American composer
- Kate Levering (born 1979), American actress
- Jeff Levering, Milwaukee Brewers broadcaster

== See also ==
- Levering (disambiguation)
