= Chester Township, Ohio =

Chester Township, Ohio, may refer to:

- Chester Township, Clinton County, Ohio
- Chester Township, Geauga County, Ohio
- Chester Township, Meigs County, Ohio
- Chester Township, Morrow County, Ohio
- Chester Township, Wayne County, Ohio
