= James S. Trimble House =

Historic house in Ohio, United States

- U.S. National Register of Historic Places
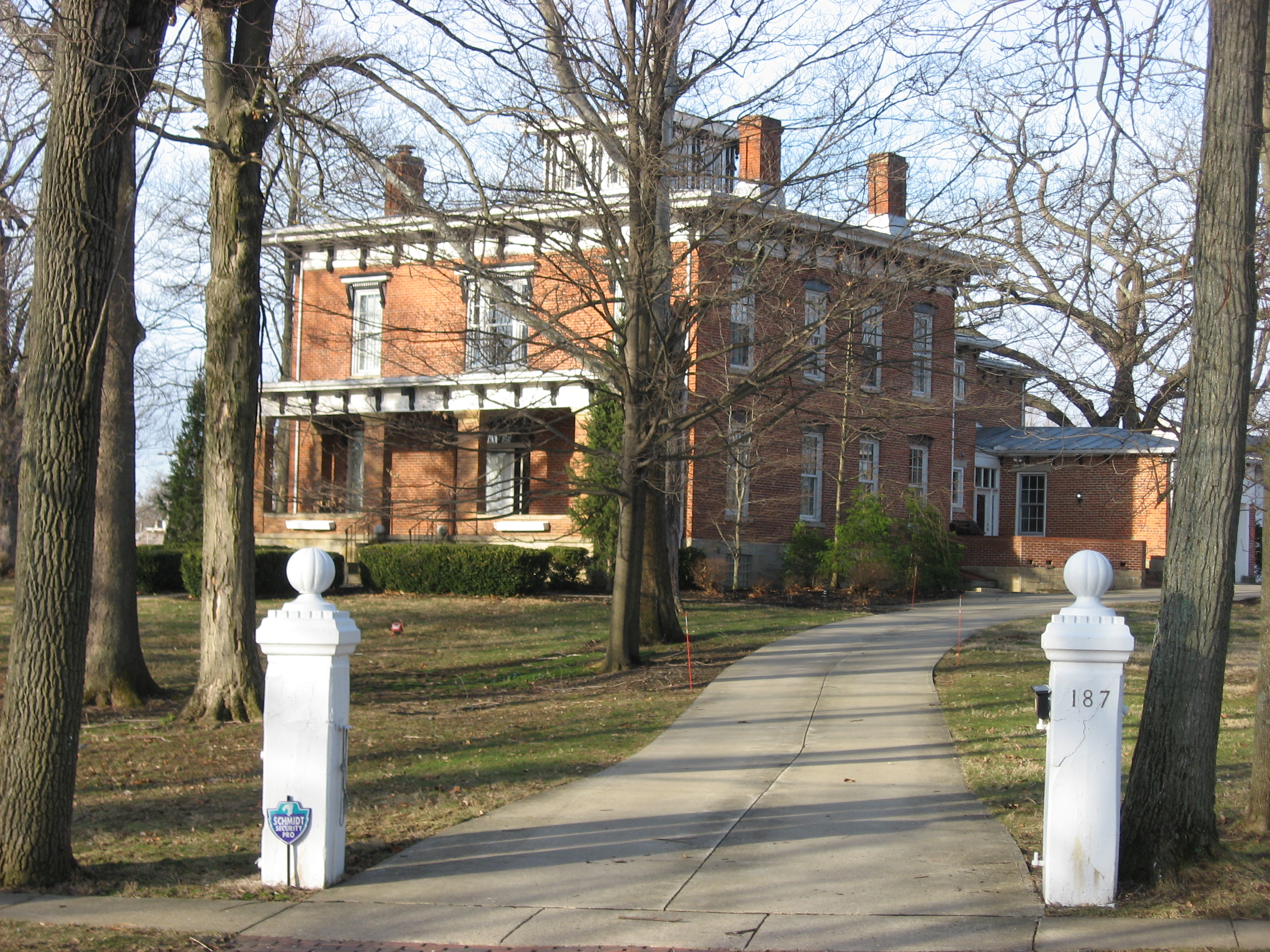
- Driveway view of the house

- Location within Ohio Location within the United States
- Location: 187 Iberia St., Mount Gilead, Ohio
- Coordinates: 40°33′7″N 82°50′2″W
- Area: 4 acres (1.6 ha)
- Architect: Miller & Smith
- Architectural style: Italianate
- NRHP reference No.: 82001481
- Added to NRHP: November 30, 1982

The James S. Trimble House is a historic residence in the village of Mount Gilead, Ohio, United States. The most significant house in the village, it was built in the middle of the nineteenth century, and it has been designated a historic site.

Born in 1818 in Mount Vernon into one of the area's pioneer families, Trimble was a merchant in Mount Gilead, operating a shop on Main Street by 1848. Finding his wealth growing, Trimble paid less attention to his dry goods store, opening a warehouse and becoming involved in selling grain in the nearby village of Edison; as time passed, he also formed a bank.

Possessed of a large lot along Iberia Street in Mount Gilead, Trimble chose to build his house on the property in 1853. Constructed of brick, and designed by the architectural firm of Miller and Smith, it is the largest and most elaborate house in the village, due largely to its unusually high degree of preservation. Few ornate Italianate houses built before the Civil War remain in the area, and the large lot makes the house even more prominent in Mount Gilead, one of Ohio's smallest county seats. Trimble lived in the house for twenty-five years; in April 1878, his investments in other businesses proved ruinous when those businesses failed, and he was forced to sell the house in his bankruptcy. For many years after this event, it was the home of Perry Cook and his family; they sold it to another family in the 1940s, and it was purchased from that family by the local Presbyterian church in 1982.

In 1982, the James S. Trimble House was listed on the National Register of Historic Places, qualifying because of its historically significant architecture. Fully 4 acres (1.6 ha) of land were designated as historic, and five different buildings in this area qualified as contributing properties. Trimble's home is one of four Mount Gilead properties to have received this distinction, and one of fifteen countywide.
