= Bennington Township, Morrow County, Ohio =

Township in Ohio, US

- Township
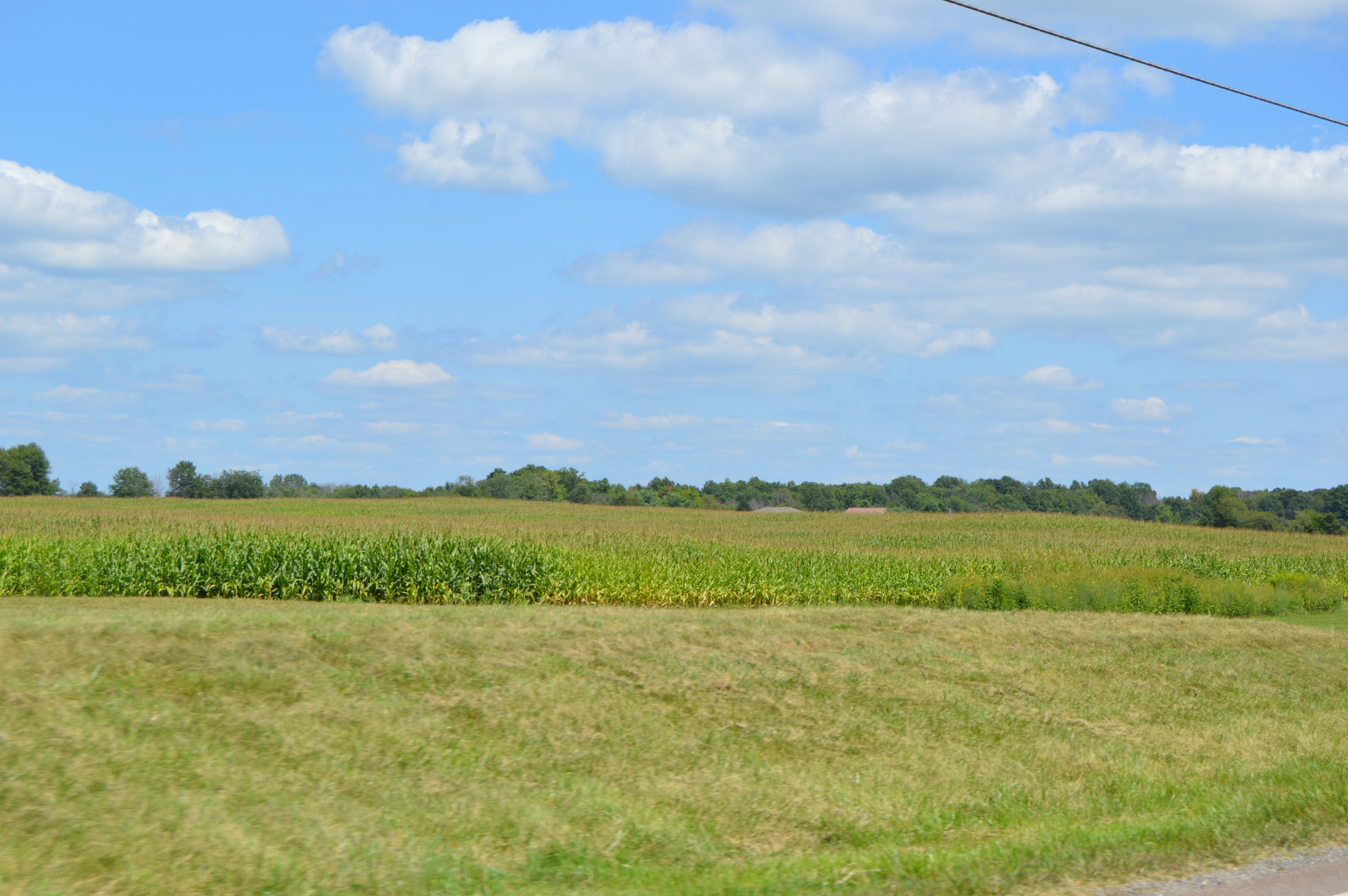
- Fields east of Marengo

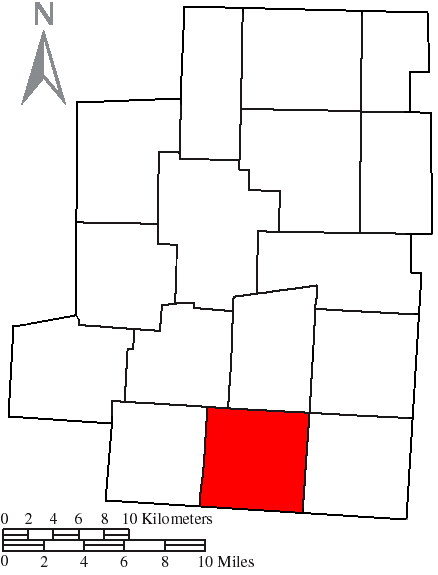
- Location of Bennington Township in Morrow County
- Coordinates: 40°23′3″N 82°47′41″W
- Country: United States
- State: Ohio
- County: Morrow

Area
  - Total: 25.3 sq mi (65.4 km^{2})
  - Land: 25.3 sq mi (65.4 km^{2})
  - Water: 0.039 sq mi (0.1 km^{2})
- Elevation: 1,180 ft (360 m)

Population (2020)
  - Total: 3,297
  - Density: 131/sq mi (50.4/km^{2})
- Time zone: UTC-5 (Eastern (EST))
  - Summer (DST): UTC-4 (EDT)
- FIPS code: 39-05508
- GNIS feature ID: 1086697

Bennington Township is one of the sixteen townships of Morrow County, Ohio, United States. The 2020 census found 3,297 people in the township, 283 of whom lived in the village of Marengo.

== Geography ==
Located in the southern part of the county, it borders the following townships:

- Harmony Township - north
- Chester Township - northeast corner
- South Bloomfield Township - east
- Hilliar Township, Knox County - southeast corner
- Porter Township, Delaware County - south
- Kingston Township, Delaware County - southwest corner
- Peru Township - west
- Lincoln Township - northwest

The village of Marengo is located in northwestern Bennington Township.

== Name and history ==
Bennington Township was organized in 1817, and named after Bennington, Vermont, the native home of a first settler. Statewide, the only other Bennington Township is located in Licking County.

== Government ==
The township is governed by a three-member board of trustees, who are elected in November of odd-numbered years to a four-year term beginning on the following January 1. Two are elected in the year after the presidential election and one is elected in the year before it. There is also an elected township fiscal officer, who serves a four-year term beginning on April 1 of the year after the election, which is held in November of the year before the presidential election. Vacancies in the fiscal officership or on the board of trustees are filled by the remaining trustees.
