= Chester Township, Morrow County, Ohio =

Township in Ohio, US

- Township
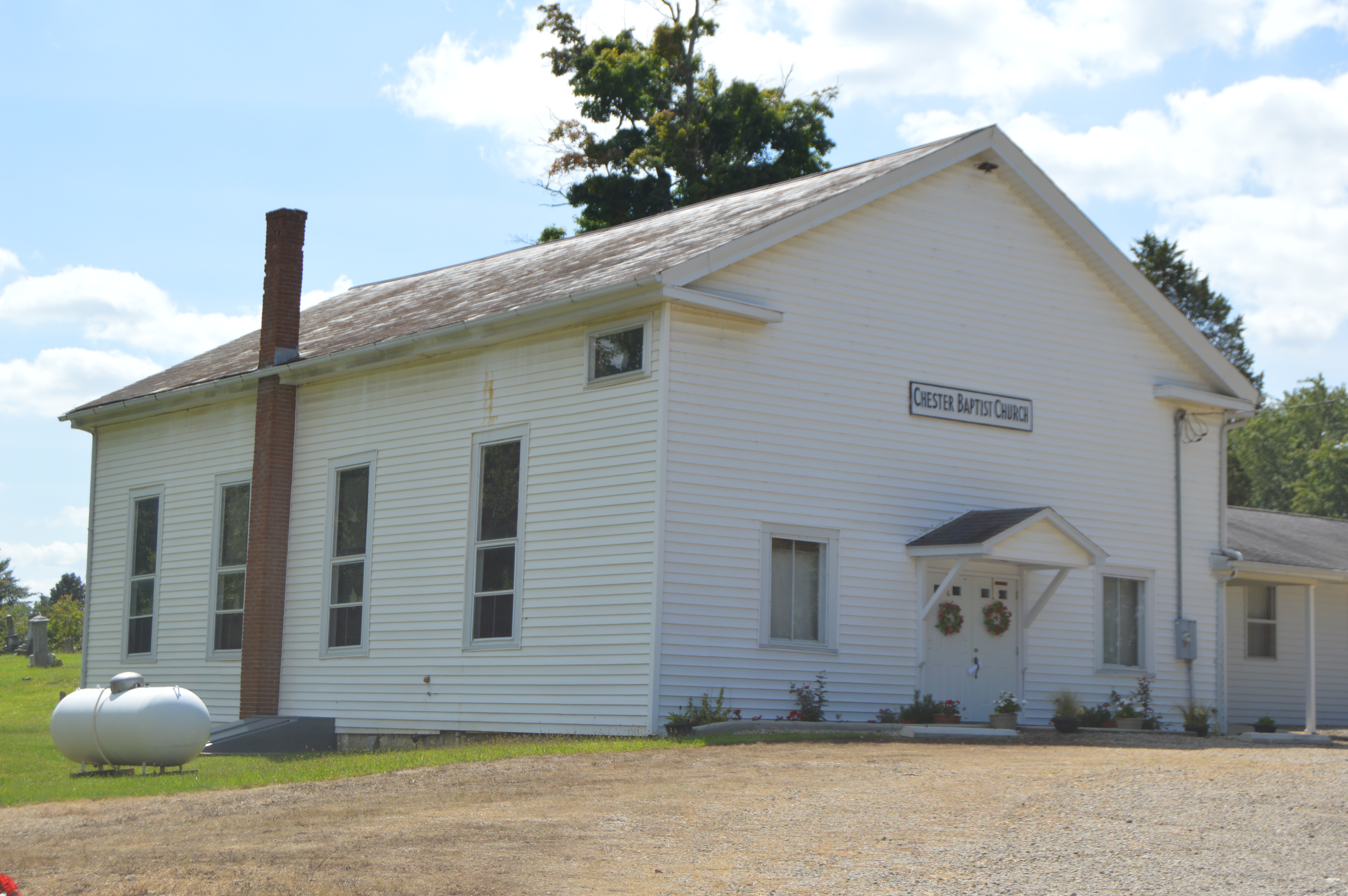
- Chester Baptist Church, south of Chesterville

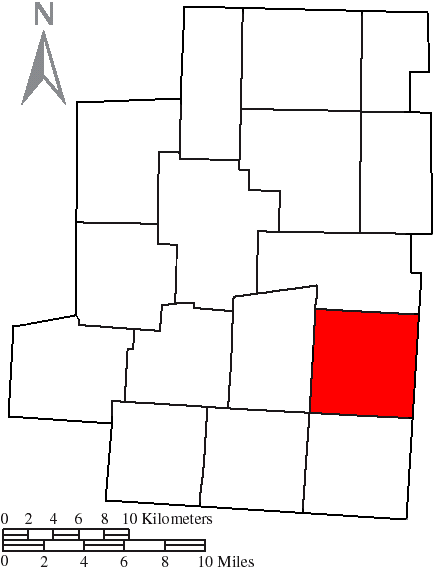
- Location of Chester Township in Morrow County
- Coordinates: 40°27′30″N 82°41′16″W
- Country: United States
- State: Ohio
- County: Morrow

Area
  - Total: 26.4 sq mi (68.5 km^{2})
  - Land: 26.4 sq mi (68.4 km^{2})
  - Water: 0.039 sq mi (0.1 km^{2})
- Elevation: 1,122 ft (342 m)

Population (2020)
  - Total: 1,851
  - Density: 70.1/sq mi (27.1/km^{2})
- Time zone: UTC-5 (Eastern (EST))
  - Summer (DST): UTC-4 (EDT)
- FIPS code: 39-14030
- GNIS feature ID: 1086700

Chester Township is one of the sixteen townships in Morrow County, Ohio, United States. The 2020 census reported a population of 1,851 people in the township, with 191 residing in the village of Chesterville.

== Geography ==
Located in the southeastern part of the county, it borders the following townships:

- Franklin Township - north
- Middlebury Township, Knox County - northeast corner
- Wayne Township, Knox County - east
- Liberty Township, Knox County - southeast corner
- South Bloomfield Township - south
- Bennington Township - southwest corner
- Harmony Township - west

The village of Chesterville is located in northern Chester Township.

== Name and history ==
Chester Township was organized in 1812. This township was named after Chester County, Pennsylvania, which was the native home of some of the first settlers. It is one of five Chester Townships statewide.

== Government ==
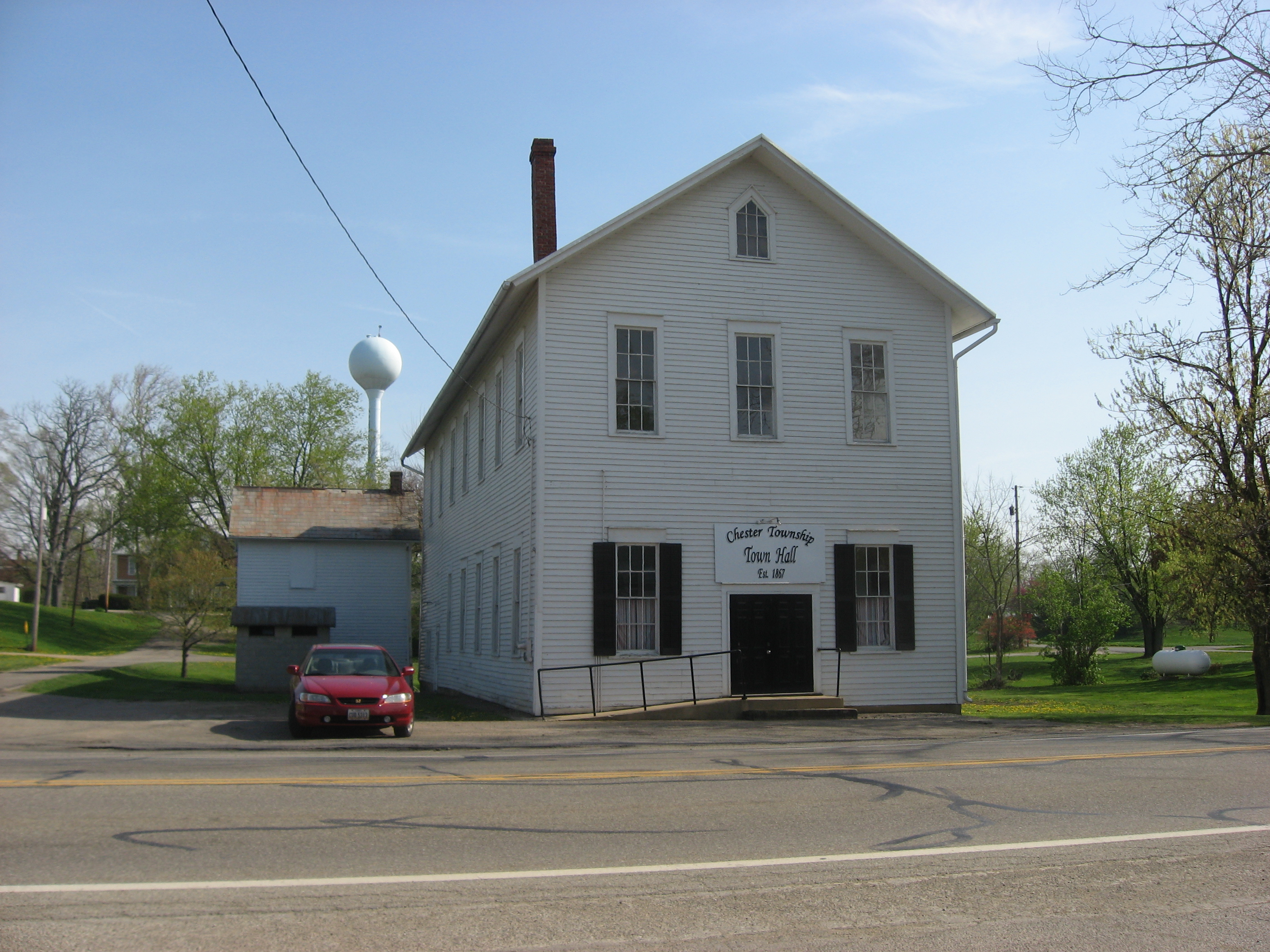
Chester Town Hall

The township is governed by a three-member board of trustees, elected in November of odd-numbered years to a four-year term beginning on January 1 of the following year. Two trustees are elected in the year after the presidential election, while one is elected in the year before it. Additionally, there is an elected towonship fiscal officer, who serves a four-year term beginning on April 1 of the year following the election, which takes place in November of the year before the presidential election. Vacancies in the fiscal officership or on the board of trustees are filled by the remaining trustees.
