= Merrill Gilfillan =

American poet

Merrill Daniel Gilfillan (born 14 May 1945) is an American writer of poetry, short fiction, and essays.

== Life and work ==
Gilfillan was born and raised in Mount Gilead, Ohio, where his outdoorsman father (Merrill C. Gilfillan) worked as a naturalist for the state's Department of Natural Resources and helped inspire an early fascination with the natural world and its creatures. Gilfillan graduated in 1967 from the University of Michigan. He attended the University of Iowa Writer's Workshop for two years, studying with Ted Berrigan, Anselm Hollo, and George Starbuck, among others. He lived and worked in New York City for eight years and then moved to Colorado, which served as a base for frequent expeditions to the Great Plains and other regions of America from which he reports in essays, poetry, and short stories. He now lives in Asheville, North Carolina.

== Books ==
Poetry

- Truck, Angel Hair Books, New York, 1970
- 9:15, Doones Press, Bowling Green, OH, 1970
- Skyliner, Blue Wind Press, Berkeley, 1974
- To Creature, Blue Wind Press, Berkeley, 1975
- Light Years: Selected Early Poems, Blue Wind Press, Berkeley, 1977
- River through Rivertown, The Figures, Great Barrington, MA, 1982
- Coppers and Blues, Plum Pit, Boulder, 1997
- On Heart River, Dayo, Denver, 1995
- Satin Street, Moyer Bell, Wakefield, RI, 1997
- The Seasons, Adventures in Poetry, New York | Boston, 2002
- Small Weathers, Qua Books, Jamestown, RI, 2004
- Undanceable, Flood Editions, Chicago, 2005
- Selected Poems 1965-2000, Adventures in Poetry, New York & Boston 2005 ISBN 0-9761612-2-2
- The Bark of the Dog, Flood Editions, Chicago, 2010 ISBN 978-0-9819520-5-5
- Harpsichord Hills, Horse Less Press, Grand Rapids, MI, 2013
- Red Mavis, Flood Editions, Chicago 2014 ISBN 978-0-9838893-7-3
- Would-be Dogwood, Shirt Pocket Press Grand Rapids, MI, 2017
- Old River, New River, Red Dragonfly Press, Northfield, MN, 2019 ISBN 978-1-945063-25-1
- Three Roans in the Shallows, One of Them Blue: Selected Poems], Flood Editions, Chicago, 2014 ISBN 9798985787467

Essays

- Magpie Rising: Sketches from the Great Plains, Pruett | Vintage | Bison, 1988 | 1990 | 2003
- Burnt House to Paw Paw: Appalachian Notes, Hard Press, West Stockbridge, MA, 1997
- Chokecherry Places: Essays from the High Plains, Johnson Books, Boulder, 1998
- Rivers & Birds, Johnson Books, Boulder, 2003
- The Warbler Road, Flood Editions, Chicago, 2010 ISBN 978-0-9819520-4-8

Fiction

- Sworn Before Cranes, Crown, New York, 1994
- Grasshopper Falls, Hanging Loose, Brooklyn, 2000
- Talk Across Water, Flood Editions, Chicago, 2019

Drawings

- Distant Rivers, Prairie Rose Press, Muscatine, IA, 2013

== Interviews ==
- Chicago Review, Winter, 2013
- L’Art du paysage, vol. 7, "Motifs du Paysage Nord-American," Vincent Dussol, Paris, 2014
- The Believer, "An Interview with Merrill Gilfillan", Martin Riker, April 18, 2019

== Awards ==
- 1967, Major Hopwood Award for poetry, University of Michigan
- 1989, PEN/Martha Albrand Award for First Nonfiction for Magpie Rising
- 1998, Western States Book Award for Creative Nonfiction for Chokecherry Places
