= Morrow County Airport =

Public use airport in Mount Gilead, Ohio

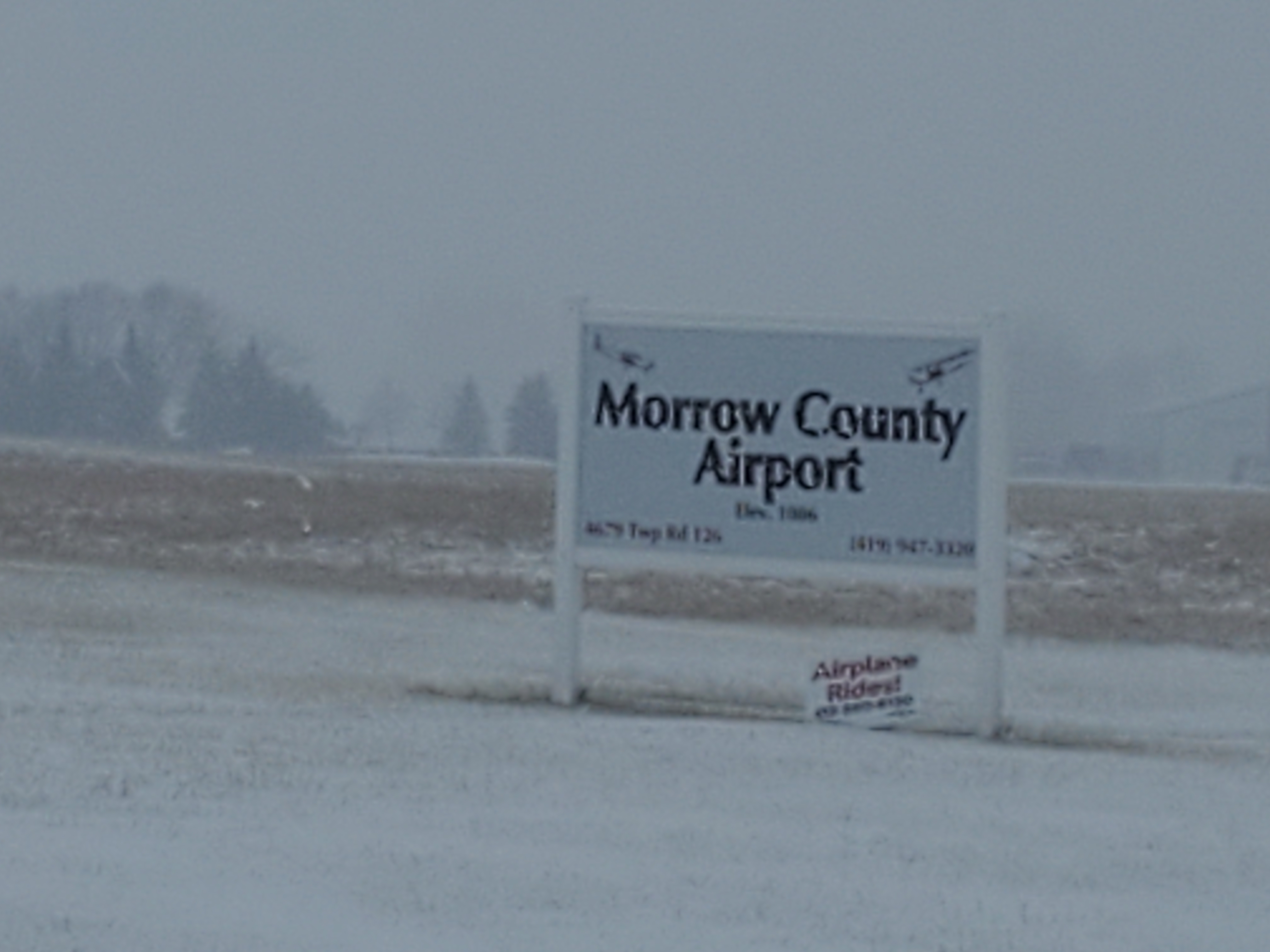
- IATA: none; ICAO: none; FAA LID: 4I9

Summary
- Airport type: Public
- Owner: Morrow County Airport Authority
- Location: Mount Gilead
- Time zone: UTC−05:00 (-5)
  - Summer (DST): UTC−04:00 (-4)
- Elevation AMSL: 1,085.6 ft / 330.9 m
- Coordinates: 40°31′28″N 082°51′00″W

Map
- Location of airport in Ohio 4I9 (the United States)

Runways
Direction	Length		Surface
Direction	ft	m	Surface
10/28	3,497	1,066	Asphalt

Statistics (2022)
- Aircraft operations: 3,120
- Based aircraft: 21
- Source: Federal Aviation Administration

Morrow County Airport (FAA LID: 4I9) is a public airport located two miles southwest of Mount Gilead, Ohio, United States. It is owned and operated by the Morrow County Airport Authority.

== History ==
Plans for an airport in Morrow County began as early as August 1965, when the possibility was suggested at a county commission meeting. By late February 1968 an 80-acre (32 ha) site had been selected. A contract for the construction of a 3,500-foot (1,100 m) runway was awarded in early August.

The county approved a contract to pave the ramp and add lighting in mid July 1970. At the same time, it approved leasing the airport to Aero Industries Incorporated.

By 1975 the airport had yet to show a profit. The airport, along with a Cessna Pilot Center, was initially scheduled to be dedicated on 18 August 1977. However, it was later announced as being planned for October 2nd.

Butch Fisher, an agricultural pilot, became airport manager in mid to late 1982.

A proposal was made in December 2019 to locate an aircraft maintenance business at the airport.

== Facilities and aircraft ==
Morrow County Airport covers an area of 88 acres (36 ha) which contains one runway designated 10/28 with a 3,497 ft × 65 ft (1,066 m × 20 m) asphalt pavement.

There is no fixed-base operator at the airport. However, plans to upgrade the airport's hangar and passenger terminal were announced in 2019.

For the 12-month period ending June 7, 2022, the airport had 3,120 aircraft operations, an average of 60 per week: 99% general aviation and <1% military. For the same time period, 21 aircraft were based at the airport: 20 single-engine airplanes and 1 helicopter.

Fisher's Ag Service, an agricultural aviation business, is based at the airport.

== Accidents and incidents ==
- On December 30, 2004, a Cessna 172N was damaged after departure from the Morrow County Airport. The weather at the airport was initially conducive for operating under visual flight rules, but witnesses say it deteriorated "rapidly" as the pilot taxied to the runway. Once airborne, the airplane entered an overcast cloud layer at approximately 300 feet and was heard circling back towards the airport. The airplane then descended out of the clouds at a high rate of speed in a nose low attitude and impacted the ground. The pilot was a non-instrument-rated private pilot. The probable cause of the accident was found to be the pilot's failure to maintain control of the airplane following an inadvertent encounter with instrument meteorological conditions. The pilot and two passengers were killed.

== See also ==
- List of airports in Ohio
