= Edison, Ohio =

- Village
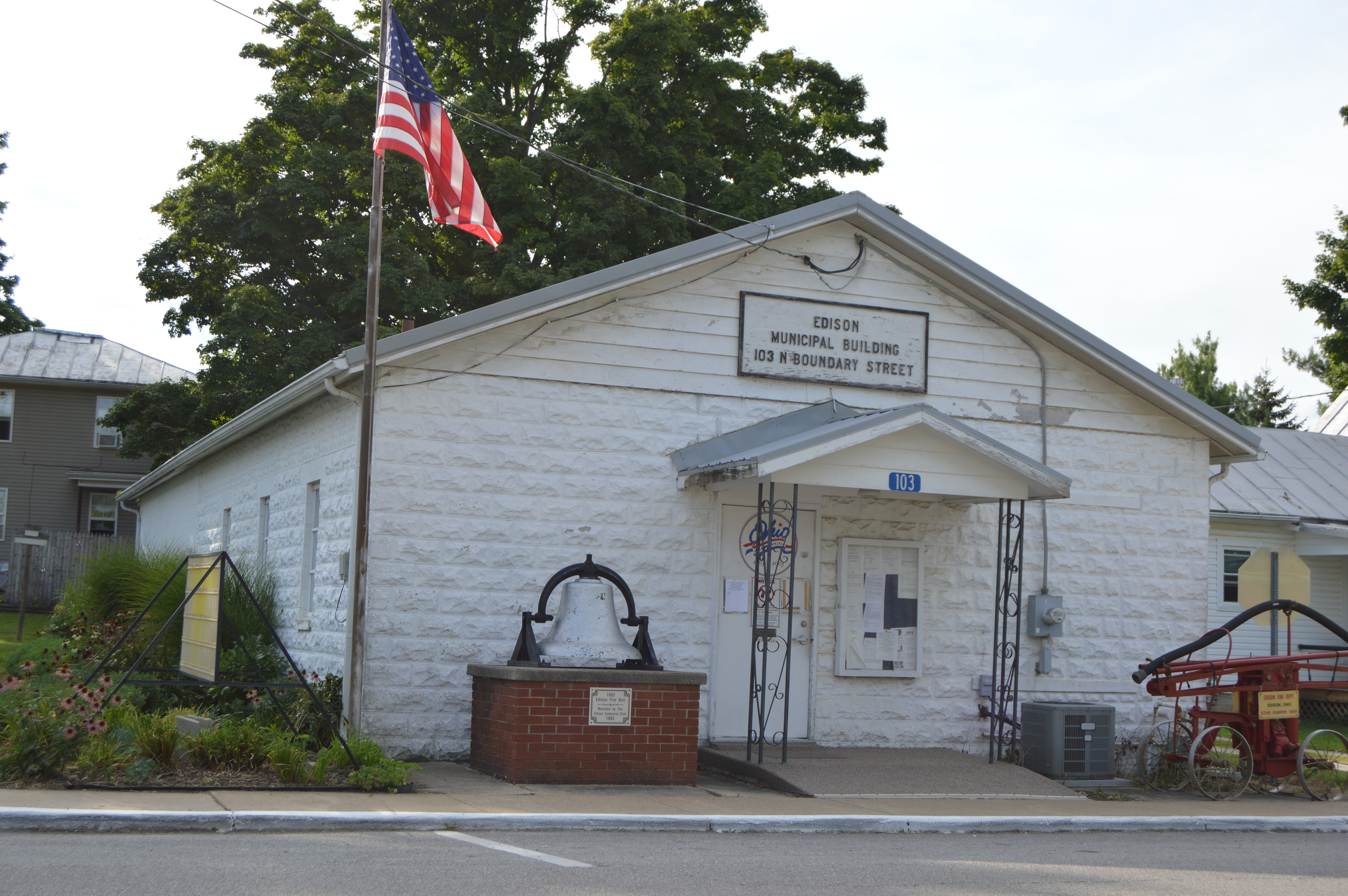
- Village offices on Boundary Street

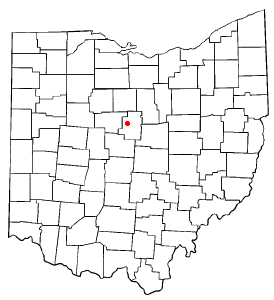
- Location of Edison, Ohio

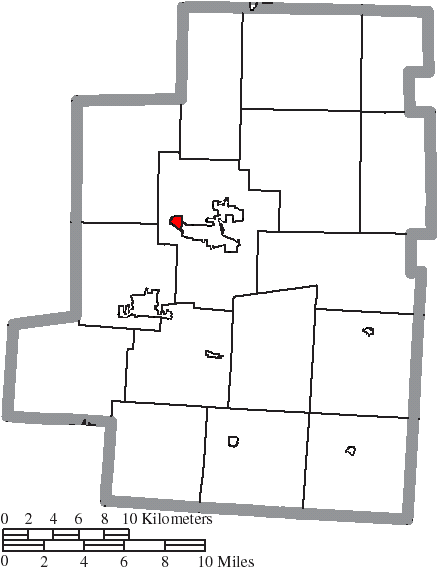
- Location of Edison in Morrow County
- Coordinates: 40°33′30″N 82°51′48″W
- Country: United States
- State: Ohio
- County: Morrow
- Township: Gilead

Area
  - Total: 0.29 sq mi (0.74 km^{2})
  - Land: 0.29 sq mi (0.74 km^{2})
  - Water: 0 sq mi (0.00 km^{2})
- Elevation: 1,063 ft (324 m)

Population (2020)
  - Total: 422
  - Estimate (2023): 441
  - Density: 1,468.2/sq mi (566.88/km^{2})
- Time zone: UTC-5 (Eastern (EST))
  - Summer (DST): UTC-4 (EDT)
- ZIP code: 43320
- Area code: 419
- FIPS code: 39-24598
- GNIS feature ID: 2398787
- Website: https://edisonoh.net/

Edison is a village in Morrow County, Ohio, United States. The population was 422 at the 2020 census. Edison is adjacent to and west of Mount Gilead, Ohio, the county seat.

== History ==
Edison was formerly called Gilead Station, and later Levering. The present name is for American inventor Thomas Alva Edison. A post office called Gilead Station was established in 1874, and the name was changed to Edison in 1881.

== Geography ==
Edison is considered to be a part of Central Ohio.

According to the United States Census Bureau, the village has a total area of 0.29 square miles (0.75 km^{2}), all of it land.

== Demographics ==
Historical population
Census	Pop.	Note	%±
1880	152		—
1890	345		127.0%
1900	347		0.6%
1910	387		11.5%
1920	386		−0.3%
1930	380		−1.6%
1940	419		10.3%
1950	471		12.4%
1960	559		18.7%
1970	569		1.8%
1980	504		−11.4%
1990	488		−3.2%
2000	437		−10.5%
2010	437		0.0%
2020	422		−3.4%
2023 (est.)	441	▲	4.5%
U.S. Decennial Census

=== 2010 census ===
As of the census of 2010, there were 437 people, 166 households, and 121 families living in the village. The population density was 1,506.9 inhabitants per square mile (581.8/km^{2}). There were 192 housing units at an average density of 662.1 per square mile (255.6/km^{2}). The racial makeup of the village was 98.9% White, 0.2% African American, 0.2% Asian, and 0.7% from two or more races. Hispanic or Latino of any race were 1.8% of the population.

There were 166 households, of which 36.7% had children under the age of 18 living with them, 45.8% were married couples living together, 20.5% had a female householder with no husband present, 6.6% had a male householder with no wife present, and 27.1% were non-families. 21.7% of all households were made up of individuals, and 7.2% had someone living alone who was 65 years of age or older. The average household size was 2.63 and the average family size was 3.04.

The median age in the village was 36.9 years. 25.4% of residents were under the age of 18; 8.1% were between the ages of 18 and 24; 26.8% were from 25 to 44; 24.3% were from 45 to 64; and 15.6% were 65 years of age or older. The gender makeup of the village was 48.1% male and 51.9% female.

=== 2000 census ===
As of the census of 2000, there were 437 people, 165 households, and 119 families living in the village. The population density was 1,516.2 inhabitants per square mile (585.4/km^{2}). There were 178 housing units at an average density of 617.6 per square mile (238.5/km^{2}). The racial makeup of the village was 98.17% White, 0.46% Native American, 0.23% Asian, and 1.14% from two or more races. Hispanic or Latino of any race were 0.69% of the population.

There were 165 households, out of which 32.1% had children under the age of 18 living with them, 57.0% were married couples living together, 9.7% had a female householder with no husband present, and 27.3% were non-families. 20.0% of all households were made up of individuals, and 7.9% had someone living alone who was 65 years of age or older. The average household size was 2.65 and the average family size was 3.05.

In the village, the population was spread out, with 25.9% under the age of 18, 10.1% from 18 to 24, 29.7% from 25 to 44, 22.0% from 45 to 64, and 12.4% who were 65 years of age or older. The median age was 36 years. For every 100 females there were 99.5 males. For every 100 females age 18 and over, there were 102.5 males.

The median income for a household in the village was $39,167, and the median income for a family was $41,250. Males had a median income of $30,987 versus $25,417 for females. The per capita income for the village was $15,722. About 12.1% of families and 13.4% of the population were below the poverty line, including 23.4% of those under age 18 and 5.0% of those age 65 or over.
