= Mount Gilead, Virginia =

Unincorporated community in Virginia, United States

- Unincorporated community
- Location within Northern Virginia Location within Virginia Location within the United States
- Coordinates: 39°3′31″N 77°39′52″W
- Country: United States
- State: Virginia
- County: Loudoun
- Time zone: UTC−5 (Eastern (EST))
  - Summer (DST): UTC−4 (EDT)

Mount Gilead is an unincorporated community in Loudoun County, Virginia, United States. Mount Gilead lies atop a 602 ft (183 m) peak of Catoctin Mountain to the east of the North Fork Goose Creek.

== History ==
Mount Gilead began in 1821 when Dr. Isaac Eaton purchased 18 acres (73,000 m^{2}; 7.3 ha) on the western slope of Catoctin Mountain on the road from Leesburg to Coes Mill on the North Fork of Goose Creek for the purpose of founding a health spa from the mountain springs there. In 1823 Eaton sold three half-acre lots on his property for the establishment of a settlement named Mount Gilead, after the biblical mountain. The following year, his dream was given legitimacy by the establishment of a post office in the village. By 1835 the village had extended to 22 lots and several streets had been laid out.

Though the Civil War largely passed by Mount Gilead, Eaton's spa went out of business due to lack of patrons during the war. In the postbellum years, the village continued to grow and prosper, with a school opening in 1870 and the establishment of several stills at the springs that once fed the spa.

The beginning of the end for Mount Gilead came in 1889 with the closing of Coes Mill. The post office was closed in 1905 and the school in 1918. With the coming of Prohibition in 1921, the last of Mount Gilead's industries literally dried up and, by 1930, the county stopped maintaining the road from Mount Gilead to North Fork, thus placing the village at the end of a dead end road.

Today the village still exists as a small residential community, which in a small way has returned to the spirits industry in the form of Willowcroft Vineyard, which operates just north of the village.
