= South Bloomfield Township, Morrow County, Ohio =

Township in Ohio, US

- Township
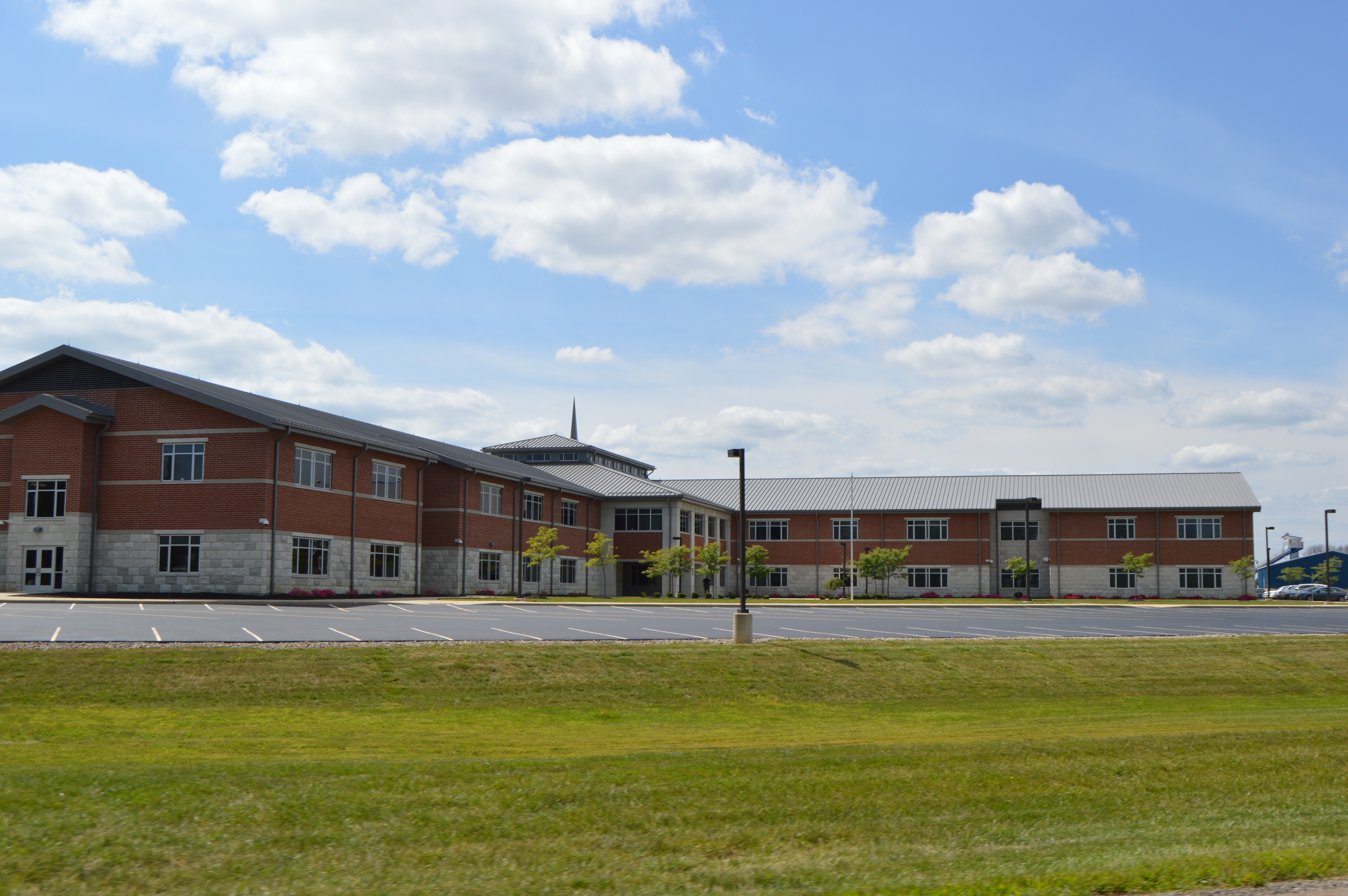
- Highland High School

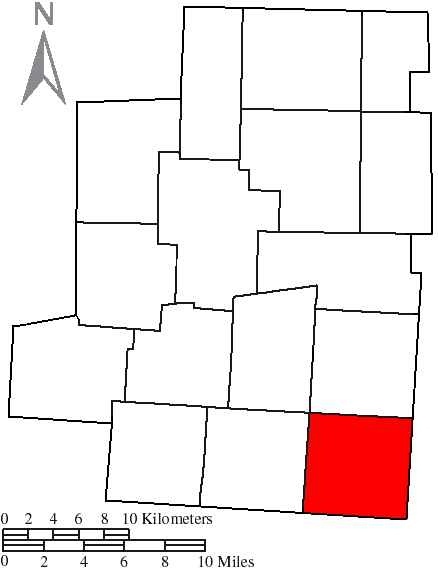
- Location of South Bloomfield Township in Morrow County
- Coordinates: 40°23′15″N 82°41′4″W
- Country: United States
- State: Ohio
- County: Morrow

Area
  - Total: 25.9 sq mi (67.2 km^{2})
  - Land: 25.9 sq mi (67.1 km^{2})
  - Water: 0.039 sq mi (0.1 km^{2})
- Elevation: 1,365 ft (416 m)

Population (2020)
  - Total: 1,768
  - Density: 68.2/sq mi (26.3/km^{2})
- Time zone: UTC-5 (Eastern (EST))
  - Summer (DST): UTC-4 (EDT)
- FIPS code: 39-73061
- GNIS feature ID: 1086709
- Website: https://southbloomfieldtwp.com/

South Bloomfield Township is one of the sixteen townships of Morrow County, Ohio, United States. The 2020 census found 1,768 people in the township, 121 of whom lived in the village of Sparta.

== Geography ==
Located in the southeastern corner of the county, it borders the following townships:

- Chester Township - north
- Wayne Township, Knox County - northeast corner
- Liberty Township, Knox County - east
- Milford Township, Knox County - southeast corner
- Hilliar Township, Knox County - south
- Porter Township, Delaware County - southwest corner
- Bennington Township - west
- Harmony Township - northwest corner

The village of Sparta is located in northern South Bloomfield Township.

== Name and history ==
South Bloomfield Township was organized in 1817. Bloomfield is a descriptive name for the wildflowers which were once frequent there. It is the only South Bloomfield Township statewide.

== Government ==
The township is governed by a three-member board of trustees, who are elected in November of odd-numbered years to a four-year term beginning on the following January 1. Two are elected in the year after the presidential election and one is elected in the year before it. There is also an elected township fiscal officer, who serves a four-year term beginning on April 1 of the year after the election, which is held in November of the year before the presidential election. Vacancies in the fiscal officership or on the board of trustees are filled by the remaining trustees.
