= Harmony Township, Morrow County, Ohio =

Township in Ohio, US

- Township
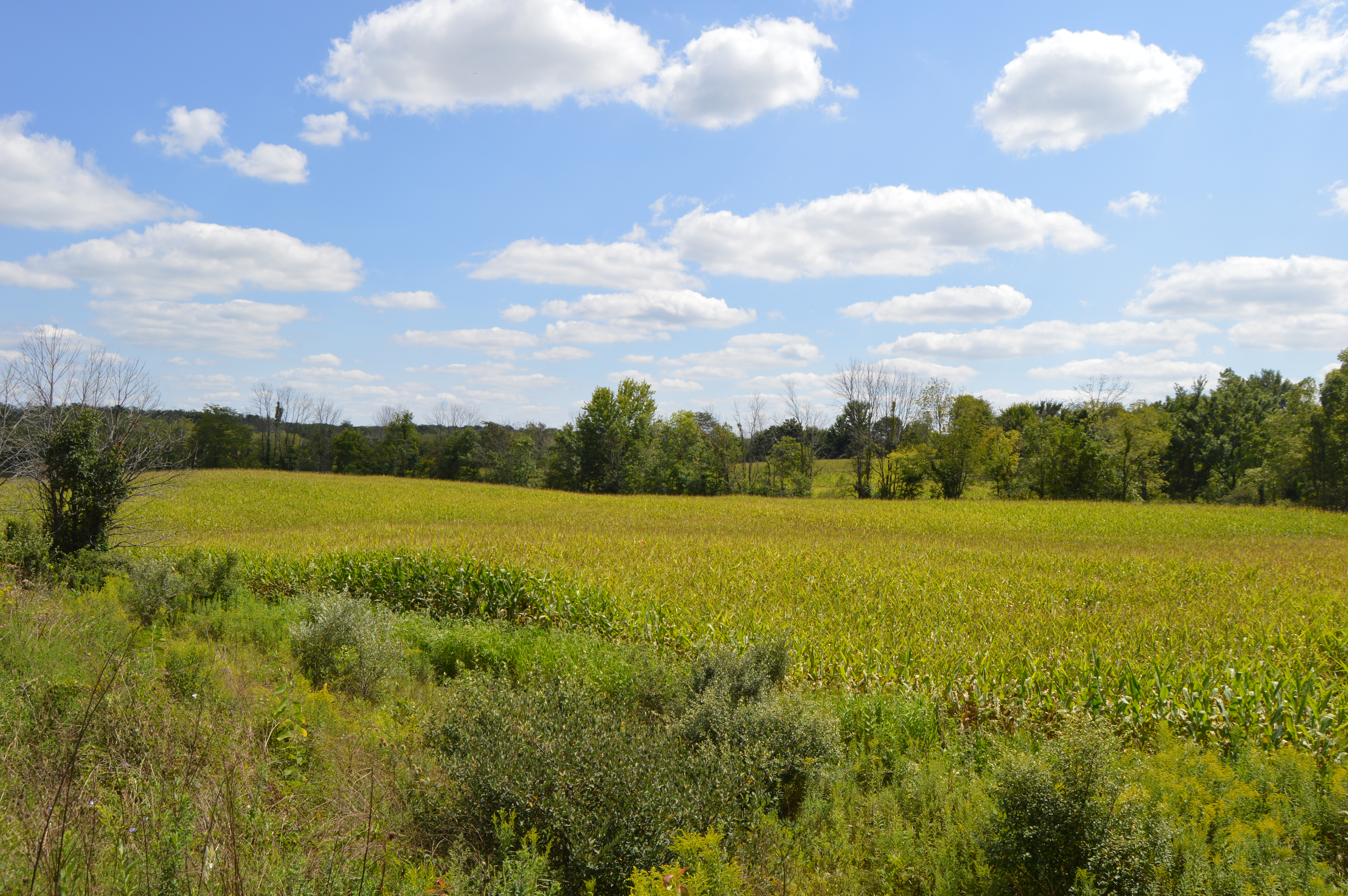
- Between Marengo and Fulton

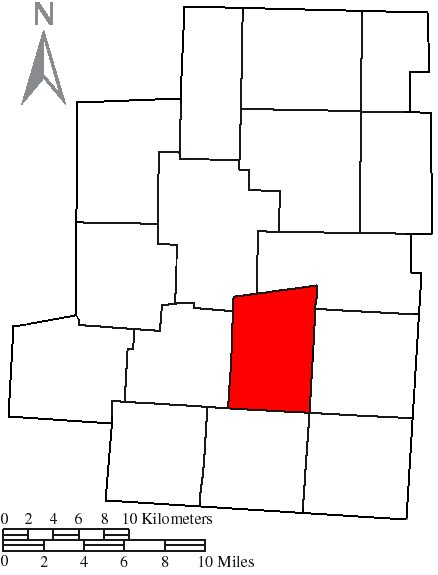
- Location of Harmony Township in Morrow County
- Coordinates: 40°27′56″N 82°46′24″W
- Country: United States
- State: Ohio
- County: Morrow

Area
  - Total: 24.0 sq mi (62.1 km^{2})
  - Land: 23.9 sq mi (62.0 km^{2})
  - Water: 0.039 sq mi (0.1 km^{2})
- Elevation: 1,220 ft (372 m)

Population (2020)
  - Total: 2,610
  - Density: 109/sq mi (42.1/km^{2})
- Time zone: UTC-5 (Eastern (EST))
  - Summer (DST): UTC-4 (EDT)
- FIPS code: 39-33600
- GNIS feature ID: 1086704

Harmony Township is one of the sixteen townships of Morrow County, Ohio, United States. The 2020 census found 2,610 people in the township.

== Geography ==
Located in the central part of the county, it borders the following townships:

- Franklin Township - northeast
- Chester Township - east
- South Bloomfield Township - southeast corner
- Bennington Township - south
- Lincoln Township - west
- Gilead Township - northwest

No municipalities are located in Harmony Township.

== Name and history ==
Harmony Township was organized in 1820. Statewide, the only other Harmony Township is located in Clark County.

== Government ==
The township is governed by a three-member board of trustees, who are elected in November of odd-numbered years to a four-year term beginning on the following January 1. Two are elected in the year after the presidential election and one is elected in the year before it. There is also an elected township fiscal officer, who serves a four-year term beginning on April 1 of the year after the election, which is held in November of the year before the presidential election. Vacancies in the fiscal officership or on the board of trustees are filled by the remaining trustees.
