= Old Union School (Chesterville, Ohio) =

Historic place in Ohio

- U.S. National Register of Historic Places
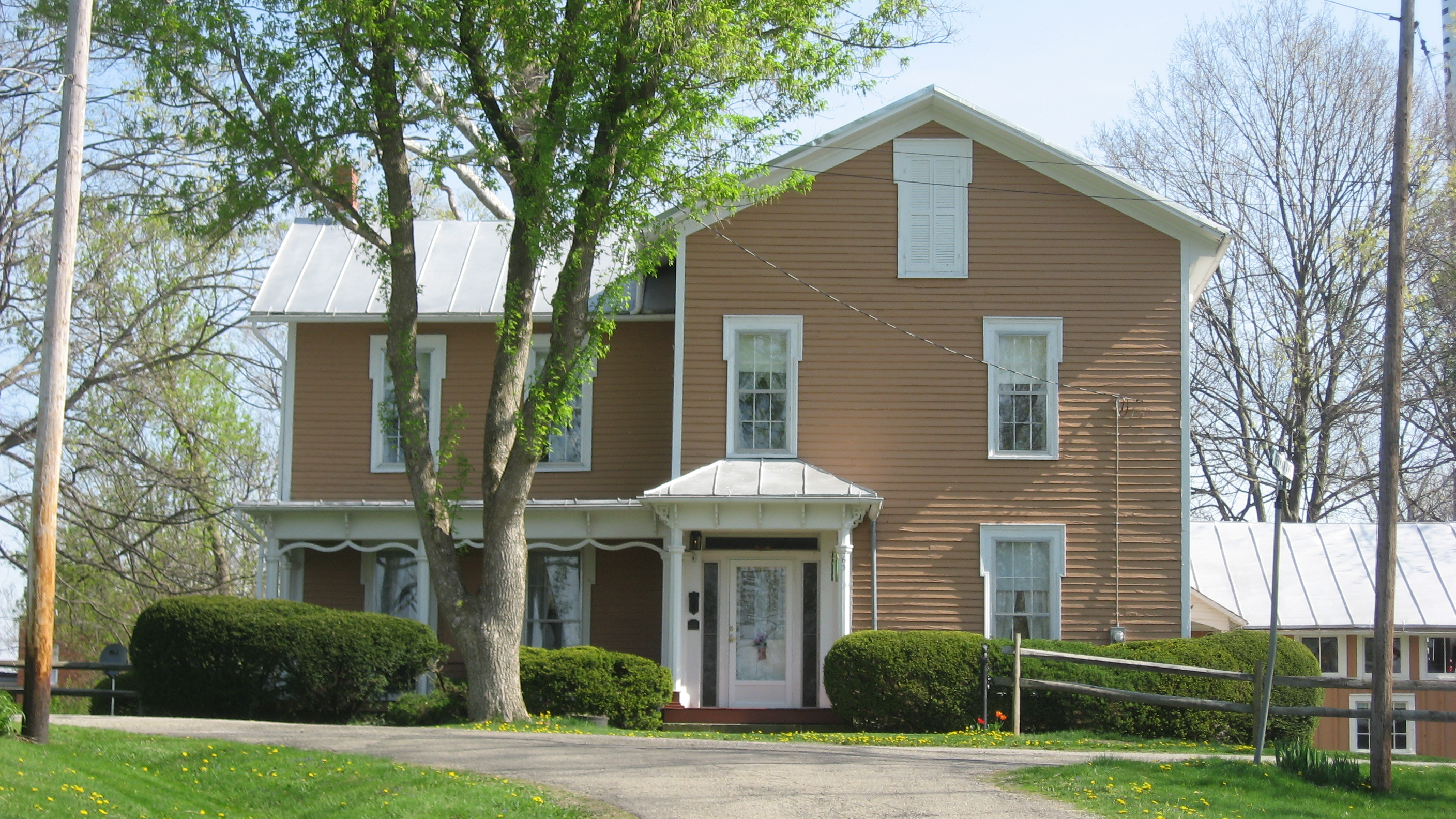

- Location within Ohio Location within the United States
- Location: Off of OH 314, Chesterville, Ohio
- Coordinates: 40°28′51″N 82°40′56″W
- Area: 1 acre (0.40 ha)
- Built: 1860
- Architectural style: Greek Revival
- MPS: Chesterville MRA
- NRHP reference No.: 79002743
- Added to NRHP: August 21, 1979

The Old Union School off Ohio State Route 314 in Chesterville, Ohio, was built in 1860. It was listed on the National Register of Historic Places in 1979.

The structure primarily incorporates Greek Revival architecture, but includes some Italianate features. It is the oldest remaining academic building in the area. The building was used for this purpose until 1890 and has since served as a residence.
