= Levering Hall =

- U.S. National Register of Historic Places
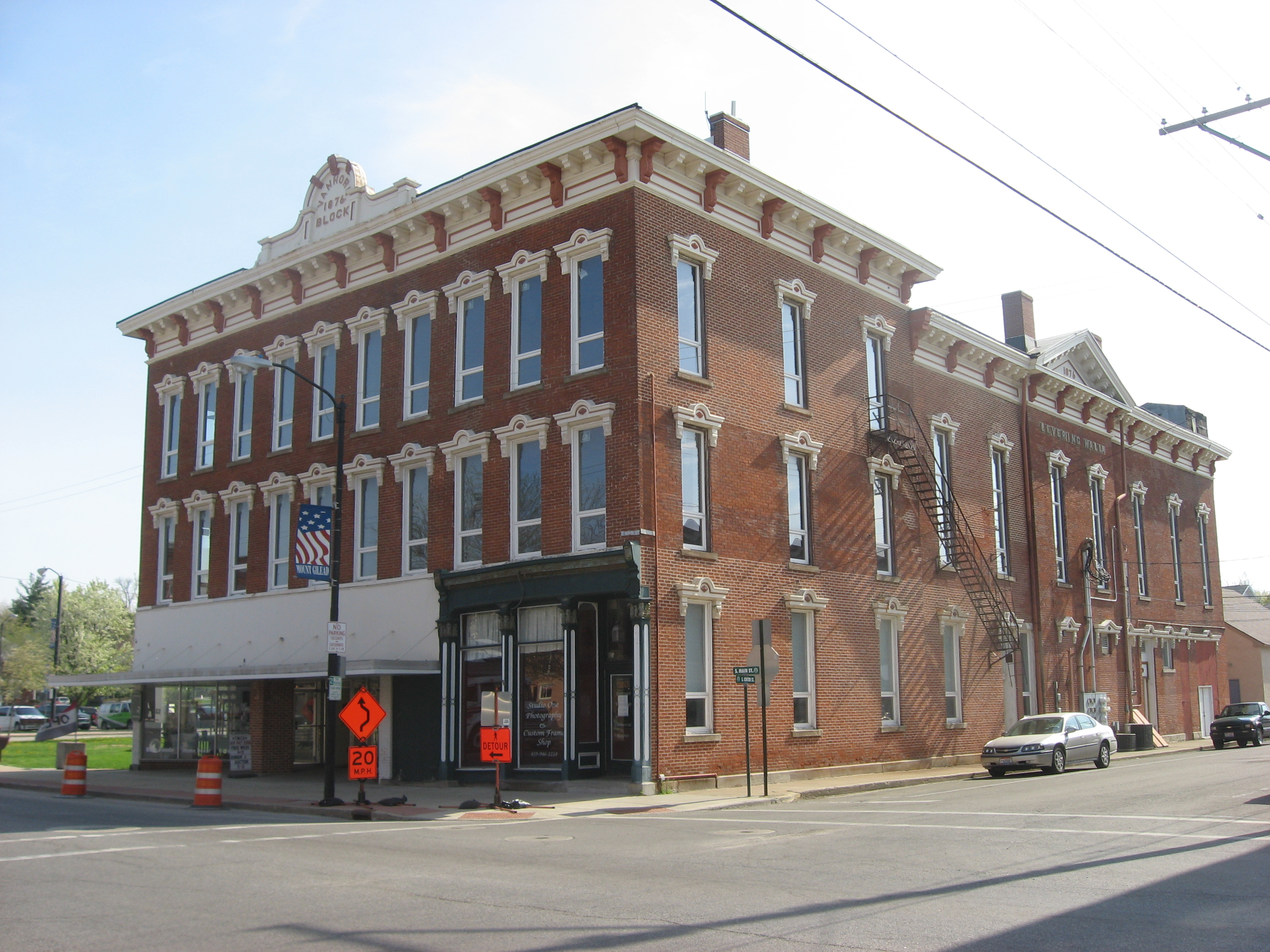
- Front and side of the hall. Note the differing rooflines of the two portions of the building.

- Location within Ohio Location within the United States
- Location: 12 S. Main St., Mount Gilead, Ohio
- Coordinates: 40°32′55″N 82°49′41″W
- Area: less than one acre
- Built: 1876
- Architect: William Miller
- Architectural style: Italianate
- NRHP reference No.: 80003180
- Added to NRHP: May 29, 1980

Levering Hall is a historic building in downtown Mount Gilead, Ohio, United States. A fine example of the Italianate style, it was intended to house a range of civic functions.

Architecturally, Levering Hall is distinguished by such elements as elaborate ironwork and detailed cornices. Built in the national centennial year of 1876, it was initially conceived as a village hall and fire station, but before construction began, local businessmen proposed using its front portion for commercial purposes. Ultimately, the front and rear were built separately at a combined cost of $22,500. Among the most distinctive portions of the finished two-piece building was an opera hall, used as a community theater until the end of the 1940s. The village offices and fire station also left the building in the middle of the twentieth century.

Plans for the building that became Levering Hall were laid during a period of rapid growth for the village of Mount Gilead, which had only recently been a tiny crossroads community. The hall's cornerstone was laid on June 28, 1876, and construction was finished by the end of the year. Its builders were Miller and Smith, who were known for their work on several Ohio county courthouses and the Ohio Penitentiary in Columbus. Leading Mount Gilead businessman Allen Levering was the building's namesake; a future state legislator, he helped to organize the local business association that proposed using the building for commercial purposes.

In 1980, Levering Hall was listed on the National Register of Historic Places. It qualified for listing because of its distinctive architecture, its part in overall local history, and its connection to Allen Levering.
