= Mount Gilead, Ohio =

- Village
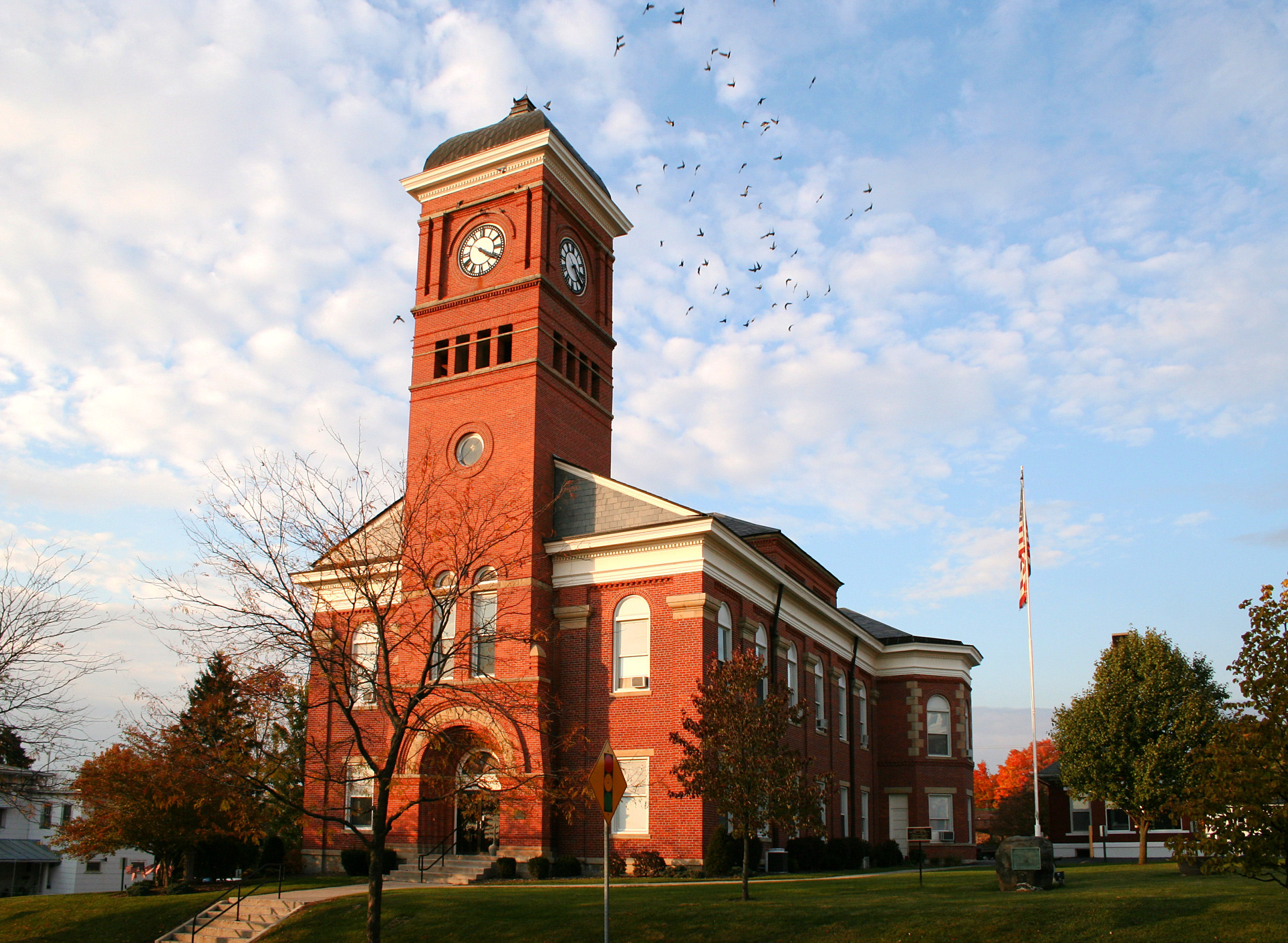
- Morrow County Courthouse
- Interactive map of Mount Gilead, Ohio
- Location within Ohio Location within the United States
- Coordinates: 40°33′12″N 82°49′41″W
- Country: United States
- State: Ohio
- County: Morrow
- Township: Gilead
- Established: 1824
- Incorporated: 1839
- Named for: Mount Gilead, Virginia

Government
  - Mayor: Donna J. Carver

Area
  - Total: 3.40 sq mi (8.80 km^{2})
  - Land: 3.39 sq mi (8.77 km^{2})
  - Water: 0.012 sq mi (0.03 km^{2})
- Elevation: 1,145 ft (349 m)

Population (2020)
  - Total: 3,503
  - Density: 1,034.3/sq mi (399.33/km^{2})
- Time zone: UTC-5 (Eastern (EST))
  - Summer (DST): UTC-4 (EDT)
- ZIP code: 43338
- Area code: 419
- FIPS code: 39-52738
- GNIS feature ID: 2399412
- Website: www.mountgilead.net

Mount Gilead is a village in and the county seat of Morrow County, Ohio, United States. It is located 41 miles (66 km) northeast of Columbus. The population was 3,503 at the 2020 census. It is the center of population of Ohio. The village was established in 1832, eight years after European settlers arrived in the region.

Located in the center of the village is Morrow County's historic World War I Victory Memorial Shaft, unique in the United States, and Mt. Gilead State Park is nearby on State Route 95. Other areas drawing tourism include the Amish farms, shops and stores east of Mount Gilead, near Chesterville and Johnsville. Mount Gilead is also home to the OhioHealth Morrow County Hospital.

== History ==
The first settler to Mount Gilead was Lewis Hardenbrook in 1817, though it was then called Whetstone and located in Marion County. In 1824, Judge Jacob Young drew out the village; the plan consisted of 80 lots and also included a public square. Several years later, in 1832, Henry Ustick added 70 lots to the village as well as an additional public square. The original public square was then referred to as the south square and the newer square, the north square. Charles Webster built the first cabin in the village in December 1824. He served as the first postmaster and operated the post office from the cabin, as well.

In 1832, a measure was proposed to change the name of the town. Residents were asked to vote between the names Warsaw and Mount Gilead. It was named after Mount Gilead, Virginia, where some of the residents were originally from. Mount Gilead was chosen by a significant margin and the village was incorporated by state legislature several years later in 1839.

In 1848, Mount Gilead was almost unanimously chosen to be the county seat for the newly formed Morrow County, formed from parts of surrounding Marion, Knox, Richland, and Delaware counties. Given the village's elevated status as the county seat, village leaders enhanced many areas of the town's appearance by creating streets clearing them and performing other improvements.

Soon after being named county seat, there was talk of building a rail line that would pass through Mount Gilead between Cleveland and Columbus. Officials opened stock purchases and began preparations for the build. Tensions between villagers and railroad officials broke down the negotiations and the rail station was re-located to Cardington, several miles south of Mount Gilead, and opened for business in 1851. The railroad would pass Mount Gilead two miles to the west, in what is now known as Edison. Nearly 30 years later, Mount Gilead did get a rail spur through the village, named Mt. Gilead Short Line Railway. The Short Line opened in 1880.

In 1919, the north public square would become home to the Victory Shaft World War I Monument. This monument was given to the county for having the highest per capita war bond sales during a two-year period.

== Geography ==
According to the United States Census Bureau, the village has a total area of 3.40 square miles (8.81 km^{2}), of which, 3.39 square miles (8.78 km^{2}) is land and 0.01 square miles (0.03 km^{2}) is water.

Mount Gilead is considered to be a part of "Mid Ohio."

== Demographics ==
Historical population
Census	Pop.	Note	%±
1850	646		—
1860	789		22.1%
1870	1,087		37.8%
1880	1,216		11.9%
1890	1,329		9.3%
1900	1,528		15.0%
1910	1,673		9.5%
1920	1,837		9.8%
1930	1,871		1.9%
1940	2,008		7.3%
1950	2,351		17.1%
1960	2,788		18.6%
1970	2,971		6.6%
1980	2,865		−3.6%
1990	2,846		−0.7%
2000	3,290		15.6%
2010	3,660		11.2%
2020	3,503		−4.3%

=== 2020 census ===
As of the 2020 census, Mount Gilead had a population of 3,503. The median age was 41.3 years. 21.5% of residents were under the age of 18 and 19.6% of residents were 65 years of age or older. For every 100 females there were 91.1 males, and for every 100 females age 18 and over there were 90.6 males age 18 and over.

0.0% of residents lived in urban areas, while 100.0% lived in rural areas.

There were 1,508 households in Mount Gilead, of which 25.8% had children under the age of 18 living in them. Of all households, 35.7% were married-couple households, 20.2% were households with a male householder and no spouse or partner present, and 34.5% were households with a female householder and no spouse or partner present. About 37.5% of all households were made up of individuals and 16.3% had someone living alone who was 65 years of age or older.

There were 1,655 housing units, of which 8.9% were vacant. The homeowner vacancy rate was 3.8% and the rental vacancy rate was 4.3%.

Racial composition as of the 2020 census
Race	Number	Percent
White	3,205	91.5%
Black or African American	32	0.9%
American Indian and Alaska Native	7	0.2%
Asian	14	0.4%
Native Hawaiian and Other Pacific Islander	3	0.1%
Some other race	58	1.7%
Two or more races	184	5.3%
Hispanic or Latino (of any race)	105	3.0%

=== 2010 census ===
As of the census of 2010, there were 3,660 people, 1,482 households, and 875 families residing in the village. The population density was 1,079.6 inhabitants per square mile (416.8/km^{2}). There were 1,658 housing units at an average density of 489.1 per square mile (188.8/km^{2}). The racial makeup of the village was 97.1% White, 0.1% Native American, 0.2% Asian, 0.3% from other races, and 2.0% from two or more races. Hispanic or Latino of any race were 1.9% of the population.

There were 1,482 households, of which 32.4% had children under the age of 18 living with them, 40.7% were married couples living together, 13.0% had a female householder with no husband present, 5.3% had a male householder with no wife present, and 41.0% were non-families. 35.0% of all households were made up of individuals, and 16.6% had someone living alone who was 65 years of age or older. The average household size was 2.34 and the average family size was 3.01.

The median age in the village was 36.9 years. 24.5% of residents were under the age of 18; 9.7% were between the ages of 18 and 24; 25.5% were from 25 to 44; 22.9% were from 45 to 64; and 17.3% were 65 years of age or older. The gender makeup of the village was 47.3% male and 52.7% female.

=== 2000 census ===
As of the census of 2000, there were 3,290 people, 1,291 households, and 843 families residing in the village. The population density was 1,035.7 inhabitants per square mile (399.9/km^{2}). There were 1,354 housing units at an average density of 426.3 per square mile (164.6/km^{2}). The racial makeup of the village was 97.78% White, 0.12% Native American, 0.24% Asian, 0.30% from other races, 1.06% Black, and 0.49% from two or more races. Hispanic or Latino of any race were 1.03% of the population.

There were 1,291 households, out of which 31.6% had children under the age of 18 living with them, 50.8% were married couples living together, 10.6% had a female householder with no husband present, and 34.7% were non-families. 31.1% of all households were made up of individuals, and 18.1% had someone living alone who was 65 years of age or older. The average household size was 2.35 and the average family size was 2.91.

In the village, the population was spread out, with 24.0% under the age of 18, 8.4% from 18 to 24, 28.3% from 25 to 44, 20.5% from 45 to 64, and 18.8% who were 65 years of age or older. The median age was 38 years. For every 100 females, there were 90.5 males. For every 100 females age 18 and over, there were 90.0 males.

The median income for a household in the village was $31,894, and the median income for a family was $42,529. Males had a median income of $35,714 versus $22,425 for females. The per capita income for the village was $19,064. About 10.1% of families and 13.2% of the population were below the poverty line, including 18.1% of those under age 18 and 16.4% of those age 65 or over.

=== 19th-century census data ===
According to A.J. Baughman's History of Morrow County, Ohio (1911), early population data is as follows:

Year	1850	1860	1870	1880	1890
Population	646	789	1,087	1,216	1,329

== Arts and culture ==
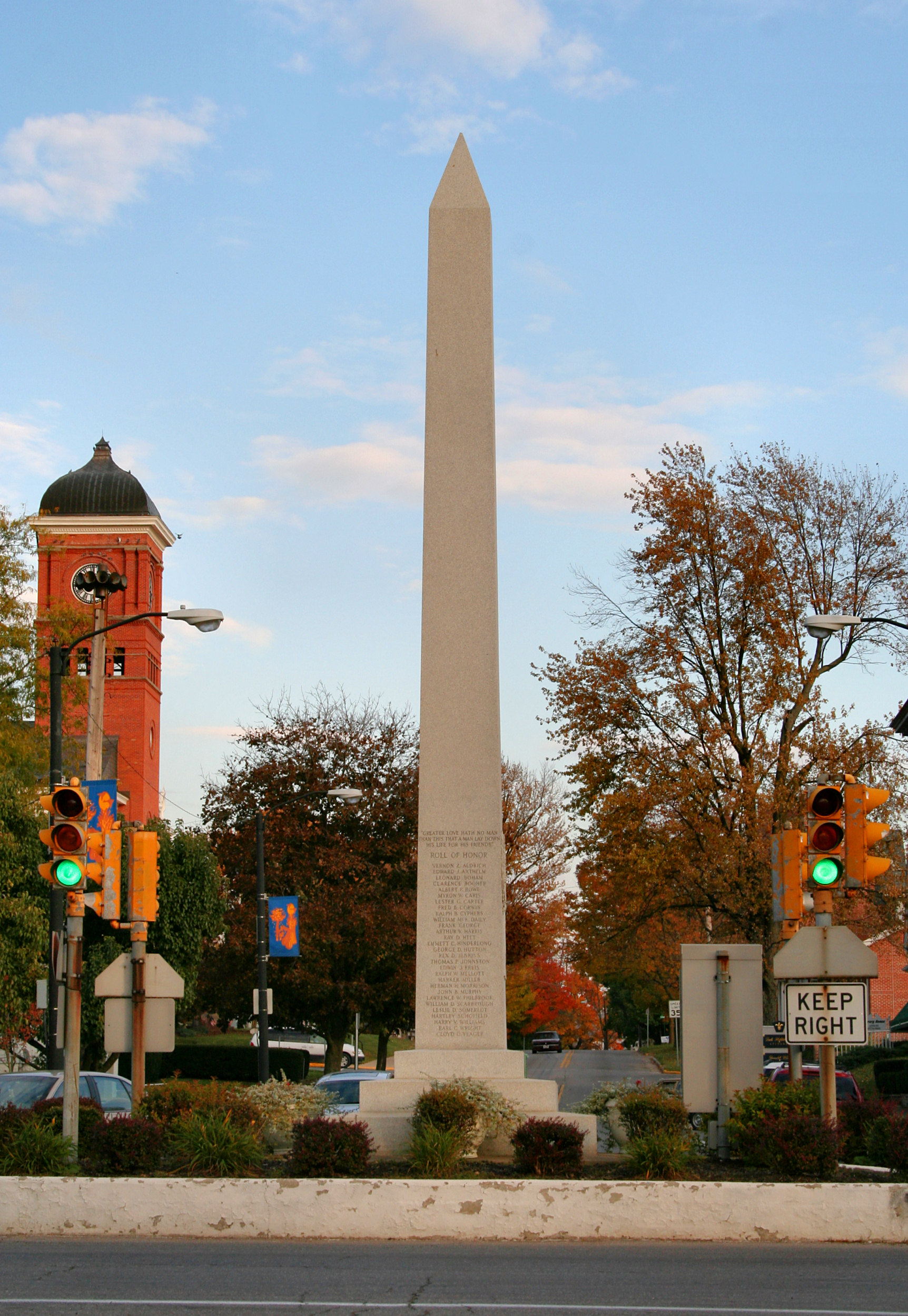
Victory Memorial Shaft

Four properties in Mount Gilead are listed on the National Register of Historic Places: the floral hall at the county fairgrounds, Levering Hall, the Morrow County Courthouse, and the James S. Trimble House. Levering Hall in particular is distinguished by its ornate Italianate architecture and its place as the center of community life for several decades.

The Victory Shaft was erected in Mount Gilead's town square in December 1919, following World War I. It was presented as a gift from the federal government to Morrow County citizens to thank them for purchasing more war bonds per capita than any other county. Warren G. Harding, a Senator who would later be elected President, was the keynote speaker at the dedication.

== Government ==
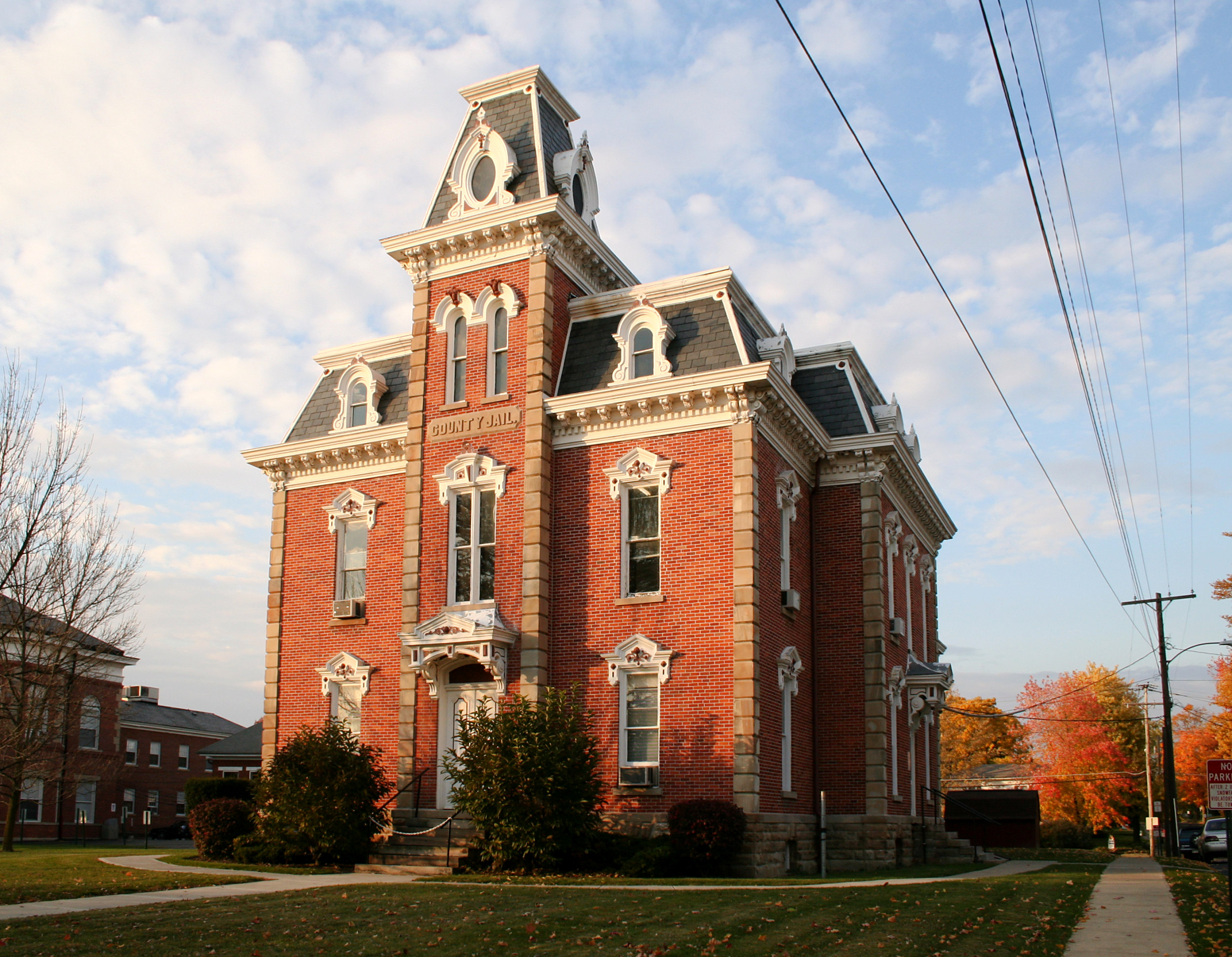
Old Morrow County Jail

Mount Gilead is governed by a mayor-council government. As of 2026, the mayor is Donna Carver.

== Education ==
The city has a public lending library, the Mount Gilead Public Library. The Mount Gilead Exempted Village School District includes the Mount Gilead High School.

== Media ==
Mt. Gilead had two media sources available to them in the 19th century, Democratic Messenger and The Whig Sentinel. Both papers began publishing in 1848 and both papers experienced a name change around 1860 with The Sentinel becoming The Morrow County Sentinel and The Messenger becoming The Union Register. The Union Register was published until 1971, while the Morrow County Sentinel is still in existence today.

== Infrastructure ==
=== Transportation ===
The Morrow County Airport is located two nautical miles (2.3 mi; 3.7 km) southwest of Mount Gilead's central business district.

== Notable people ==
- Tim Belcher, former Major League Baseball player
- Oswald Bruce Cooper, graphic designer
- Claude Dallas, self-styled mountain man convicted of involuntary manslaughter
- C.B. Dollaway, professional mixed martial arts fighter
- Frank K. Dunn, Chief Justice of the Illinois Supreme Court
- Merrill Gilfillan, author
- William Vermillion Houston, president of Rice University
- Robert Byington Mitchell, soldier and governor of New Mexico
- Walter Olds, justice of the Indiana Supreme Court
- Edwin Taylor Pollock, United States Navy Captain
- Dawn Powell, satirical author
- Samuel Snider, U.S. Representative from Minnesota
- Lefty Webb, baseball player for the Pittsburgh Pirates
- Samuel Newitt Wood, Kansas state legislator
