= Morrow County Courthouse (Ohio) =

Local government building in the United States

- Morrow County Courthouse And Jail
- U.S. National Register of Historic Places
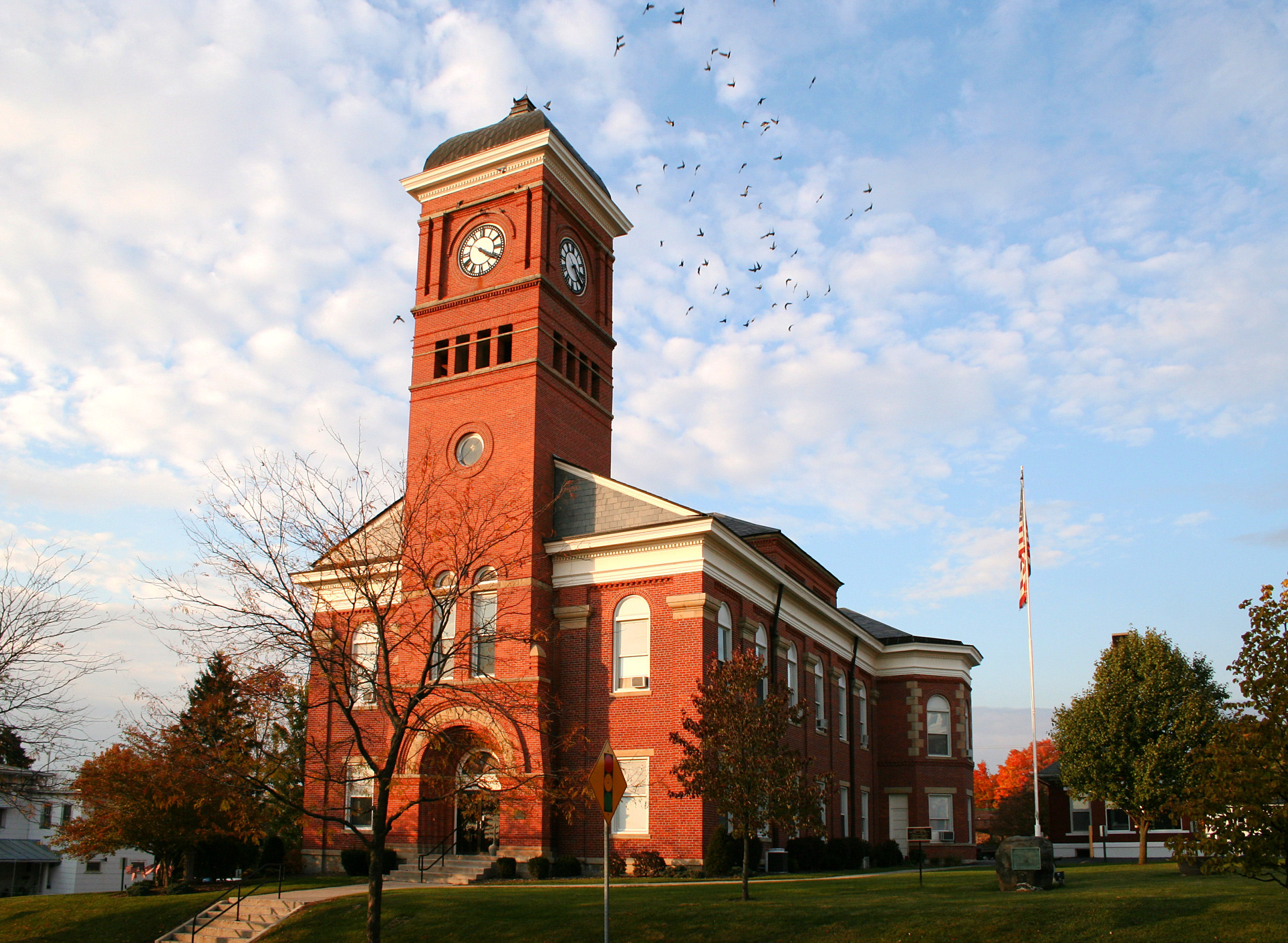
- Front and eastern side

- Location within Ohio Location within the United States
- Interactive map showing the location of Morrow County Courthouse
- Location: Courthouse Sq., Mount Gilead, Ohio
- Coordinates: 40°32′57″N 82°49′37″W
- Area: 2 acres (0.81 ha)
- Built: 1852
- Architect: David Auld; Auld & Miller
- Architectural style: Greek Revival
- NRHP reference No.: 74001586
- Added to NRHP: July 25, 1974

The Morrow County Courthouse is a historic government building in the village of Mount Gilead, Ohio, United States. Constructed in the middle of the nineteenth century, it has served as the county courthouse since Morrow County's earliest years, and it has been named a historic site.

== History ==
One of Ohio's youngest counties, Morrow County was organized in 1848 to relieve local residents: its land had previously been part of five different counties, and the residents experienced substantial difficulty in participating in county government because the distance to all five county seats was excessive. Incorporated in 1839, Mount Gilead has been the county seat for Morrow County since its formation. Foreseeing the possibility that a new county would be created, the inhabitants improved their village's public spaces in the late 1840s. Accordingly, the county courts and county commissioners undertook their business in the village, fulfilling their duties in assorted buildings because of the lack of a dedicated courthouse: the law that organized the county provided that $7,000 (then a large sum) must be donated by private citizens or that two years must pass without the donation of $7,000 before county officials might levy taxes for the erection of a courthouse and jail. Most county offices were located in a long two-story frame house, which stood on the two lots where the courthouse now stands, although the county courts met in the Baptist Church. By mid-1849, the necessary funds had been raised, and on 7 July 1849 the county commissioners began advertising for bids for a jail building, which was completed somewhat more than a year later. More than two years passed before the commissioners were ready to construct a courthouse: they began advertising for bids in March 1852, and the project was officially completed on 15 July 1854. In its early years, the courthouse served a wide variety of community purposes: for example, the county's first medical association was formed at the courthouse in 1850, the Universalist church worshipped in the courtroom until 1861, and the village spelling bee was held at the courthouse in the 1870s.

By 1880, the architecture of the 1850s had fallen into disfavor: a county history published in that year noted that the courthouse "possess[ed], however, little beauty or modern appearance" and suggested that county money be spent on "modernizing the ungainly structure." Sixteen years passed before any substantial changes were made; in 1896, the building was expanded, and the facade was modified with some modernizing changes, but the building's basic plan remained. The next substantial change occurred during the Great Depression of the 1930s: the increasing availability of federal money prompted local officials to apply for and receive a grant, with which they again modified the building's appearance and added a new courtroom inside a new wing on the building's rear. No substantial changes have been made since that time.

== Architecture ==
Built of brick on a stone foundation, the courthouse is covered with a slate roof and features elements of wood and stone. Before the modernization of 1896, the facade included a small cupola and a pediment with a fanlight, resembling somewhat the present appearance of the Highland County Courthouse in Hillsboro, and a Doric column on each side of the two-story entrance, similar to the present-day Knox County Courthouse in Mount Vernon. Today, the pediment is pierced by a large tower, a later addition that occupies the place of the cupola; a prominent clock appears on all four sides of the tower, and a bell is placed inside. The interior is accessed through the southern (front) facade, with a rounded arch entrance in place of the original Greek Revival design, but some elements of the original design remain: for example, numerous pilasters on the walls once concealed the building's many chimneys, and certain parts of the second story of the interior, left unchanged by construction, depict all three stages of the courthouse's history. At the top of the building, a cornice and a plain frieze crown the walls, while a finial and pagoda-shaped roof sit at the peak of the fifty-foot tower.

== Preservation ==
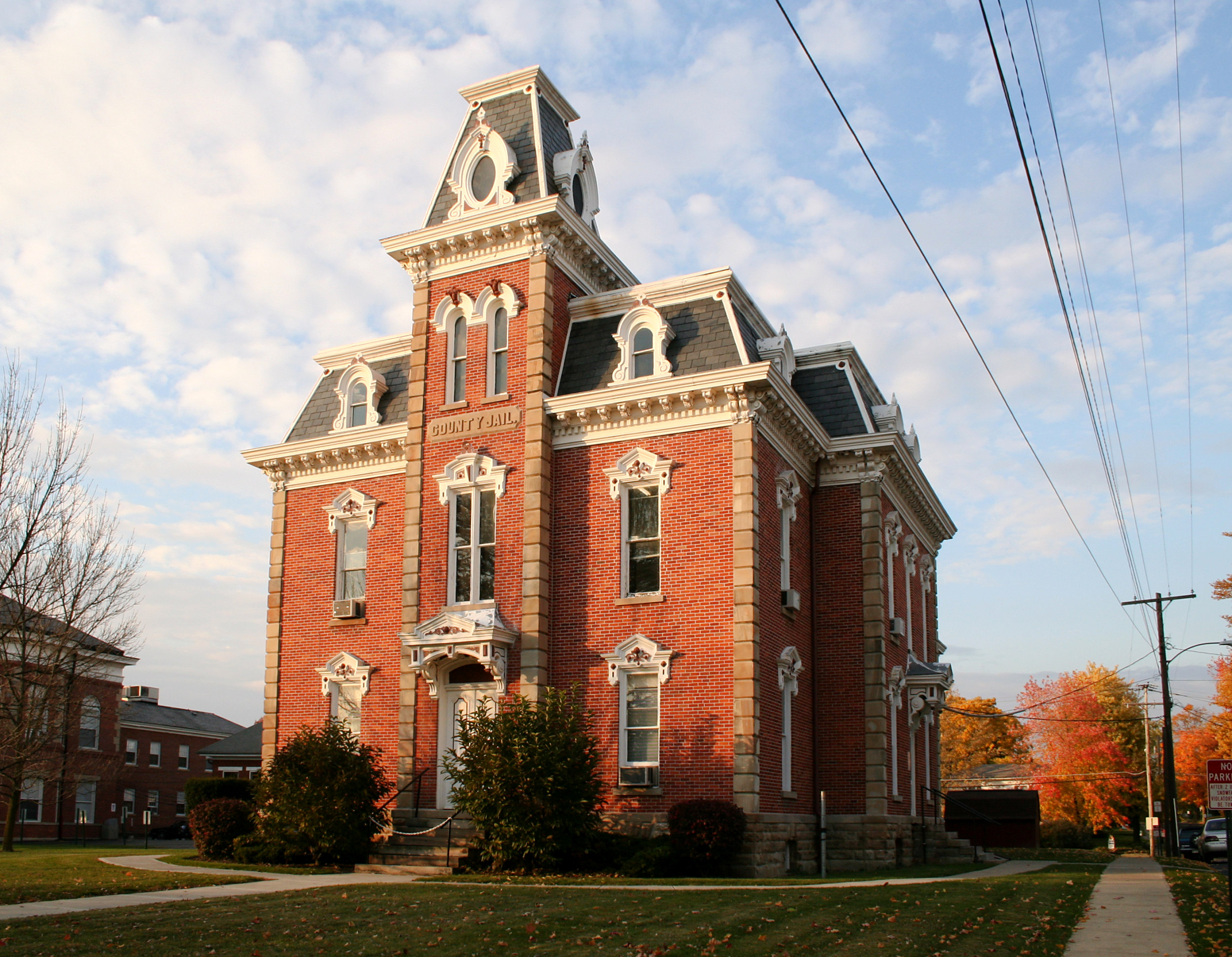
1850 jail (modified extensively since construction)

More than a century and a half old, the Morrow County Courthouse remains in use for its original purposes: no organizations except for local government operate within its walls, and the Morrow County and Mount Gilead village courts continue to meet in its courtrooms. In 1974, the courthouse and 1850 county jail were listed on the National Register of Historic Places together, qualifying because of their distinctive historic architecture.
