= Chesterville, Ohio =

- Village
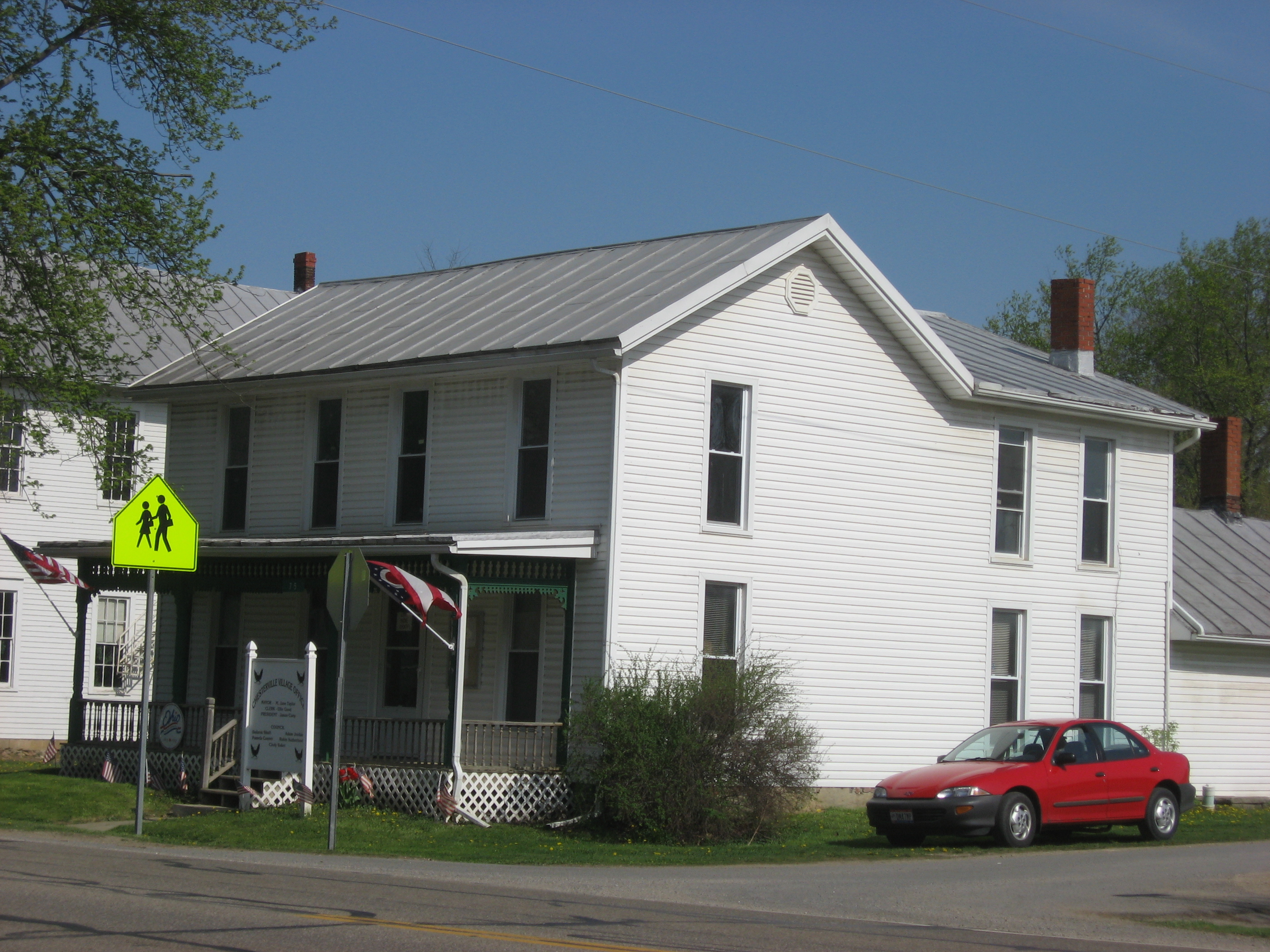
- Village hall

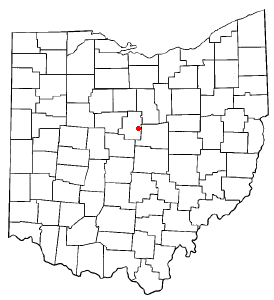
- Location of Chesterville, Ohio

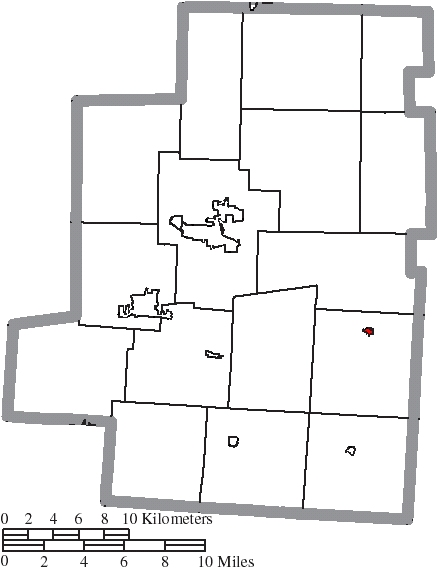
- Location of Chesterville in Morrow County
- Coordinates: 40°28′40″N 82°40′54″W
- Country: United States
- State: Ohio
- County: Morrow
- Township: Chester

Area
  - Total: 0.21 sq mi (0.55 km^{2})
  - Land: 0.20 sq mi (0.53 km^{2})
  - Water: 0.0077 sq mi (0.02 km^{2})
- Elevation: 1,112 ft (339 m)

Population (2020)
  - Total: 191
  - Estimate (2023): 195
  - Density: 933.7/sq mi (360.52/km^{2})
- Time zone: UTC-5 (Eastern (EST))
  - Summer (DST): UTC-4 (EDT)
- ZIP code: 43317
- Area code: 419
- FIPS code: 39-14114
- GNIS feature ID: 2397619
- Website: http://www.thevillageofchesterville.com/

Chesterville is a village in Morrow County, Ohio, United States, along the Kokosing River. The population was 191 at the 2020 census. Chesterville is southeast of Mount Gilead, the county seat.

== History ==
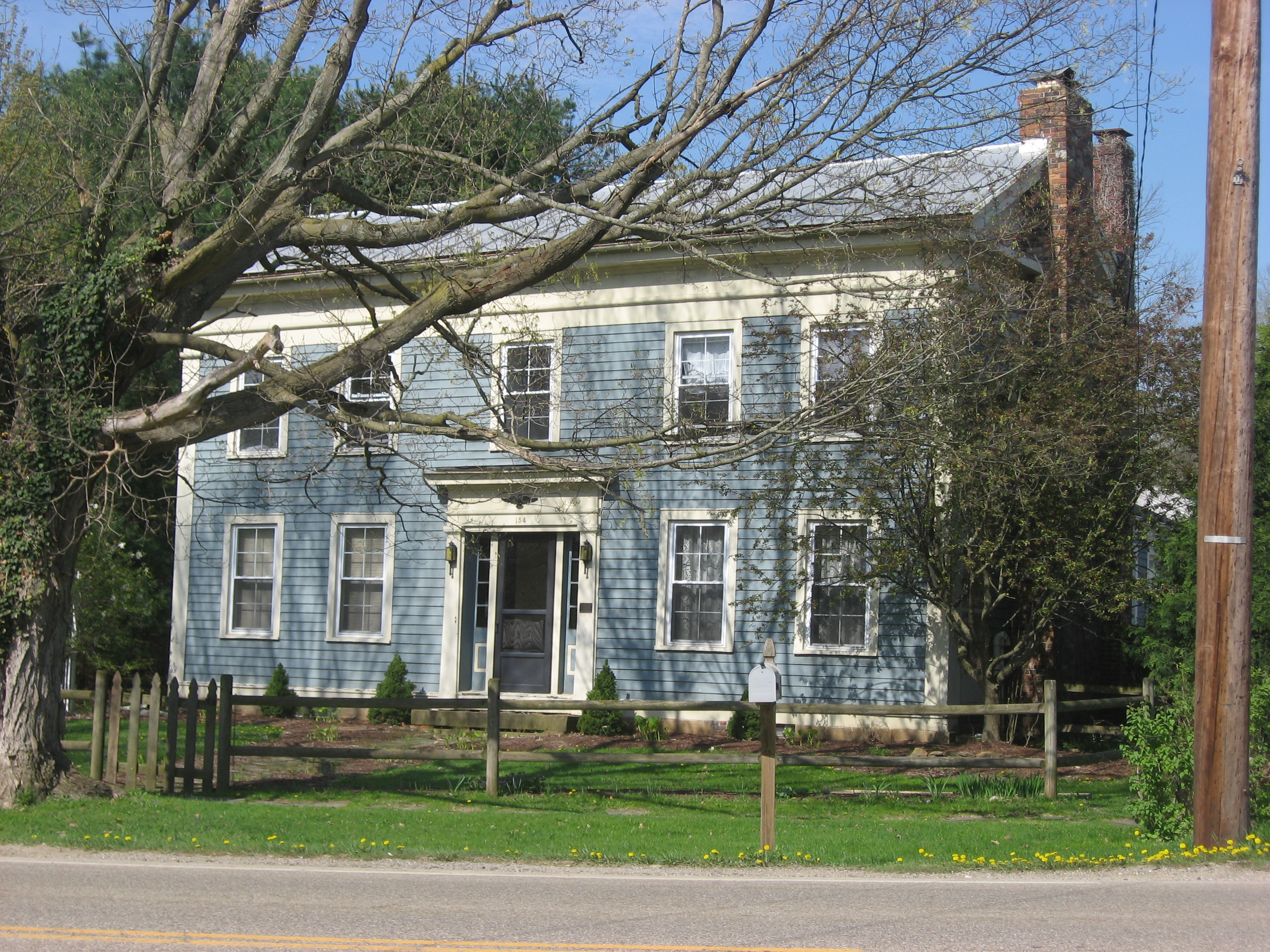
Enos Miles House, built in the 1830s

Chesterville was laid out in 1829, and named after Chester Township. A post office was established at Chesterville in 1832.

== Geography ==
Chesterville is considered to be a part of "Central Ohio".

According to the United States Census Bureau, the village has a total area of 0.22 square miles (0.57 km^{2}), of which, 0.21 square miles (0.54 km^{2}) is land and 0.01 square miles (0.03 km^{2}) is water.

== Demographics ==
Historical population
Census	Pop.	Note	%±
1850	407		—
1860	1,563		284.0%
1870	282		−82.0%
1880	266		−5.7%
1890	268		0.8%
1900	230		−14.2%
1910	229		−0.4%
1920	155		−32.3%
1930	184		18.7%
1940	188		2.2%
1950	208		10.6%
1960	275		32.2%
1970	264		−4.0%
1980	242		−8.3%
1990	286		18.2%
2000	193		−32.5%
2010	228		18.1%
2020	191		−16.2%
2023 (est.)	195	▲	2.1%
U.S. Decennial Census

=== 2010 census ===
As of the census of 2010, there were 228 people, 79 households, and 50 families living in the village. The population density was 1,085.7 inhabitants per square mile (419.2/km^{2}). There were 83 housing units at an average density of 395.2 per square mile (152.6/km^{2}). The racial makeup of the village was 97.8% White and 2.2% from two or more races. Hispanic or Latino of any race were 0.4% of the population.

There were 79 households, of which 38.0% had children under the age of 18 living with them, 38.0% were married couples living together, 16.5% had a female householder with no husband present, 8.9% had a male householder with no wife present, and 36.7% were non-families. 26.6% of all households were made up of individuals, and 12.7% had someone living alone who was 65 years of age or older. The average household size was 2.56 and the average family size was 2.98.

The median age in the village was 40.5 years. 25.4% of residents were under the age of 18; 5.3% were between the ages of 18 and 24; 23.7% were from 25 to 44; 25.5% were from 45 to 64; and 20.2% were 65 years of age or older. The gender makeup of the village was 45.6% male and 54.4% female.

=== 2000 census ===
As of the census of 2000, there were 193 people, 57 households, and 42 families living in the village. The population density was 2,036.6 inhabitants per square mile (786.3/km^{2}). There were 61 housing units at an average density of 643.7 per square mile (248.5/km^{2}). The racial makeup of the village was 96.89% White, 1.04% Native American, and 2.07% from two or more races. Hispanic or Latino of any race were 1.04% of the population.

There were 57 households, out of which 47.4% had children under the age of 18 living with them, 59.6% were married couples living together, 8.8% had a female householder with no husband present, and 26.3% were non-families. 19.3% of all households were made up of individuals, and 14.0% had someone living alone who was 65 years of age or older. The average household size was 2.75 and the average family size was 3.10.

In the village, the population was spread out, with 24.9% under the age of 18, 5.7% from 18 to 24, 29.0% from 25 to 44, 14.0% from 45 to 64, and 26.4% who were 65 years of age or older. The median age was 40 years. For every 100 females there were 73.9 males. For every 100 females age 18 and over, there were 64.8 males.

The median income for a household in the village was $41,667, and the median income for a family was $40,833. Males had a median income of $32,143 versus $21,023 for females. The per capita income for the village was $13,318. About 9.3% of families and 9.9% of the population were below the poverty line, including 12.5% of those under the age of eighteen and none of those 65 or over.

== Notable residents ==
- James A. Connolly, U.S. representative from Illinois
- Hugh Dillman, actor and real estate executive
