= Ohio State Route 656 =

State highway in central Ohio, US

State Route 656

Route information
- Maintained by ODOT
- Length: 10.07 mi (16.21 km)
- Existed: 1937–present

Major junctions
- South end: SR 61 near Sunbury
- North end: SR 229 / CR 19 near Sparta

Location
- Country: United States
- State: Ohio
- Counties: Delaware, Morrow

Highway system
- Ohio State Highway System; Interstate; US; State; Scenic
← SR 655	→ SR 657

State Route 656 (SR 656) is a state highway in the central portion of the U.S. state of Ohio. The highway's southern terminus is at SR 61 approximately 4.5 miles (7.2 km) north of Sunbury. It travels northeast to its junction with SR 229, less than 0.25 miles (0.40 km) northeast of the village limits of Sparta.

== Route description ==
SR 656 travels through northeastern Delaware County and southeastern Morrow County. No part of the route is inclusive within the National Highway System.

== History ==
This state highway was designated in 1937 along the alignment that it utilizes to this day between SR 61 and SR 229. SR 656 has not experienced any major changes to its routing since its inception.

== Major intersections ==
County	Location	mi	km	Destinations	Notes
Delaware	Kingston Township	0.00	0.00	SR 61 / Wilson Road	
Delaware	Porter Township	1.07	1.72	SR 521 west / CR 52 (Olive Green Road)	Eastern terminus of SR 521
Morrow	Sparta	9.71	15.63	SR 314	
Morrow	South Bloomfield Township	10.07	16.21	SR 229 / CR 19 – Marengo, Mount Vernon	
1.000 mi = 1.609 km; 1.000 km = 0.621 mi
