= Ohio State Route 521 =

State highway in Delaware County, Ohio, US

State Route 521

Route information
- Maintained by ODOT
- Length: 13.62 mi (21.92 km)
- Existed: 1937–present

Major junctions
- West end: SR 37 in Delaware
- US 23 / US 36 / US 42 / SR 37 in Delaware
- East end: SR 656 / CR 52 in Olive Green

Location
- Country: United States
- State: Ohio
- Counties: Delaware

Highway system
- Ohio State Highway System; Interstate; US; State; Scenic
← SR 520	→ SR 522

State Route 521 (SR 521) is an east–west state highway in central Ohio. Existing entirely within Delaware County, the western terminus of SR 521 is at SR 37 in Delaware. Its eastern terminus is at SR 656 in the hamlet of Olive Green, located approximately five miles (8.0 km) north of Sunbury.

== Route description ==
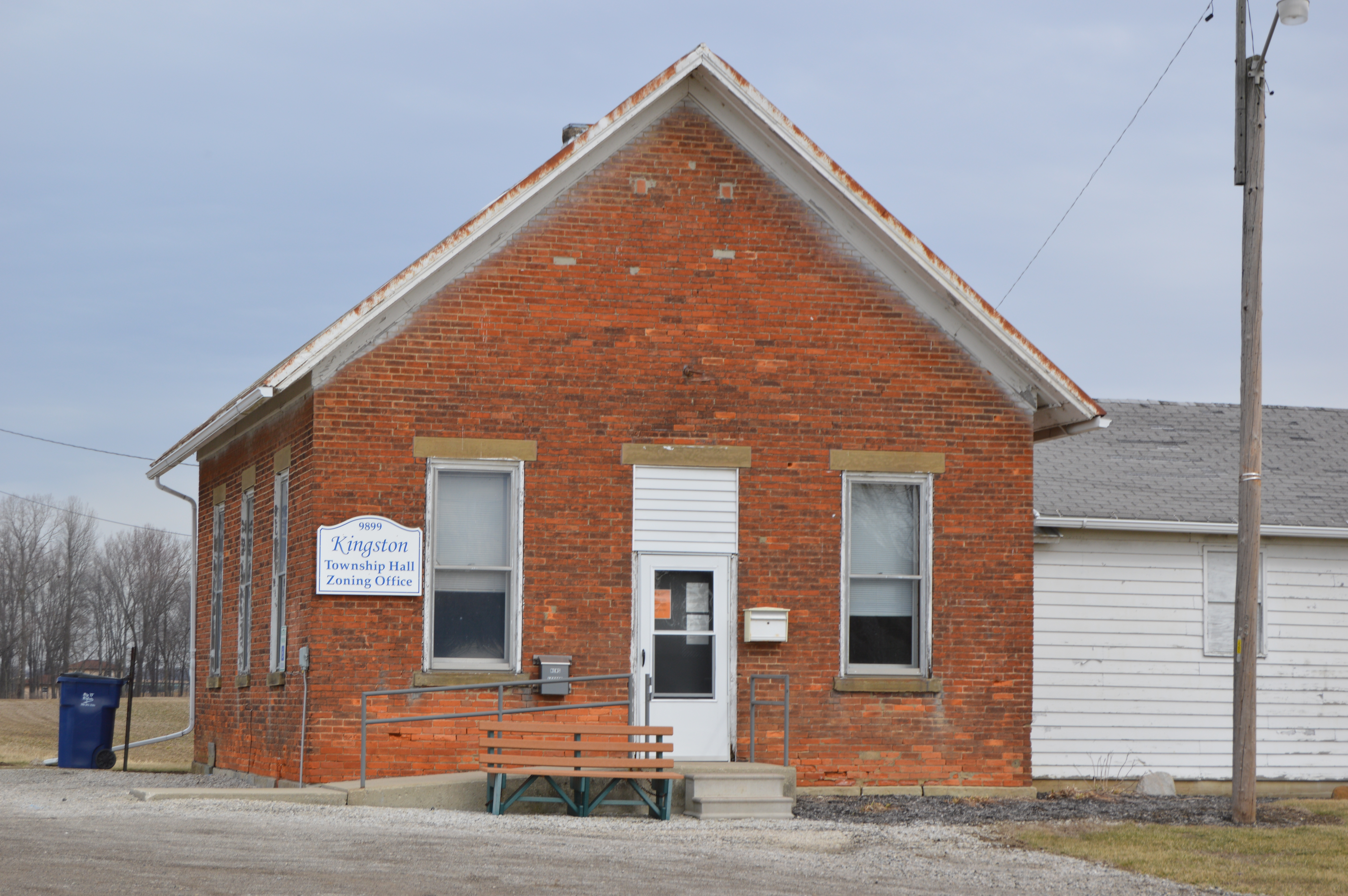
Kingston Township hall, east of Kilbourne

The Ohio Department of Transportation defines SR 521 as beginning at the intersection of SR 37/Central Avenue and Sandusky Street in downtown Delaware. SR 521 follows Sandusky Street south two blocks to U.S. Route 36 (US 36) or William Street, and then following US 36 easterly through Delaware, passes the partial interchange with US 23, across the Olentangy River along the brief concurrency US 36 has with US 42. Beyond this point, SR 37 converges with the SR 521 and US 36 at a signalized intersection on the east side of the city. The three highways run together until another signalized intersection where SR 521 breaks off towards the northeast. This 1.76-mile (2.83 km) stretch of SR 521 is not explicitly signed in the field.

The aforementioned signalized intersection with US 36/SR 37 on the east side of Delaware marks the start of the signed portion of SR 521. The state highway departs the city of Delaware heading northeast into Brown Township amid a vastness of open farmland and the occasional home, passing underneath the CSX railway prior to passing T-intersections with Harris Road and Skinner Road. At the County Home Road intersection, SR 521 turns east, and enters the hamlet of Kilbourne, where it passes amid some homes and businesses, as well as intersects Old State Road. East of there, SR 521 passes through woodlands as it crosses over Alum Creek and passes its intersection with Hogback Road. As it re-enters primarily open farmland, SR 521 passes Kilbourne Road, then follows an S-curve to the southeast. Resuming an easterly trek, after passing the unusually-named 3 Bs & K Road, SR 521 crosses into Kingston Township. Next, the state highway crosses Galena Road, then passes over Interstate 71 without an interchange. Continuing east through farm country and passing the occasional house, State Route 521 passes through intersections with Carter's Corners Road and Blue Church Road, then turns to the east-southeast prior to entering Porter Township and arriving at its junction with SR 61. Heading due from SR 61, SR 521 passes through a forested landscape, and crosses the Big Walnut Creek prior to coming to an end in the hamlet of Olive Green at the SR 656 intersection. Continuing to the east of SR 656 after SR 521 terminates is Olive Green Road.

The portion of SR 521 concurrent with US 36 east of US 23 is included within the National Highway System.

== History ==
SR 521 was established in 1937 along the routing that it occupies to this day, and has not seen any significant changes since its inception.

== Major intersections ==
The entire route is in Delaware County.

Location	mi	km	Destinations	Notes
Delaware	0.00	0.00	SR 37 (Central Avenue) to US 23 north / North Sandusky Street	Western terminus (designated)
Delaware	0.18	0.29	US 36 west (West William Street) / South Sandusky Street	Western end of US 36 concurrency
Delaware	0.42	0.68	US 23 / US 42 south	Interchange; western end of US 42 concurrency
Delaware	0.65	1.05	US 42 north (Lake Street) to US 23 north	Eastern end of US 42 concurrency
Delaware	1.25	2.01	SR 37 west (East Central Avenue) to US 23 / US 42 north	Western end of SR 37 concurrency
Delaware	1.76	2.83	US 36 / SR 37 east (Sunbury Road) to I-71	Eastern end of US 36 / SR 37 concurrency; western terminus (signed)
Porter Township	12.91	20.78	SR 61 – Sunbury, Mount Gilead	
Porter Township	13.62	21.92	SR 656 / CR 52 (Olive Green Road)	Eastern terminus
1.000 mi = 1.609 km; 1.000 km = 0.621 mi: Concurrency terminus
