= Oxford Township, Ohio =

Oxford Township, Ohio may refer to:

- Oxford Township, Butler County, Ohio
- Oxford Township, Coshocton County, Ohio
- Oxford Township, Delaware County, Ohio
- Oxford Township, Erie County, Ohio
- Oxford Township, Guernsey County, Ohio
- Oxford Township, Tuscarawas County, Ohio

== See also ==
- Oxford Township (disambiguation)
