= Marlboro Township =

Marlboro Township may refer to:

- Marlboro Township, New Jersey
- Marlboro Township, Delaware County, Ohio
- Marlboro Township, Stark County, Ohio
