= Marlboro Township, Ohio =

Marlboro Township, Ohio may refer to:

- Marlboro Township, Delaware County, Ohio
- Marlboro Township, Stark County, Ohio
