= Oxford Township =

Oxford Township may refer to:

== Canada ==
- Oxford Township, now part of North Grenville, Ontario
- Oxford Township, Oxford County, Ontario

== United States ==
=== Illinois ===
- Oxford Township, Henry County, Illinois

=== Iowa ===
- Oxford Township, Johnson County, Iowa
- Oxford Township, Jones County, Iowa

=== Kansas ===
- Oxford Township, Johnson County, Kansas
- Oxford Township, Sumner County, Kansas, in Sumner County, Kansas

=== Michigan ===
- Oxford Charter Township, Michigan

=== Minnesota ===
- Oxford Township, Isanti County, Minnesota

=== New Jersey ===
- Oxford Township, New Jersey

=== North Carolina ===
- Oxford Township, Granville County, North Carolina, in Granville County, North Carolina

=== Ohio ===
- Oxford Township, Butler County, Ohio
- Oxford Township, Coshocton County, Ohio
- Oxford Township, Delaware County, Ohio
- Oxford Township, Erie County, Ohio
- Oxford Township, Guernsey County, Ohio
- Oxford Township, Tuscarawas County, Ohio

=== Pennsylvania ===
- Oxford Township, Adams County, Pennsylvania
- Oxford Township, Philadelphia County, Pennsylvania

=== South Dakota ===
- Oxford Township, Hamlin County, South Dakota, in Hamlin County, South Dakota
