= Westfield Township, Ohio =

Westfield Township, Ohio may refer to:

- Westfield Township, Medina County, Ohio
- Westfield Township, Morrow County, Ohio
