= Steiners Corner, Ohio =

Coordinates: 40°28′53″N 82°49′14″W

Steiners Corner is a ghost town in Lincoln Township, Morrow County, in the U.S. state of Ohio.

== History ==
The town was named for William Steiner, a pioneer settler. Steiner "built his cabin on the Sunbury road, a little south of where the Cardington and Chesterville pike crosses this road".
