= Richard Dillingham =

American activist

- Born: June 18, 1823; Peru Township, Morrow County, Ohio, U.S.
- Died: June 23, 1850 (aged 27); Nashville, Tennessee, U.S.
- Occupations: School teacher, abolitionist

Richard Dillingham (June 18, 1823 – June 30, 1850) was a Quaker school teacher from Peru Township in what is now Morrow County, Ohio, U.S., who was arrested in Tennessee on December 5, 1848, while aiding the attempted escape of three slaves. Tried April 12, 1849, he was sentenced to three years in the Tennessee State Penitentiary in Nashville. He died there of cholera.

Dillingham was celebrated as a martyr to the abolitionist cause by novelist Harriet Beecher Stowe, fellow Quaker Levi Coffin and the poet John Greenleaf Whittier, who wrote the poem The Cross in Dillingham's honor.

In his Memoir of Richard Dillingham, Levi Coffin describes Dillingham's arrest:

In December, 1848, being then in Cincinnati, he was earnestly solicited by some non-white people to go to Nashville, Tennessee, and bring away their relations who were slaves there, under a hard master. He undertook the project, though fully conscious that he encountered great danger. Reaching Nashville, he made himself known to the slaves whom he had come to rescue, and made private arrangements with them about escaping. At the appointed time the party left the city, the three slaves being in a hack, which Dillingham had hired, with a free non-white man who acted as driver. Dillingham himself was on horseback. The way to freedom and safety seemed open, but treachery thwarted all their plans. A non-white man in whom Dillingham had confided, betrayed him–through what motive, it is not known--and the whole party were arrested when they reached the bridge across the Cumberland river.

Tried and convicted for "Negro stealing," Dillingham was given the minimum sentence of three years. Levi Coffin's Memoir relates what happened next:

Richard Dillingham was transferred from the county jail to the penitentiary, and put to hard labor, namely, sawing rock. He was allowed to write to his friends but once in three months, and his letters were inspected by the warden. His health suffered, and he became despondent. After nine months' imprisonment he was made steward of the penitentiary hospital, a post which he filled to the satisfaction of the prison officials. In the summer of 1850, the cholera broke out among the inmates of the penitentiary, and many died. Richard Dillingham dealt out medicines, and was unwearied in his attentions to his fellow prisoners, many of whom he saw die and be buried in one day. At last the solemn message came to him. One Sabbath morning he was attacked with cholera; he died at two o'clock, p. m., and was buried at half past three.

The exact location of Dillingham's grave is not known. He was buried in a cemetery on the prison grounds. The site was built over in the course of Nashville's later urban development.

== Notes and references ==
- The Key to Uncle Tom's Cabin by Harriet Beecher Stowe (See pp. 101–108.)
- A.L. Benedict, Memoir of Richard Dillingham, Philadelphia: Merrihew and Thompson, Printers, 1852. (Full text facsimile from HathiTrust Digital Library)
  - Full text facsimile from Samuel J. May Anti-Slavery Collection, Cornell University ISBN 1-4297-1672-X (Cornell University Library Digital Collections reprint)
- Wilbur H. Seibert, The Underground Railroad from Slavery to Freedom, New York: Macmillan Co., 1898, pp. 174-175.
