= Cardington, Ohio =

- Village
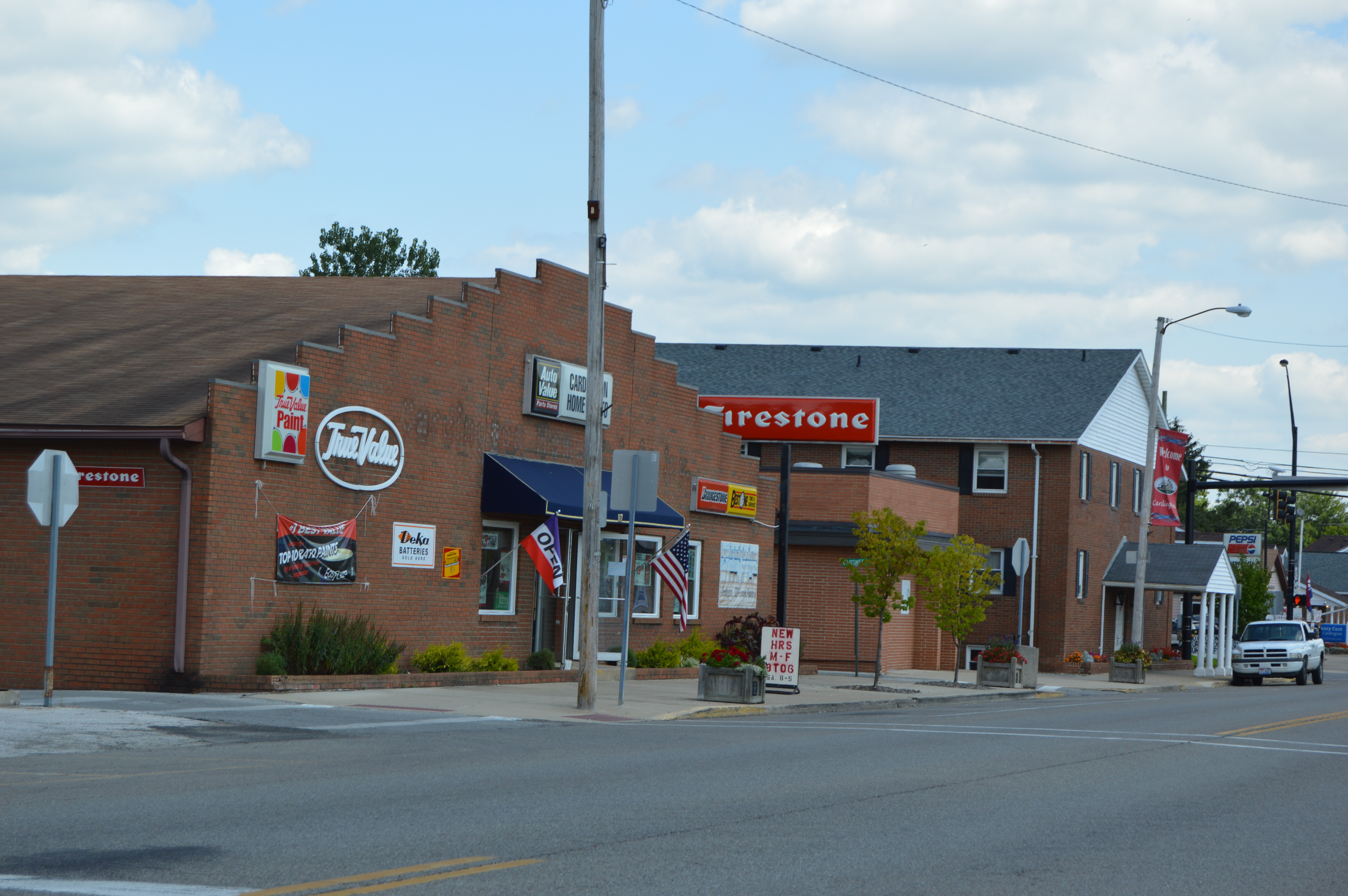
- Main Street

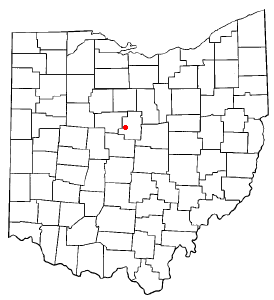
- Location of Cardington, Ohio

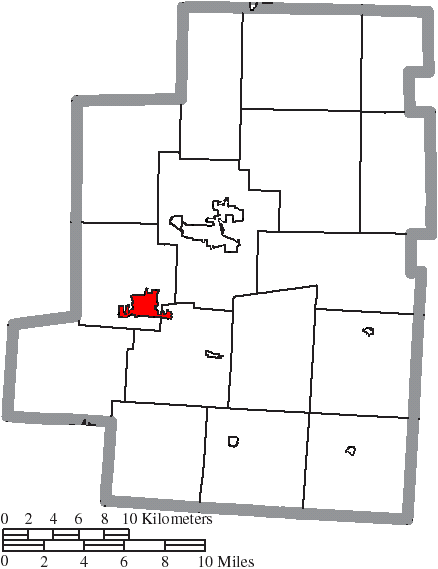
- Location of Cardington in Morrow County
- Coordinates: 40°29′53″N 82°53′33″W
- Country: United States
- State: Ohio
- County: Morrow
- Township: Cardington, Lincoln

Area
  - Total: 2.01 sq mi (5.20 km^{2})
  - Land: 2.01 sq mi (5.20 km^{2})
  - Water: 0 sq mi (0.00 km^{2})
- Elevation: 1,014 ft (309 m)

Population (2020)
  - Total: 2,079
  - Estimate (2023): 2,101
  - Density: 1,036/sq mi (400.1/km^{2})
- Time zone: UTC-5 (Eastern (EST))
  - Summer (DST): UTC-4 (EDT)
- ZIP code: 43315
- Area code: 419
- FIPS code: 39-12084
- GNIS feature ID: 2397552
- Website: www.cardington.org

Cardington is a village in Morrow County, Ohio, United States. The population was 2,051 at the 2020 census. Mount Gilead, Ohio, the county seat, is located northeast of Cardington on U.S. Route 42.

== History ==
A post office called Cardington was established in 1827. Cardington was named for the first industrial tool the town had, the carding machine. The village itself was founded in 1836.

A series of tornadoes on June 11 and 13, 1981, each killing four people, destroyed a significant portion of the village.

== Geography ==
Cardington is considered to be a part of "Central Ohio".

According to the United States Census Bureau, the village has a total area of 2.01 square miles (5.21 km^{2}), all of it land.

== Demographics ==
Historical population
Census	Pop.	Note	%±
1850	292		—
1860	846		189.7%
1870	918		8.5%
1880	1,365		48.7%
1890	1,428		4.6%
1900	1,354		−5.2%
1910	1,349		−0.4%
1920	1,109		−17.8%
1930	1,192		7.5%
1940	1,304		9.4%
1950	1,465		12.3%
1960	1,613		10.1%
1970	1,730		7.3%
1980	1,665		−3.8%
1990	1,770		6.3%
2000	1,849		4.5%
2010	2,047		10.7%
2020	2,079		1.6%
2023 (est.)	2,101	▲	1.1%
U.S. Decennial Census

=== 2010 census ===
As of the census of 2010, there were 2,047 people, 792 households, and 526 families living in the village. The population density was 1,018.4 inhabitants per square mile (393.2/km^{2}). There were 911 housing units at an average density of 453.2 per square mile (175.0/km^{2}). The racial makeup of the village was 97.9% White, 0.1% African American, 0.2% Asian, 0.4% from other races, and 1.3% from two or more races. Hispanic or Latino of any race were 0.8% of the population.

There were 792 households, of which 42.3% had children under the age of 18 living with them, 42.6% were married couples living together, 18.4% had a female householder with no husband present, 5.4% had a male householder with no wife present, and 33.6% were non-families. 28.2% of all households were made up of individuals, and 9% had someone living alone who was 65 years of age or older. The average household size was 2.57 and the average family size was 3.13.

The median age in the village was 33.5 years. 30.6% of residents were under the age of 18; 8.5% were between the ages of 18 and 24; 27.8% were from 25 to 44; 23% were from 45 to 64; and 10% were 65 years of age or older. The gender makeup of the village was 48.2% male and 51.8% female.

=== 2000 census ===
As of the census of 2000, there were 1,849 people, 754 households, and 486 families living in the village. The population density was 992.2 inhabitants per square mile (383.1/km^{2}). There were 804 housing units at an average density of 431.4 per square mile (166.6/km^{2}). The racial makeup of the village was 98.22% White, 0.32% African American, 0.32% Native American, 0.05% Asian, 0.32% from other races, and 0.76% from two or more races. Hispanic or Latino of any race were 0.22% of the population.

There were 754 households, out of which 34.1% had children under the age of 18 living with them, 45.6% were married couples living together, 14.3% had a female householder with no husband present, and 35.5% were non-families. 30.0% of all households were made up of individuals, and 11.7% had someone living alone who was 65 years of age or older. The average household size was 2.45 and the average family size was 3.06.

In the village, the population was spread out, with 28.4% under the age of 18, 8.8% from 18 to 24, 29.5% from 25 to 44, 21.6% from 45 to 64, and 11.6% who were 65 years of age or older. The median age was 33 years. For every 100 females there were 91.6 males. For every 100 females age 18 and over, there were 84.3 males.

The median income for a household in the village was $30,500, and the median income for a family was $36,823. Males had a median income of $31,483 versus $21,141 for females. The per capita income for the village was $14,057. About 16.5% of families and 16.7% of the population were below the poverty line, including 22.1% of those under age 18 and 7.2% of those age 65 or over.

== Education ==
The Cardington-Lincoln Local School District includes the Cardington-Lincoln High School.

== Notable people ==
- Thad H. Brown, Ohio Secretary of State from 1923 to 1927.
- Wesley Goodman, Ohio State Representative.
