= Troy Township, Ohio =

Troy Township, Ohio may refer to:

- Troy Township, Ashland County, Ohio
- Troy Township, Athens County, Ohio
- Troy Township, Delaware County, Ohio
- Troy Township, Geauga County, Ohio
- Troy Township, Morrow County, Ohio
- Troy Township, Richland County, Ohio
- Troy Township, Wood County, Ohio

== See also ==
- Troy Township (disambiguation)
