= Lincoln Township, Morrow County, Ohio =

Township in Ohio, US

- Township
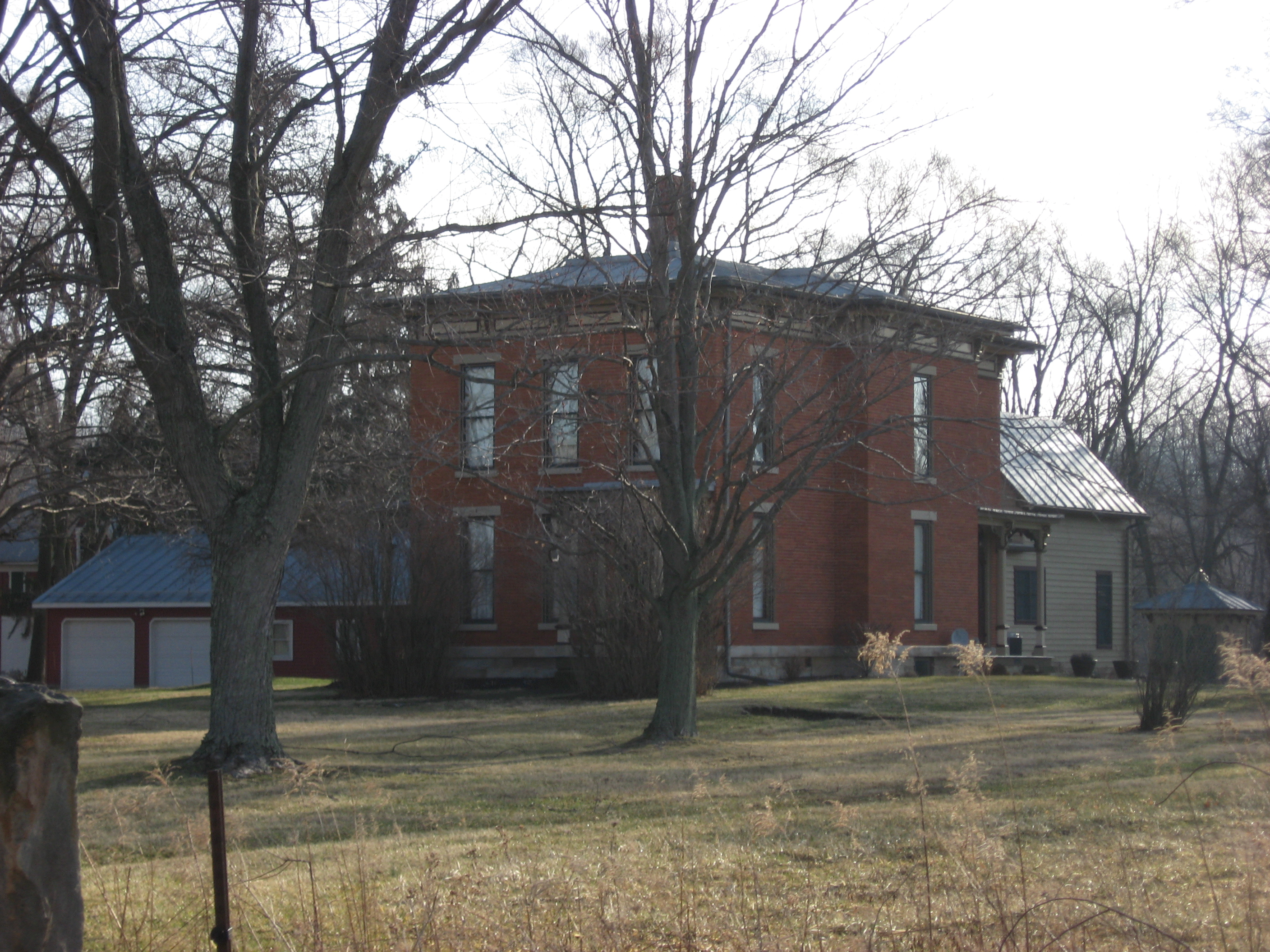
- Samuel P. Brown House, built 1880

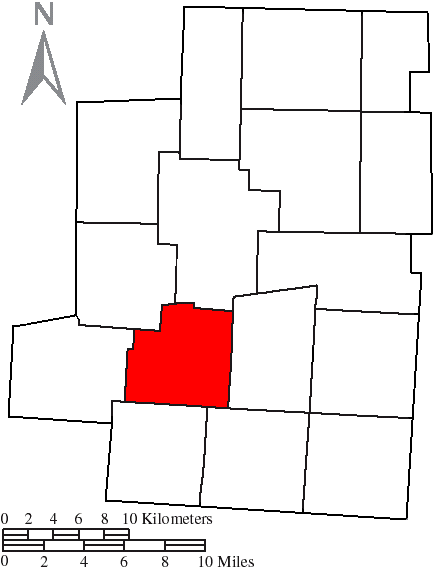
- Location of Lincoln Township in Morrow County
- Coordinates: 40°27′32″N 82°50′59″W
- Country: United States
- State: Ohio
- County: Morrow

Area
  - Total: 22.9 sq mi (59.3 km^{2})
  - Land: 22.9 sq mi (59.3 km^{2})
  - Water: 0 sq mi (0.0 km^{2})
- Elevation: 1,060 ft (323 m)

Population (2020)
  - Total: 2,040
  - Density: 89.1/sq mi (34.4/km^{2})
- Time zone: UTC-5 (Eastern (EST))
  - Summer (DST): UTC-4 (EDT)
- FIPS code: 39-43680
- GNIS feature ID: 1086705
- Website: https://www.lincolntwp.us/

Lincoln Township is one of the sixteen townships of Morrow County, Ohio, United States. The 2020 census found 2,040 people in the township, 250 of whom lived in the village of Fulton.

== Geography ==
Located in the southwestern part of the county, it borders the following townships:

- Gilead Township - north
- Harmony Township - east
- Bennington Township - southeast
- Peru Township - south
- Westfield Township - west
- Cardington Township - northwest

Two villages are located in Lincoln Township: part of Cardington in the northwest, and Fulton in the east.

== Name and history ==
Lincoln Township was organized in 1828. The township was named for Benjamin Lincoln (1733–1810), a general in the American Revolutionary War. It is the only Lincoln Township statewide.

== Government ==
The township is governed by a three-member board of trustees, who are elected in November of odd-numbered years to a four-year term beginning on the following January 1. Two are elected in the year after the presidential election and one is elected in the year before it. There is also an elected township fiscal officer, who serves a four-year term beginning on April 1 of the year after the election, which is held in November of the year before the presidential election. Vacancies in the fiscal officership or on the board of trustees are filled by the remaining trustees.
