= Peru Township, Morrow County, Ohio =

Township in Ohio, US

- Township
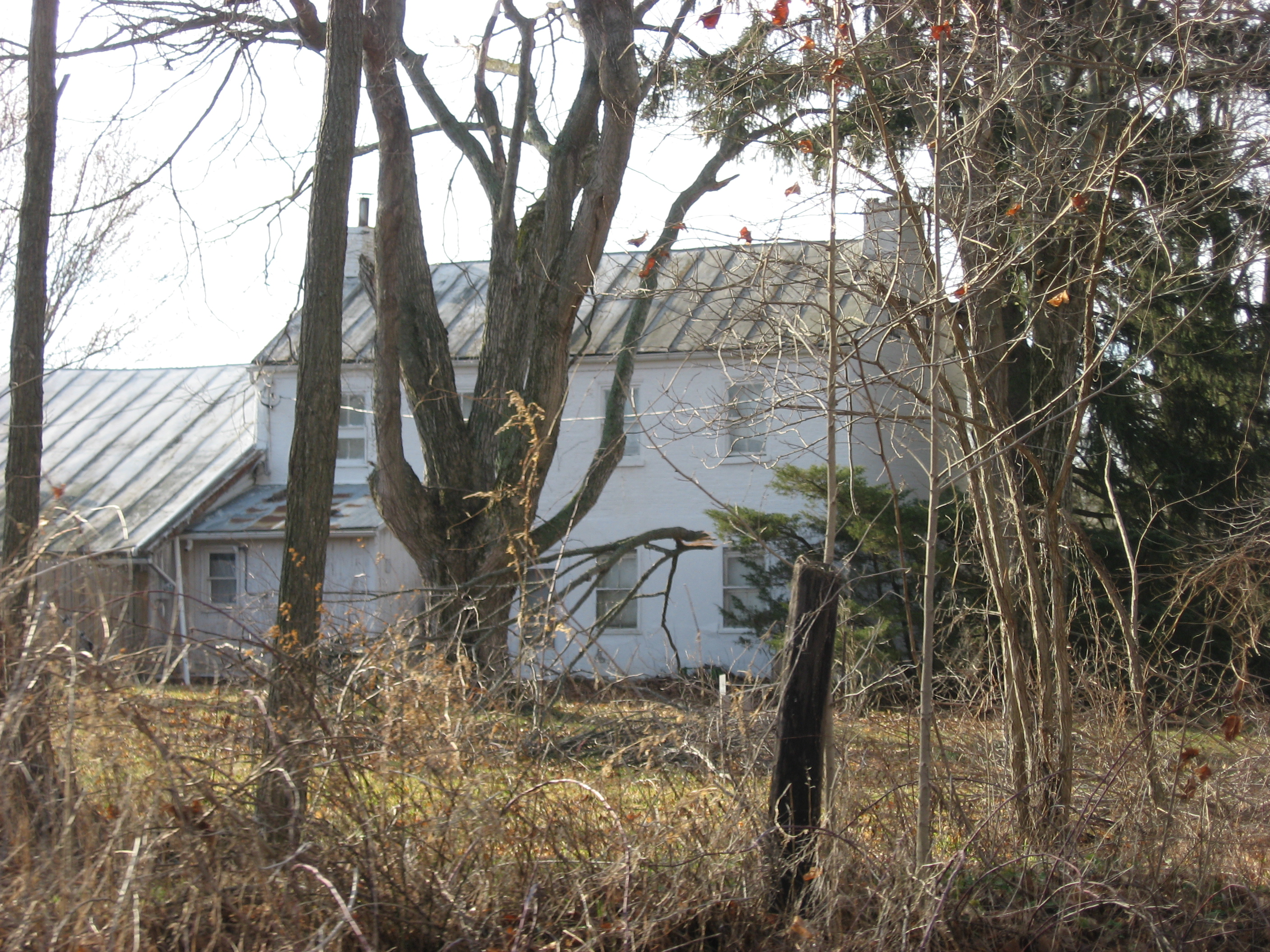
- The Reuben Benedict House, built 1828

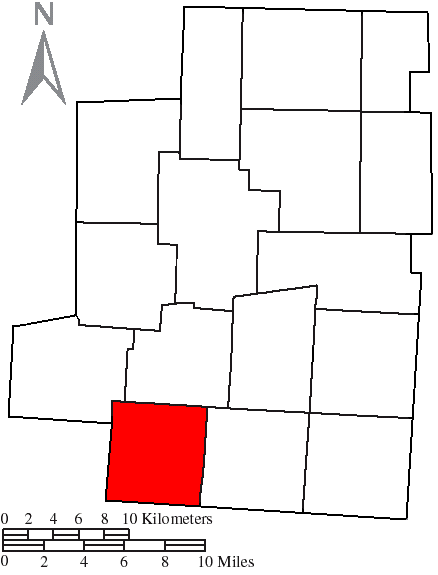
- Location of Peru Township in Morrow County
- Coordinates: 40°23′24″N 82°53′7″W
- Country: United States
- State: Ohio
- County: Morrow

Area
  - Total: 23.4 sq mi (60.6 km^{2})
  - Land: 23.4 sq mi (60.6 km^{2})
  - Water: 0 sq mi (0.0 km^{2})
- Elevation: 991 ft (302 m)

Population (2020)
  - Total: 1,496
  - Density: 63.9/sq mi (24.7/km^{2})
- Time zone: UTC-5 (Eastern (EST))
  - Summer (DST): UTC-4 (EDT)
- FIPS code: 39-62260
- GNIS feature ID: 1086708
- Website: https://perutownshipohio.org/

Peru Township is one of the sixteen townships of Morrow County, Ohio, United States. The 2020 census found 1,496 people in the township.

== Geography ==
Located in the southwestern part of the county, it borders the following townships:

- Lincoln Township - north
- Bennington Township - east
- Porter Township, Delaware County - southeast corner
- Kingston Township, Delaware County - south
- Brown Township, Delaware County - southwest corner
- Oxford Township, Delaware County - west
- Westfield Township - northwest

No municipalities are located in Peru Township.

== Name and history ==
Peru Township was organized in 1817. The township was named after Peru, New York, the native home of a share of the early settlers. Originally part of neighboring Delaware County, Peru Township became part of Morrow County in 1848. Statewide, the only other Peru Township is located in Huron County.

== Government ==
The township is governed by a three-member board of trustees, who are elected in November of odd-numbered years to a four-year term beginning on the following January 1. Two are elected in the year after the presidential election and one is elected in the year before it. There is also an elected township fiscal officer, who serves a four-year term beginning on April 1 of the year after the election, which is held in November of the year before the presidential election. Vacancies in the fiscal officership or on the board of trustees are filled by the remaining trustees.

== Notable people ==
- Richard Dillingham, anti-slavery activist
