= Kirkwood Township, Belmont County, Ohio =

Township in Ohio, US

- Township
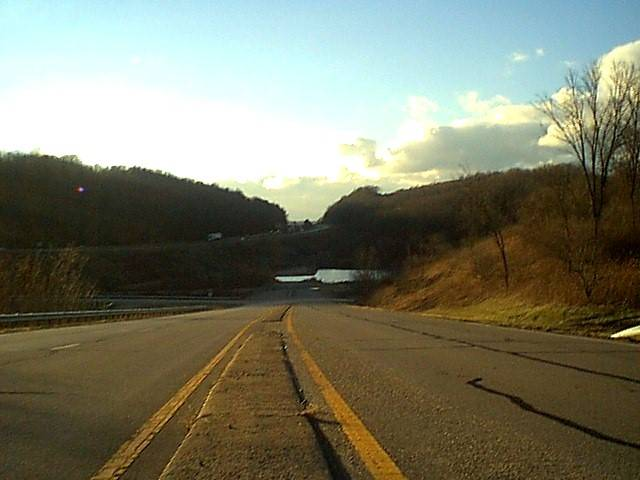
- U.S. Route 40 in the township's southeast

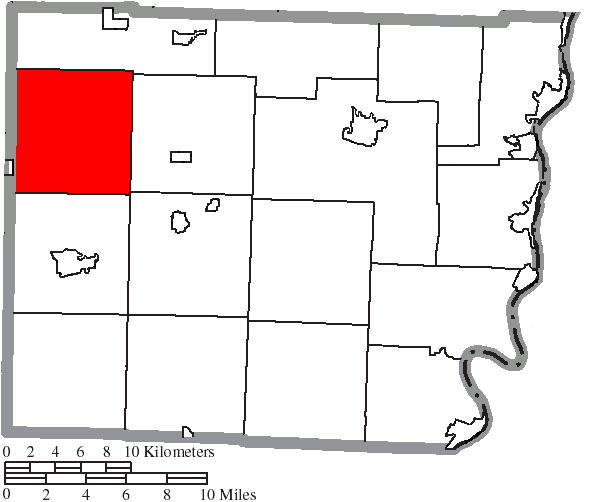
- Location of Kirkwood Township in Belmont County
- Coordinates: 40°4′35″N 81°10′10″W
- Country: United States
- State: Ohio
- County: Belmont

Area
  - Total: 36.7 sq mi (95.0 km^{2})
  - Land: 35.3 sq mi (91.5 km^{2})
  - Water: 1.4 sq mi (3.5 km^{2})
- Elevation: 965 ft (294 m)

Population (2020)
  - Total: 412
  - Density: 11.7/sq mi (4.50/km^{2})
- Time zone: UTC-5 (Eastern (EST))
  - Summer (DST): UTC-4 (EDT)
- FIPS code: 39-40600
- GNIS feature ID: 1085779

Kirkwood Township is one of the sixteen townships of Belmont County, Ohio, United States. The 2020 census found 412 people in the township.

== Geography ==
Located in the western part of the county, it borders the following townships:

- Flushing Township - north
- Union Township - east
- Goshen Township - southeast
- Warren Township - south
- Oxford Township, Guernsey County - southwest
- Londonderry Township, Guernsey County - northwest

Part of the village of Fairview is located in southwestern Kirkwood Township.

The Egypt Valley Wildlife Area comprises a significant portion of the township.

== Name and history ==
Kirkwood Township was named for Robert Kirkwood, a soldier who fought in the American Revolutionary War. It is the only Kirkwood Township statewide.

== Government ==
The township is governed by a three-member board of trustees, who are elected in November of odd-numbered years to a four-year term beginning on the following January 1. Two are elected in the year after the presidential election and one is elected in the year before it. There is also an elected township fiscal officer, who serves a four-year term beginning on April 1 of the year after the election, which is held in November of the year before the presidential election. Vacancies in the fiscal officership or on the board of trustees are filled by the remaining trustees.
