= Kilbourne, Ohio =

- Census-designated place
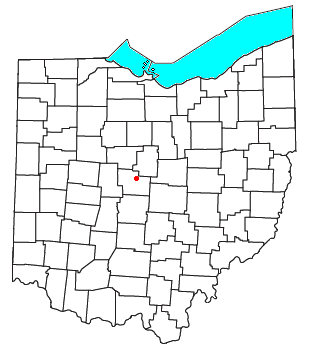
- Location of Kilbourne in Ohio
- Coordinates: 40°19′56″N 82°57′33″W
- Country: United States
- State: Ohio
- County: Delaware
- Township: Brown

Area
  - Total: 0.45 sq mi (1.16 km^{2})
  - Land: 0.45 sq mi (1.16 km^{2})
  - Water: 0 sq mi (0.00 km^{2})
- Elevation: 919 ft (280 m)

Population (2020)
  - Total: 127
  - Density: 282.7/sq mi (109.17/km^{2})
- Time zone: UTC-5 (Eastern (EST))
  - Summer (DST): UTC-4 (EDT)
- ZIP code: 43032
- Area codes: 740, 220
- FIPS code: 39-40124
- GNIS feature ID: 2628909

Kilbourne is a census-designated place in eastern Brown Township, Delaware County, Ohio, United States. As of the 2020 census it had a population of 127. The community has a post office with the ZIP code of 43032. It lies along State Route 521.

== History ==
Kilbourne was originally called Eden. A post office called Kilbourne was in operation since 1837 but was closed in 2017. The community has the name of James Kilbourne, surveyor.

== Demographics ==
Historical population
Census	Pop.	Note	%±
2020	127		—
U.S. Decennial Census
