= Fairview, Ohio =

- Village
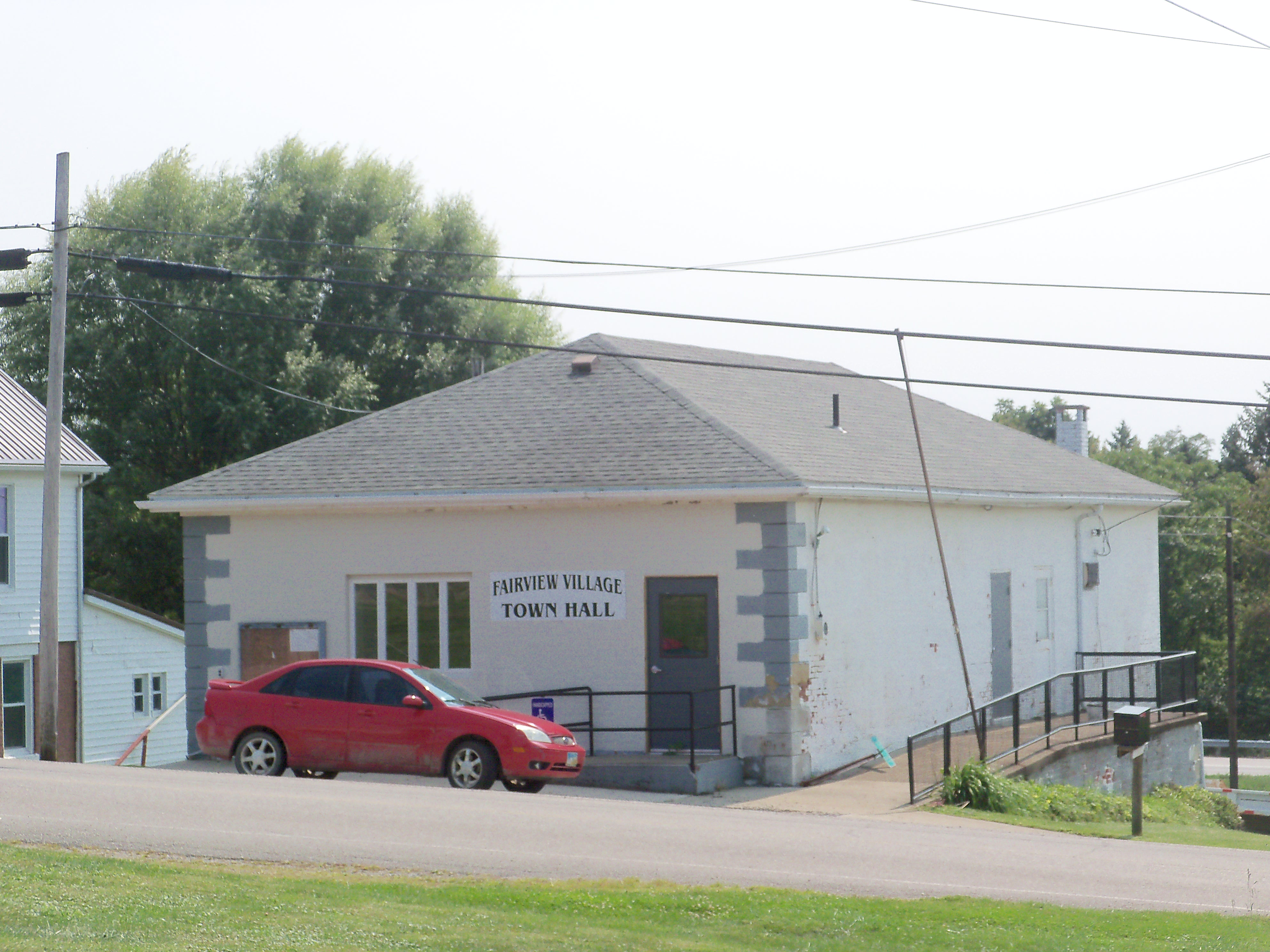
- Village hall

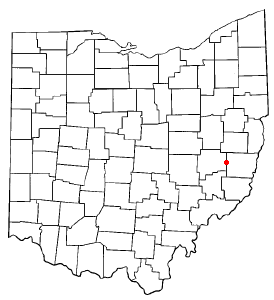
- Location of Fairview, Ohio

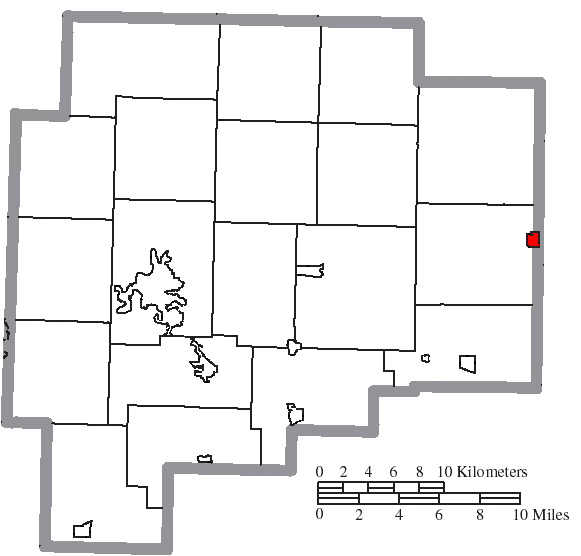
- Location of Fairview in Guernsey County
- Coordinates: 40°03′26″N 81°14′06″W
- Country: United States
- State: Ohio
- Counties: Guernsey, Belmont
- Townships: Oxford, Kirkwood

Area
  - Total: 0.40 sq mi (1.04 km^{2})
  - Land: 0.40 sq mi (1.04 km^{2})
  - Water: 0 sq mi (0.00 km^{2})
- Elevation: 1,194 ft (364 m)

Population (2020)
  - Total: 67
  - Estimate (2023): 69
  - Density: 166.9/sq mi (64.45/km^{2})
- Time zone: UTC-5 (Eastern (EST))
  - Summer (DST): UTC-4 (EDT)
- ZIP code: 43736
- Area code: 740
- FIPS code: 39-26348
- GNIS feature ID: 2398858

Fairview is a village in Belmont and Guernsey counties in the U.S. state of Ohio. The population was 67 as of the 2020 census. It is part of the Wheeling metropolitan area.

== History ==
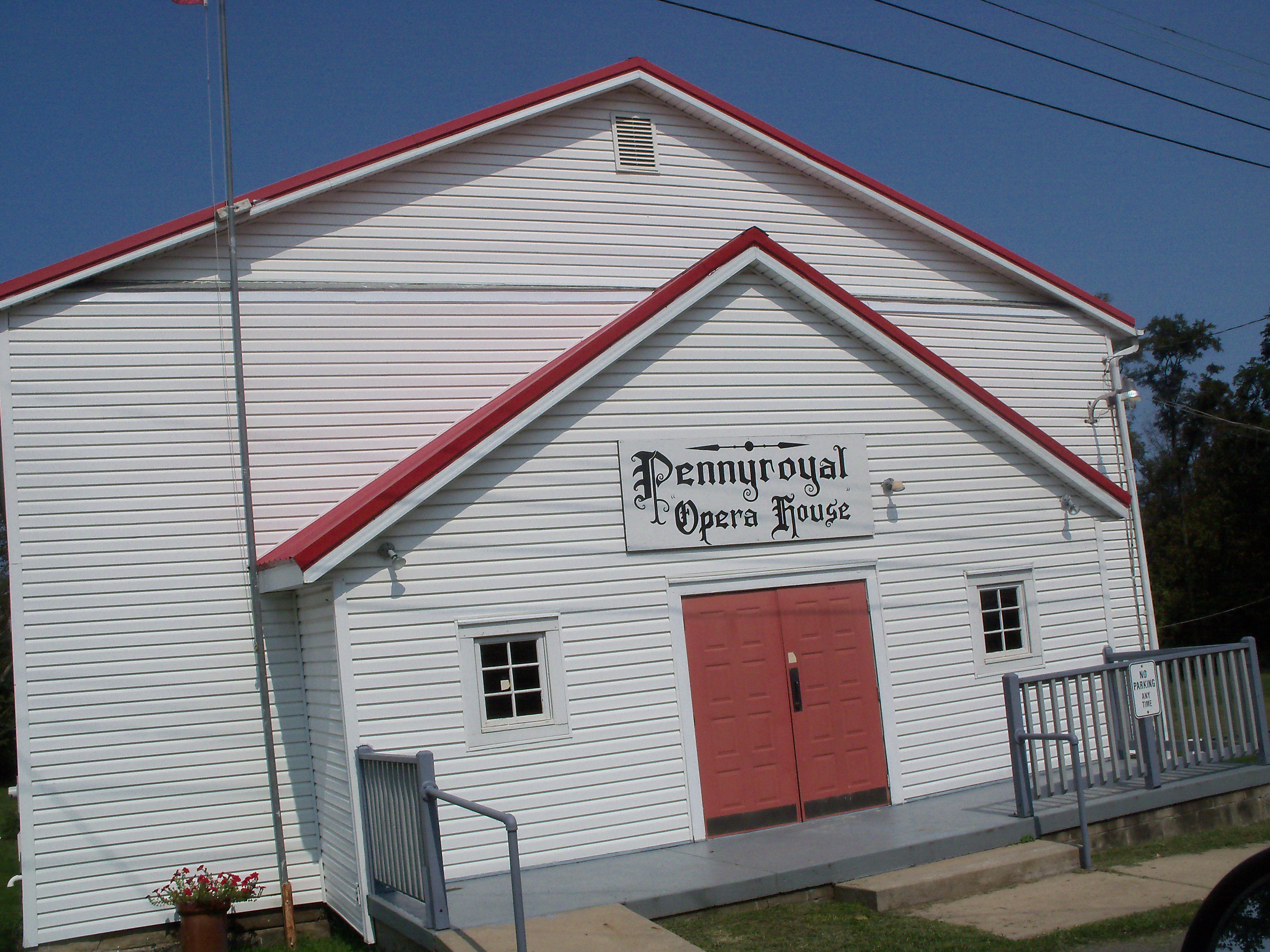
The Pennyroyal Opera House in Fairview

Fairview was platted in 1814. The name Fairview is commendatory. A post office called Fairview was established in 1823, and remained in operation until 1991.

== Geography ==
According to the United States Census Bureau, the village has a total area of 0.40 square miles (1.04 km^{2}), all land.

== Demographics ==
Historical population
Census	Pop.	Note	%±
1840	252		—
1850	444		76.2%
1860	365		−17.8%
1870	377		3.3%
1880	152		−59.7%
1890	322		111.8%
1900	291		−9.6%
1910	346		18.9%
1920	231		−33.2%
1930	217		−6.1%
1940	206		−5.1%
1950	192		−6.8%
1960	166		−13.5%
1970	110		−33.7%
1980	125		13.6%
1990	79		−36.8%
2000	81		2.5%
2010	83		2.5%
2020	67		−19.3%
2023 (est.)	69	▲	3.0%
U.S. Decennial Census

=== 2000 census ===
As of the 2000 census, there were 81 people, 26 households, and 21 families residing in the village. The population density was 190.8 inhabitants per square mile (73.7/km^{2}). There were 35 housing units at an average density of 82.4 per square mile (31.8/km^{2}). The racial makeup of the village was 100% White.

There were 26 households, out of which 30.8% had children under the age of 18 living with them, 69.2% were married couples living together, 15.4% had a female householder with no husband present, and 15.4% were non-families. 7.7% of all households were made up of individuals, and 3.8% had someone living alone who was 65 years of age or older. The average household size was 3.12 and the average family size was 3.41.

In the village, the population was spread out, with 28.4% under the age of 18, 7.4% from 18 to 24, 21.0% from 25 to 44, 30.9% from 45 to 64, and 12.3% who were 65 years of age or older. The median age was 40 years. For every 100 females there were 102.5 males. For every 100 females age 18 and over, there were 100.0 males.

The median income for a household in the village was $32,250, and the median income for a family was $33,750. Males had a median income of $31,250 versus $13,125 for females. The per capita income for the village was $10,561. Additionally, 8.3% of families, or 9.1% of the population, lived below the poverty line, including nobody under eighteen and 16.7% of those over 64.

=== 2010 census ===
As of the 2010 census,. There were 50 housing units at an average density of 125.0 per square mile (48.3/km^{2}). The racial makeup of the village was 97.6% White, 1.2% African American, and 1.2% from two or more races. Hispanics or Latinos of any race made up 1.2% of the population.

There were 32 households, of which 25.0% contained children under the age of 18. In total, 56.3% of the households were married couples living together, 12.5% had a female householder with no husband present, 3.1% had a male householder with no wife present, and 28.1% were non-families. Out of all households, 21.9% were made up of individuals, and 6.3% had someone living alone who was 65 years of age or older. The average household size was 2.59 and the average family size was 3.13.

The median age in the village was 43.3 years. 20.5% of residents were under the age of 18, 14.3% were between the ages of 18 and 24, 16.8% were from 25 to 44, 31.3% were from 45 to 64, and 16.9% were 65 years of age or older. The gender makeup of the village was 56.6% male and 43.4% female.

== Notable people ==
- Walter P. Lane, Confederate general
