= Sparta, Ohio =

- Village
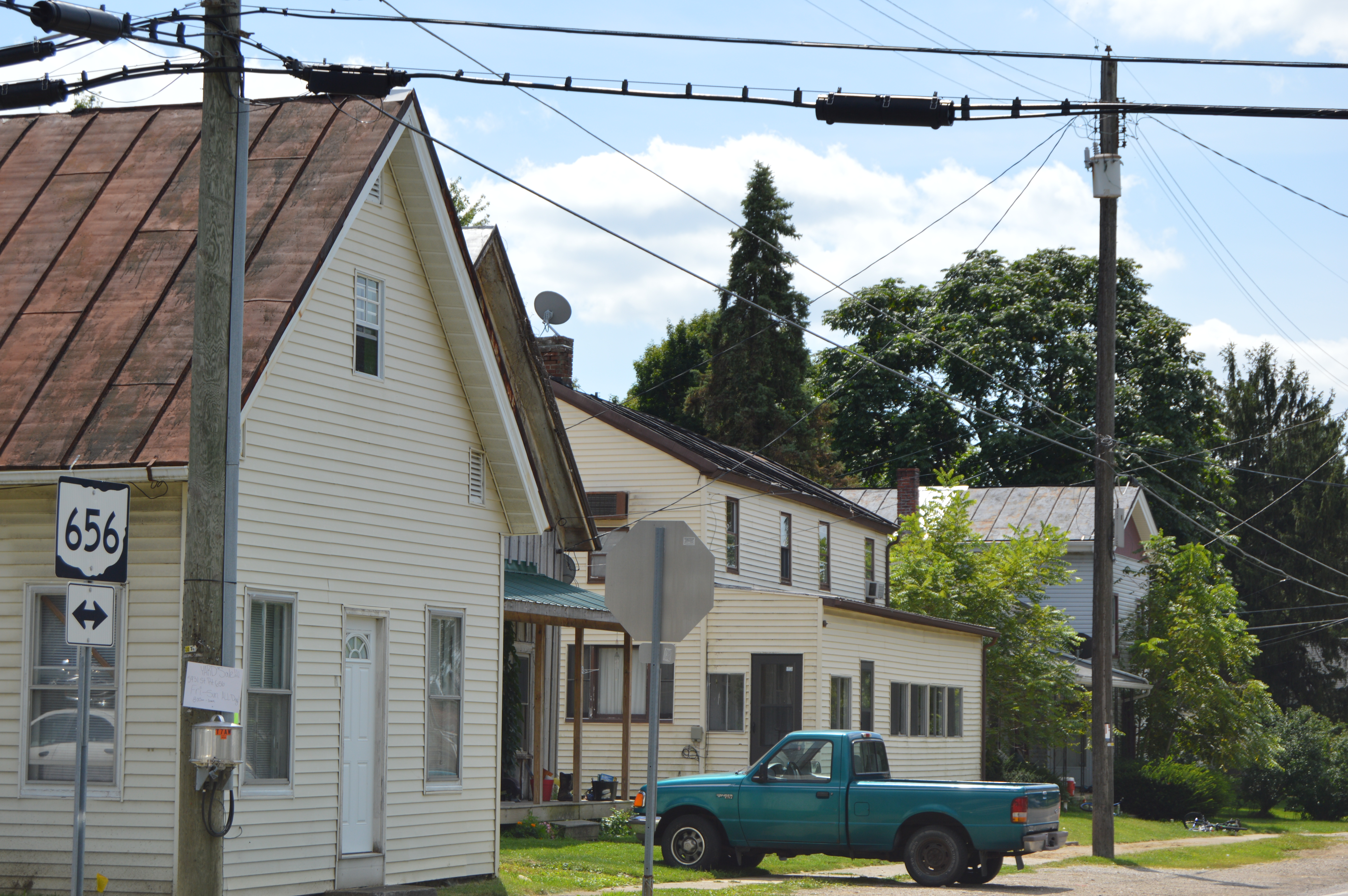
- Houses on Main Street

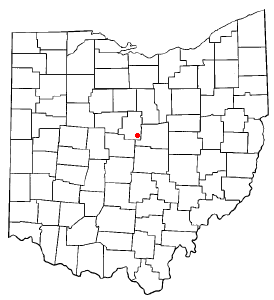
- Location of Sparta, Ohio

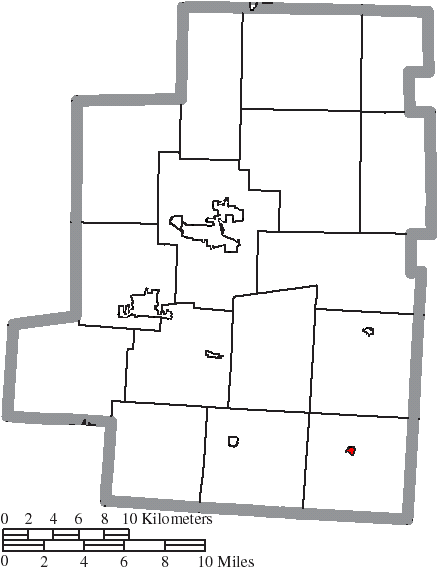
- Location of Sparta in Morrow County
- Coordinates: 40°23′40″N 82°41′59″W
- Country: United States
- State: Ohio
- County: Morrow
- Township: South Bloomfield

Area
  - Total: 0.085 sq mi (0.22 km^{2})
  - Land: 0.085 sq mi (0.22 km^{2})
  - Water: 0 sq mi (0.00 km^{2})
- Elevation: 1,358 ft (414 m)

Population (2020)
  - Total: 121
  - Density: 1,393.5/sq mi (538.03/km^{2})
- Time zone: UTC-5 (Eastern (EST))
  - Summer (DST): UTC-4 (EDT)
- ZIP code: 43350
- Area code: 419
- FIPS code: 39-73950
- GNIS feature ID: 2399867
- Website: https://spartavillageoh.com/

Sparta is a village in Morrow County, Ohio, United States. The population was 121 at the 2020 census. Sparta is southeast of Mount Gilead, the county seat.

== History ==
Sparta was laid out in 1837. A post office has been in operation at Sparta since 1837. The village was incorporated around 1870.

== Geography ==
Sparta is considered to be a part of "Central Ohio".

According to the United States Census Bureau, the village has a total area of 0.09 square miles (0.23 km^{2}), all of it land.

== Demographics ==
Historical population
Census	Pop.	Note	%±
1850	127		—
1870	197		—
1880	235		19.3%
1890	216		−8.1%
1900	215		−0.5%
1910	191		−11.2%
1920	164		−14.1%
1930	148		−9.8%
1940	184		24.3%
1950	223		21.2%
1960	228		2.2%
1970	213		−6.6%
1980	219		2.8%
1990	201		−8.2%
2000	191		−5.0%
2010	161		−15.7%
2020	121		−24.8%
U.S. Decennial Census

=== 2010 census ===
As of the census of 2010, there were 161 people, 65 households, and 46 families living in the village. The population density was 1,788.9 inhabitants per square mile (690.7/km^{2}). There were 76 housing units at an average density of 844.4 per square mile (326.0/km^{2}). The racial makeup of the village was 95.7% White, 1.9% African American, 0.6% from other races, and 1.9% from two or more races. Hispanic or Latino of any race were 0.6% of the population.

There were 65 households, of which 30.8% had children under the age of 18 living with them, 41.5% were married couples living together, 27.7% had a female householder with no husband present, 1.5% had a male householder with no wife present, and 29.2% were non-families. 26.2% of all households were made up of individuals, and 7.7% had someone living alone who was 65 years of age or older. The average household size was 2.48 and the average family size was 2.96.

The median age in the village was 40.6 years. 25.5% of residents were under the age of 18; 6.8% were between the ages of 18 and 24; 26% were from 25 to 44; 27.3% were from 45 to 64; and 14.3% were 65 years of age or older. The gender makeup of the village was 44.1% male and 55.9% female.

=== 2000 census ===
As of the census of 2000, there were 191 people, 70 households, and 56 families living in the village. The population density was 2,159.5 inhabitants per square mile (833.8/km^{2}). There were 75 housing units at an average density of 848.0 per square mile (327.4/km^{2}). The racial makeup of the village was 96.86% White, 1.57% African American, 0.52% from other races, and 1.05% from two or more races. Hispanic or Latino of any race were 0.52% of the population.

There were 70 households, out of which 38.6% had children under the age of 18 living with them, 54.3% were married couples living together, 22.9% had a female householder with no husband present, and 20.0% were non-families. 17.1% of all households were made up of individuals, and 7.1% had someone living alone who was 65 years of age or older. The average household size was 2.73 and the average family size was 3.04.

In the village, the population was spread out, with 25.1% under the age of 18, 9.4% from 18 to 24, 28.8% from 25 to 44, 20.9% from 45 to 64, and 15.7% who were 65 years of age or older. The median age was 36 years. For every 100 females there were 101.1 males. For every 100 females age 18 and over, there were 85.7 males.

The median income for a household in the village was $28,750, and the median income for a family was $31,458. Males had a median income of $31,500 versus $15,313 for females. The per capita income for the village was $11,793. About 18.8% of families and 16.4% of the population were below the poverty line, including 14.3% of those under the age of eighteen and 10.0% of those 65 or over.

== Notable people ==
- Tim Belcher, former Major League Baseball pitcher and one-time pitching coach for the Cleveland Indians
