= Berkshire Township, Ohio =

Township in Ohio, US

- Township
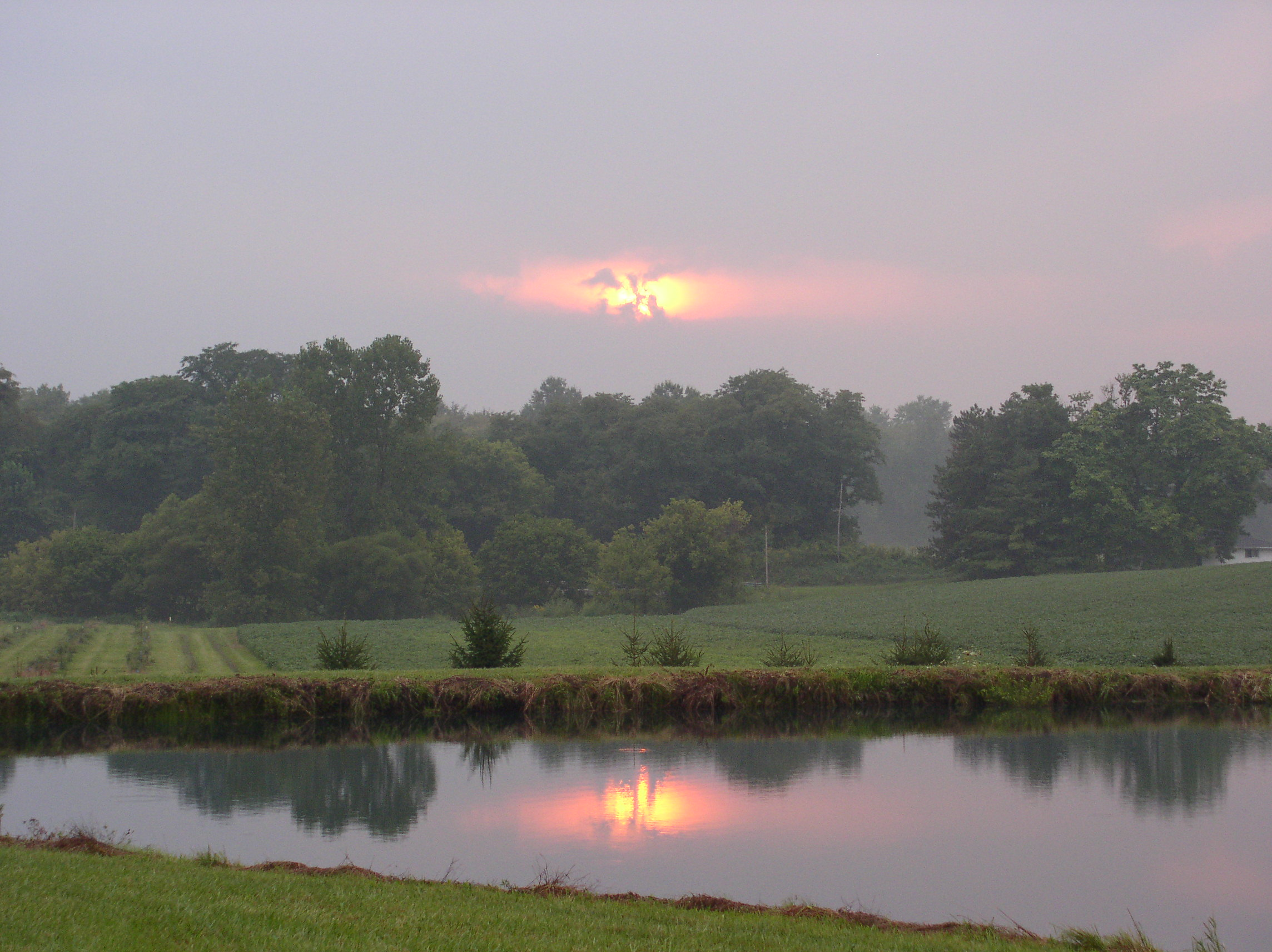
- Pond and fields in the township

- Location of Berkshire Township in Delaware County
- Coordinates: 40°13′56″N 82°53′26″W
- Country: United States
- State: Ohio
- County: Delaware

Area
  - Total: 21.4 sq mi (55.5 km^{2})
  - Land: 21.0 sq mi (54.4 km^{2})
  - Water: 0.42 sq mi (1.1 km^{2})
- Elevation: 928 ft (283 m)

Population (2020)
  - Total: 5,477
  - Density: 261/sq mi (101/km^{2})
- Time zone: UTC-5 (Eastern (EST))
  - Summer (DST): UTC-4 (EDT)
- FIPS code: 39-05774
- GNIS feature ID: 1086042
- Website: berkshiretwp.org

Berkshire Township is one of the eighteen townships of Delaware County, Ohio, United States. The population at the 2020 census was 5,477.

== Geography ==
Located in the eastern part of the county, it borders the following townships:

- Kingston Township - north
- Porter Township - northeast corner
- Trenton Township - east
- Harlem Township - southeast corner
- Genoa Township - south
- Orange Township - southwest corner
- Berlin Township - west
- Brown Township - northwest corner

Two villages are located in Berkshire Township: Galena in the south, and most of Sunbury in the east.

== History ==
It is the only Berkshire Township statewide.

Berkshire Township was settled by Colonel Moses Byxbe in 1806 and named for Byxbe's former home of Berkshire County, Massachusetts.

== Government ==
The township is governed by a three-member board of trustees, who are elected in November of odd-numbered years to a four-year term beginning on the following January 1. Two are elected in the year after the presidential election and one is elected in the year before it. There is also an elected township fiscal officer, who serves a four-year term beginning on April 1 of the year after the election, which is held in November of the year before the presidential election. Vacancies in the fiscal officership or on the board of trustees are filled by the remaining trustees.

== Public services ==
Emergency medical services in Berkshire Township are provided by the Delaware County EMS.
