= Troy Township, Delaware County, Ohio =

Township in Ohio, US

- Township
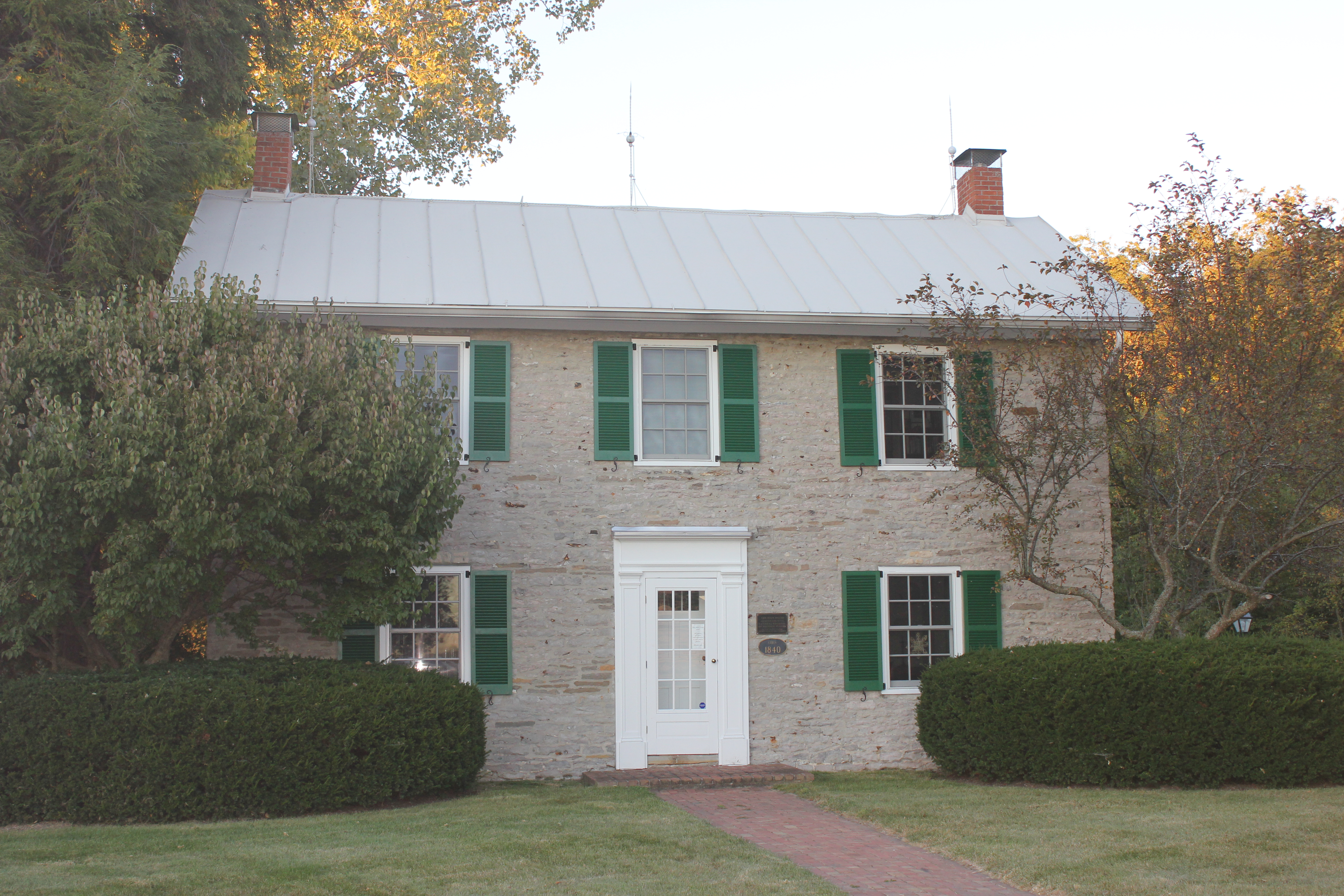
- High House just north of Delaware

- Location of Troy Township in Delaware County
- Coordinates: 40°21′24″N 83°4′15″W
- Country: United States
- State: Ohio
- County: Delaware

Area
  - Total: 24.5 sq mi (63.5 km^{2})
  - Land: 23.3 sq mi (60.4 km^{2})
  - Water: 1.2 sq mi (3.0 km^{2})
- Elevation: 925 ft (282 m)

Population (2020)
  - Total: 2,105
  - Density: 90.3/sq mi (34.9/km^{2})
- Time zone: UTC-5 (Eastern (EST))
  - Summer (DST): UTC-4 (EDT)
- FIPS code: 39-77560
- GNIS feature ID: 1086060
- Website: https://troytwpdelawareoh.gov/

Troy Township is one of the eighteen townships of Delaware County, Ohio, United States. As of the 2020 census the population was 2,105.

== Geography ==
Located in the northwestern part of the county, it borders the following townships:

- Marlboro Township – north
- Oxford Township – northeast
- Brown Township – southeast
- Delaware Township – south
- Radnor Township – west

Part of the city of Delaware, the county seat of Delaware County, is located in southern Troy Township.

== Name and history ==
Troy Township was organized in 1816.

It is one of seven Troy Townships statewide.

== Government ==
The township is governed by a three-member board of trustees, who are elected in November of odd-numbered years to a four-year term beginning on the following January 1. Two are elected in the year after the presidential election, and one is elected in the year before it. There is also an elected township fiscal officer, who serves a four-year term beginning on April 1 of the year after the election, which is held in November of the year before the presidential election. Vacancies of the fiscal officers or on the board of trustees are filled by the remaining trustees.

== Public services ==
Emergency medical services in Concord Township are provided by the Delaware County EMS.
