= Cardington Township, Ohio =

Township in Ohio, US

Cardington Township, Morrow County, Ohio
- Township
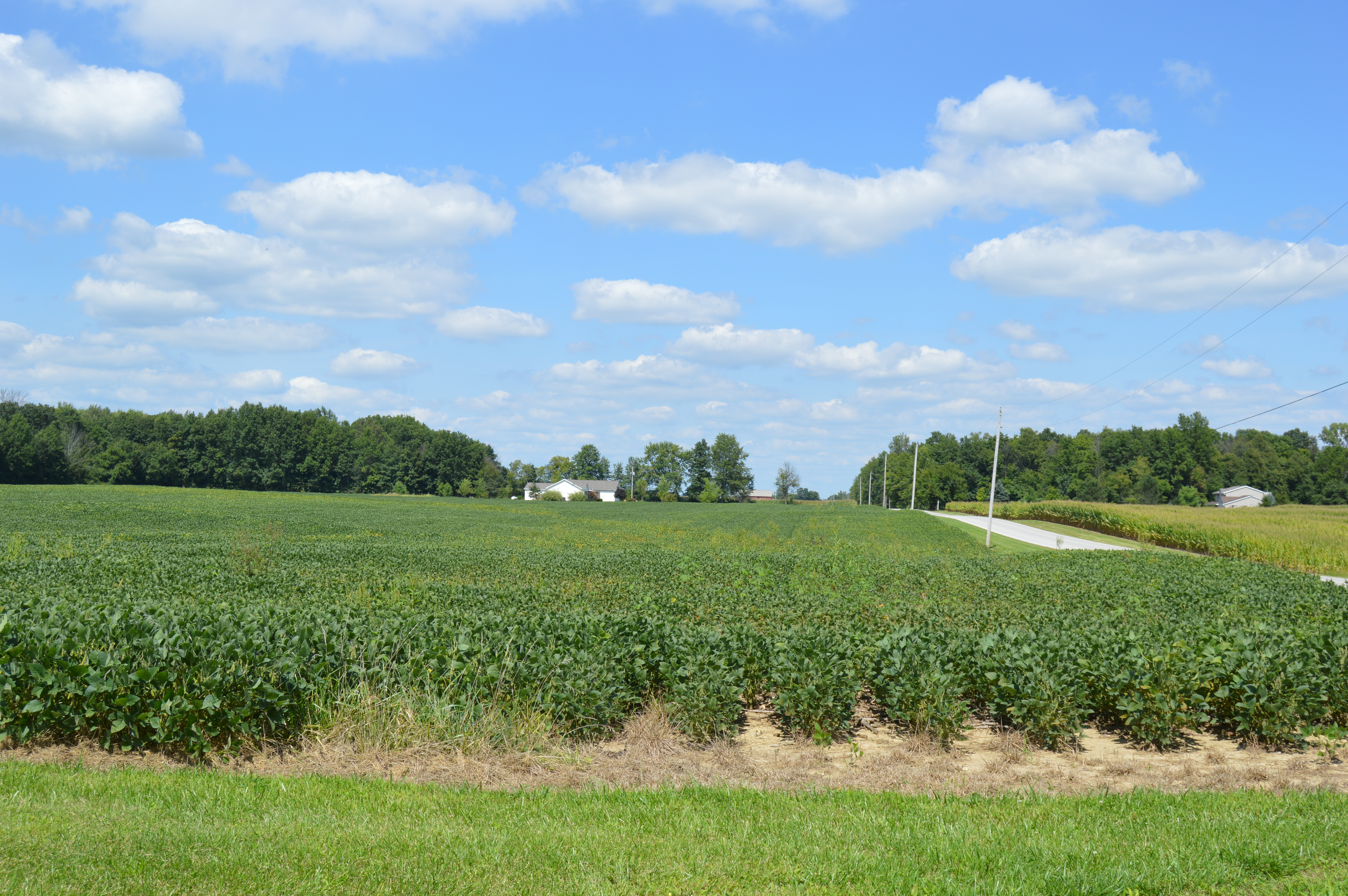
- Fields west of Cardington

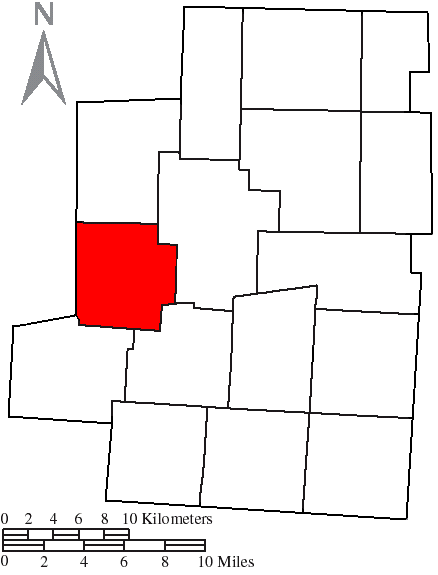
- Location of Cardington Township in Morrow County
- Coordinates: 40°30′16″N 82°54′3″W
- Country: United States
- State: Ohio
- County: Morrow

Area
  - Total: 23.8 sq mi (61.7 km^{2})
  - Land: 23.8 sq mi (61.7 km^{2})
  - Water: 0 sq mi (0.0 km^{2})
- Elevation: 997 ft (304 m)

Population (2020)
  - Total: 3,031
  - Density: 127/sq mi (49.1/km^{2})
- Time zone: UTC-5 (Eastern (EST))
  - Summer (DST): UTC-4 (EDT)
- ZIP code: 43315
- Area code: 419
- FIPS code: 39-12098
- GNIS feature ID: 1086699
- Website: https://cardingtontownship.org/

Cardington Township is one of the sixteen townships of Morrow County, Ohio, United States. The 2020 census found 3,031 people in the township, 2,051 of whom lived in the village of Cardington.

== Geography ==
Located in the western part of the county, it borders the following townships:

- Canaan Township - north
- Gilead Township - northeast
- Lincoln Township - southeast
- Westfield Township - southwest
- Richland Township, Marion County - west
- Claridon Township, Marion County - northwest corner

Most of the village of Cardington is located in southeastern Cardington Township.

== Name and history ==
Cardington Township took its name from the village of Cardington. It is the only Cardington Township statewide.

== Government ==
The township is governed by a three-member board of trustees, who are elected in November of odd-numbered years to a four-year term beginning on the following January 1. Two are elected in the year after the presidential election and one is elected in the year before it. There is also an elected township fiscal officer, who serves a four-year term beginning on April 1 of the year after the election, which is held in November of the year before the presidential election. Vacancies in the fiscal officership or on the board of trustees are filled by the remaining trustees.
