= Berlin Township, Delaware County, Ohio =

Township in Ohio, US

- Township
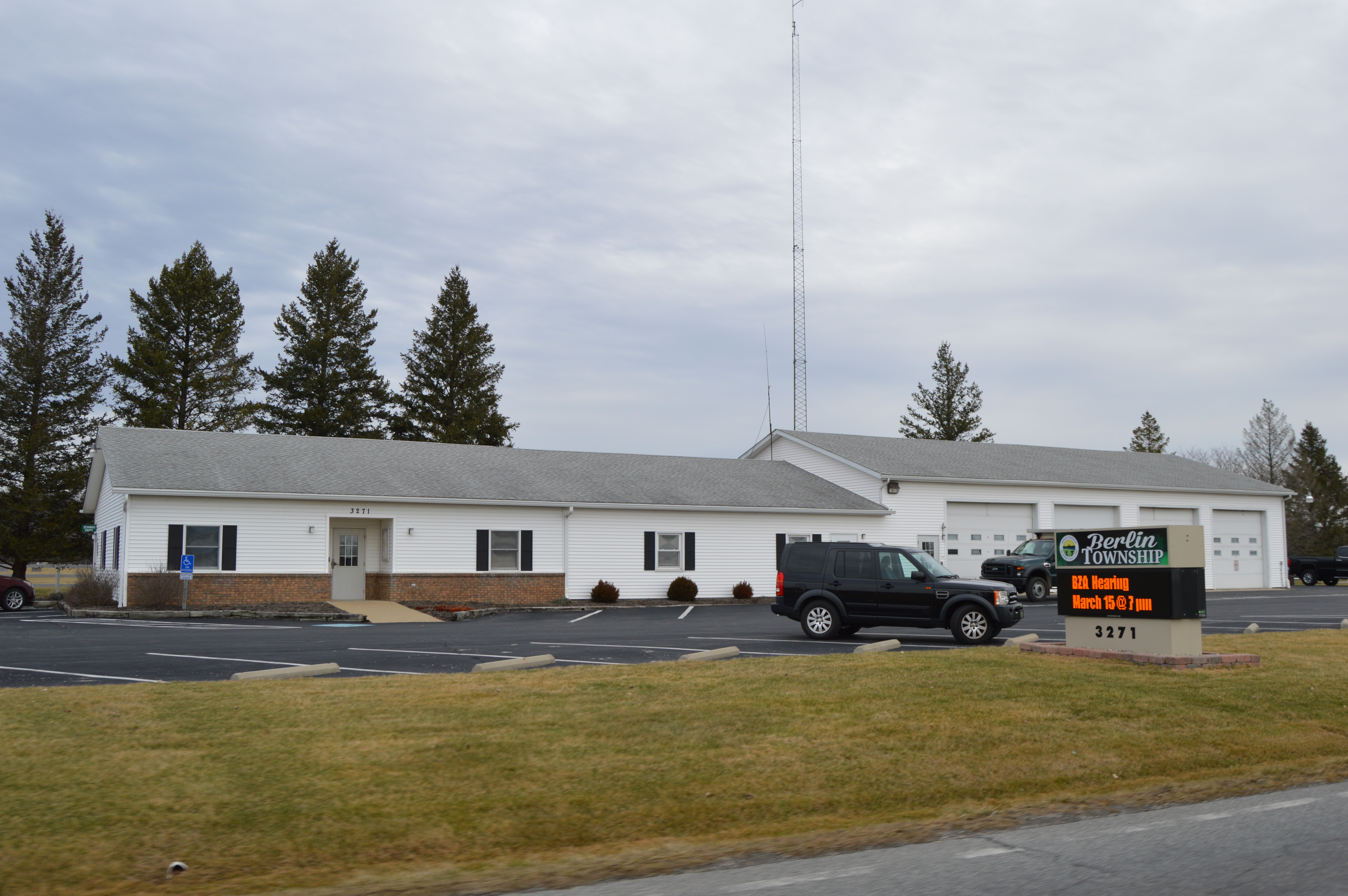
- Township hall

- Location of Berlin Township in Delaware County
- Coordinates: 40°14′7″N 82°59′2″W
- Country: United States
- State: Ohio
- County: Delaware

Area
  - Total: 25.4 sq mi (65.8 km^{2})
  - Land: 22.4 sq mi (57.9 km^{2})
  - Water: 3.1 sq mi (7.9 km^{2})
- Elevation: 945 ft (288 m)

Population (2020)
  - Total: 9,344
  - Density: 418/sq mi (161/km^{2})
- Time zone: UTC-5 (Eastern (EST))
  - Summer (DST): UTC-4 (EDT)
- FIPS code: 39-05788
- GNIS feature ID: 1086043
- Website: www.berlintwp.us

Berlin Township is one of the eighteen townships of Delaware County, Ohio, United States. The population at the 2020 census was 9,344.

== Geography ==
Located in the center of the county, it borders the following townships:

- Brown Township - north
- Kingston Township - northeast corner
- Berkshire Township - east
- Genoa Township - southeast corner
- Orange Township - south
- Liberty Township - southwest
- Delaware Township - northwest

A small part of the city of Delaware, the county seat of Delaware County, is located in northwestern Berlin Township.

== Name and history ==
Statewide, other Berlin Townships are located in Erie, Holmes, Knox, and Mahoning counties.

== Demographics ==
=== 2020 census ===
Powell racial composition
Race	Number	Percentage
White (NH)	7,068	76.0%
Black or African American (NH)	349	3.74%
Native American (NH)	17	0.18%
Asian (NH)	846	9.05%
Pacific Islander (NH)	3	0.03%
Other/mixed	704	7.53%
Hispanic or Latino	327	3.50%

== Government ==
The township is governed by a three-member board of trustees, who are elected in November of odd-numbered years to a four-year term beginning on the following January 1. Two are elected in the year after the presidential election and one is elected in the year before it. There is also an elected township fiscal officer, who serves a four-year term beginning on April 1 of the year after the election, which is held in November of the year before the presidential election. Vacancies in the fiscal officership or on the board of trustees are filled by the remaining trustees.

== Public services ==
Emergency medical services in Berlin Township are provided by the Delaware County EMS.
