= Kingston Center, Ohio =

Unincorporated community in Ohio, U.S.

Coordinates: 40°19′30″N 82°52′49″W

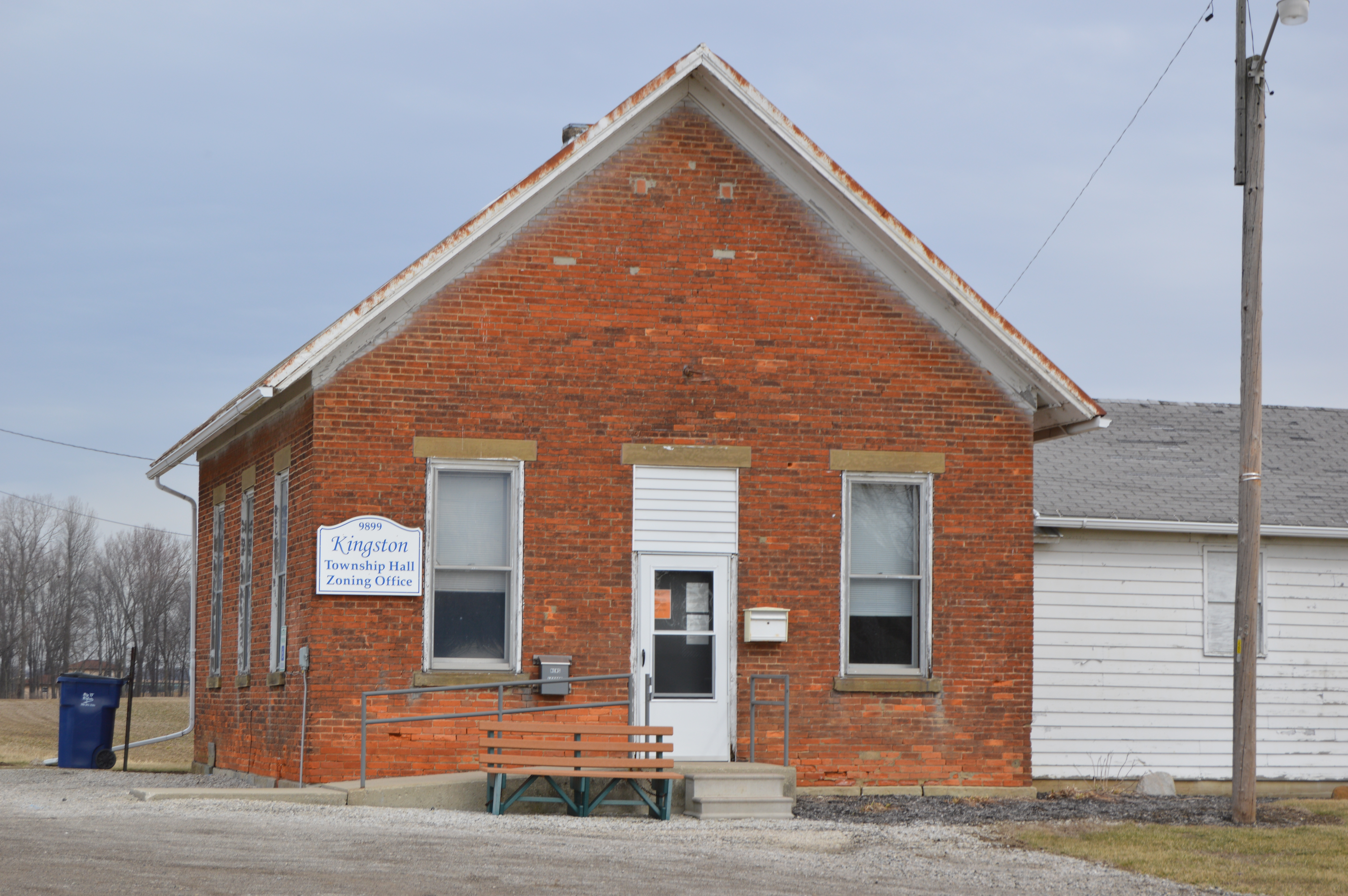
Kingston Township hall

Kingston Center is an unincorporated community in Delaware County, in the U.S. state of Ohio.

== History ==
A post office called Kingston Centre was established in 1851, the name was changed to Kingston Center in 1892 and the post office closed in 1901.
