= Brown Township, Delaware County, Ohio =

Township in Ohio, US

- Township
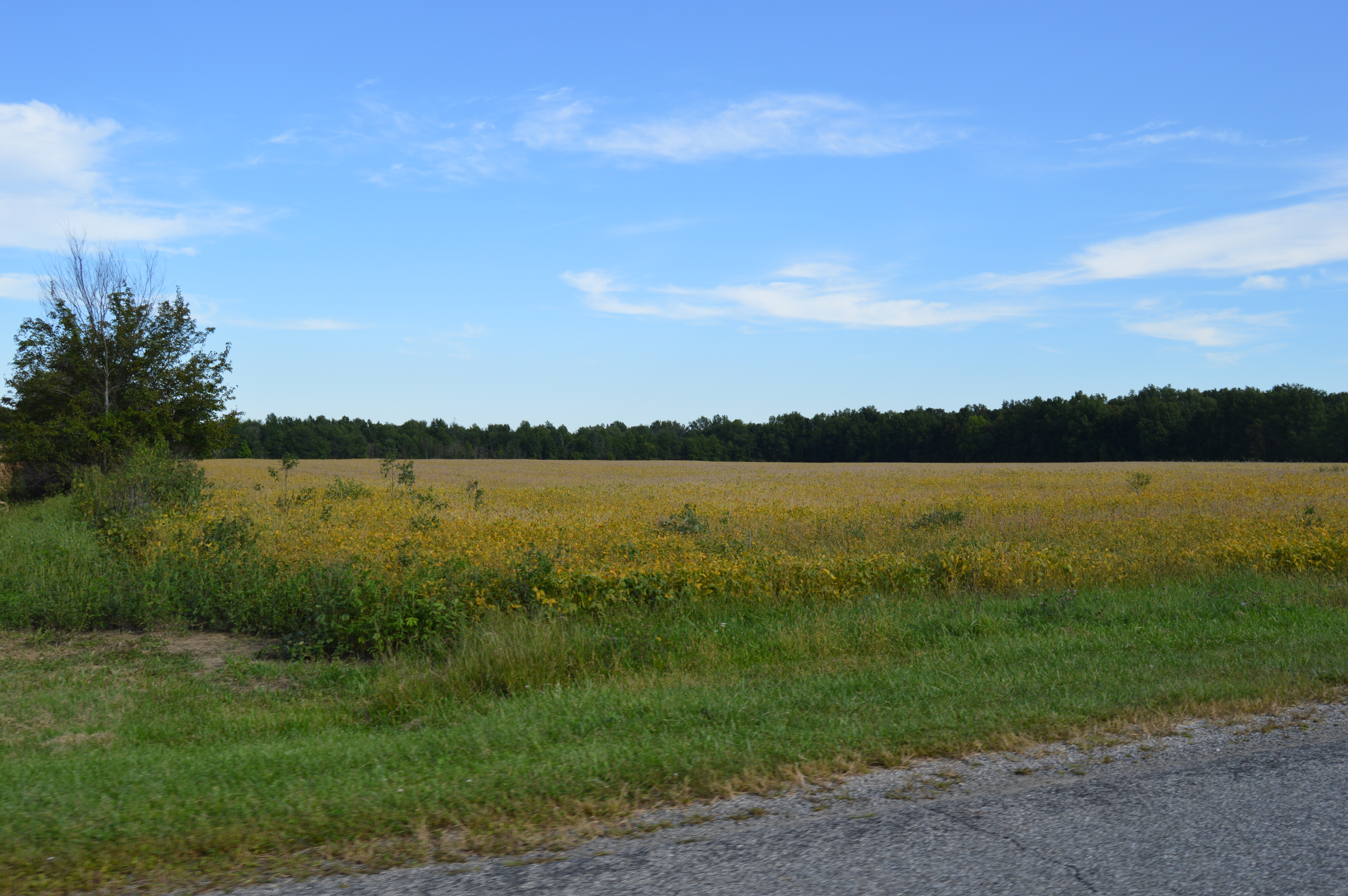
- Fields along Veley Road

- Location of Brown Township in Delaware County
- Coordinates: 40°19′41″N 82°59′20″W
- Country: United States
- State: Ohio
- County: Delaware

Area
  - Total: 25.7 sq mi (66.5 km^{2})
  - Land: 25.1 sq mi (65.1 km^{2})
  - Water: 0.54 sq mi (1.4 km^{2})
- Elevation: 942 ft (287 m)

Population (2020)
  - Total: 1,402
  - Density: 55.8/sq mi (21.5/km^{2})
- Time zone: UTC-5 (Eastern (EST))
  - Summer (DST): UTC-4 (EDT)
- FIPS code: 39-09428
- GNIS feature ID: 1086044

Brown Township is one of the eighteen townships of Delaware County, Ohio, United States. As of the 2020 census the population was 1,402.

== Geography ==
Located in the northern part of the county, it borders the following townships:

- Oxford Township - north
- Peru Township, Morrow County - northeast corner
- Kingston Township - east
- Berkshire Township - southeast corner
- Berlin Township - south
- Delaware Township - southwest
- Troy Township - northwest

A small, uninhabited part of the city of Delaware, the county seat of Delaware County, is located in southwestern Brown Township, and the census-designated place of Kilbourne lies in the township's east.

== Name and history ==
Brown Township was created about 1826.

It is one of eight Brown Townships statewide.

== Government ==
The township is governed by a three-member board of trustees, who are elected in November of odd-numbered years to a four-year term beginning on the following January 1. Two are elected in the year after the presidential election and one is elected in the year before it. There is also an elected township fiscal officer, who serves a four-year term beginning on April 1 of the year after the election, which is held in November of the year before the presidential election. Vacancies in the fiscal officership or on the board of trustees are filled by the remaining trustees.

== Public services ==
Emergency medical services in Brown Township are provided by the Delaware County EMS.
