= Oxford Township, Guernsey County, Ohio =

Township in Ohio, US

- Township
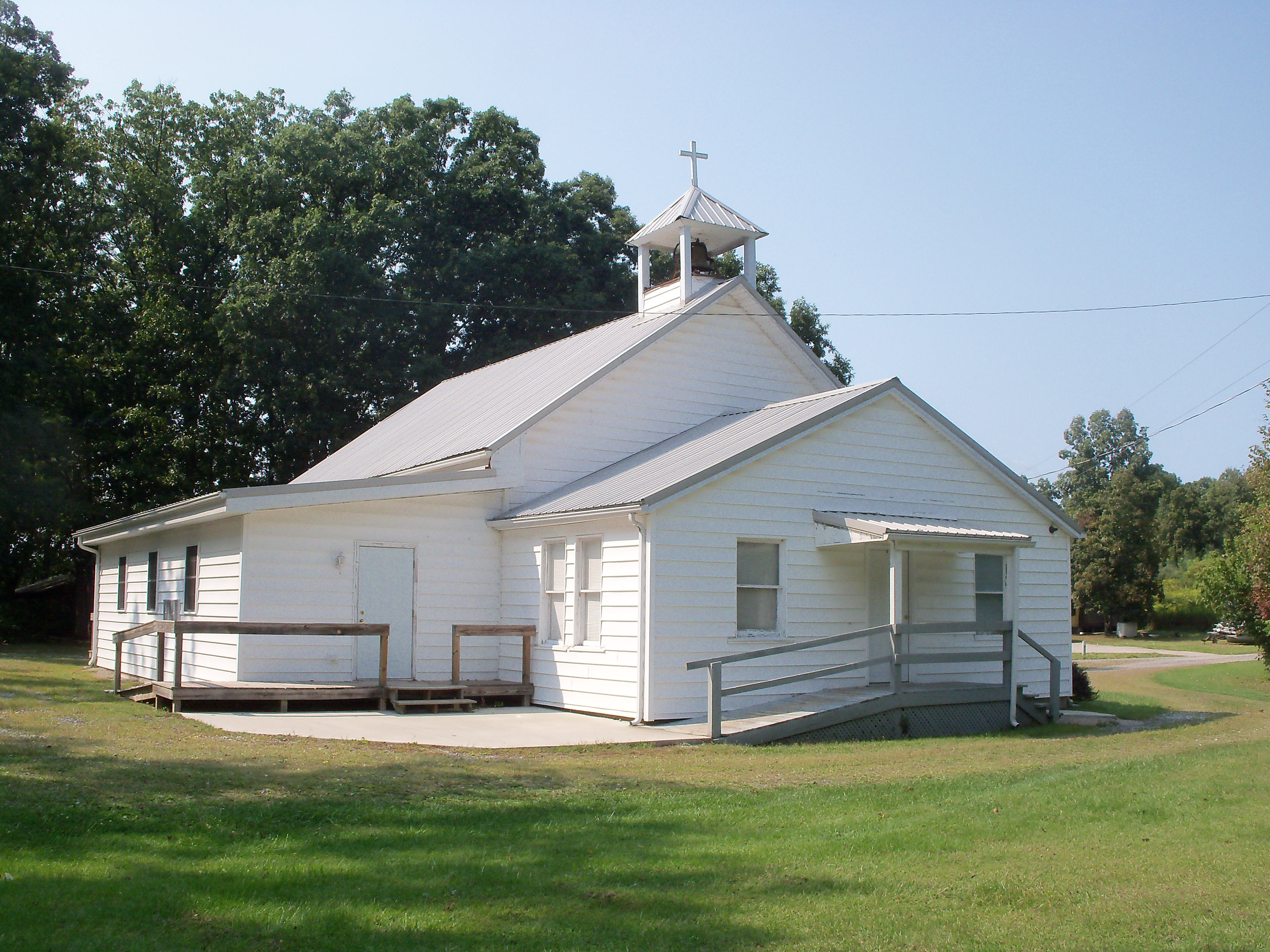
- Salt Fork Baptist Church in the northwest corner of the township

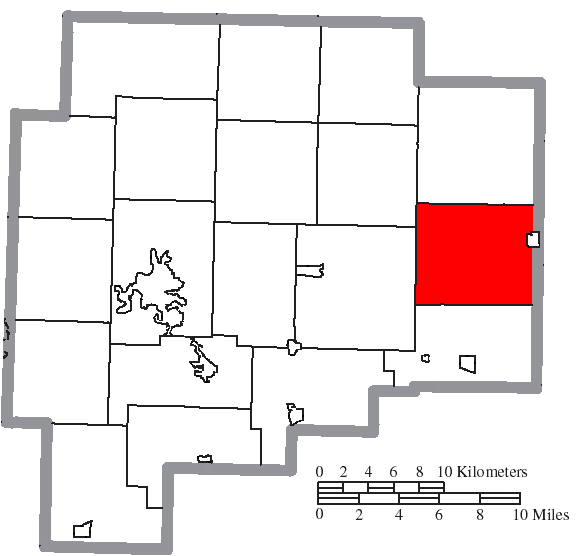
- Location of Oxford Township in Guernsey County
- Coordinates: 40°3′32″N 81°16′39″W
- Country: United States
- State: Ohio
- County: Guernsey

Area
  - Total: 30.2 sq mi (78.1 km^{2})
  - Land: 30.2 sq mi (78.1 km^{2})
  - Water: 0 sq mi (0.0 km^{2})
- Elevation: 1,050 ft (320 m)

Population (2020)
  - Total: 754
  - Density: 25.0/sq mi (9.65/km^{2})
- Time zone: UTC-5 (Eastern (EST))
  - Summer (DST): UTC-4 (EDT)
- FIPS code: 39-59290
- GNIS feature ID: 1086188

Oxford Township is one of the nineteen townships of Guernsey County, Ohio, United States. As of the 2020 census the population was 754.

== Geography ==
Located in the eastern part of the county, it borders the following townships:

- Londonderry Township - north
- Kirkwood Township, Belmont County - northeast
- Warren Township, Belmont County - southeast
- Millwood Township - south
- Wills Township - west
- Madison Township - northwest

The village of Fairview is located in eastern Oxford Township.

== Name and history ==
Oxford Township was organized in 1810. It is one of six Oxford Townships statewide.

== Government ==
The township is governed by a three-member board of trustees, who are elected in November of odd-numbered years to a four-year term beginning on the following January 1. Two are elected in the year after the presidential election and one is elected in the year before it. There is also an elected township fiscal officer, who serves a four-year term beginning on April 1 of the year after the election, which is held in November of the year before the presidential election. Vacancies in the fiscal officership or on the board of trustees are filled by the remaining trustees.
