= Fulton, Ohio =

- Village
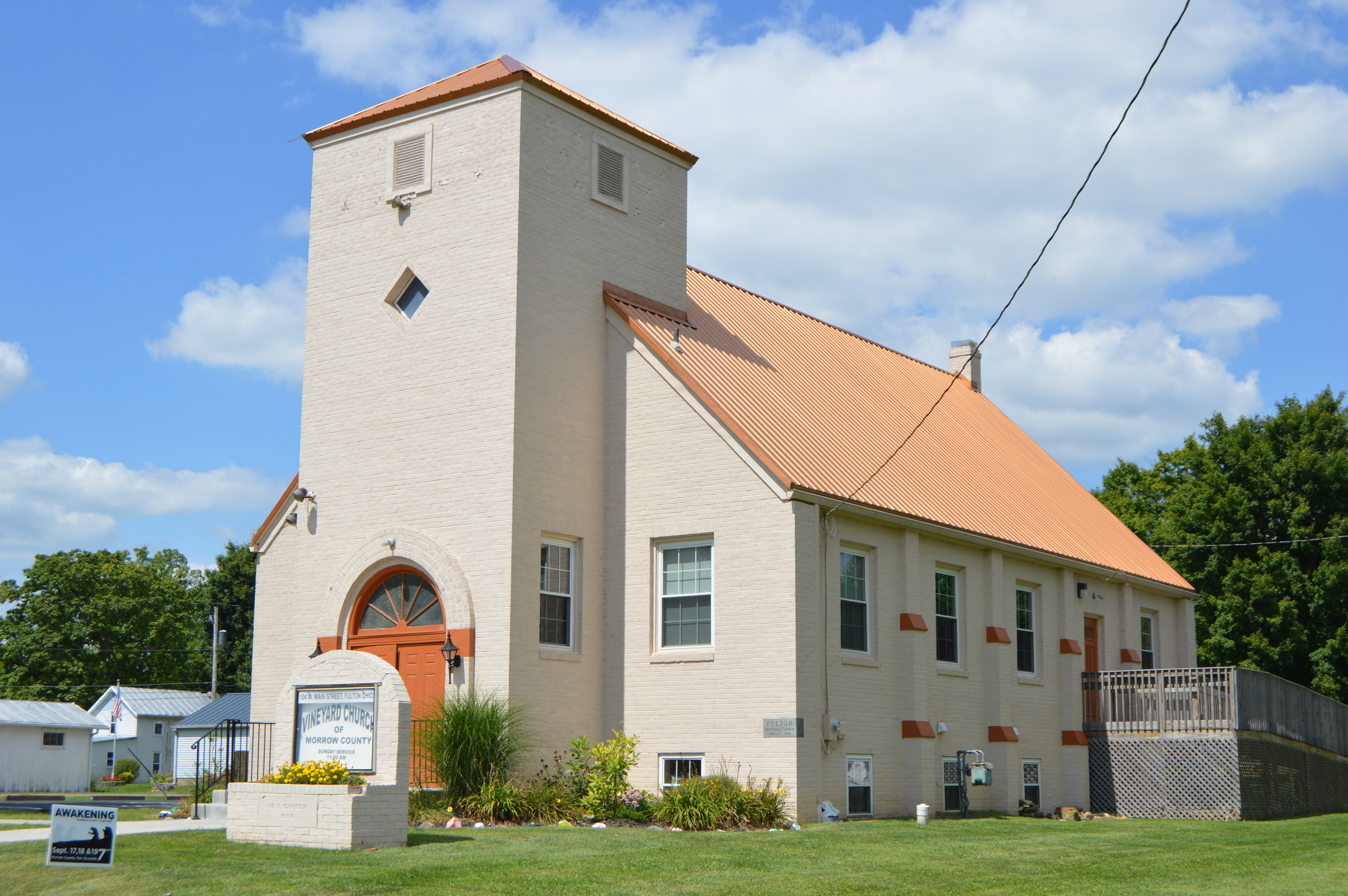
- Vineyard Church in Fulton

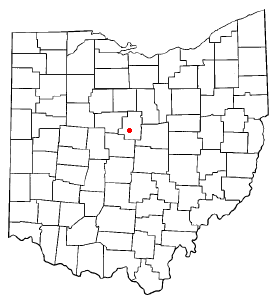
- Location of Fulton, Ohio

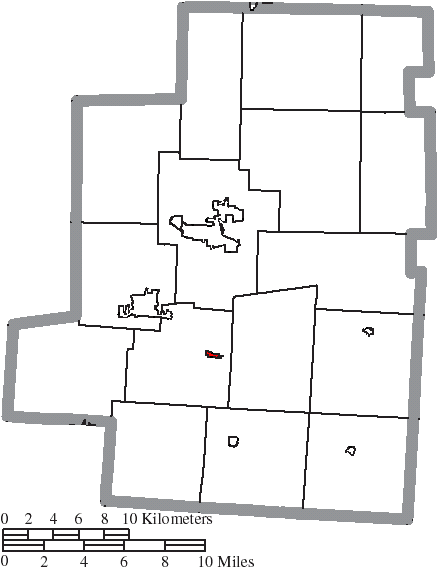
- Location of Fulton in Morrow County
- Coordinates: 40°27′47″N 82°49′42″W
- Country: United States
- State: Ohio
- County: Morrow

Area
  - Total: 0.16 sq mi (0.42 km^{2})
  - Land: 0.16 sq mi (0.42 km^{2})
  - Water: 0 sq mi (0.00 km^{2})
- Elevation: 1,109 ft (338 m)

Population (2020)
  - Total: 250
  - Estimate (2023): 249
  - Density: 1,527.9/sq mi (589.92/km^{2})
- Time zone: UTC-5 (Eastern (EST))
  - Summer (DST): UTC-4 (EDT)
- ZIP code: 43321
- Area code: 419
- FIPS code: 39-29050
- GNIS feature ID: 2398930

Fulton is a village in Morrow County, Ohio, United States. The population was 250 at the 2020 census. Fulton is south of Mount Gilead, the county seat.

== History ==
Fulton had its start when the railroad was extended to stone quarries near the original town site. A post office called Fulton has been in operation since 1881.

== Geography ==
Fulton is considered to be a part of Central Ohio.

According to the United States Census Bureau, the village has a total area of 0.15 square miles (0.39 km^{2}), all of it land.

== Demographics ==
Historical population
Census	Pop.	Note	%±
1950	269		—
1960	292		8.6%
1970	377		29.1%
1980	378		0.3%
1990	325		−14.0%
2000	264		−18.8%
2010	258		−2.3%
2020	250		−3.1%
2023 (est.)	249	▼	−0.4%
U.S. Decennial Census

=== 2010 census ===
As of the census of 2010, there were 258 people, 105 households, and 65 families living in the village. The population density was 1,720.0 inhabitants per square mile (664.1/km^{2}). There were 113 housing units at an average density of 753.3 per square mile (290.9/km^{2}). The racial makeup of the village was 96.9% White, 1.2% from other races, and 1.9% from two or more races. Hispanic or Latino of any race were 1.9% of the population.

There were 105 households, of which 34.3% had children under the age of 18 living with them, 37.1% were married couples living together, 14.3% had a female householder with no husband present, 10.5% had a male householder with no wife present, and 38.1% were non-families. 31.4% of all households were made up of individuals, and 12.4% had someone living alone who was 65 years of age or older. The average household size was 2.46 and the average family size was 3.02.

The median age in the village was 35.7 years. 27.5% of residents were under the age of 18; 5.1% were between the ages of 18 and 24; 31.4% were from 25 to 44; 22.5% were from 45 to 64; and 13.6% were 65 years of age or older. The gender makeup of the village was 46.9% male and 53.1% female.

=== 2000 census ===
As of the census of 2000, there were 264 people, 94 households, and 65 families living in the village. The population density was 1,756.2 inhabitants per square mile (678.1/km^{2}). There were 100 housing units at an average density of 665.2 per square mile (256.8/km^{2}). The racial makeup of the village was 99.24% White, 0.38% Native American, and 0.38% from two or more races. Hispanic or Latino of any race were 1.14% of the population.

There were 94 households, out of which 28.7% had children under the age of 18 living with them, 56.4% were married couples living together, 11.7% had a female householder with no husband present, and 29.8% were non-families. 27.7% of all households were made up of individuals, and 12.8% had someone living alone who was 65 years of age or older. The average household size was 2.45 and the average family size was 2.94.

In the village, the population was spread out, with 19.7% under the age of 18, 7.2% from 18 to 24, 30.3% from 25 to 44, 28.4% from 45 to 64, and 14.4% who were 65 years of age or older. The median age was 40 years. For every 100 females there were 100.0 males. For every 100 females age 18 and over, there were 105.8 males.

The median income for a household in the village was $30,500, and the median income for a family was $40,000. Males had a median income of $30,313 versus $20,714 for females. The per capita income for the village was $14,803. About 5.4% of families and 11.3% of the population were below the poverty line, including 14.0% of those under the age of eighteen and 4.1% of those 65 or over.
