= Westfield Township, Morrow County, Ohio =

Township in Ohio, US

- Township
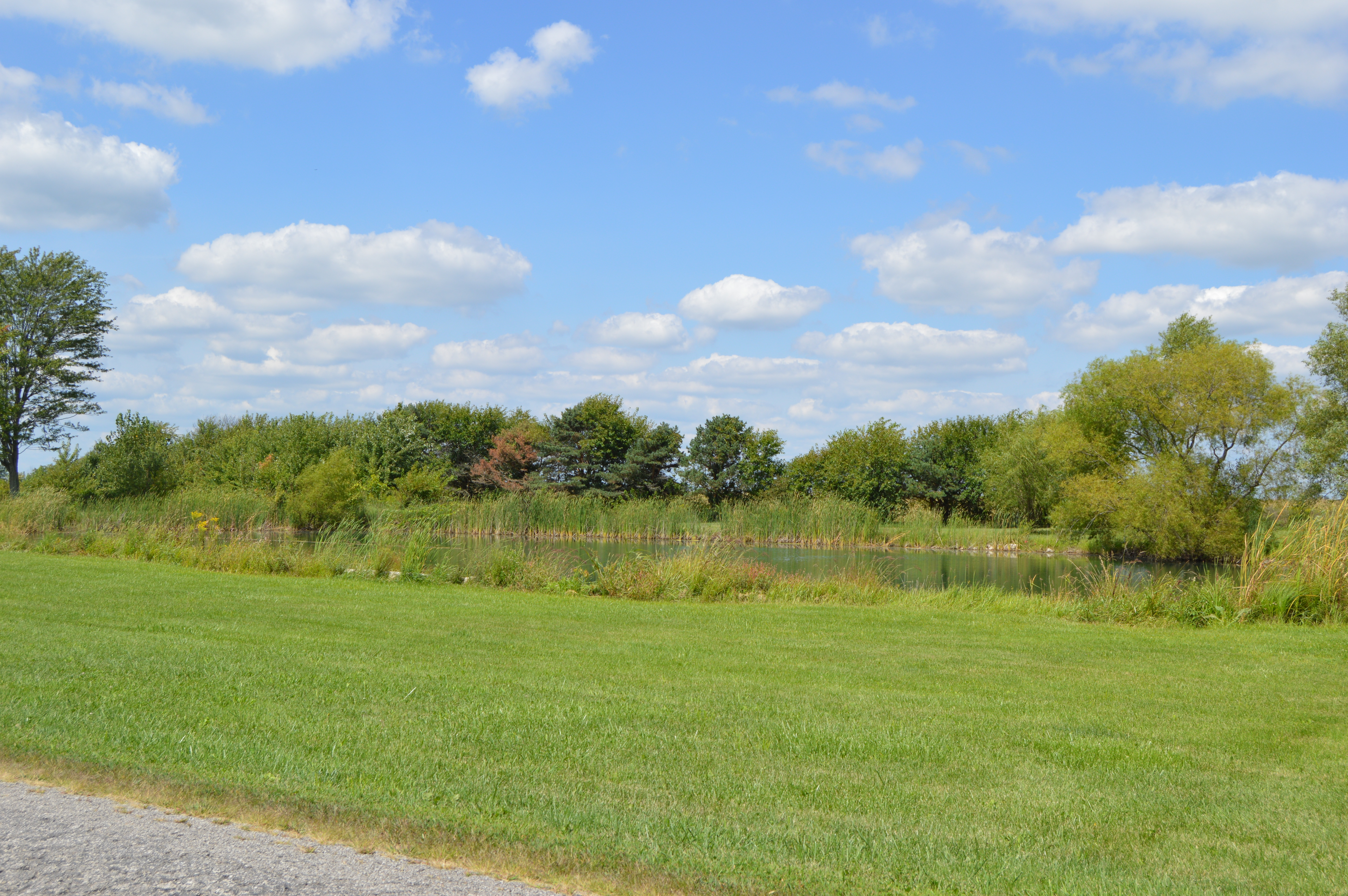
- Pond near the township's western border

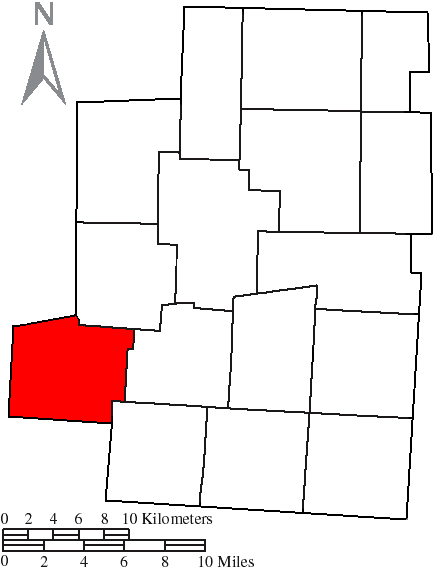
- Location of Westfield Township in Morrow County
- Coordinates: 40°27′11″N 82°57′14″W
- Country: United States
- State: Ohio
- County: Morrow

Area
  - Total: 27.1 sq mi (70.1 km^{2})
  - Land: 27.0 sq mi (70.0 km^{2})
  - Water: 0.039 sq mi (0.1 km^{2})
- Elevation: 978 ft (298 m)

Population (2020)
  - Total: 1,226
  - Density: 45.4/sq mi (17.5/km^{2})
- Time zone: UTC-5 (Eastern (EST))
  - Summer (DST): UTC-4 (EDT)
- FIPS code: 39-83454
- GNIS feature ID: 1086712

Westfield Township is one of the sixteen townships of Morrow County, Ohio, United States. The 2020 census found 1,226 people in the township.

== Geography ==
Located in the southwestern corner of the county, it borders the following townships:

- Cardington Township - northeast
- Lincoln Township - east
- Peru Township - southeast
- Oxford Township, Delaware County - south
- Marlboro Township, Delaware County - southwest
- Waldo Township, Marion County - west
- Richland Township, Marion County - northwest

No municipalities are located in Westfield Township.

== Name and history ==
Westfield Township was organized in 1822. Statewide, the only other Westfield Township is located in Medina County.

== Government ==
The township is governed by a three-member board of trustees, who are elected in November of odd-numbered years to a four-year term beginning on the following January 1. Two are elected in the year after the presidential election and one is elected in the year before it. There is also an elected township fiscal officer, who serves a four-year term beginning on April 1 of the year after the election, which is held in November of the year before the presidential election. Vacancies in the fiscal officership or on the board of trustees are filled by the remaining trustees.
