= Oxford Township, Delaware County, Ohio =

Township in Ohio, US

- Township
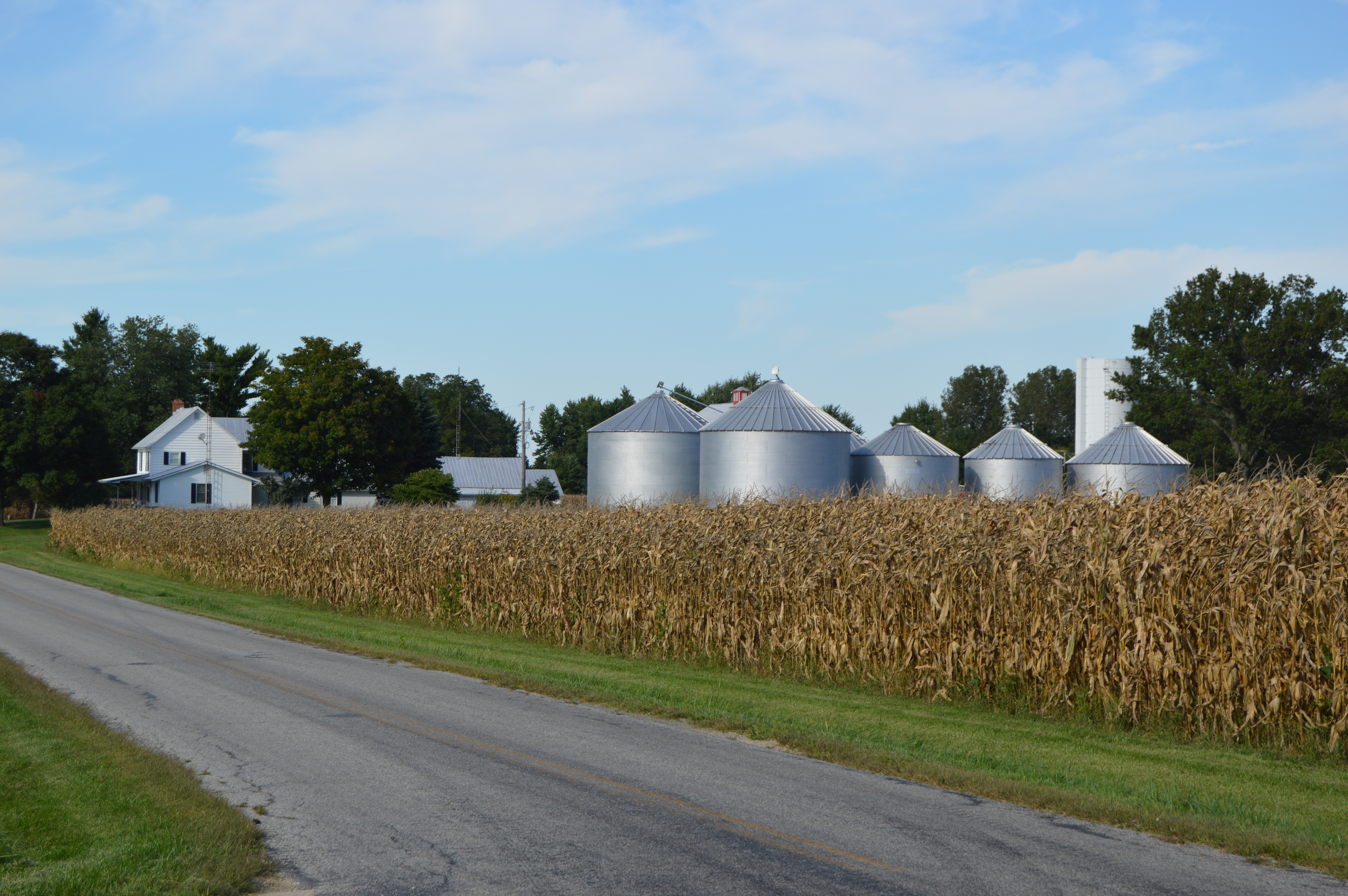
- Fields in the township's far southwest

- Location of Oxford Township in Delaware County
- Coordinates: 40°24′10″N 82°58′51″W
- Country: United States
- State: Ohio
- County: Delaware

Area
  - Total: 19.41 sq mi (50.28 km^{2})
  - Land: 19.41 sq mi (50.27 km^{2})
  - Water: 0.0039 sq mi (0.01 km^{2})
- Elevation: 968 ft (295 m)

Population (2020)
  - Total: 950
  - Density: 49/sq mi (19/km^{2})
- Time zone: UTC-5 (Eastern (EST))
  - Summer (DST): UTC-4 (EDT)
- FIPS code: 39-59262
- GNIS feature ID: 1086053

Oxford Township is one of the eighteen townships of Delaware County, Ohio, United States. As of the 2020 census the population was 950.

== Geography ==
Located in the northern part of the county, it borders the following townships:

- Westfield Township, Morrow County - north
- Peru Township, Morrow County - east
- Kingston Township - southeast corner
- Brown Township - south
- Troy Township - southwest
- Marlboro Township - northwest

The village of Ashley occupies part of northeastern Oxford Township.

== Name and history ==
Oxford Township was founded in 1815.

It is one of six Oxford Townships statewide.

== Government ==
The township is governed by a three-member board of trustees, who are elected in November of odd-numbered years to a four-year term beginning on the following January 1. Two are elected in the year after the presidential election and one is elected in the year before it. There is also an elected township fiscal officer, who serves a four-year term beginning on April 1 of the year after the election, which is held in November of the year before the presidential election. Vacancies in the fiscal officership or on the board of trustees are filled by the remaining trustees.
