= Marlboro Township, Delaware County, Ohio =

Township in Ohio, US

- Township
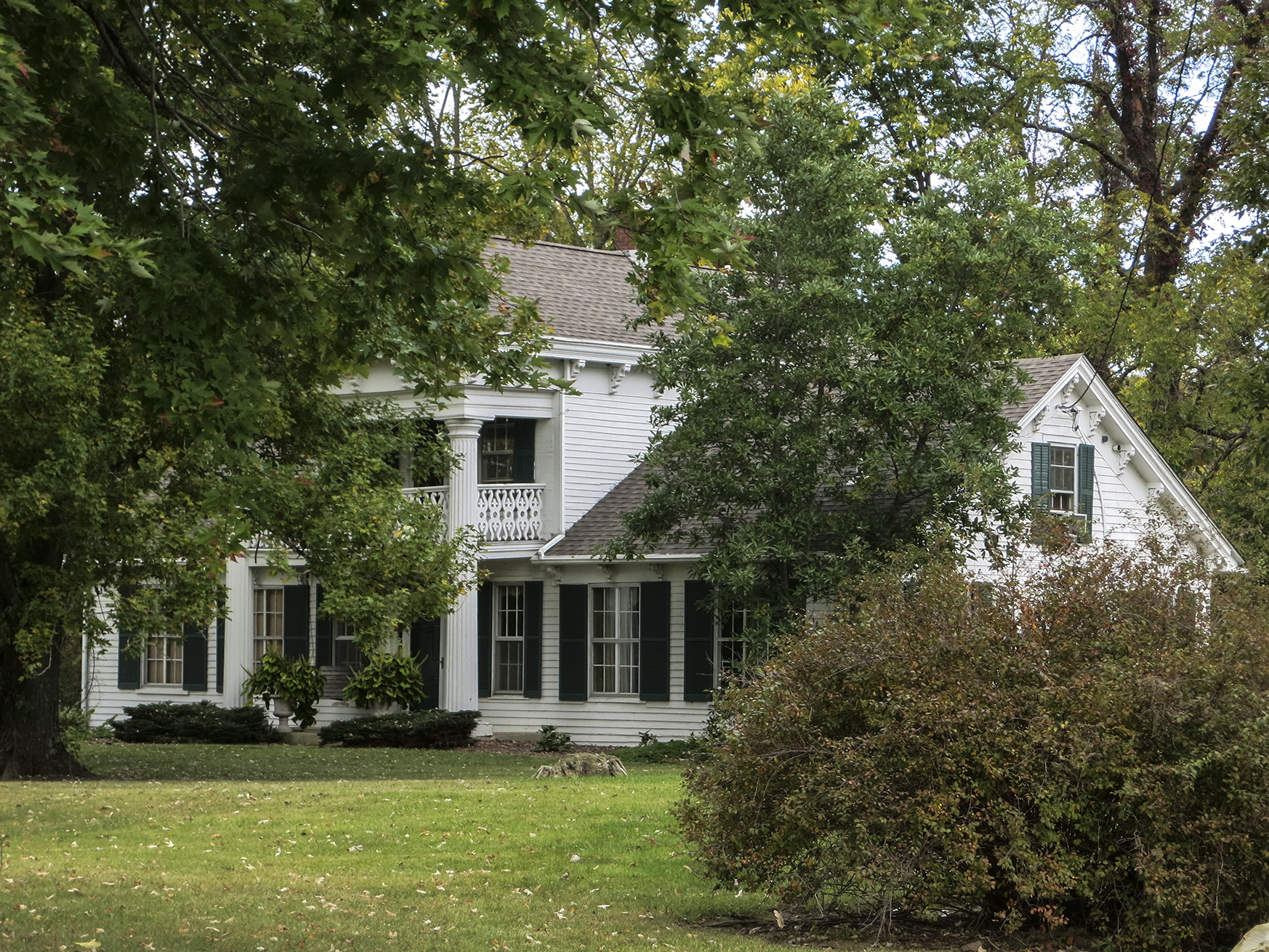
- Samuel Sharp House

- Location of Marlboro Township in Delaware County
- Coordinates: 40°25′45″N 83°3′11″W
- Country: United States
- State: Ohio
- County: Delaware

Area
  - Total: 12.0 sq mi (31.2 km^{2})
  - Land: 11.3 sq mi (29.2 km^{2})
  - Water: 0.77 sq mi (2.0 km^{2})
- Elevation: 950 ft (290 m)

Population (2020)
  - Total: 295
  - Density: 26.2/sq mi (10.1/km^{2})
- Time zone: UTC-5 (Eastern (EST))
  - Summer (DST): UTC-4 (EDT)
- FIPS code: 39-47908
- GNIS feature ID: 1086051

Marlboro Township is one of the eighteen townships of Delaware County, Ohio, United States. As of the 2020 census the population was 295.

== Geography ==
Located in the northern part of the county, it borders the following townships:

- Waldo Township, Marion County - north
- Westfield Township, Morrow County - northeast
- Oxford Township - southeast
- Troy Township - south
- Radnor Township - west
- Prospect Township, Marion County - northwest corner

No municipalities are located in Marlboro Township.

== Demographics ==
As of the 2000 census, there were 227 people, 83 households, and 67 families residing in the township.

There were 83 households, out of which 38.6% had children under the age of 18 living with them, 73.5% were married couples living together, 7.7% had a female householder with no husband present, and 19.3% were non-families. 15.7% of all households were made up of individuals, and 9.6% had someone living alone who was 65 years of age or older. The average household size was 2.73 and the average family size was 3.10.

In the township the population was spread out, with 26.4% under the age of 18, 27.4% from 18 to 24, 8.4% from 25 to 44, 24.2% from 45 to 64, and 13.6% who were 65 years of age or older. The median age was 38 years. 48.9% of the population were male, and 51.1% were female.

== Name and history ==
Marlboro Township was named after Marlborough, New York, the native hometown of many of its early settlers.

Statewide, the only other Marlboro Township is located in Stark County.

== Government ==
The township is governed by a three-member board of trustees, who are elected in November of odd-numbered years to a four-year term beginning on the following January 1. Two are elected in the year after the presidential election and one is elected in the year before it. There is also an elected township fiscal officer, who serves a four-year term beginning on April 1 of the year after the election, which is held in November of the year before the presidential election. Vacancies in the fiscal officership or on the board of trustees are filled by the remaining trustees.

== Public services ==
Fire protection in Marlboro Township is the responsibility of the Fort Morrow Fire District, and emergency medical services are provided by Delaware County EMS.
