= Porter Township, Delaware County, Ohio =

Township in Ohio, US

- Township
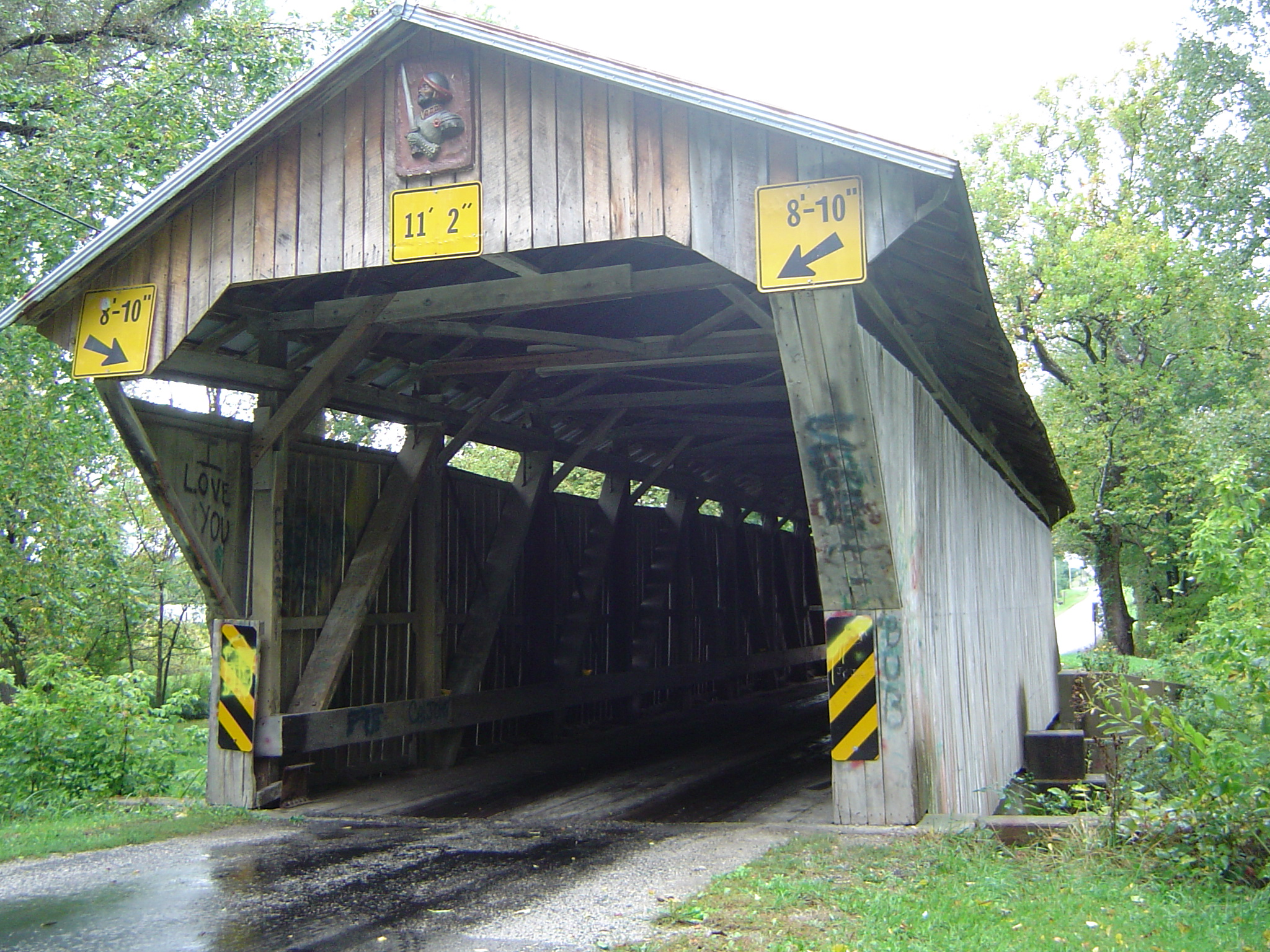
- Chambers Road Covered Bridge

- Location of Porter Township in Delaware County
- Coordinates: 40°19′21″N 82°48′16″W
- Country: United States
- State: Ohio
- County: Delaware

Area
  - Total: 25.4 sq mi (65.7 km^{2})
  - Land: 25.4 sq mi (65.7 km^{2})
  - Water: 0 sq mi (0.0 km^{2})
- Elevation: 1,109 ft (338 m)

Population (2020)
  - Total: 2,194
  - Density: 86.5/sq mi (33.4/km^{2})
- Time zone: UTC-5 (Eastern (EST))
  - Summer (DST): UTC-4 (EDT)
- FIPS code: 39-64178
- GNIS feature ID: 1086054
- Website: www.portertwp.org

Porter Township is one of the eighteen townships of Delaware County, Ohio, United States. As of the 2020 census the population was 2,194.

== Geography ==
Located in the northeastern corner of the county, it borders the following townships:

- Bennington Township, Morrow County - north
- South Bloomfield Township, Morrow County - northeast corner
- Hilliar Township, Knox County - east
- Hartford Township, Licking County - southeast corner
- Trenton Township - south
- Berkshire Township - southwest corner
- Kingston Township - west
- Peru Township, Morrow County - northwest corner

No municipalities are located in Porter Township.

== Name and history ==
Porter Township was organized in the 1820s. It was named for Hon. Robert Porter, a native of Philadelphia, Pennsylvania, who received from President John Adams a land grant in Delaware County.

Statewide, the only other Porter Township is located in Scioto County.

== Government ==
The township is governed by a three-member board of trustees, who are elected in November of odd-numbered years to a four-year term beginning on the following January 1. Two are elected in the year after the presidential election and one is elected in the year before it. There is also an elected township fiscal officer, who serves a four-year term beginning on April 1 of the year after the election, which is held in November of the year before the presidential election. Vacancies in the fiscal officership or on the board of trustees are filled by the remaining trustees.

== Public services ==
Fire protection in Porter Township is the responsibility of the Porter-Kingston Fire District, and emergency medical services are provided by the Delaware County EMS.
