= Howard (disambiguation) =

Howard is a given name.

Howard may also refer to:

== Places ==
- Howard City (disambiguation)
- Howard County (disambiguation)
- Howard Creek (disambiguation)
- Howard Lake (disambiguation)
- Howard River (disambiguation)
- Howard Springs (disambiguation)
- Howard Township (disambiguation)

=== United States ===
- Howard, Colorado
- Howard Mountain, a summit in Colorado
- Howard, Florida
- Howard, Indiana
- Howard, Kansas
- Howard, Mississippi
- Howard, New York
- Howard, Ohio
- Howard, Pennsylvania
- Howard, Rhode Island
- Howard, South Dakota
- Howard, Wisconsin, a village in Brown and Outagamie counties
- Howard, Chippewa County, Wisconsin, a town
  - Howard (community), Chippewa County, Wisconsin, an unincorporated community
- Howard City, Michigan
- Howard City, Nebraska

=== Other places ===
- Howard, Queensland, Australia
- Howard Township, Ontario, Canada

== Businesses ==
- E. Howard & Co., a clock and watch company
- Howard Aircraft Corporation
- Howard Books, a Christian publishing company

== Facilities and structures ==
- Howard station (disambiguation)
- Castle Howard, a stately home in Malton, England
- Howard Theatre, Washington, D.C.
- Howard University, a historically black university in Washington, D.C.

=== Train stations ===
- Howard station (Capital MetroRail), a Capital MetroRail station
- Howard station (CTA), a Chicago "L" station
- Howard station (LIRR), a former Long Island Railroad station
- Howard railway station, in Queensland, Australia

== Vehicles and transports ==
- Howard (skipjack), a Chesapeake Bay fishing boat on the National Register of Historic Places
- USS Howard, any of various United States Navy ships

== Other uses ==
- Howard (surname)
- Hurricane Howard (disambiguation)
- Howard (film), a 2018 American documentary film about Howard Ashman

== See also ==
- Heward
- Howie (disambiguation)
