= Howard Lake =

Howard Lake or Lake Howard may refer to:

== Lakes ==
Canada

- Howard Lake (British Columbia)
- Howard Lake (Northwest Territories)
- Howard Lake (Algoma District), Ontario
- Howard Lake (Timiskaming District), Ontario
- Howard Lake (Leeds and Grenville United Counties), Ontario
- Howard Lake (Zizania Creek, Kenora District), Ontario
- Howard Lake (Silver Lake, Kenora District), Ontario
- Howard Lake (Thunder Bay District), Ontario

United States

- Howard Lake (Mendocino County), California
- Howard Lake (central Mendocino County), California
- Lake Howard (Winter Haven, Florida)
- Howard Lake (Cook County, Minnesota)
- Howard Lake, Scott County, Minnesota
- Howard Lake (Wright County, Minnesota)
- Howard Lake (Washington)

== Settlements ==
- Lake Howard, Alabama
- Howard Lake, Minnesota

== See also ==
- Howard Prairie Lake, a reservoir in Jackson County, Oregon, United States
