= Albertville (disambiguation) =

Albertville is a commune in the Savoie department of south-eastern France.

Albertville may also refer to:

== Places ==
Canada

- Albertville, Quebec
- Albertville, Saskatchewan

Democratic Republic of the Congo

- Kalemie, formerly known as Albertville

United States

- Albertville, Alabama
- Albertville, Minnesota
- Albertville, Wisconsin, an unincorporated community
  - Old Albertville, Wisconsin, an unincorporated community

== Other uses ==
- Albertville (ship), several ships
- 1992 Winter Olympics, held at Albertville, France
- Albertville-Realschule, school in Winnenden, Baden-Württemberg, Germany
