= Hidden Lakes, Ohio =

- Census-designated place
- Location within Ohio Location within the United States
- Coordinates: 40°32′53″N 82°45′48″W
- Country: United States
- State: Ohio
- County: Morrow
- Township: Franklin

Area
  - Total: 0.254 sq mi (0.66 km^{2})
  - Land: 0.254 sq mi (0.66 km^{2})
  - Water: 0.0 sq mi (0 km^{2})
- Elevation: 1,227 ft (374 m)

Population (2020)
  - Total: 52
  - Density: 63/sq mi (24/km^{2})
- Time zone: UTC-5 (Eastern (EST))
  - Summer (DST): UTC-4 (EDT)
- ZIP Code: 43338 (Mount Gilead)
- Area codes: 419/567
- FIPS code: 39-35133
- GNIS feature ID: 2813338

Hidden Lakes is a census-designated place (CDP) in Morrow County, Ohio, United States, corresponding to the Hidden Lakes Campground community. It was first listed as a CDP for the 2020 census, at which time it had a resident population of 52. Wikipedia

Search Hidden Lakes, Ohio: Difference between revisions Article Talk Language Download PDF Watch

In recent years Hidden Lakes has been a subject of controversy as it has been overrun with squatters and drug use. There are 1,000 legally deeded lots. Out of those only 500 or so are occupied. Out of those 500 less than 200 pay dues to the association for upkeep of common ground and common buildings according to the Hidden Lakes Community Association who now governs the association. While Hidden Lakes started as a campground it has legally lost campground designation through the state. Legally they cannot refer to themselves as Hidden Lakes Campground Association as they don't have the proper licensing. The Hidden Lakes Community Associations Board is currently being investigated by Morrow County and State authorities for fraud and theft due to the improper use of association dues, self appointed positions on the governing board and lack of transparency in regards to funds collected by way of dues. Lot owners are encouraged to report any suspected violations, fraud or theft by the board to the Ohio State Attorney Generals Office. The Morrow county health department and numerous other government agencies are actively involved in trying to shut Hidden Lakes down.

== Demographics ==
Wikipedia Wikimedia Foundation Powered by MediaWiki Privacy policy Contact Wikipedia Legal & safety contacts Code of Conduct Developers Statistics Cookie statement Terms of Use Desktop view Content deleted

The CDP is in central Morrow County, in the northwest part of Franklin Township. It is bordered to the north by Congress Township and very slightly by Gilead Township. It is a recreational community built around a small artificial lake and the headwaters of the Kokosing River, a southeast-flowing tributary of the Walhonding River and part of the Muskingum River watershed leading to the Ohio.

Hidden Lakes is 4 miles (6 km) east of Mount Gilead, the Morrow county seat, and 23 miles (37 km) southwest of Mansfield.

== Demographics ==
Historical population
| Census | Pop. | Note | %± |
|---|---|---|---|
| 2020 | 16 | | — |
U.S. Decennial Census
