= Paul L. Eddy =

American politician and businessman

Paul L. Eddy (August 27, 1899 – January 14, 1979) was an American politician and businessman.

Eddy was born on a farm in Victor Township five miles southeast from Howard Lake, Wright County, Minnesota. He went to the Howard Lake public schools and graduated from Howard Lake High School in 1919. He served in the United States Navy from 1917 to 1918 during World War I. Eddy went to the University of Minnesota College of Agriculture. He was a farmer and was the owner of Paul Eddy Nursery. Eddy served in the Minnesota House of Representatives from 1951 to 1956. He died at the Veterans Hospital in Minneapolis, Minnesota.
