= Mohawk Dam =

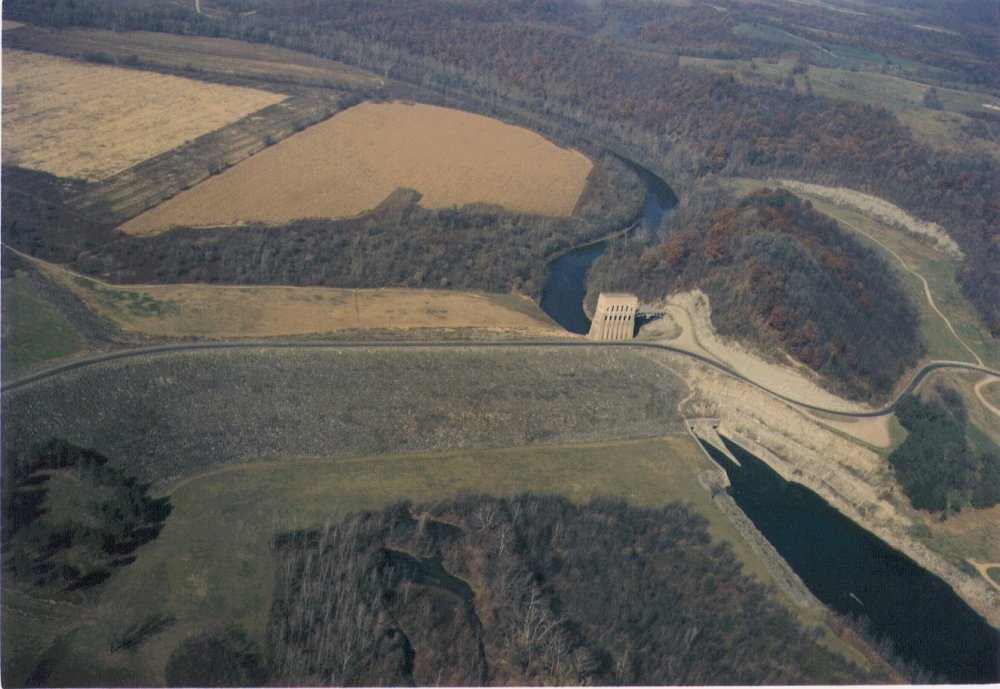
- Mohawk Dam aerial view
- Location: Jefferson Township, Coshocton County, Ohio
- Coordinates: 40.3518°N 82.0884°W
- Construction began: April 1935
- Operator(s): United States Army Corps of Engineers, Huntington District

Dam and spillways
- Impounds: Walhonding River
- Height: 111 feet (34 m)
- Length: 2,330 feet (710 m)

Reservoir
- Total capacity: 285,000 acre-feet (352,000,000 m^{3})

Mohawk Dam, located in Jefferson Township, Coshocton County, Ohio northwest of Nellie, is a dry dam constructed by the United States Army Corps of Engineers (USACE) in the mid-1930s for the purpose of flood control on the Walhonding River. The dam is part of the larger 18-county Muskingum Watershed Conservancy District (MWCD). The dam has been in service for 70 years and was recently placed on the USACE's "Urgent" dam safety classification list and plans are currently being drafted that would allocate funds for dam stabilization.

== History ==
Mohawk Dam bridge
- Coordinates: 40°21′06″N 82°05′24″W
- Carries: 2 lanes of SR 715

Construction of the Mohawk Dam was started in April 1935 and was completed in September 1937. The dam was authorized by the Flood Control Act of 1938 and was built as a dry dam along with 13 other dams in the Muskingum River Watershed for flood control and water conservation. The dam was built right across the right-of-way of the Walhonding Canal, which ran from Coshocton to Cavallo.

The dam has always operated as a dry dam, holding back water only during a flood and releasing it slowly downstream. The highest water level ever recorded at the Mohawk Dam was during the flood of January 2005, where the water reached a height of 80.01 feet (24.39 m) above its normal level.

== Future ==
The dam has been in service for 70 years but was only built with the expectation that it would function for around 50 years before sedimentation and erosion weakened the dam. The dam has weakened and several safety issues have arisen, which is why the USACE has placed it on its list of the nation's most at-risk dams, where it ranked seventh most at-risk in 2006. In 2007, the dam was classified as "Urgent", which is the second-highest classification level of the dam safety rating system used by the USACE. This classification indicates that the dam is a high federal priority for repairs since failure of the dam during a flood is moderately uncertain. The MWCD estimates that if the Mohawk Dam were to fail during a flood, the water normally held back could cost 307 people their lives and up to $449 million in property damage.

According to the MWCD, the dam's greatest problem is the inherent downstream seepage that occurs with most earthen dams. In the case of the Mohawk Dam, this condition is exacerbated by the fact that it was built on highly permeable land, which could cause instability if too much water were to seep through the lower part of the dam. A rehabilitation and repair plan to stabilize the structure has not yet been established, nor has an official cost-estimate been prepared. Funds were set aside by Congress in 2006 and 2007 to analyze the current state of the dam and gather data for a rehabilitation report. The MWCD serves as the local sponsor of the rehabilitation projects and must pay 3.45 percent of the costs. The remainder will be paid by the federal government. In order to pay for their share, the MWCD will levy an assessment of the properties in its 18-county district, requiring those property owners to pay for the dam improvements throughout the entire watershed. The total local-share cost to be paid by the MWCD for the work on four of the dams, including the Mohawk Dam, is estimated to be between $95 million and $135 million.

== Gallery ==
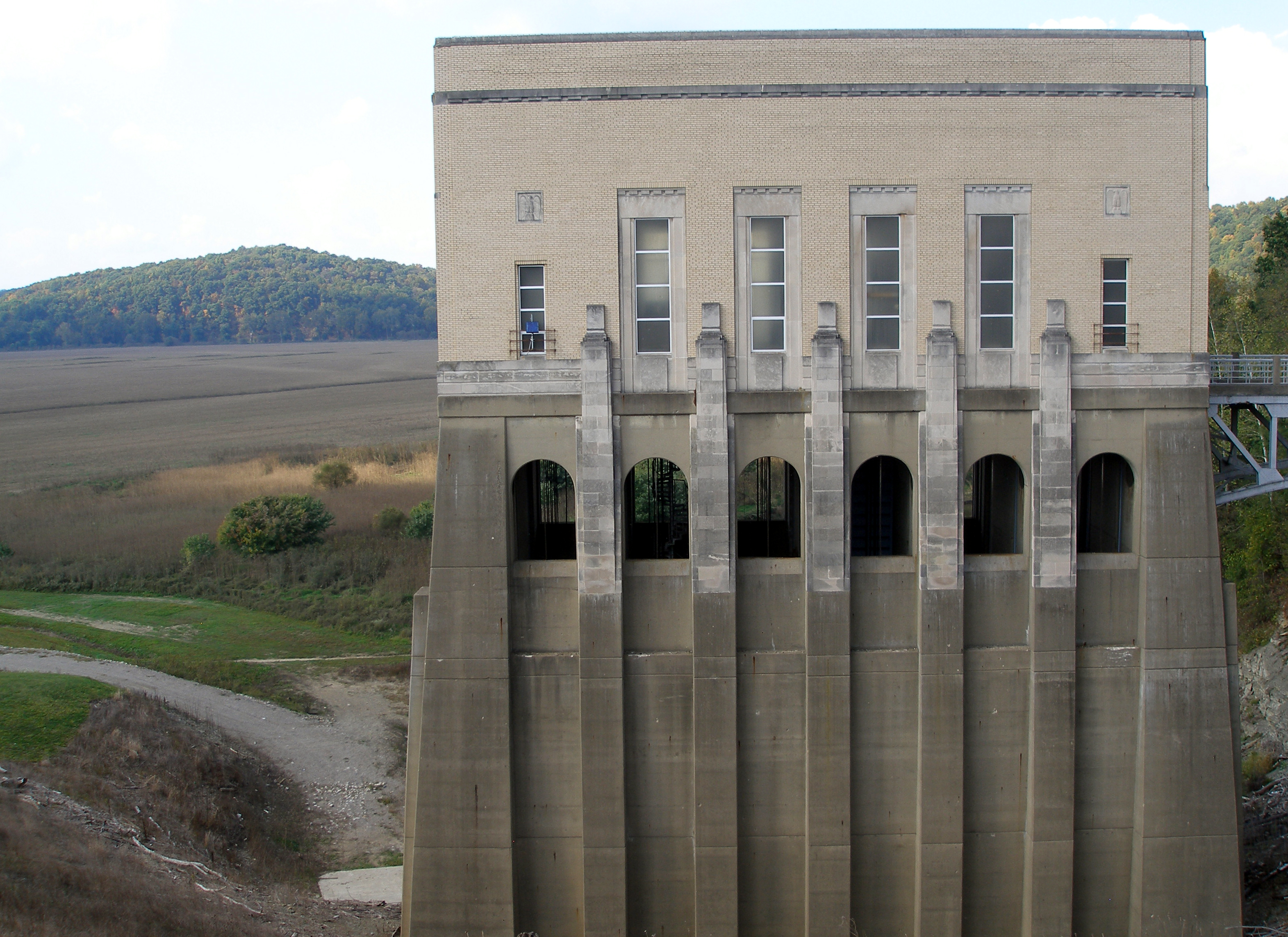
Looking northwest from the top of the dam into the reservoir area behind the dam.

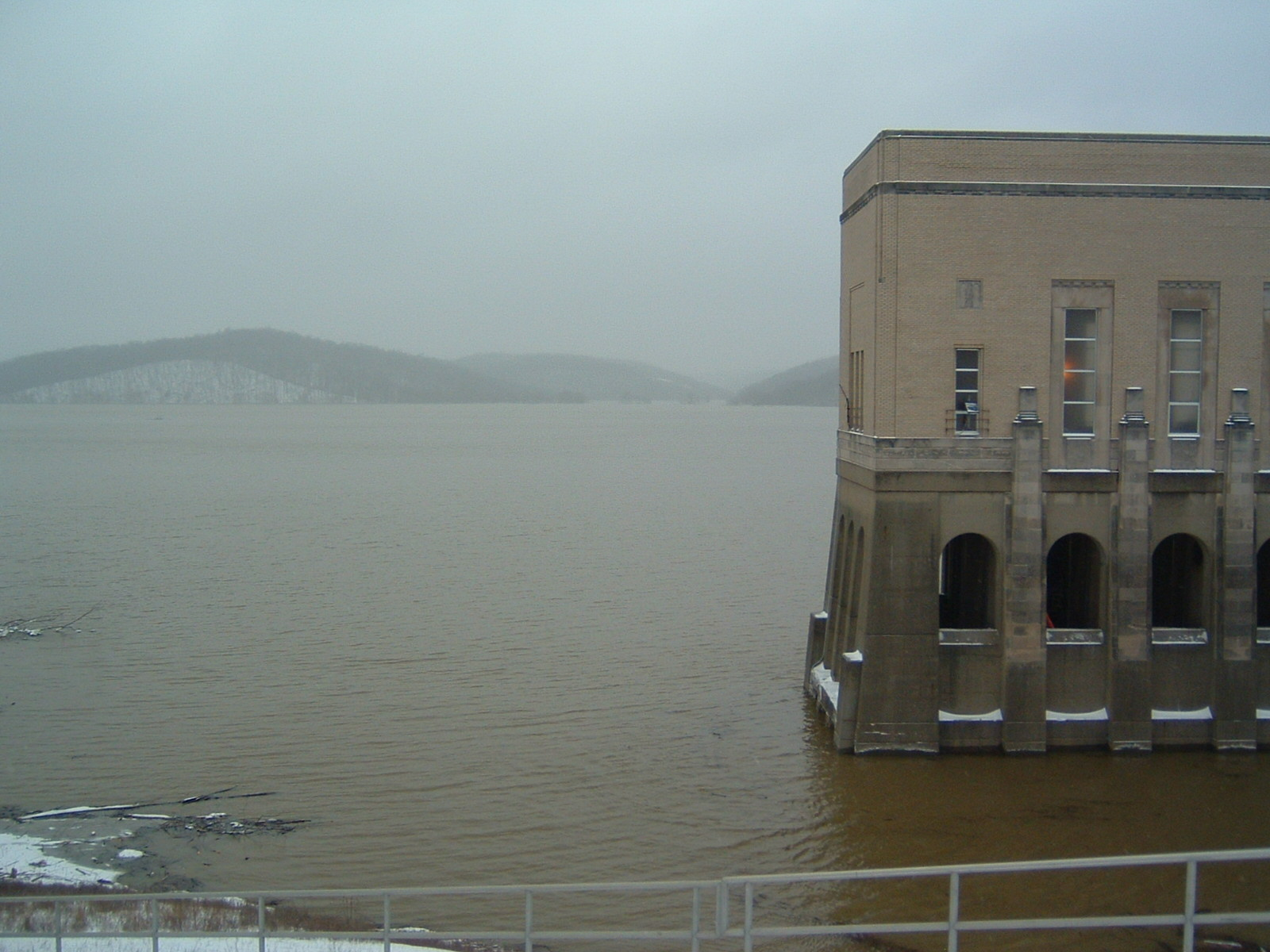
An image from the top of the dam during the January 2005 flood when the water reached its highest point in the dam's history.
