= Howie (disambiguation) =

Howie is a common name for people:

- Howie (given name)
- Howie, surname

Howie may also refer to:

In other uses:

- Howie (TV series), a 1992 American television series
- Howie, Alberta, a community in Canada
- Howies, British clothing brand
