= Howard Lake (Mendocino County) =

Lake in northwest Mendocino County, California

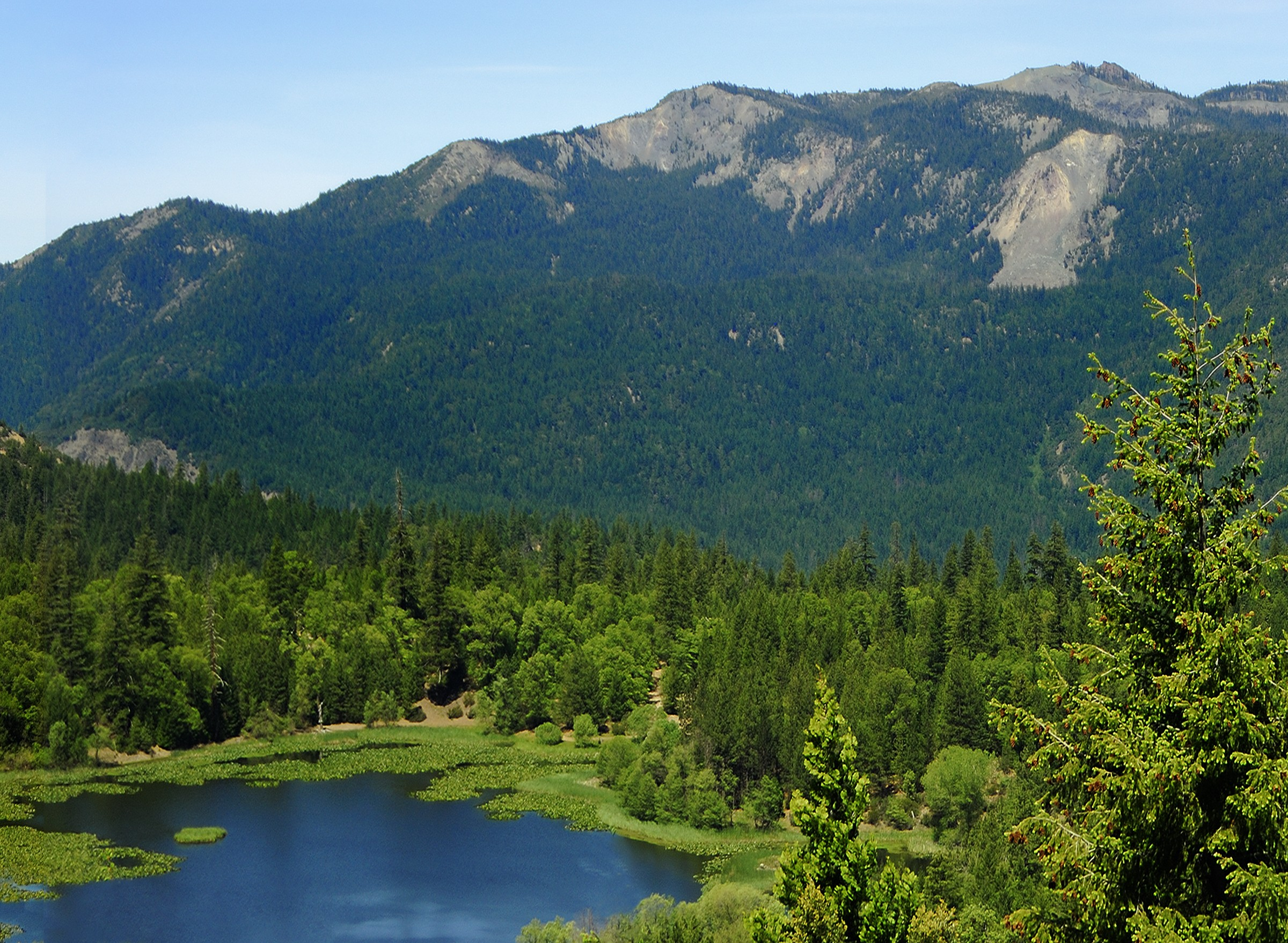
- Howard Lake and Leech Lake Mountain

- Location within California Location within the United States
- Location: Mendocino National Forest; Mendocino County, California
- Coordinates: 39.8802°N 122.9896°W
- Surface area: 20 acres (8.1 ha)
- Surface elevation: 3,852 ft (1,174 m)

Howard Lake is a natural lake in northwestern Mendocino County, California, located in the Mendocino National Forest at an elevation of 3,852 feet (1,174 m). It covers an area of 20 acres (8.1 ha). The lake hosts a small campground and is a popular primitive camping experience. In some years, the U.S. Forest Service stocks the lake with rainbow trout.

Howard Lake should not be confused with the lake of the same name located 21 miles (34 km) to the southwest.

== See also ==
- List of lakes in California
