= Kokosing Gap Trail =

Rail trail in Knox County, Ohio, USA

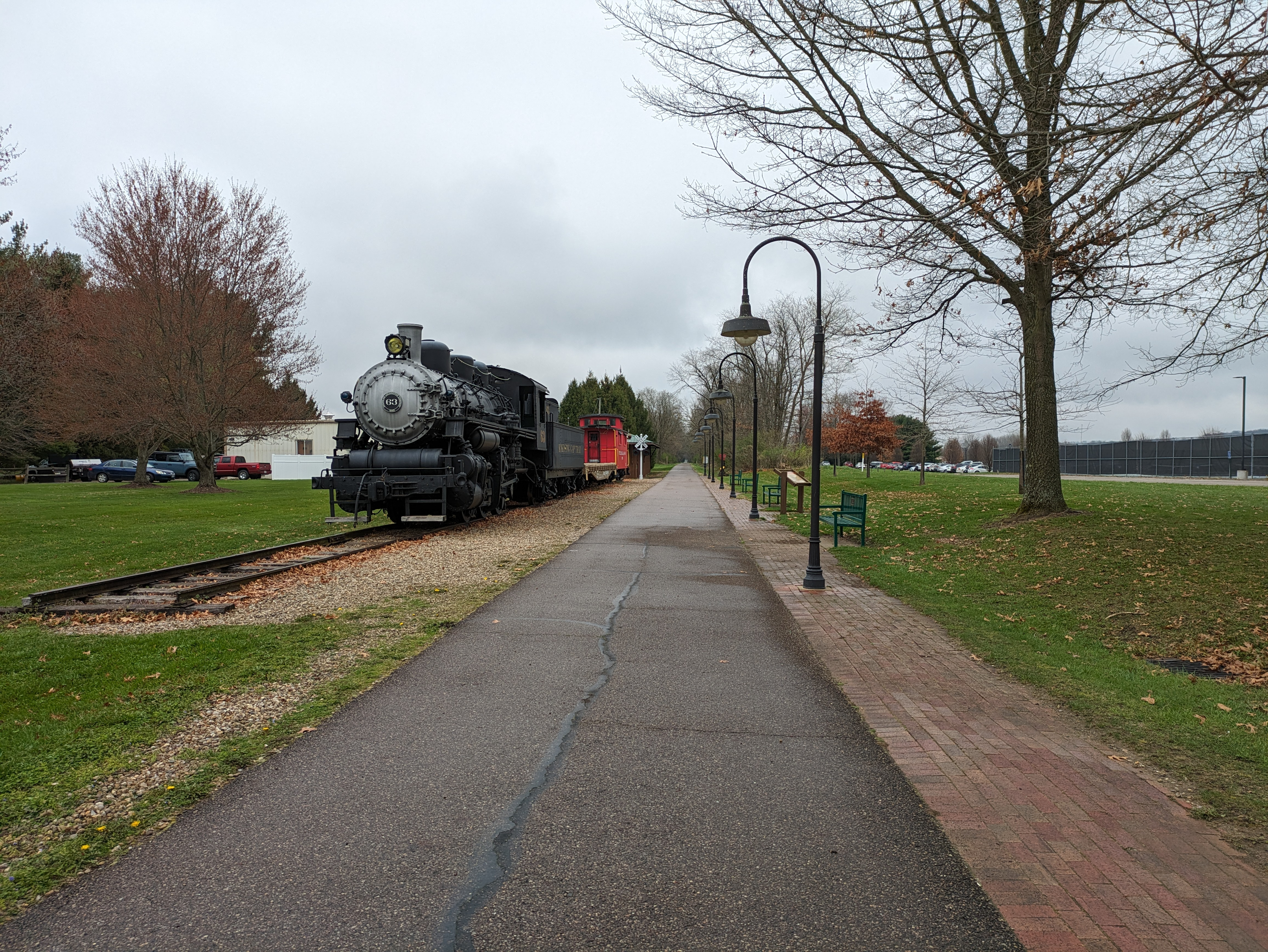
- Restored locomotive alongside the trail in Gambier
- Length: 14 miles (23 km)
- Location: Knox County, Ohio
- Established: 1991
- Trailheads: Mount Vernon, Ohio; Gambier, Ohio; Howard, Ohio; Danville, Ohio
- Use: Cycling, walking
- Elevation gain/loss: 19 feet (5.8 m) loss
- Highest point: 978 feet (298 m)
- Lowest point: 898 feet (274 m)
- Grade: 0%
- Difficulty: easy
- Season: Year round
- Sights: Kokosing River; Kenyon College
- Surface: Paved asphalt, wooden boardwalks
- Right of way: Pennsylvania Railroad
- Maintained by: Kokosing Gap Trail Board
- Website: www.kokosinggaptrail.org

Trail map
- Map

The Kokosing Gap Trail is a 14-mile (23-kilometer) recreational trail built on a former Pennsylvania Railroad right-of-way alongside the Kokosing River in east central Ohio. The trail connects Mount Vernon to Danville via Gambier and Howard.

== History ==
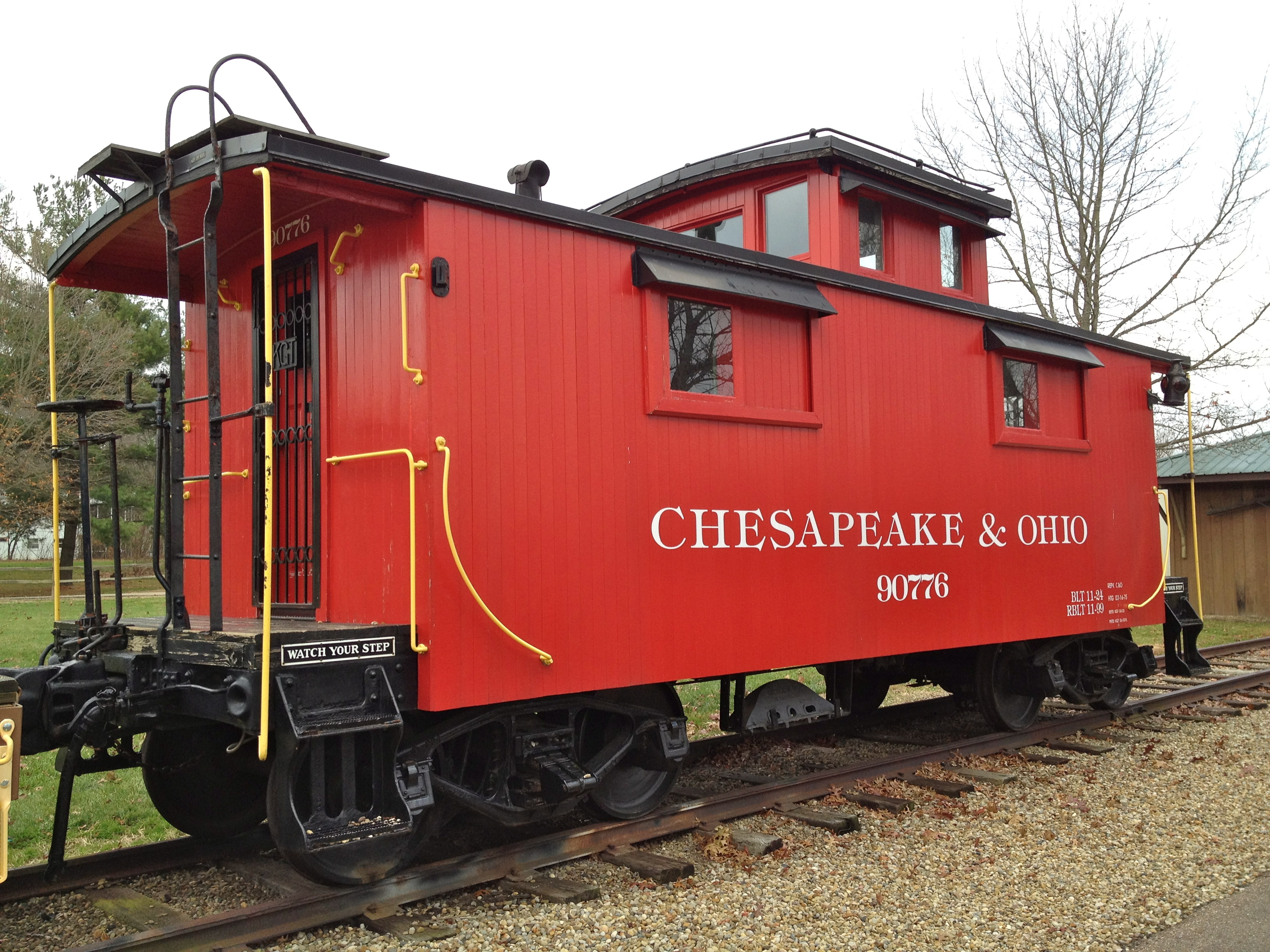
Restored caboose at Gambier

Opened in 1991, the 10-foot (3.0 m) wide paved trail was designed for bicycling, walking and rollerblading. The trail begins in Mt. Vernon's Phillips Park, by a gravel parking area, and runs eastward along Knox County’s Kokosing River past forested hills, wetlands, and family farms. At Gambier, the trail runs through the campus of Kenyon College. A cosmetically restored 1940s-era ALCO 0-6-0 steam locomotive, tender, flatcar and caboose sit alongside the trail here; there are also a restroom and benches. From Gambier, the trail continues northeast toward Howard, underneath Route 36 through a stone-arched tunnel, and then on towards Danville.

This trail is the longest paved rail trail in the U.S. maintained solely by volunteers and donations.

Wildlife along the trail includes white-tailed deer, gray squirrel, chipmunk, groundhog, mink, wild turkey, great blue heron, bald eagle, and several species of hawk and owl. Spring and summer wild flowers include trillium, mayapple, and jack-in-the-pulpit.

== Location ==
- Western terminus: Phillips Park in Mount Vernon at 40°23′07″N 82°28′13″W
- Eastern terminus: West of Danville at 40°26′36″N 82°15′58″W
