= Howard Lake City Hall =

- U.S. National Register of Historic Places
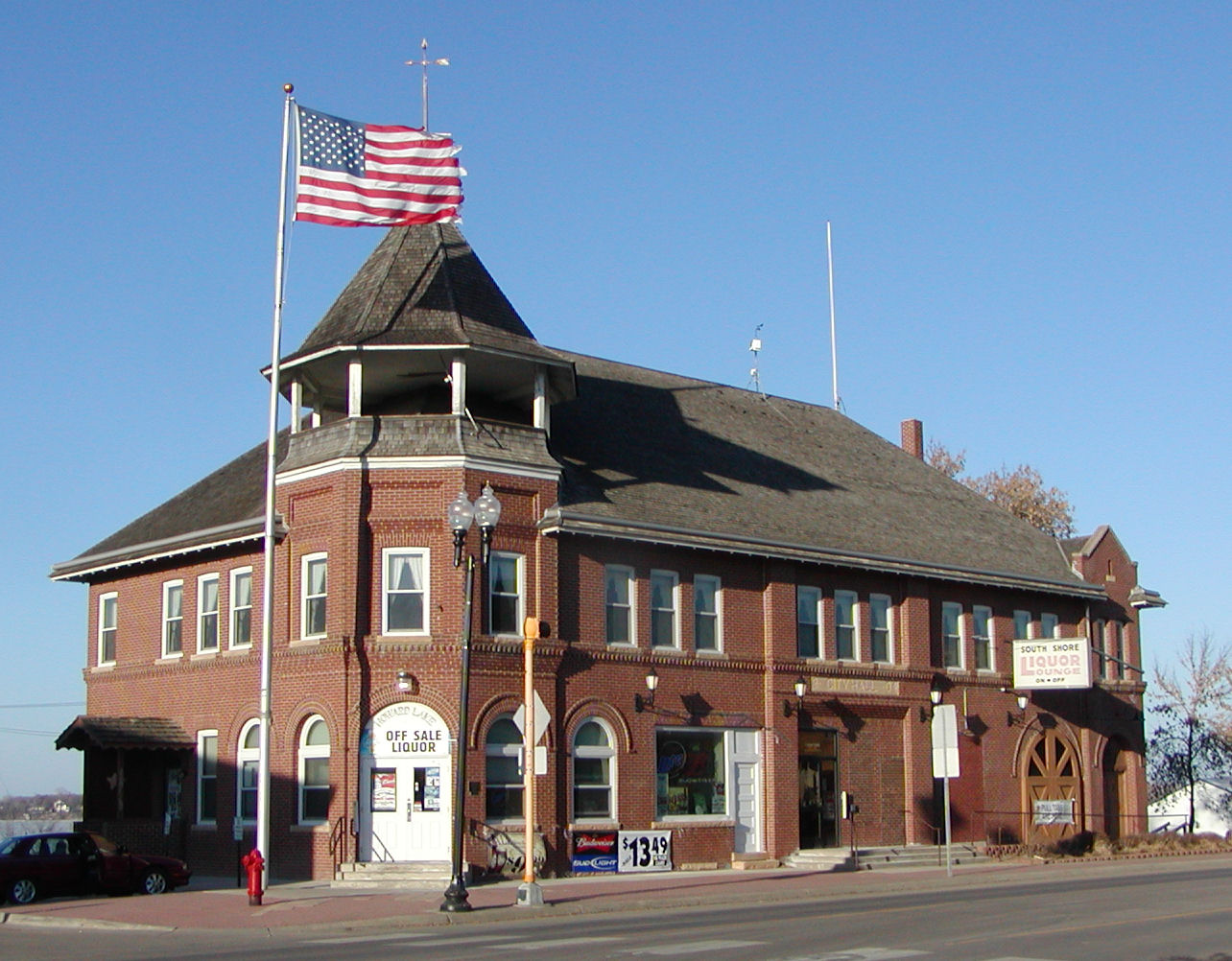
- Howard Lake City Hall from the southwest

- Location within Minnesota Location within the United States
- Location: 737, 739, and 741 6th Street, Howard Lake, Minnesota
- Coordinates: 45°3′39.4″N 94°4′12.5″W
- Area: Less than one acre
- Built: 1904
- Architect: I.A. Hancock
- Architectural style: Queen Anne
- MPS: Wright County MRA
- NRHP reference No.: 79001269
- Added to NRHP: December 11, 1979

The historic Howard Lake City Hall is a multipurpose government building in Howard Lake, Minnesota, United States, built in 1904. It originally housed the city's government offices, post office, public library, fire department, and public meeting hall. In the 1930s the city began operating a municipal liquor store in the building, which remains the building's primary use today as most other functions have moved to newer facilities. The Howard Lake City Hall was listed on the National Register of Historic Places in 1979 for having local significance in the themes of architecture and politics/government. It was nominated as an example of early-20th-century small-town government architecture, and as Howard Lake's most prominent building.

== See also ==
- List of city and town halls in the United States
- National Register of Historic Places listings in Wright County, Minnesota
