= Victor Township, Wright County, Minnesota =

Victor Township, Minnesota
- Township
- Location within the state of Minnesota Victor Township, Minnesota (the United States)
- Coordinates: 45°2′N 94°3′W
- Country: United States
- State: Minnesota
- County: Wright

Area
  - Total: 34.4 sq mi (89.1 km^{2})
  - Land: 32.4 sq mi (83.9 km^{2})
  - Water: 2.0 sq mi (5.2 km^{2})
- Elevation: 991 ft (302 m)

Population (2000)
  - Total: 1,069
  - Density: 33/sq mi (12.7/km^{2})
- Time zone: UTC-6 (Central (CST))
  - Summer (DST): UTC-5 (CDT)
- FIPS code: 27-67018
- GNIS feature ID: 0665868

Victor Township is a township in Wright County, Minnesota, United States. The population was 1,069 at the 2000 census.

== History ==
Victor Township was organized in 1866, and named after Victor, New York.

== Geography ==
According to the United States Census Bureau, the township has a total area of 34.4 square miles (89.1 km^{2}), of which 32.4 square miles (83.9 km^{2}) is land and 2.0 square miles (5.2 km^{2}) (5.87%) is water.

The city of Howard Lake is located within the township geographically, but is a separate entity.

Victor Township is located in Township 118 North of the Arkansas Base Line and Range 27 West of the 5th Principal Meridian.

== Demographics ==
As of the census of 2000, there were 1,069 people, 355 households, and 281 families residing in the township. The population density was 33.0 inhabitants per square mile (12.7/km^{2}). There were 405 housing units at an average density of 12.5/sq mi (4.8/km^{2}). The racial makeup of the township was 98.60% White, 0.28% African American, 0.56% Asian, 0.19% from other races, and 0.37% from two or more races. Hispanic or Latino of any race were 0.28% of the population.

There were 355 households, out of which 43.1% had children under the age of 18 living with them, 69.0% were married couples living together, 5.9% had a female householder with no husband present, and 20.8% were non-families. 17.7% of all households were made up of individuals, and 7.0% had someone living alone who was 65 years of age or older. The average household size was 3.01 and the average family size was 3.44.

In the township the population was spread out, with 33.5% under the age of 18, 5.7% from 18 to 24, 28.1% from 25 to 44, 24.0% from 45 to 64, and 8.7% who were 65 years of age or older. The median age was 36 years. For every 100 females, there were 111.3 males. For every 100 females age 18 and over, there were 108.5 males.

The median income for a household in the township was $49,514, and the median income for a family was $52,583. Males had a median income of $37,917 versus $24,219 for females. The per capita income for the township was $18,217. About 3.8% of families and 4.3% of the population were below the poverty line, including 2.9% of those under age 18 and 6.6% of those age 65 or over.
