= Tim Foecke =

American metallurgist

Timothy Foecke (born 1963) is an American metallurgist, former research professor at the University of Maryland - College Park, and founder and former director of the NIST Center for Automotive Lightweighting at the National Institute of Standards and Technology (NIST).

== Biography ==
Foecke was born in Missouri, moving at age two to Edina, Minnesota and at age twelve to a farm north of Howard Lake, Minnesota. He graduated from Howard Lake-Waverly High School in 1982. When he was a high school senior, and the chemistry teacher was ill for three months, he taught chemistry to the juniors.

Foecke received a bachelor's degree in 1986 and Ph.D. in materials science and engineering in 1991, both from the University of Minnesota. His thesis work, completed under Professor William W. Gerberich, involved the interaction of cracks and crack tip emitted dislocations on toughening in crystals and measured the effect of lattice flow stress on the critical stress intensity for dislocation emission from a Mode I crack in a series of single crystal alkali halide solid solutions.

He was awarded a National Research Council Post-Doctoral Fellowship at NIST to work with Dr. Robb M. Thomson in 1991 to study dislocation generation and motion in nanomaterials. He observed the generation and motion of Orowan dislocations from misfit interfacial sources in single crystal Cu/Ni nanolayered composites in an in situ TEM deformation experiment.

Foecke is a second cousin to NFL placekicker Adam Vinatieri (their mothers were first cousins) and is a third cousin of Evel Knievel.

== Work ==
Beginning in 1996, Foecke has been involved in the forensic examination of the structure and mechanical properties of metals recovered from the wreck of the RMS Titanic, and has been involved in expeditions in 1996, 1998, and 2004. He performed experiments on several hull fragments and definitively disproved the theory that the steel used to construct the hull of the Titanic was inferior and brittle. He was the originator of the "rivet theory" to explain the rapid sinking of the Titanic. His initial report on the hull steel and rivets was published in 1998. This study was greatly expanded in collaboration with Dr. Jennifer Hooper McCarty in her Ph.D. thesis work at Johns Hopkins University and was published in 2008 in the book "What Really Sank the Titanic - New Forensic Discoveries" (Citadel Press) and has been published as a German translation "Warum sank die Titanic wirklich?: Neue forensische Erkenntnisse (Springer Vieweg) (2012)".

Foecke was a member of the National Construction Safety Team that analyzed the collapse of the World Trade Center on September 11, 2001, and was responsible for all failure analysis and fractography of steel components, forensic image analysis of images and video footage contributed by the public and media organizations to identify damage and failure mechanisms of the steel components impacted by the aircraft and ascertain the integrity of the fireproofing on the steel, and investigations looking into evidence of maximum temperatures reached by recovered building components.

Foecke led a project at NIST that created a finite element model of the wreck of the USS Arizona, attempting to estimate the remaining lifespan before the collapse and to provide a mechanism to test remediation techniques before implementing them on the monument. Foecke is also a consultant on conservation efforts on the wrecks of the CSS Hunley and USS Monitor.

Foecke has been involved in a project attempting to stabilize and conserve the Inconel components of the Apollo 11 first stage Rocketdyne F-1 engine recovered from the bottom of the Atlantic Ocean.

He has been involved in several television science productions as an interviewee and consultant, including Titanic - Anatomy of a Disaster (Discovery Channel), Titanic Live (Discovery Channel), Titanic - Answers from the Abyss (Discovery Channel), Collapse of the World Trade Center (Discovery Canada), Seconds from Disaster - Sinking of the RMS Titanic (National Geographic Channel), Living in a Material World (Discovery Science Channel), Return to Titanic (National Geographic Channel), Science of Superhuman Strength (Discovery Channel), and Humanless Earth (NOVA).

Foecke's work has been covered in the media extensively, with front-page articles in The New York Times and The Washington Post, as well as interviews with TV, radio and print media around the world. He was the first "mystery guests" on the NPR series Wait, Wait, Don't Tell Me who was not employed by NPR, appearing on the 5th ever broadcast on January 31, 1998. Foecke was asked to contribute to Time Magazine's "60 Second Symposium" on the topic of metallurgy in 1999.

Foecke helped the Science Museum of Maryland in Baltimore develop the exhibit "Science of the Titanic", which tours children's museums in the US and has delivered over 200 presentations to school groups from elementary to college on various forensic topics, including "What Sank the Titanic" and "Cool, Old, Famous Broken Stuff", attempting to interest kids in STEM field careers.

Foecke is the founder and past director of the NIST Center for Automotive Lightweighting, the mission is helping the US auto industry get lighter, next-generation materials into vehicle bodies. A $4M, congressionally-funded project, current work involves complex, multipath, and high-rate testing of materials such as carbon fiber composites and advanced high-strength steels and using the data to generate constitutive models used in finite element design of car bodies and the needed manufacturing tools.

Foecke was a consultant to the National Capital Planning Commission on materials selection and durability for the Eisenhower Memorial on Maryland Avenue in Washington, DC and was part of the NIST team that assisted the Architect of the Capital with issues welding 150 year old cast steel frame components during the remediation of the Capital Dome.

From 2001-2012, Foecke was an adjunct professor of materials science and engineering at Johns Hopkins University in Baltimore, Maryland, and since 2010 has been an adjunct professor of materials science and engineering at the University of Maryland - College Park, teaching courses in thermodynamics/kinetics of materials, structure/property relationships in materials and he developed a new course in engineering materials selection, which after one year as an elective was moved by the department to be a required core class. In 2017 he expanded the curriculum with a class on high-strength metallic materials and a University Honors seminar course on the root causes of historic engineering failures. Foecke retired from federal government service after 28 years in November 2019 and joined the Department of Materials Science and Engineering at the University of Maryland - College Park full-time as a lecturing professor until May 2022.

Foecke has a Bacon Number of 2 (Martin Sheen having been the narrator of the Discovery Channel documentary Titanic-Anatomy of a Disaster, and co-starred in the movie JFK with Kevin Bacon), and an Erdős number of 4 (via Robb Thomson to Peter Bergmann To Ernst G. Straus to Paul Erdős), giving him an Erdős–Bacon number of 6.

== Patents ==
US 10,761,002 - "Shear Loader and Performing Pure Mode II or Mixed Mode I and Mode II Shear Loading", with Matthias Merzkirch and Edward Pompa (September 1, 2020).

== Honors and awards ==
- Exxon Fellowship (1986–1991)
- Materials Research Society Graduate Student Award (1990)
- National Research Council Post-Doctoral Fellow (1991–1993)
- The Captain Joseph Linnard Prize of the Society of Naval Architects and Marine Engineers (1997)
- Named "Hero of Public Service" by the Council for Excellence in Government and the Ford Foundation (1998)
- United States Department of Commerce Gold Medal (for his part in the World Trade Center collapse investigation) (2005)
- NIST - William P. Slichter Award (recognizing excellence in interactions with industry) (2011)
- Excellence in Teaching Award (College Level) - Maryland Association of Science Teachers (2012)
- Distinguished Team Award (shared) - US Department of Energy (2019) - For advanced mechanical testing of carbon fiber composites for automotive lightweighting
