= Howard River =

Howard River may refer to:

- Howard River, Northern Territory, Australia
- Hinemoatū / Howard River in the South Island of New Zealand.

== See also ==
- Howard Creek (disambiguation)
- Howard (disambiguation)
