= Howard Springs =

Howard Springs may refer to any of the following places:

== Australia ==
- Howard Springs, Northern Territory, a locality near Darwin, housing a quarantine facility
- Howard Springs Hunting Reserve, a protected area in the Northern Territory
- Howard Springs Nature Park, a protected area in the Northern Territory

== United States ==
- Howard Springs, California
- Howard Springs (Crockett County, Texas)

== See also ==
- Howard (disambiguation)
