= Howard Creek =

Howard Creek may refer to:

- Howard Creek (Colorado), a stream
- Howard Creek, Howard Draw, Reagan County, Texas, USA; a stream
- Howard Creek, Oregon, USA; a stream, see List of rivers of Oregon

== See also ==
- Howard River (disambiguation)
- Howard (disambiguation)
