= Howard City =

Howard City or City of Howard, refers to multiple settlements in the United States:

- Howard City, Michigan
- Howard City, Nebraska, also called Boelus
- Howard, Kansas, officially "City of Howard"

== See also ==
- Howard (disambiguation), for cities named "Howard"
