= Howard, Florida =

Neighborhood in Kendall, Florida, U.S.

Howard is a historically Black neighborhood in Kendall, an unincorporated community and CDP located in Miami-Dade County, Florida, United States. It is unique in that it constitutes a tiny African-American enclave within Kendall, a highly suburban area that is predominately Hispanic. It is situated in a relatively upscale area, nearby Pinecrest, within the area of The Falls shopping mall. It possess its own street grid that separates it from the surrounding area, with access into the community on Howard Drive, continuing just three small blocks until it dead ends into upscale suburbs. Its ZIP code is 33176.

== Geography ==
It is located at 25.647°N 80.334°W, with an elevation 10 feet (3.0 m).
