= Albertville, Wisconsin =

- Unincorporated community
- Location within Wisconsin Location within the United States
- Coordinates: 44°57′36″N 91°36′02″W
- Country: United States
- State: Wisconsin
- County: Chippewa
- Town: Howard
- Elevation: 1,004 ft (306 m)
- Time zone: UTC-6 (Central (CST))
  - Summer (DST): UTC-5 (CDT)
- Area codes: 715 & 534
- GNIS feature ID: 1560729

Albertville is an unincorporated community located in the town of Howard, Chippewa County, Wisconsin, United States. The community was named after Albert Halvorsen, a barber and shopkeeper in Eau Claire.
