= Howie, Alberta =

Coordinates: 50.90012°N 111.268432°W

Howie is a locality in Alberta, Canada.

James Howie, an early postmaster, gave the community his last name.
