= Howard station =

Howard station may refer to:

- Howard station (Capital MetroRail), a commuter rail station in Austin, Texas, United States
- Howard station (CTA), a Chicago Transit Authority station in Chicago, Illinois, United States
- Howard station (LIRR), a former Long Island Rail Road station in Queens, New York, United States
- Howard railway station, in Queensland, Australia
