= List of ships named Albertville =

Albertville may refer to one of six ships operated by the Compagnie Belge Maritime du Congo and Compagnie Maritime Belge:

- SS Albertville (1896), operated from 1896 to 1898. Then sold and renamed to Jebba. Wrecked in 1907.
- SS Albertville (1898), operated from 1898 to 1905. Later renamed to Aro.
- SS Albertville (1906), operated from 1906 to 1910. Then sold and in 1911 renamed to Elmina, in 1928 to Iphigenia and in 1933 to Cairo City. Broken up in 1948.
- SS Albertville (1912), operated from 1912 to 1923. Then sold and renamed to Angola. Broken up in 1950.
- SS Albertville (1928), operated from 1928 to 1940 when sunk by German airplanes in the Battle of France.
- MS Albertville, operated from 1948 to 1973 when broken up.
SS Albertville (1906)

SS Albertville (1912)

SS Albertville (1928)

MS Albertville (1948)
