= Kokosing River =

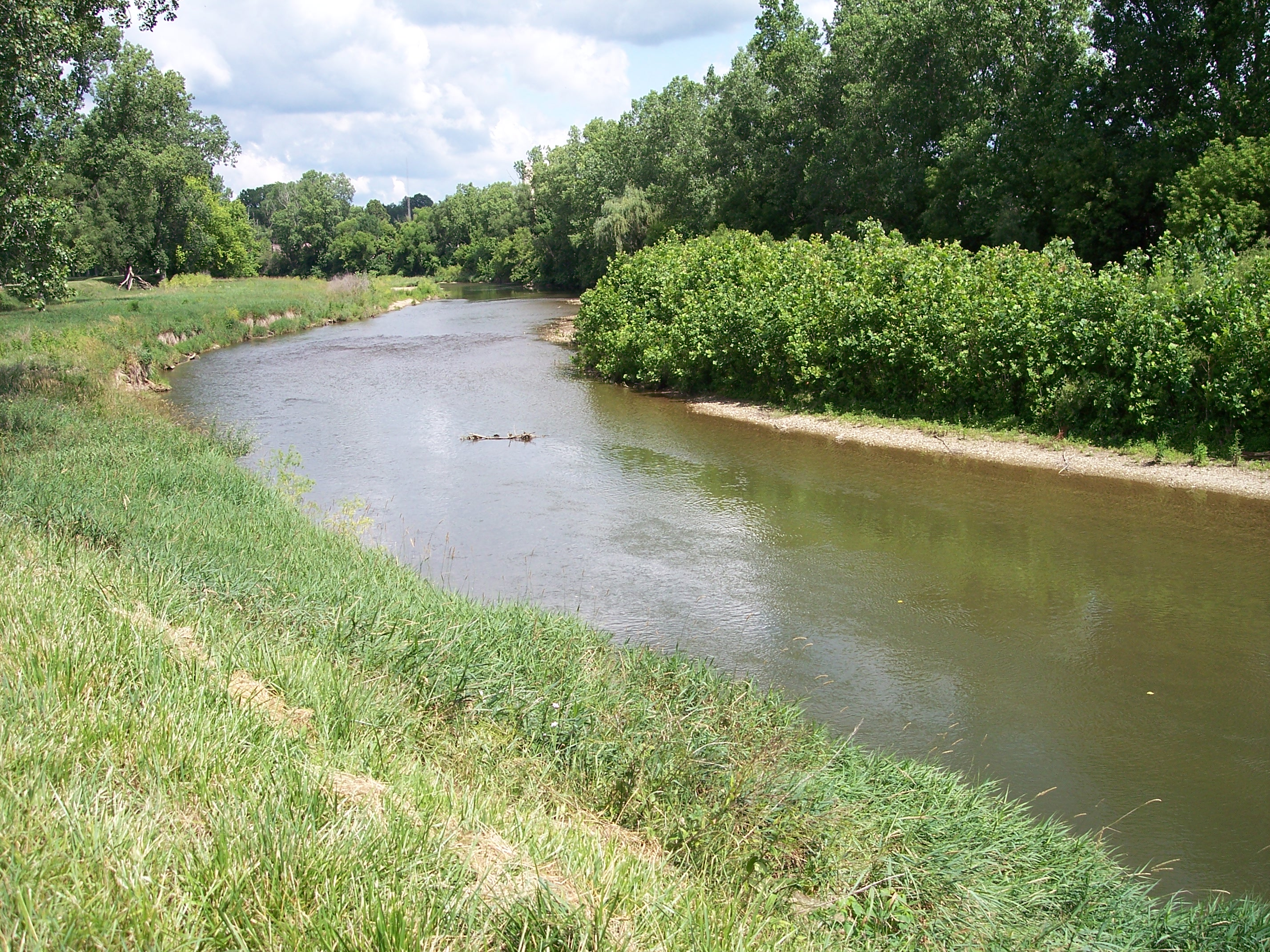
- The Kokosing River in Mount Vernon

Location
- Country: United States

Physical characteristics
- Source
  - location: Morrow County, Ohio
- Mouth
  - location: Walhonding River, western Coshocton County, Ohio
  - coordinates: 40°21′36″N 82°9′36″W
- Length: 57.2 mi (92.1 km)
- Basin size: 482 mi^{2} (1,250 km^{2})
- Discharge
  - location: Millwood
  - average: 480.9 cu ft/s (13.62 m^{3}/s), USGS water years 1922-1974
- Discharge
  - location: mouth
  - average: 547.18 cu ft/s (15.494 m^{3}/s) (estimate)

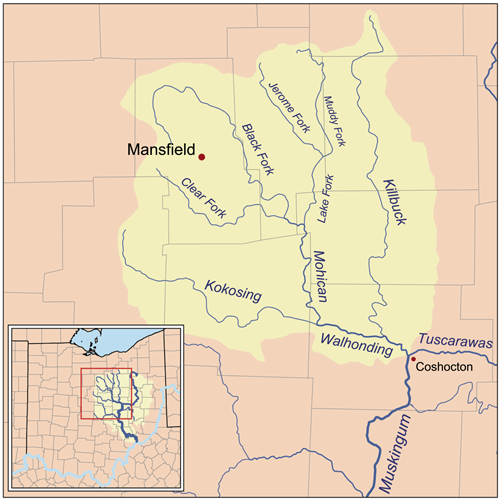
Map of the Walhonding watershed showing Kokosing River

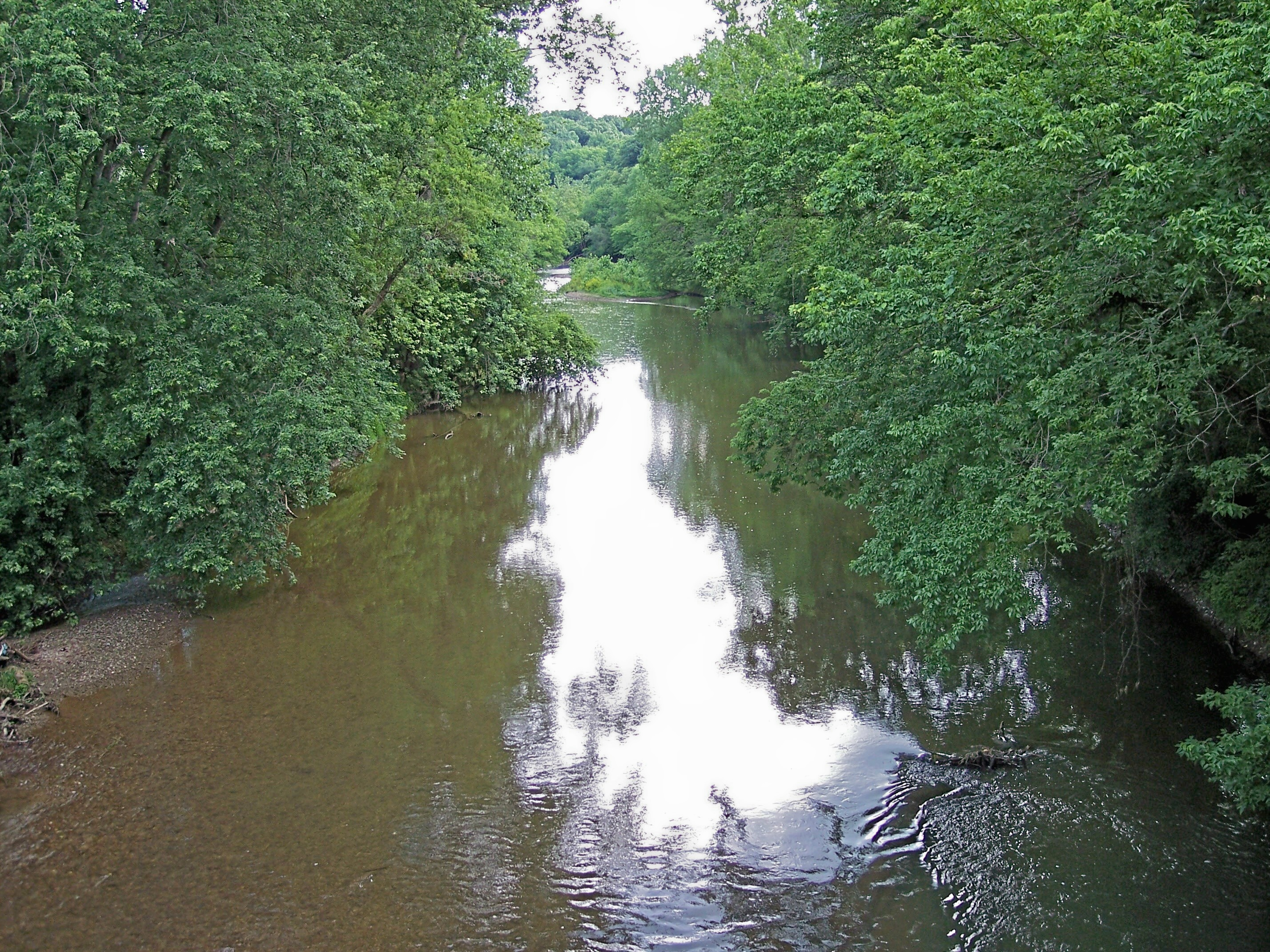
The Kokosing River as viewed from the Kokosing Gap Trail near Gambier

The Kokosing River (ko-KO-sing) is a tributary of the Walhonding River, 57.2 miles (92.1 km) long, in east-central Ohio in the United States. Via the Walhonding, Muskingum and Ohio Rivers, it is part of the watershed of the Mississippi River, draining an area of 482 square miles (1248 km^{2}). Etymologically, "Kokosing" translates roughly to "River of Little Owls" in Lenape language. The Kokosing River rises in Morrow County, northeast of Mount Gilead, and initially flows southwardly. It turns eastwardly near Chesterville and flows through Knox and Coshocton Counties, passing the communities of Mount Vernon, Gambier and Howard. In western Coshocton County the Kokosing joins the Mohican River to form the Walhonding River, about 2 miles (3 km) northwest of Nellie.

Upstream of Mount Vernon, the Kokosing collects its largest tributary, the North Branch Kokosing River, which rises in Morrow County and flows southeastwardly through Knox County, past Fredericktown.

Between Mount Vernon and Howard, the river is roughly paralleled by a rail trail, the Kokosing Gap Trail which continues to the town of Danville.

== Variant names ==
According to the Geographic Names Information System, the Kokosing River has also been known historically as:

- Kokoshing River
- Kokosing Stream
- Owl Creek
- Vernon
- Vernon River

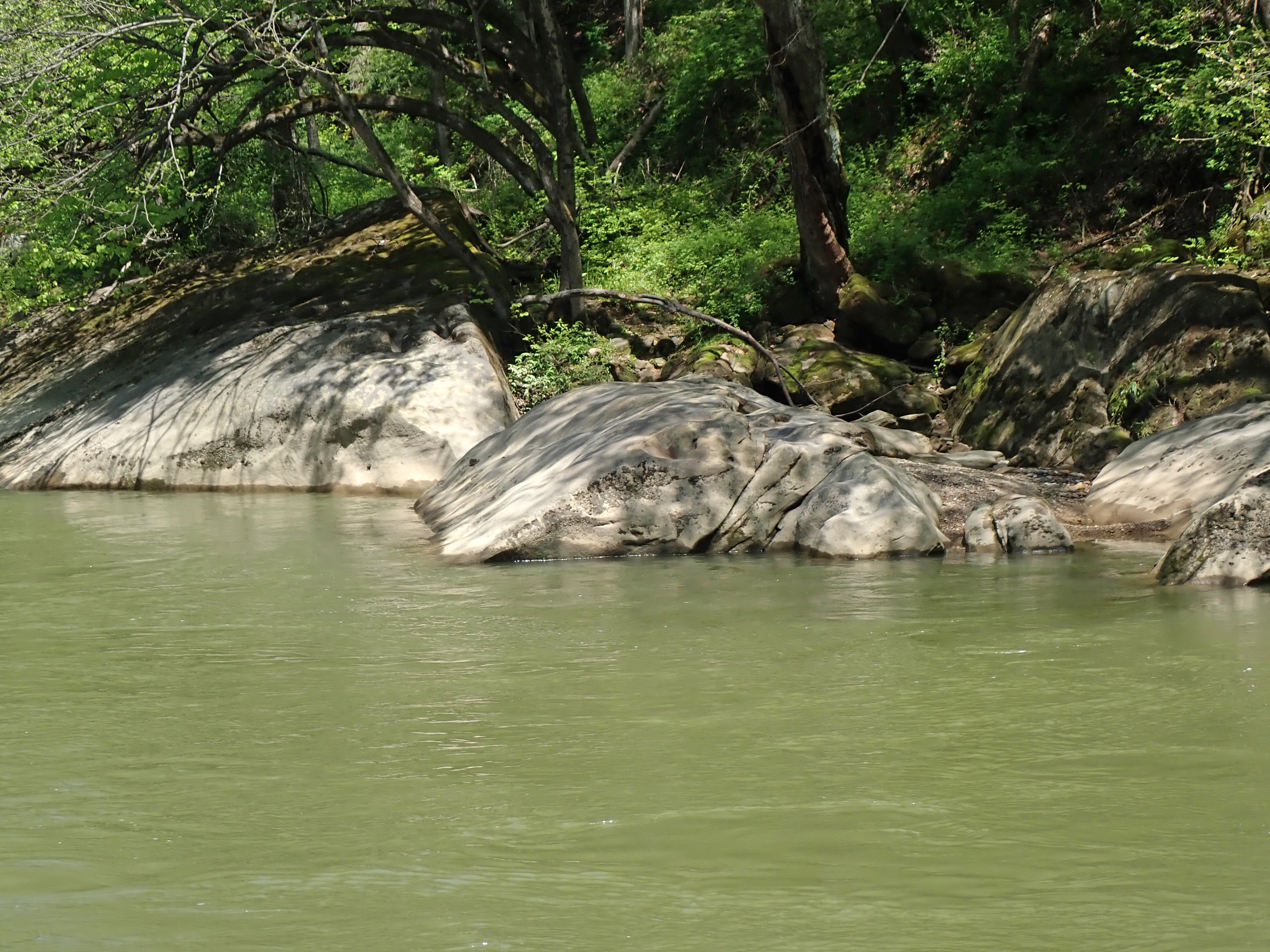

== See also ==
- List of rivers of Ohio
