= Howard Lake (Northwest Territories) =

Lake in the Northwest Territories, Canada

- Location within Northwest Territories

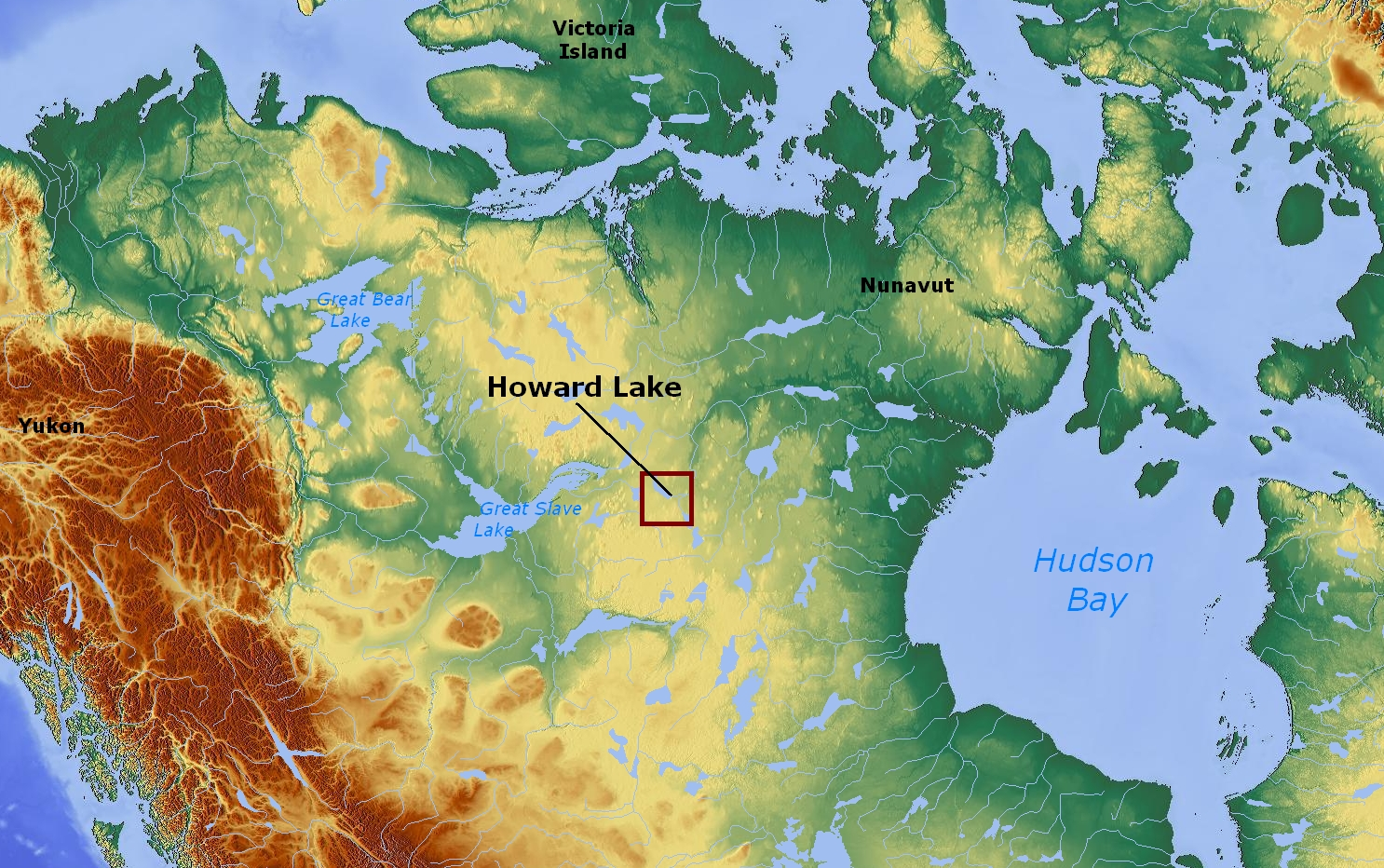
- Location: Northwest Territories
- Coordinates: 62°15′N 105°57′W
- Basin countries: Canada

Howard Lake is a lake in the Northwest Territories, Canada.

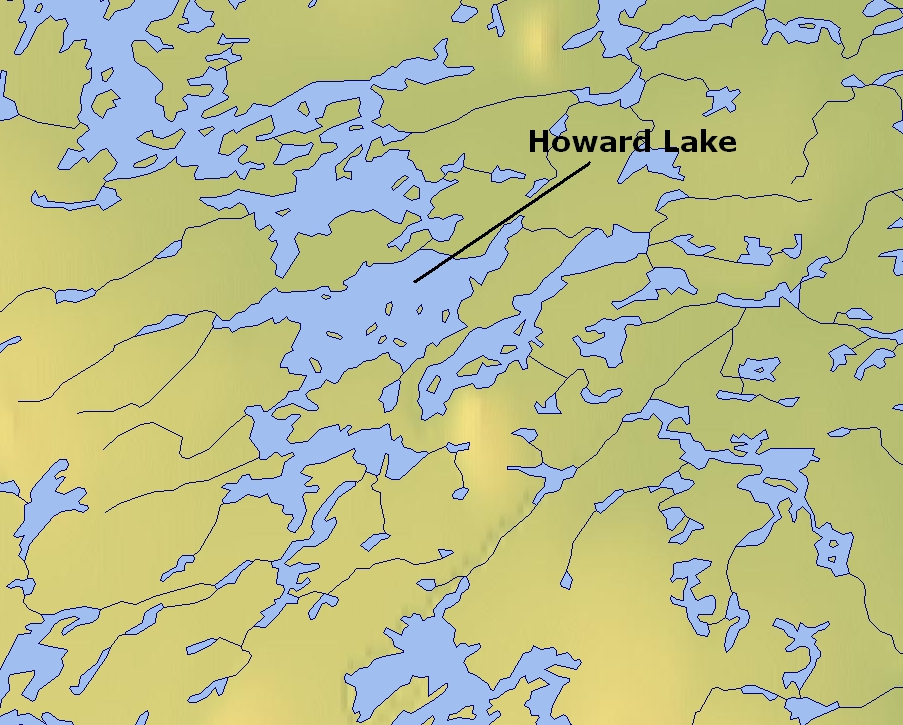
Map

== See also ==
- List of lakes in the Northwest Territories
