= Howard Lake, Minnesota =

City in Minnesota, United States

Howard Lake
- City
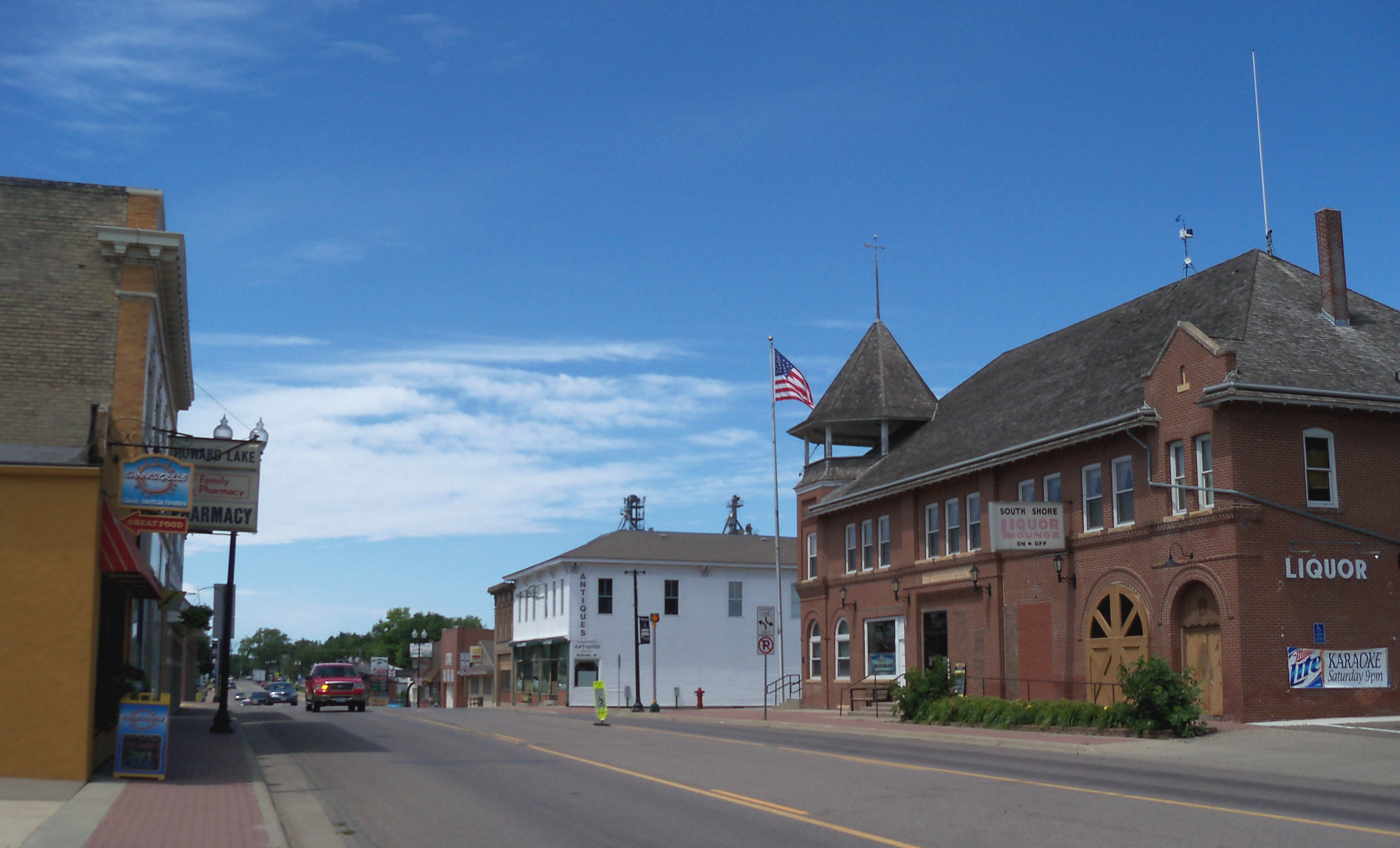
- Downtown Howard Lake
- Motto: "Home Of The Good Neighbor"
- Location of Howard Lake within Wright County, Minnesota
- Coordinates: 45°4′N 94°4′W
- Country: United States
- State: Minnesota
- County: Wright
- Established: 1855

Area
  - Total: 1.91 sq mi (4.94 km^{2})
  - Land: 1.85 sq mi (4.80 km^{2})
  - Water: 0.054 sq mi (0.14 km^{2})
- Elevation: 1,014 ft (309 m)

Population (2020)
  - Total: 2,071
  - Density: 1,118/sq mi (431.7/km^{2})
- Time zone: UTC-6 (Central (CST))
  - Summer (DST): UTC-5 (CDT)
- ZIP codes: 55349, 55575
- Area code: 320
- FIPS code: 27-30284
- GNIS feature ID: 0645261
- Website: www.howard-lake.mn.us

Howard Lake is a city in Wright County, Minnesota, United States. It hosts the annual Wright County fair. The population was 2,071 at the 2020 census.

== Geography ==
According to the United States Census Bureau, the city has an area of 2.05 square miles (5.31 km^{2}); 1.77 square miles (4.58 km^{2}) is land and 0.28 square miles (0.73 km^{2}) is water.

The town of Howard Lake sits on the south shore of Howard Lake. Other area lakes include Mallard Pass Lake, Lake Ann, Dutch Lake, and Smith Lake.

== Infrastructure ==
=== Transportation ===
U.S. Highway 12 serves as a main route in Howard Lake. Running parallel with Route 12 is a freight rail line.

== History ==
The area was first settled by the Dakota, then, in 1855, by Morgan V. Cochran, who sold his land to Charles Goodsell in 1863. Howard Lake developed as a railroad station.

Howard Lake was platted in 1869, and named after nearby Howard Lake. A post office was established under the name Howard in 1870; the post office was renamed Howard Lake in 1892 and remains in operation. One property in Howard Lake, the 1904 Howard Lake City Hall, is listed on the National Register of Historic Places.

== Demographics ==
Historical population
Census	Pop.	Note	%±
1880	477		—
1890	610		27.9%
1900	737		20.8%
1910	626		−15.1%
1920	744		18.8%
1930	768		3.2%
1940	847		10.3%
1950	931		9.9%
1960	1,007		8.2%
1970	1,162		15.4%
1980	1,240		6.7%
1990	1,343		8.3%
2000	1,853		38.0%
2010	1,962		5.9%
2020	2,071		5.6%
U.S. Decennial Census

=== 2020 census ===
As of the 2020 census, Howard Lake had a population of 2,071. The median age was 38.5 years. 23.4% of residents were under the age of 18 and 17.3% of residents were 65 years of age or older. For every 100 females there were 97.4 males, and for every 100 females age 18 and over there were 95.7 males age 18 and over.

0.0% of residents lived in urban areas, while 100.0% lived in rural areas.

There were 847 households in Howard Lake, of which 29.5% had children under the age of 18 living in them. Of all households, 46.4% were married-couple households, 18.5% were households with a male householder and no spouse or partner present, and 25.4% were households with a female householder and no spouse or partner present. About 28.8% of all households were made up of individuals and 12.9% had someone living alone who was 65 years of age or older.

There were 908 housing units, of which 6.7% were vacant. The homeowner vacancy rate was 1.6% and the rental vacancy rate was 9.2%.

Racial composition as of the 2020 census
Race	Number	Percent
White	1,927	93.0%
Black or African American	20	1.0%
American Indian and Alaska Native	10	0.5%
Asian	9	0.4%
Native Hawaiian and Other Pacific Islander	0	0.0%
Some other race	33	1.6%
Two or more races	72	3.5%
Hispanic or Latino (of any race)	71	3.4%

=== 2010 census ===
As of the census of 2010, there were 1,962 people, 786 households, and 518 families living in the city. The population density was 1,108.5 inhabitants per square mile (428.0/km^{2}). There were 865 housing units at an average density of 488.7 per square mile (188.7/km^{2}). The racial makeup of the city was 96.5% White, 0.6% African American, 0.3% Native American, 0.2% Asian, 0.1% Pacific Islander, 1.5% from other races, and 0.8% from two or more races. Hispanic or Latino of any race were 4.7% of the population.

There were 786 households, of which 35.9% had children under the age of 18 living with them, 50.5% were married couples living together, 10.1% had a female householder with no husband present, 5.3% had a male householder with no wife present, and 34.1% were non-families. 30.2% of all households were made up of individuals, and 10.2% had someone living alone who was 65 years of age or older. The average household size was 2.42 and the average family size was 2.98.

The median age in the city was 36.5 years. 27.1% of residents were under the age of 18; 6.6% were between the ages of 18 and 24; 29.5% were from 25 to 44; 22.2% were from 45 to 64; and 14.7% were 65 years of age or older. The gender makeup of the city was 48.0% male and 52.0% female.

=== 2000 census ===
As of the census of 2000, there were 1,853 people, 735 households, and 490 families living in the city. The population density was 1,405.2 inhabitants per square mile (542.6/km^{2}). There were 759 housing units at an average density of 575.6 per square mile (222.2/km^{2}). The racial makeup of the city was 98.27% White, 0.27% African American, 0.16% Native American, 0.38% Asian, 0.49% from other races, and 0.43% from two or more races. Hispanic or Latino of any race were 1.03% of the population. 52.1% were of German, 8.9% Norwegian, 7.3% Swedish and 5.8% American ancestry according to Census 2000.

There were 735 households, of which 34.1% had children under the age of 18 living with them, 51.7% were married couples living together, 10.6% had a female householder with no husband present, and 33.2% were non-families. 27.9% of all households were made up of individuals, and 12.4% had someone living alone who was 65 years of age or older. The average household size was 2.52 and the average family size was 3.10.

In the city, the population was spread out, with 28.4% under the age of 18, 9.0% from 18 to 24, 30.1% from 25 to 44, 18.6% from 45 to 64, and 13.9% who were 65 years of age or older. The median age was 33 years. For every 100 females, there were 91.0 males. For every 100 females age 18 and over, there were 89.6 males.

The median income for a household in the city was $38,015, and the median income for a family was $49,327. Males had a median income of $32,500 versus $25,040 for females. The per capita income for the city was $17,900. About 5.8% of families and 9.4% of the population were below the poverty line, including 13.0% of those under age 18 and 7.3% of those age 65 or over.

== Politics ==
Presidential election results

2020 Precinct Results Spreadsheet2016 Precinct Results Spreadsheet2012 Precinct Results Spreadsheet2008 Precinct Results Spreadsheet2004 Precinct Results Spreadsheet2000 Precinct Results Spreadsheet1996 Precinct Results1992 Precinct Results1988 Precinct Results1984 Precinct Results1980 Precinct Results1976 Precinct Results1968 Precinct Results1964 Precinct Results1960 Precinct Results
Year	Republican	Democratic	Third parties
2020	65.9% 802	30.8% 375	3.3% 40
2016	64.8% 614	26.1% 247	9.1% 86
2012	58.8% 570	37.5% 364	3.7% 36
2008	56.7% 554	39.9% 390	3.4% 33
2004	60.2% 621	37.5% 387	2.3% 23
2000	54.0% 442	35.9% 294	10.1% 83
1996	39.7% 288	45.7% 332	43.6% 106
1992	34.9% 225	38.6% 249	26.5% 171
1988	55.6% 321	44.4% 256	0.0% 0
1984	58.8% 357	41.2% 250	0.0% 0
1980	48.9% 292	42.2% 252	8.9% 53
1976	50.2% 311	49.0% 304	0.8% 5
1968	41.2% 220	55.4% 296	3.4% 18
1964	40.5% 202	59.3% 296	0.2% 1
1960	74.4% 390	25.4% 133	0.2% 1

== Economy ==
The Dura Supreme Cabinetry headquarters is in Howard Lake.

=== Principal employer ===
The city's principal employer is:

#	Employer	# of Employees
1	Dura Supreme Cabinetry	450

== Notable people ==
- Harold J. Dahl, Minnesota state legislator, judge, and lawyer, lived in Howard Lake
- Paul L. Eddy, Minnesota state legislator
- Tim Foecke, metallurgist, graduated from Howard Lake–Waverly High School in 1982
