= List of storms named Howard =

The name Howard has been used for seven tropical cyclones in the Eastern Pacific Ocean.

- Hurricane Howard (1980) – Category 2 hurricane that threatened southern California and Baja California, but never made landfall
- Tropical Storm Howard (1986) – minimal tropical storm that remained off the coast of Mexico
- Tropical Storm Howard (1992) – strong tropical storm that stayed out to sea
- Hurricane Howard (1998) – Category 4 hurricane that never threatened any land. Strongest storm of the annual season
- Hurricane Howard (2004) – another Category 4 hurricane that produced swells along the Baja California peninsula and southern California
- Tropical Storm Howard (2016) – tropical storm whose remnants caused flooding over Maui and Oahu
- Hurricane Howard (2022) – Category 1 hurricane that didn't affect any land
