= USS Howard =

USS Howard has been the name of more than one United States Navy ship, and may refer to:

- USS Howard (DD-179), a destroyer in commission from 1920 to 1922 and, as destroyer-minesweeper USS Howard (DMS-7), from 1940 to 1945
- USS Howard (DDG-83), a guided-missile destroyer in commission since 2001

See also

- USS Curtis W. Howard (DE-752)
