= Howard Lake (Cook County, Minnesota) =

Lake in the state of Minnesota, United States

- Location within Minnesota
- Location: Cook County, Minnesota
- Coordinates: 48°4′36″N 90°59′5″W
- Type: lake

Howard Lake is a lake in Cook County, Minnesota, in the United States.

Howard Lake was named for a local mining prospector.

== See also ==
- List of lakes in Minnesota
