= Howard Lake (Washington) =

Coon Lake
- Location within Washington (state)
- Location: Chelan County, Washington
- Coordinates: 48°23′19″N 120°50′00″W
- Type: lake
- Basin countries: United States
- Surface area: 15 acres (0.061 km^{2})
- Surface elevation: 2,185 ft (666 m)

Coon Lake, a 15 acres (0.061 km^{2}) lake, and its associated 3 miles (4.8 km) stream, Coon Creek, are located in the Stehekin River Valley in Washington State’s Cascade Mountain Range. They are both within the Lake Chelan National Recreation Area, a part of both the North Cascades National Park Complex and the Stephen Mather Wilderness. Howard Lake is located at Latitude +48.3886007 and Longitude -120.8334497.

The origin of the name of Coon lake is not known, but one explanation is that it is named after the Coon family, who used to work in the mines near the lake.

Beginning shortly after 1900, the local residents of the Stehekin Valley began calling the lake "Coon Lake," widely seen as a pejorative slur against Mr. Howard. The lake and creek retained the "Coon" names until the early 21st Century. In 2007, Washington State changed the names to "Howard Lake" and "Howard Creek," but the U.S. government, which administers the Lake Chelan National Recreation Area in which the lake and creek are located, refused to concur. For several years, state maps referred to the geographic features with the "Howard" name, while federal maps, trail signs and tourist information retained the "Coon" name. In 2015, following a concerted effort by citizens and elected officials, the federal government agreed to drop the "Coon" name and adopt "Howard."

== Controversy involving Howard Lake's name ==
In 2007, local citizens and other supporters petitioned the Washington State Board on Geographic Names to change the name of Coon Lake to Howard Lake, citing two basic reasons: (1) to honor the Black miner Wilson Howard, and (2) to remove a name that was widely seen as pejorative and even racist. The petition was supported by individuals along with the Eastern Washington State Historical Society, the Chelan County commissioners and the county sheriff. One long-term resident noted that "I have never seen raccoons in Stehekin nor heard of any being seen anywhere near the lake.".

The Lake Chelan Historical Society and several local individuals, along with the National Park Service, opposed the name change.

In May 2007 the Washington State Board on Geographic Names voted unanimously to change the name of the lake from Coon Lake to Howard Lake.

In May 2008 the state Board rejected a proposal from the National Park Service to give the lake a different name, and reaffirmed its decision to name the lake Howard Lake.

In October 2008, the state Board voted to change the name of the associated Coon Creek to Howard Creek.

In 2009, the U.S. Board on Geographic Names rejected the state’s decisions to rename Coon Lake and Creek.

State-federal disputes of this sort are highly unusual. For several years state officials referred to Howard Lake and Howard Creek, while federal officials retained the Coon name. Because the geographic features are in land administered by the National Park Service and visited by tourists, trail signs, maps and other information distributed by the Park Service retained the Coon name.

In 2015, Washington State media interest in the state-federal name dispute was rekindled after President Obama traveled to Alaska and announced the renaming of Mount McKinley – now called Denali. The first article appeared in the online magazine Crosscut.com, and several other media reports followed. More than 50 Washington State senators and representatives, led by State Senator Pramila Jayapal, called on the federal government to drop its opposition to the Howard name. The legislators asserted that "In continuing to oppose the name change, the Park Service is failing to recognize Mr. Howard’s historical contribution to the area and is perpetuating a geographic name that is widely seen as pejorative given its specific origin in this case." Local and national media coverage focused on the controversy. Sen. Jayapal, writing in a local newspaper, asserted that the National Park Service’s opposition was reinforcing the belief that parks were not welcoming to people of color, noting that just 22 percent of visitors to National Parks were minorities, yet almost 37 percent of America’s population is now minority.

In addition to the state legislators, Senator Patty Murray, Senator Maria Cantwell, Congressman Adam Smith, Congressman Dave Reichert, Washington Governor Jay Inslee, and the Regional Director of the National Parks Conservation Association also urged the federal government to accept the Howard name.

Following the public outcry, the National Park Service reversed course, stating that since it had "reexamined the historical records and uncovered previously overlooked evidence" it would now support the Howard Lake and Creek names.

On November 12, 2015, the U.S. Board on Geographic Names unanimously adopted the Howard Lake and Creek names, officially removing the name "Coon" after more than 100 years of usage.
