= Howard County =

Howard County is the name of seven counties in the United States of America:

- Howard County, Arkansas
- Howard County, Indiana
- Howard County, Iowa
- Howard County, Maryland
- Howard County, Missouri
- Howard County, Nebraska
- Howard County, Texas
