= Cavallo, Ohio =

Unincorporated community in Ohio, U.S.

Coordinates: 40°24′46″N 82°10′40″W

Cavallo is an unincorporated community in Coshocton County, in the U.S. state of Ohio.

== History ==
Cavallo was laid out in 1836 when the Walhonding Canal was extended to that point.
