= Howard, Chippewa County, Wisconsin =

Town of Howard
- Town
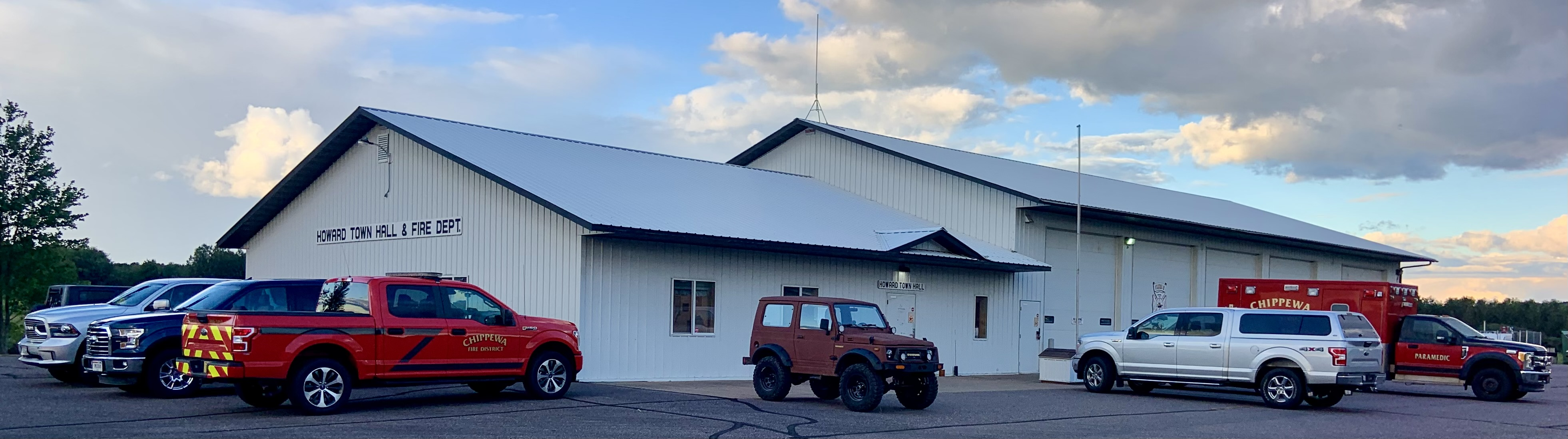
- Town hall

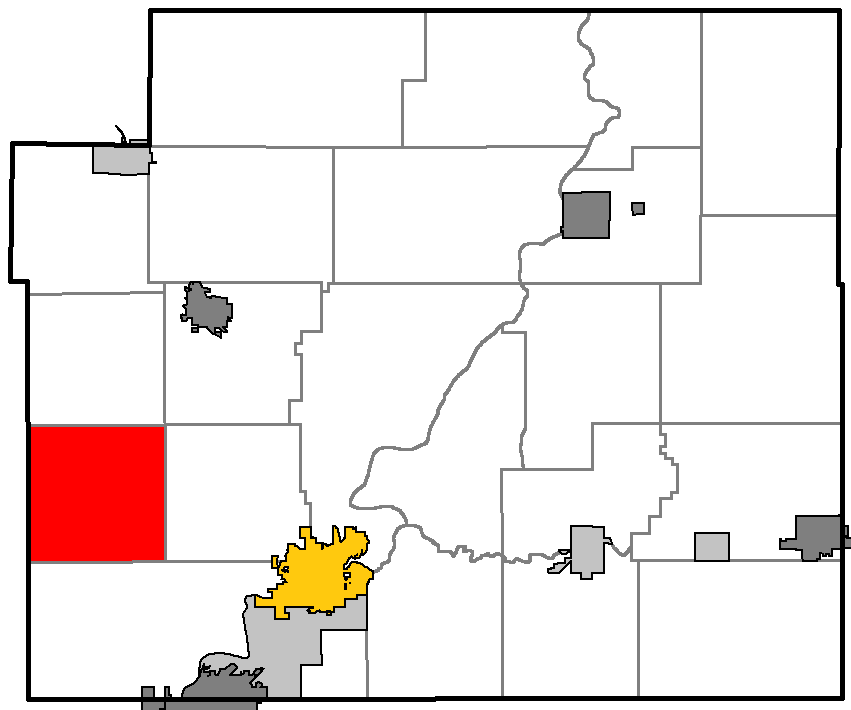
- Location of Howard within Chippewa County

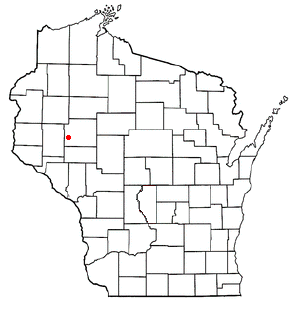
- Location of the Town of Howard
- Coordinates: 44°58′43″N 91°35′44″W
- Country: United States
- State: Wisconsin
- County: Chippewa

Area
  - Total: 35.8 sq mi (92.8 km^{2})
  - Land: 35.8 sq mi (92.8 km^{2})
  - Water: 0 sq mi (0.0 km^{2})
- Elevation: 1,132 ft (345 m)

Population (2020)
  - Total: 777
  - Density: 21.7/sq mi (8.37/km^{2})
- Time zone: UTC-6 (Central (CST))
  - Summer (DST): UTC-5 (CDT)
- Area codes: 715 & 534
- FIPS code: 55-36000
- GNIS feature ID: 1583413
- Website: howardchippewawi.gov

The Town of Howard is located in southwestern Chippewa County in the U.S. state of Wisconsin. The population was 777 at the 2020 census, down from 798 at the 2010 census. The unincorporated communities of Albertville and Howard are located in the town.

== History ==
The town was named for Brigadier General Benjamin Howard, an officer in the War of 1812.

== Geography ==
The town is bordered to the west by Dunn County, on the north by the Town of Cooks Valley, on the east by the Town of Tilden, and on the south by the Town of Wheaton. According to the United States Census Bureau, the town has a total area of 35.8 square miles (92.8 km^{2}), all land.

== Demographics ==
Historical population
Census	Pop.	Note	%±
1990	625		—
2000	648		3.7%
2010	798		23.1%
2020	777		−2.6%

As of the census of 2000, there were 648 people, 235 households, and 187 families residing in the town. The population density was 18.1 people per square mile (7.0/km^{2}). There were 237 housing units at an average density of 6.6 per square mile (2.6/km^{2}). The racial makeup of the town was 99.07% White, 0.62% Asian, 0.15% from other races, and 0.15% from two or more races. Hispanic or Latino of any race were 0.15% of the population.

There were 235 households, out of which 35.7% had children under the age of 18 living with them, 66.4% were married couples living together, 7.2% had a female householder with no husband present, and 20.4% were non-families. 15.3% of all households were made up of individuals, and 6.4% had someone living alone who was 65 years of age or older. The average household size was 2.76 and the average family size was 3.10.

The population was 27.2% under the age of 18, 9.0% from 18 to 24, 31.2% from 25 to 44, 22.7% from 45 to 64, and 10.0% who were 65 years of age or older. The median age was 36 years. For every 100 females, there were 111 males. For every 100 females age 18 and over, there were 109 males.

The median income for a household in the town was $42,109, and the median income for a family was $44,125. Males had a median income of $30,682 versus $21,667 for females. The per capita income for the town was $15,274. About 3.6% of families and 8.2% of the population were below the poverty line, including 13.4% of those under age 18 and 13.6% of those age 65 or over.
