= Howard, Ohio =

- Census-designated place
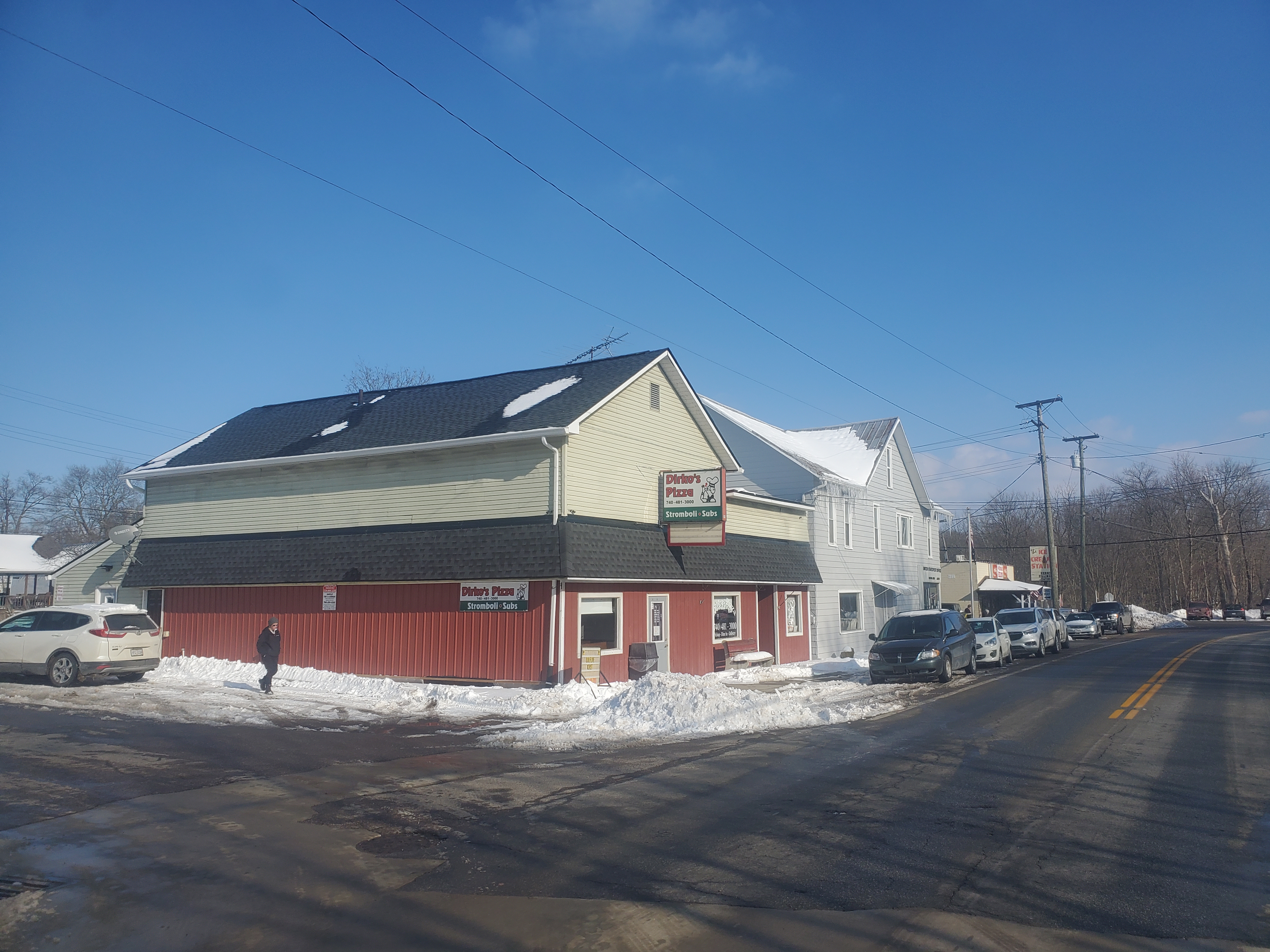
- Howard, Ohio in 2022

- Location within Ohio Location within the United States
- Coordinates: 40°24′28″N 82°19′37″W
- Country: United States
- State: Ohio
- County: Knox
- Townships: Howard

Area
  - Total: 0.22 sq mi (0.58 km^{2})
  - Land: 0.22 sq mi (0.58 km^{2})
  - Water: 0 sq mi (0.00 km^{2})
- Elevation: 910 ft (280 m)

Population (2020)
  - Total: 246
  - Density: 1,099.1/sq mi (424.38/km^{2})
- Time zone: UTC-5 (Eastern (EST))
  - Summer (DST): UTC-4 (EDT)
- ZIP code: 43028
- Area code: 740
- FIPS code: 39-36512
- GNIS feature ID: 2628904

Howard is a census-designated place (CDP) in southern Howard Township, Knox County, Ohio, United States. As of the 2020 census it had a population of 246. The United States Postal Service has assigned Howard the ZIP Code 43028. The community lies along U.S. Route 36.

== History ==
Originally called "Kinderhook", the community adopted the name "Howard" when the railroad was extended to that point. A post office called Howard has been in operation since 1872.

East Knox High School is located in Howard, as are the East Knox Local School District board offices. The Kokosing Gap Trail runs through Howard, Ohio.

== Demographics ==
Historical population
Census	Pop.	Note	%±
2020	246		—
U.S. Decennial Census
