= Howard Lake (central Mendocino County) =

Lake in the state of California, United States

- Location within California Location within the United States
- Location: Mendocino County, California
- Coordinates: 39°40′51″N 123°17′45″W
- Type: Lake
- Basin countries: United States
- Surface elevation: 2,992 ft (912 m)

Howard Lake is a lake in the U.S. state of California. The elevation of the lake is 2992 feet.
