= Walhonding River =

Coordinates: 40.3753°N 81.6737°W

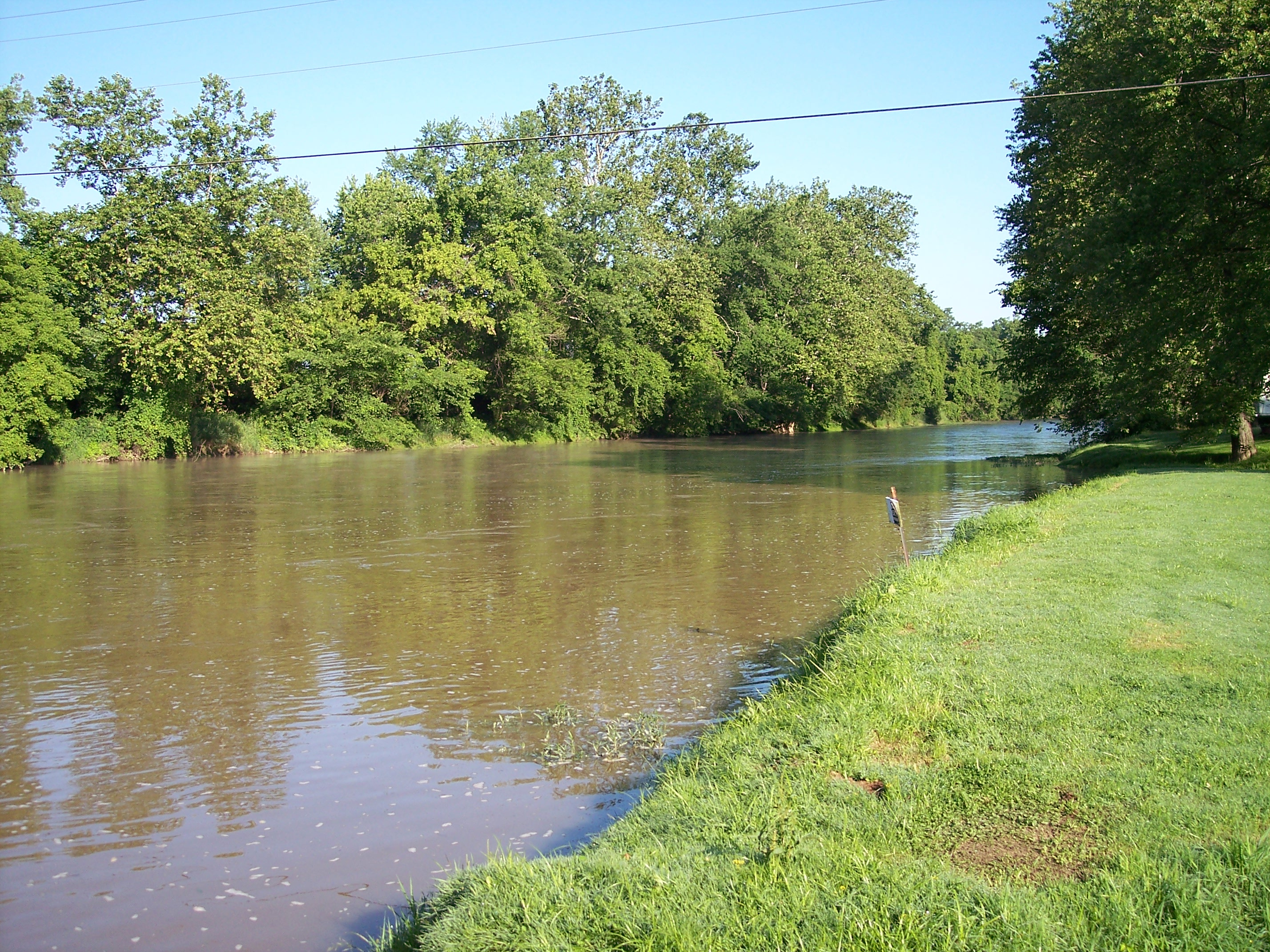
- The Walhonding River in Warsaw in 2006

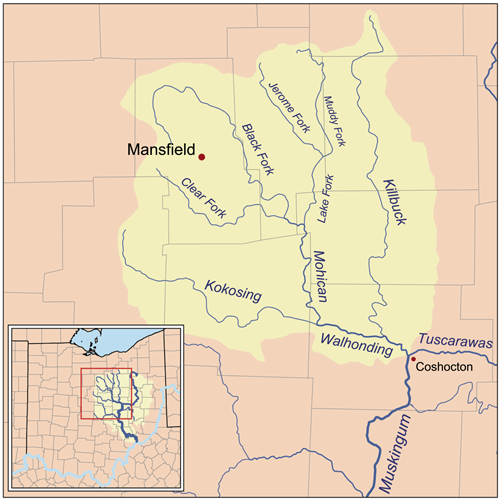
- Map of the Walhonding River and its tributaries

Location
- Country: United States
- State: Ohio
- County: Coshocton County

Physical characteristics
- Source: Confluence of Kokosing River and Mohican River
  - location: Coshocton County
- Mouth: Muskingum River
  - location: Coshocton
- Length: 23.5 mi (37.8 km)
- Basin size: 2,252 sq mi (5,830 km^{2})
- Discharge
  - location: Mohawk Dam at Nellie
  - average: 1,653.7 cu ft/s (46.83 m^{3}/s), USGS water years 1985-1991
- Discharge
  - location: mouth
  - average: 2,488.65 cu ft/s (70.471 m^{3}/s) (estimate)

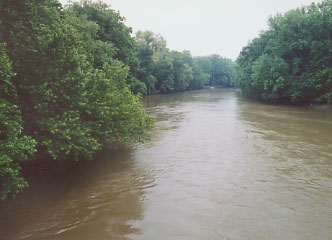
The Walhonding River at Coshocton in 2004

The Walhonding River is a principal tributary of the Muskingum River, 23.5 miles (37.8 km) long, in east-central Ohio in the United States. Via the Muskingum and Ohio Rivers, it is part of the watershed of the Mississippi River. It drains an area of 2,252 square miles (5,830 km^{2}).

The Walhonding flows for its entire length in Coshocton County. It is formed by the confluence of the Mohican River and the Kokosing River and flows generally east-southeast, passing through Mohawk Dam, which was built in the 1930s by the U.S. Army Corps of Engineers for the purpose of flood control in the Muskingum River watershed, and through the towns of Nellie and Warsaw. Downstream of Warsaw it collects Killbuck Creek. It meets the Tuscarawas River at the city of Coshocton to form the Muskingum River.

== Variant names ==
According to the Geographic Names Information System, the Walhonding River has also been known historically as:

- Muskingum River ("West branch")
- Walhandink River
- West Branch of the Muskingum
- White Woman Creek
- White Woman River
- White Womans Creek
- White Womans River
- Whitemans Creek
- Whitewoman Creek
- Whitewomans Creek
- Wolhonding River

The name "White Womans Creek" (and variants) was probably originally intended to refer specifically either to the Kokosing River or to the Mohican River; and during that same period (mid-1700s), the Walhonding was known only as the "West branch of the Muskingum". The final name "Walhonding" was newly chosen by legislators sometime after the 1820s.

== See also ==
- List of rivers of Ohio
