= Howard Lake (Wright County, Minnesota) =

Lake in the state of Minnesota, United States

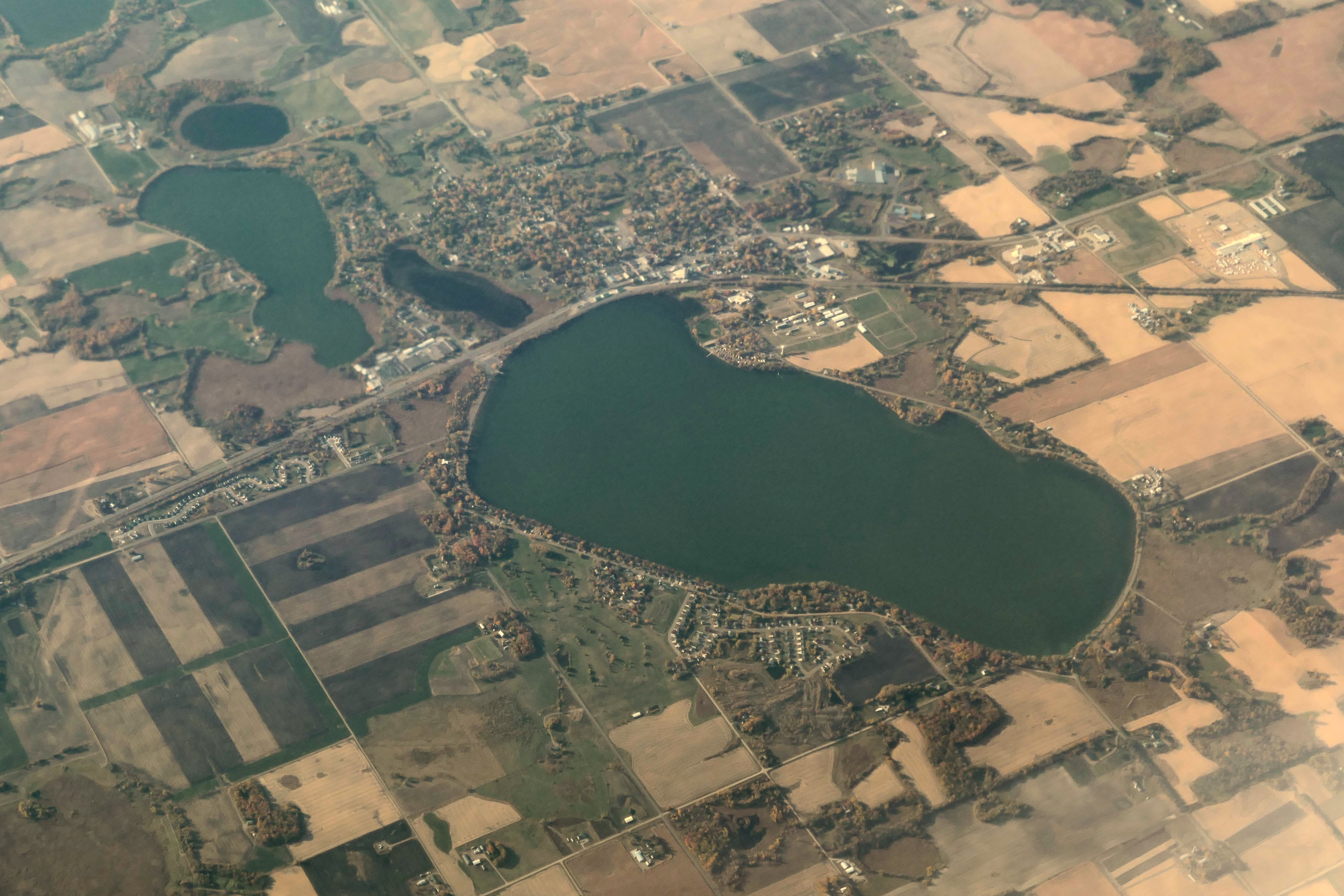

- Location within Minnesota
- Location: Wright County, Minnesota
- Coordinates: 45°4′20″N 94°4′10″W
- Type: lake

Howard Lake is a lake in Wright County, in the U.S. state of Minnesota.

Howard Lake was named for John Howard (prison reformer) (1726–1790), an English prison reformer of the 18th century.

== See also ==
- List of lakes in Minnesota
