= Seneca County, Ohio =

County in Ohio, United States

- County
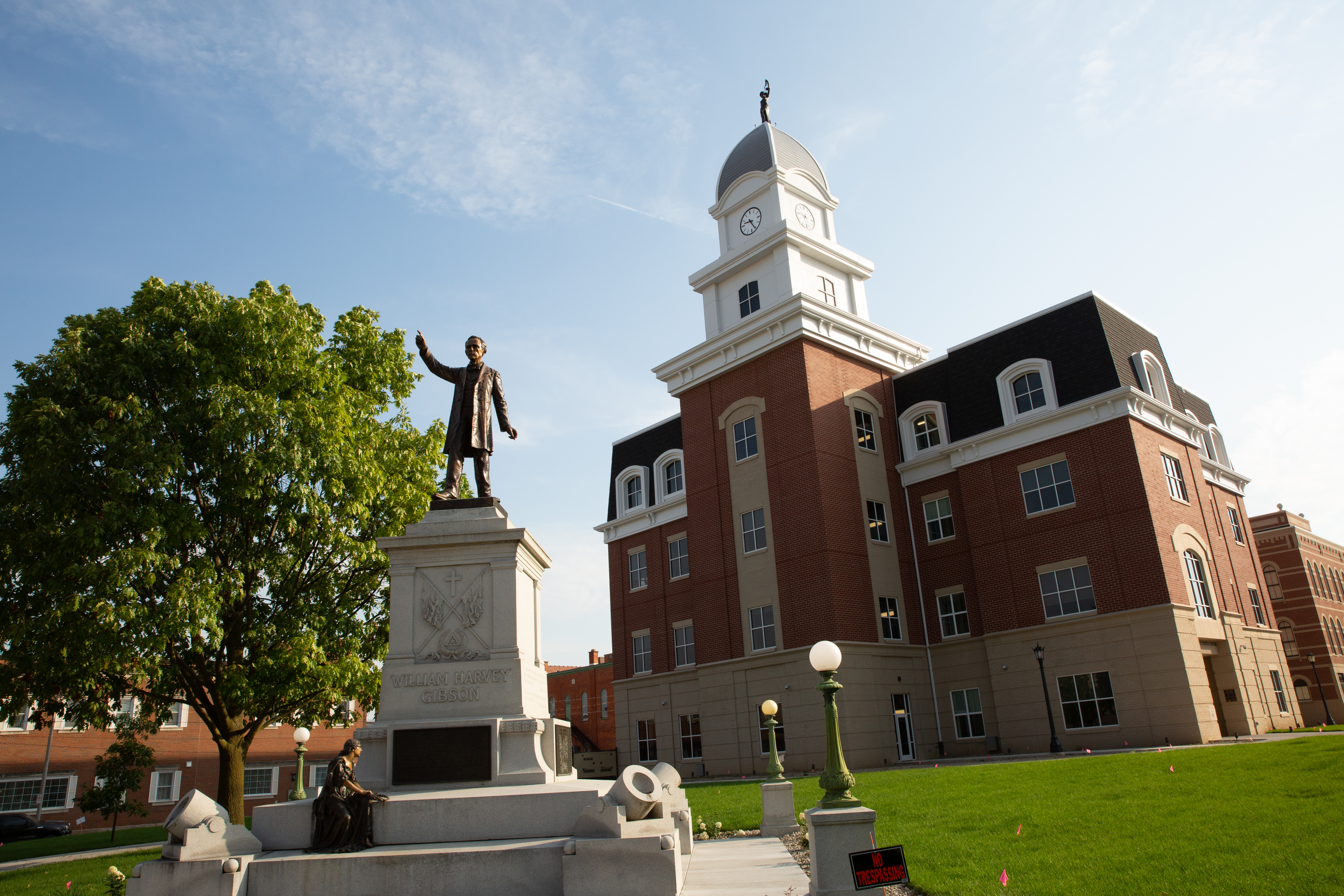
- Seneca County Justice Center in Tiffin, Ohio

- Flag Seal

- Location within the U.S. state of Ohio
- Coordinates: 41°08′N 83°08′W
- Country: United States
- State: Ohio
- Founded: April 1, 1824
- Named for: the Seneca nation
- Seat: Tiffin
- Largest city: Tiffin

Area
  - Total: 553 sq mi (1,430 km^{2})
  - Land: 551 sq mi (1,430 km^{2})
  - Water: 1.8 sq mi (4.7 km^{2}) 0.3%

Population (2020)
  - Total: 55,069
  - Estimate (2025): 54,522 ▼
  - Density: 100/sq mi (39/km^{2})
- Time zone: UTC−5 (Eastern)
  - Summer (DST): UTC−4 (EDT)
- Congressional district: 5th
- Website: senecacountyohio.gov

Seneca County is a county located in the northwestern part of the U.S. state of Ohio. As of the 2020 census, the population was 55,069. Its county seat is Tiffin. The county was created in 1820 and organized in 1824. It is named for the Seneca Indians, the westernmost nation of the Iroquois Confederacy. This people were based in present-day New York but had territory extending into Pennsylvania and Ohio. Seneca County comprises the Tiffin, OH Micropolitan Statistical Area, which is also included in the Findlay–Tiffin, OH Combined Statistical Area.

== History ==
This area was long occupied by a succession of indigenous peoples. During and after the colonial period, French, British and American fur traders established relations with the historic peoples of the time.

The county was barely inhabited by European Americans until the 1830s, but this period was one of steady migration by settlers from New York and New England. The migration was stimulated by completion of the Erie Canal through New York, which connected the markets by the Great Lakes to the Hudson River and New York City. By 1860 the population of Seneca County had increased to about half the current number of residents. It was developed for agriculture, and grew slowly thereafter. In 1889 900 Luxembourgers settled in Seneca County where they built substantial churches and schools.

Toward the end of the 19th century, during the Great Depression, and the post–World War II baby boom, this area had periods of greater population increase. In 1980 the census recorded a population of 61,901; the total has since declined. Since about 2000, the county's population declines by about 100–300 persons annually, mainly due to a migration deficit of about 300 persons annually. This decline is projected to continue in the future.

== Geography ==
According to the U.S. Census Bureau, the county has a total area of 553 square miles (1,430 km^{2}), of which 551 square miles (1,430 km^{2}) is land and 1.8 square miles (4.7 km^{2}) (0.3%) is water.

Almost 80% of the county's total area is agricultural land. Some 10% is covered by forest. Most of the rest is developed, with some allocated for pastureland.

The terrain of Seneca County is nearly level, gently sloping from about 290 meters ASL in the southeast to about 210 m ASL at the edge of the Great Black Swamp in the northwest. Most of the county's area is located between 230 and 260 m ASL, however. Almost the entire county belongs to the Sandusky River drainage basin; the river bisects the county from north to south slightly west of its middle. Tiffin developed on both sides of the river, which flows north to its mouth at Lake Erie. There is some steeper terrain along the river's course, formed by the occasional ravine of its tributaries.

The Great Lakes moderate temperatures somewhat, but Seneca County has essentially a continental climate. After most of the forests were cleared for agricultural development, the microclimate was disrupted. Winters can be harsh, with plentiful snowfall due to lake-effect snow. Summers are often hot and oppressively humid, bordering on subtropical. The mostly featureless surface does not form any obstacles to the winter winds sweeping south from Canada, resulting in extreme wind chill at times. In a 1906 description, the local climate was described as "rather unhealthful".

=== Adjacent counties ===
- Sandusky County (north)
- Huron County (east)
- Crawford County (southeast)
- Wyandot County (southwest)
- Hancock County (west)
- Wood County (northwest)

== Demographics ==
Historical population
Census	Pop.	Note	%±
1830	5,159		—
1840	18,128		251.4%
1850	27,104		49.5%
1860	30,868		13.9%
1870	30,827		−0.1%
1880	36,947		19.9%
1890	40,869		10.6%
1900	41,163		0.7%
1910	42,421		3.1%
1920	43,176		1.8%
1930	47,941		11.0%
1940	48,499		1.2%
1950	52,978		9.2%
1960	59,326		12.0%
1970	60,696		2.3%
1980	61,901		2.0%
1990	59,733		−3.5%
2000	58,683		−1.8%
2010	56,745		−3.3%
2020	55,069		−3.0%
2025 (est.)	54,522	▼	−1.0%
U.S. Decennial Census; 1790-1960 1900-1990; 1990-2000 2020

=== 2020 census ===
As of the 2020 census, the county had a population of 55,069, and the median age was 40.6 years. 21.9% of residents were under the age of 18 and 19.1% of residents were 65 years of age or older. For every 100 females there were 100.2 males, and for every 100 females age 18 and over there were 98.5 males.

The racial makeup of the county was 89.6% White, 2.5% Black or African American, 0.2% American Indian and Alaska Native, 0.7% Asian, 0.1% Native Hawaiian and Pacific Islander, 1.6% from some other race, and 5.3% from two or more races. Hispanic or Latino residents of any race comprised 5.3% of the population.

54.4% of residents lived in urban areas, while 45.6% lived in rural areas.

There were 22,017 households in the county, of which 28.2% had children under the age of 18 living in them. Of all households, 47.2% were married-couple households, 19.5% were households with a male householder and no spouse or partner present, and 24.7% were households with a female householder and no spouse or partner present. About 29.3% of all households were made up of individuals and 13.3% had someone living alone who was 65 years of age or older. There were 23,934 housing units, of which 8.0% were vacant. Among occupied housing units, 71.7% were owner-occupied and 28.3% were renter-occupied. The homeowner vacancy rate was 1.3% and the rental vacancy rate was 7.2%.

=== Racial and ethnic composition ===
Seneca County, Ohio – Racial and ethnic composition Note: the US Census treats Hispanic/Latino as an ethnic category. This table excludes Latinos from the racial categories and assigns them to a separate category. Hispanics/Latinos may be of any race.
Race / Ethnicity (NH = Non-Hispanic)	Pop 1980	Pop 1990	Pop 2000	Pop 2010	Pop 2020	% 1980	% 1990	% 2000	% 2010	% 2020
White alone (NH)	59,093	56,574	54,821	51,739	48,213	95.46%	94.71%	93.42%	91.18%	87.55%
Black or African American alone (NH)	1,151	1,143	1,016	1,227	1,314	1.86%	1.91%	1.73%	2.16%	2.39%
Native American or Alaska Native alone (NH)	42	78	79	84	66	0.07%	0.13%	0.13%	0.15%	0.12%
Asian alone (NH)	137	228	218	321	359	0.22%	0.38%	0.37%	0.57%	0.65%
Native Hawaiian or Pacific Islander alone (NH)	x	x	4	6	36	x	x	0.01%	0.01%	0.07%
Other race alone (NH)	75	34	41	51	158	0.12%	0.06%	0.07%	0.09%	0.29%
Mixed race or Multiracial (NH)	x	x	532	793	2,024	x	x	0.91%	1.40%	3.68%
Hispanic or Latino (any race)	1,403	1,676	1,972	2,524	2,899	2.27%	2.81%	3.36%	4.45%	5.26%
Total	61,901	59,733	58,683	56,745	55,069	100.00%	100.00%	100.00%	100.00%	100.00%

=== 2010 census ===
As of the 2010 United States census, there were 56,745 people, 21,774 households, and 14,870 families residing in the county. The population density was 103.0 inhabitants per square mile (39.8/km^{2}). There were 24,122 housing units at an average density of 43.8 units per square mile (16.9 units/km^{2}). The racial makeup of the county was 93.7% white, 2.3% black or African American, 0.6% Asian, 0.2% American Indian, 1.3% from other races, and 1.9% from two or more races. Those of Hispanic or Latino origin made up 4.4% of the population. In terms of ancestry, 47.6% were German, 10.4% were Irish, 8.9% were American, and 8.2% were English.

Of the 21,774 households, 31.4% had children under the age of 18 living with them, 51.6% were married couples living together, 11.3% had a female householder with no husband present, 31.7% were non-families, and 26.3% of all households were made up of individuals. The average household size was 2.49 and the average family size was 2.97. The median age was 38.8 years.

The median income for a household in the county was $42,573 and the median income for a family was $51,216. Males had a median income of $39,494 versus $30,286 for females. The per capita income for the county was $20,976. About 8.7% of families and 11.9% of the population were below the poverty line, including 17.9% of those under age 18 and 8.3% of those age 65 or over.

=== 2000 census ===
As of the census of 2000, there were 58,683 people, 22,292 households, and 15,738 families residing in the county. The population density was 107 inhabitants per square mile (41/km^{2}). There were 23,692 housing units at an average density of 43 units per square mile (17/km^{2}). The racial makeup of the county was 95.04% White, 1.76% Black or African American, 0.18% Native American, 0.38% Asian, 0.01% Pacific Islander, 1.39% from other races, and 1.25% from two or more races. 3.36% of the population were Hispanic or Latino of any race.

There were 22,292 households, out of which 33.40% had children under the age of 18 living with them, 56.10% were married couples living together, 10.20% had a female householder with no husband present, and 29.40% were non-families. 24.70% of all households were made up of individuals, and 10.60% had someone living alone who was 65 years of age or older. The average household size was 2.56 and the average family size was 3.04.

In the county, the population was spread out, with 26.00% under the age of 18, 10.40% from 18 to 24, 27.20% from 25 to 44, 22.40% from 45 to 64, and 14.10% who were 65 years of age or older. The median age was 36 years. For every 100 females there were 98.00 males. For every 100 females age 18 and over, there were 95.70 males.

The median income for a household in the county was $38,037, and the median income for a family was $44,600. Males had a median income of $32,387 versus $22,383 for females. The per capita income for the county was $17,027. About 6.10% of families and 9.00% of the population were below the poverty line, including 9.60% of those under age 18 and 7.20% of those age 65 or over.

== Politics ==
Prior to 1936, Seneca County had supported Democrats in presidential elections, supporting Republican candidates only four times from 1856 to 1932. But starting with the 1936 election, it has become a Republican stronghold in presidential elections. Its support for Democrats Lyndon B. Johnson in 1964 and Bill Clinton in 1996 were the exceptions.

United States presidential election results for Seneca County, Ohio
Year	Republican		Democratic		Third party(ies)	
Year	No.	%	No.	%	No.	%
1856	2,565	48.64%	2,605	49.40%	103	1.95%
1860	3,052	48.14%	3,175	50.08%	113	1.78%
1864	3,042	48.08%	3,285	51.92%	0	0.00%
1868	2,977	45.68%	3,540	54.32%	0	0.00%
1872	3,128	47.12%	3,462	52.15%	48	0.72%
1876	3,793	45.57%	4,515	54.25%	15	0.18%
1880	4,008	44.61%	4,845	53.92%	132	1.47%
1884	4,004	43.72%	4,950	54.05%	205	2.24%
1888	4,165	43.08%	5,232	54.12%	271	2.80%
1892	4,195	41.49%	5,378	53.19%	537	5.31%
1896	4,988	43.51%	6,347	55.36%	130	1.13%
1900	4,904	44.22%	5,946	53.62%	240	2.16%
1904	5,291	50.78%	4,757	45.65%	372	3.57%
1908	4,959	43.08%	6,138	53.32%	415	3.60%
1912	2,362	23.07%	5,082	49.63%	2,796	27.30%
1916	4,301	38.54%	6,451	57.80%	409	3.66%
1920	10,064	54.40%	8,175	44.19%	261	1.41%
1924	9,641	53.29%	6,290	34.77%	2,160	11.94%
1928	13,369	61.93%	8,136	37.69%	82	0.38%
1932	9,007	42.32%	11,894	55.88%	383	1.80%
1936	9,953	44.71%	8,982	40.35%	3,324	14.93%
1940	16,272	68.55%	7,464	31.45%	0	0.00%
1944	15,137	70.86%	6,224	29.14%	0	0.00%
1948	11,493	58.87%	7,954	40.74%	77	0.39%
1952	17,750	71.54%	7,060	28.46%	0	0.00%
1956	17,728	73.90%	6,260	26.10%	0	0.00%
1960	15,772	61.20%	10,001	38.80%	0	0.00%
1964	9,536	39.64%	14,518	60.36%	0	0.00%
1968	12,040	52.30%	8,970	38.97%	2,010	8.73%
1972	13,939	60.82%	8,180	35.69%	799	3.49%
1976	11,730	52.10%	10,074	44.74%	712	3.16%
1980	14,172	60.93%	7,303	31.40%	1,784	7.67%
1984	16,520	67.04%	7,905	32.08%	217	0.88%
1988	13,704	58.49%	9,504	40.56%	222	0.95%
1992	9,763	37.33%	9,280	35.49%	7,107	27.18%
1996	9,713	41.31%	10,044	42.72%	3,754	15.97%
2000	13,863	56.93%	9,512	39.06%	976	4.01%
2004	15,886	58.86%	10,957	40.60%	148	0.55%
2008	13,823	50.17%	13,087	47.50%	643	2.33%
2012	13,243	52.26%	11,353	44.80%	747	2.95%
2016	14,825	61.30%	7,404	30.62%	1,954	8.08%
2020	17,086	66.10%	8,266	31.98%	496	1.92%
2024	17,241	67.87%	7,765	30.57%	398	1.57%

United States Senate election results for Seneca County, Ohio1
Year	Republican		Democratic		Third party(ies)	
Year	No.	%	No.	%	No.	%
2024	15,420	61.45%	8,509	33.91%	1,163	4.63%

== Government and politics ==
=== County officials ===
Office	Name	Party
Commissioner	Tony Paradiso	Republican
Commissioner	William 'Bill' Frankart-President	Republican
Commissioner	Brent Busdeker-Vice President	Republican
Prosecutor	Derek W. DeVine	Independent
Sheriff	Fredrick W. Stevens	Republican
Clerk of Courts	Stephanie Hicks	Republican
Recorder	Michael Dell	Republican
Treasurer	Annette Everhart	Republican
Engineer	Mark Zimmerman	Republican
Coroner	Zachary K. West, DO	Republican
Auditor	Julie Adkins	Republican
Common Pleas Court Judge	Steve Shuff	Republican
Common Pleas Court Judge	Damon Alt	Republican
Juvenile Court Judge	Jay A. Meyer	Republican

== Transportation ==
=== Airports ===
The Seneca County Airport is located two nautical miles (2.3 mi; 3.7 km) southwest of Tiffin's central business district.

- Bandit Field Airdrome
- Fostoria Metropolitan Airport
- Weiker Airport

=== Major highways ===
- U.S. Route 23
- U.S. Route 224

=== Other highways ===
- State Route 4
- State Route 12
- State Route 18
- State Route 19
- State Route 53
- State Route 67
- State Route 100
- State Route 101
- State Route 162
- State Route 228
- State Route 231
- State Route 587
- State Route 590
- State Route 635
- State Route 778

== Communities ==
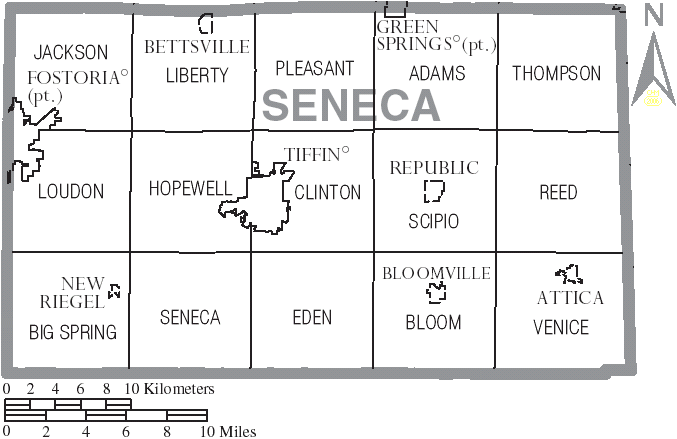
Map of Seneca County, Ohio With Municipal and Township Labels

=== Cities ===
- Bellevue (partly)
- Fostoria (partly)
- Tiffin (county seat)

=== Villages ===
- Attica
- Bettsville
- Bloomville
- Green Springs (partly)
- New Riegel
- Republic

=== Townships ===
- Adams
- Big Spring
- Bloom
- Clinton
- Eden
- Hopewell
- Jackson
- Liberty
- Loudon
- Pleasant
- Reed
- Scipio
- Seneca
- Thompson
- Venice

=== Census-designated places ===
- Bascom
- Flat Rock
- Fort Seneca
- Kansas
- McCutchenville
- Melmore
- Old Fort

=== Unincorporated communities ===
- Adrian
- Alvada
- Amsden
- Angus
- Berwick
- Caroline
- Carrothers
- Cooper
- Cromers
- Fireside
- Frenchtown
- Iler
- Lowell
- Maple Grove
- Omar
- Reedtown
- Rehoboth
- Rockaway
- Saint Stephens
- Siam
- Springville
- Swander
- Watson
- West Lodi

== Places of interest ==
- Seneca Caverns

== Natural history ==
Before widespread settlement, the area of Seneca County was for the most part woodland. Besides the fringe of the Great Black Swamp in the northwest, there was also an extensive area of marshland in the Bloomville area as well as smaller patches of swamp terrain which were formed due to the county's essentially level terrain. Native American inhabitants and later settlers used the region mainly for hunting fur animals, with little agriculture of note until the early 19th century.

Starting in the early-mid 19th century, the county's area was subject to wholesale deforestation. This led to massive alteration of much of the local wildlife, with grassland and farmland animals replacing the native woodland fauna. Migrant waterbirds, in ancient times commonly encountered throughout the region as they foraged in the swamps on their way south, are nowadays rare and concentrate on the few remaining waterbodies large enough to sustain them. The passenger pigeon (Ectopistes migratorius) had several roosting (and probably nesting) places in the county when it was still wooded. Removal of the forest had driven the birds away by the 1860s, foreshadowing its eventual total extinction due to large-scale logging which rendered this species unable to sustain the massive hunting pressure.

Several species of waterbirds, formerly frequently encountered during migration, are only rarely seen nowadays. These include, for example, the common loon (Gavia immer), American wigeon (Anas americana), redhead (Aythya americana), canvasback (Aythya valisneria), and several species of mergansers.

Landbirds were apparently less seriously affected; apart from the passenger pigeon, the ruffed grouse (Bonasa umbellus), wild turkey (Meleagris gallopavo), golden eagle (Aquila chrysaetos) and marsh wren (Cistothorus palustris) had essentially or completely disappeared by 1900. However, it is not known how many of the numerous species of New World warblers, most of which today only occur only as transient migrants, formerly bred in Seneca County.

The Eskimo curlew (Numenius borealis), possibly extinct today, occurred as a transient in Ohio until about 1900; to what extent it migrated through Seneca County is not well known but even if it did it is unlikely that it was often seen after deforestation had gotten underway in earnest. The extinct Carolina parakeet (Conuropsis carolinensis) – or probably individuals of the western subspecies, the Louisiana Parakeet (C. c. ludovicianus) – may have on occasion have occurred in Seneca County as a vagrant before 1862.

The only record of the long-billed murrelet (Brachyramphus perdix) in Ohio comes from Seneca County. A stray individual of this North Pacific auk was observed and photographed between November 12–18, 1996. The rare Kirtland's warbler (Setophaga kirtlandii) is again increasing in numbers and may occasionally range as far north as Seneca County.

The introduced house sparrow (Passer domesticus) is common since at least the late 19th century. The ring-necked pheasant (Phasianus colchicus), another species introduced from Europe, never seems to have become really plentiful, though it has been a breeding resident since at least 1901.

== See also ==
- National Register of Historic Places listings in Seneca County, Ohio
