= Liberty Township, Seneca County, Ohio =

Township in Ohio, US

- Township
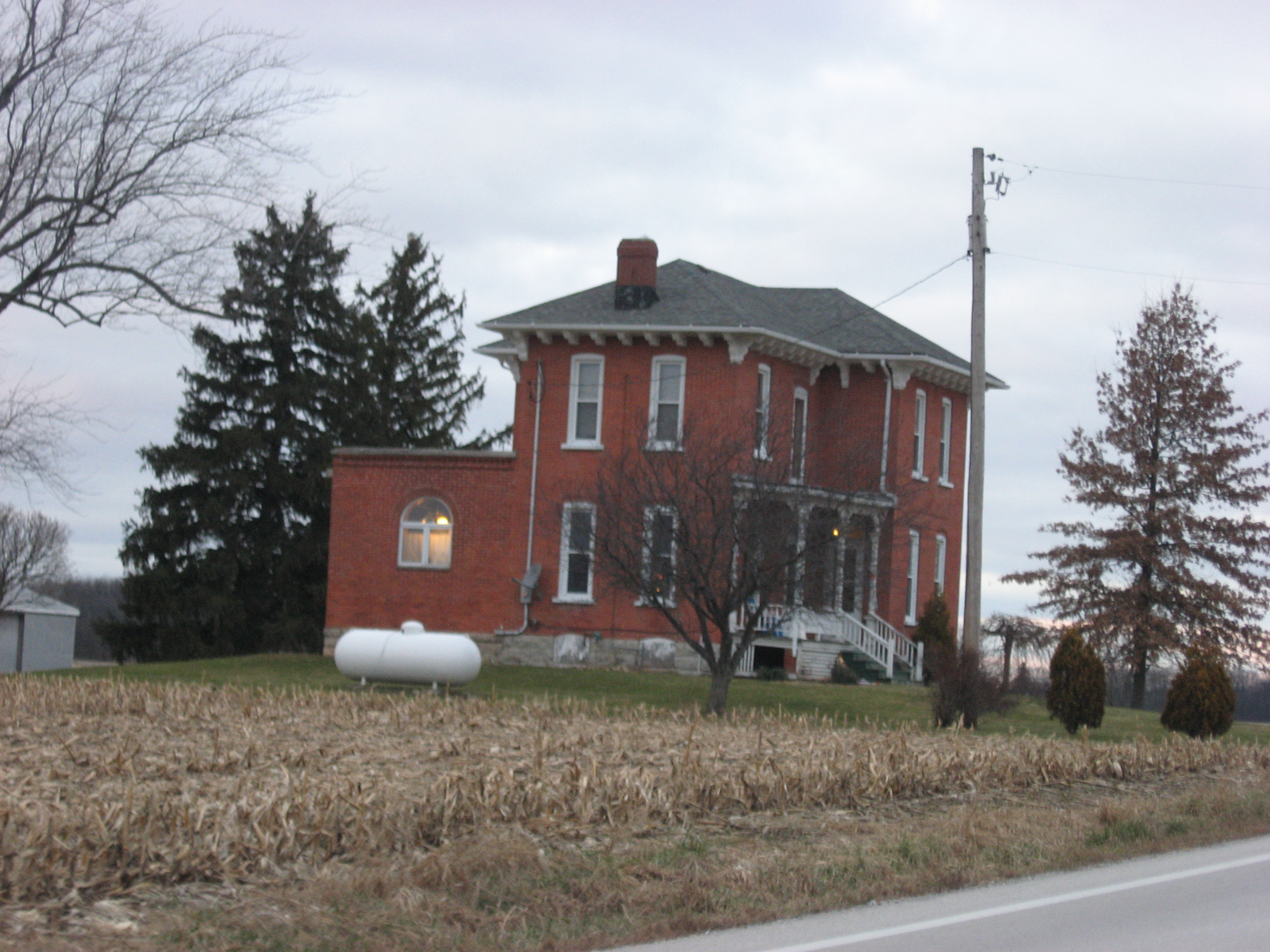
- The Michaels Farmhouse, a historic site in the township

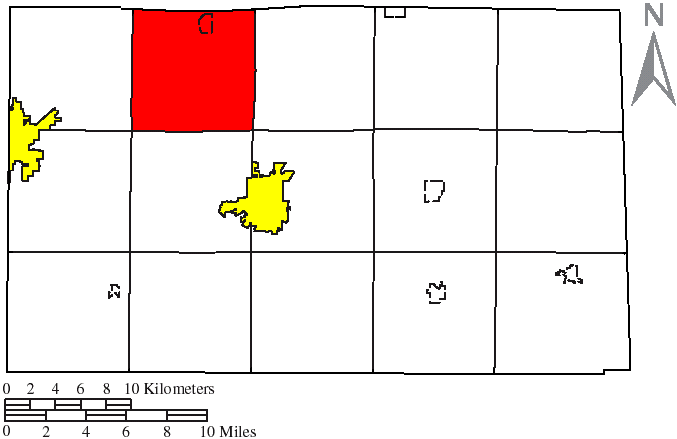
- Location of Liberty Township in Seneca County.
- Coordinates: 41°13′5″N 83°14′23″W
- Country: United States
- State: Ohio
- County: Seneca

Area
  - Total: 36.4 sq mi (94.2 km^{2})
  - Land: 36.4 sq mi (94.2 km^{2})
  - Water: 0 sq mi (0.0 km^{2})
- Elevation: 719 ft (219 m)

Population (2020)
  - Total: 2,029
  - Density: 55.8/sq mi (21.5/km^{2})
- Time zone: UTC-5 (Eastern (EST))
  - Summer (DST): UTC-4 (EDT)
- FIPS code: 39-43316
- GNIS feature ID: 1086949

Liberty Township is one of the fifteen townships of Seneca County, Ohio, United States. The 2020 census found 2,029 people in the township.

== Geography ==
Located in the northwestern part of the county, it borders the following townships:

- Jackson Township, Sandusky County - north
- Ballville Township, Sandusky County - northeast corner
- Pleasant Township - east
- Clinton Township - southeast corner
- Hopewell Township - south
- Loudon Township - southwest corner
- Jackson Township - west
- Scott Township, Sandusky County - northwest corner

The village of Bettsville is located in northern Liberty Township, and the census-designated place of Kansas lies in the northwestern part of the township.

== Name and history ==
Liberty Township was organized in 1832.

It is one of twenty-five Liberty Townships statewide.

== Government ==
The township is governed by a three-member board of trustees, who are elected in November of odd-numbered years to a four-year term beginning on the following January 1. Two are elected in the year after the presidential election and one is elected in the year before it. There is also an elected township fiscal officer, who serves a four-year term beginning on April 1 of the year after the election, which is held in November of the year before the presidential election. Vacancies in the fiscal officership or on the board of trustees are filled by the remaining trustees.
