= Amsden =

Amsden is a surname. Notable people with the surname include:

- Alice Amsden (1943–2012), American political economist
- C. S. Amsden (1856–1943), American politician in South Dakota
- Elizabeth Amsden (1881–1966), American opera singer and actress
- Frederick J. Amsden, 19th-century American architect
- Janet Amsden, British actress
- Ralph Amsden (1917–1988), American basketball player
- Rollin Amsden (1829–1899), American businessman and government official in Vermont
- Amsden Huang (born 2000), original name Jarrell Huang, Singaporean singer

== Other uses ==
- Amsden, Ohio, an unincorporated community in the United States
- Amsden Building collapse, an event in 1906 in Framingham, Massachusetts, U.S.
- Amsden Formation, a geological formation in Montana, U.S.
