= Siam, Ohio =

Siam
- Unincorporated community
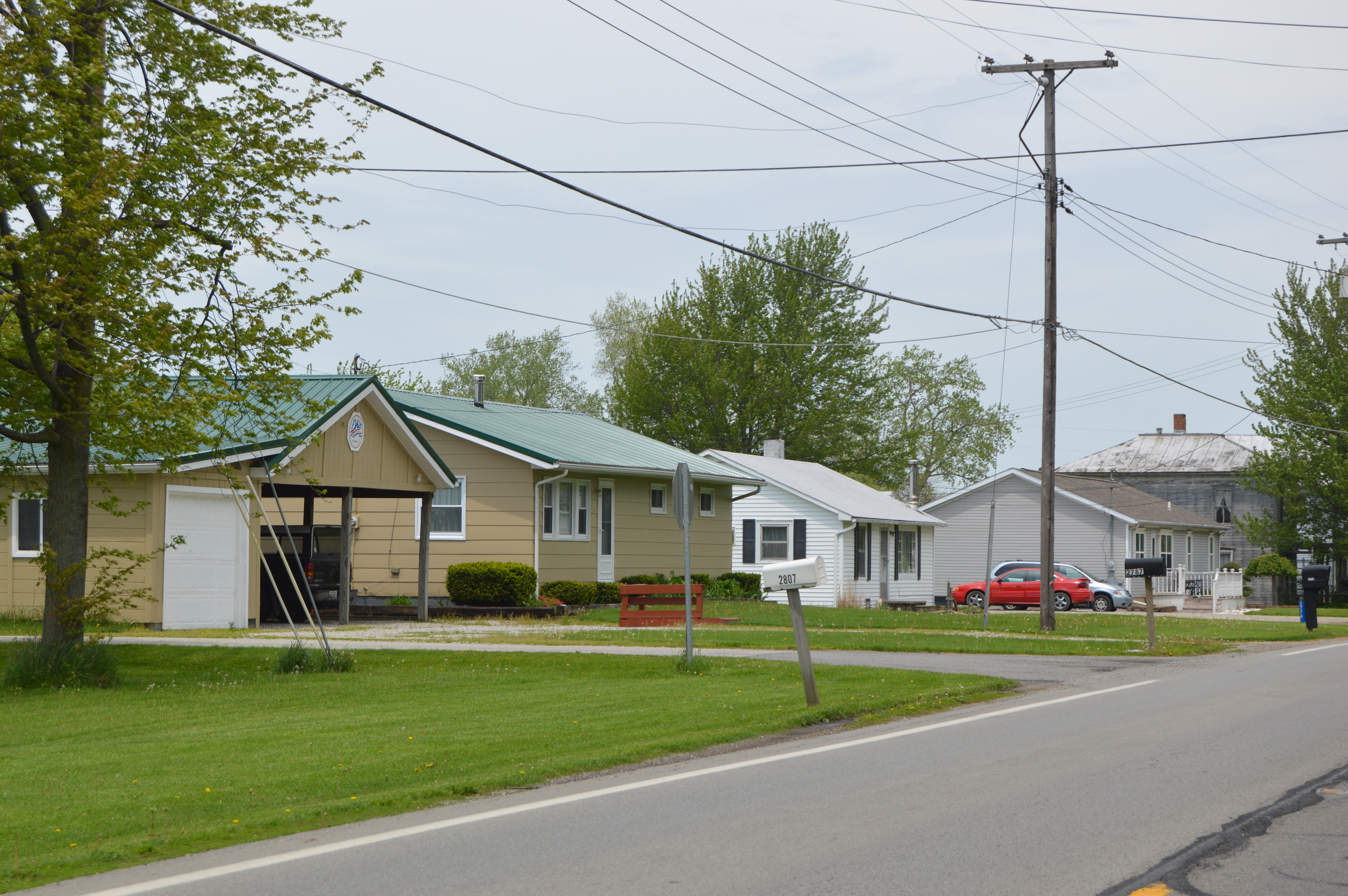
- Houses on State Route 4

- Location within the state of Ohio
- Coordinates: 41°05′05″N 82°52′42″W
- Country: United States
- State: Ohio
- County: Seneca
- Township: Reed
- Elevation: 958 ft (292 m)
- Time zone: UTC-5 (Eastern (EST))
  - Summer (DST): UTC-4 (EDT)
- ZIP codes: 44807
- GNIS feature ID: 1049178

Siam is an unincorporated community in Reed Township, Seneca County, Ohio, United States. This town is also known as Attica Junction. CSX and NS intersect here. It is located along State Route 4, just north of Attica. The community is served by the Attica (44807) post office.

== History ==
Siam was originally called Detroit; under the latter name had its start in 1875 when the railroad was extended to that point. A train station was soon built, which was called Attica Station. The post office in the community was operated under the name Siam. The Siam post office opened in 1878, and was discontinued in 1938.
