= Big Spring Township, Ohio =

Township in Ohio, US

- Township
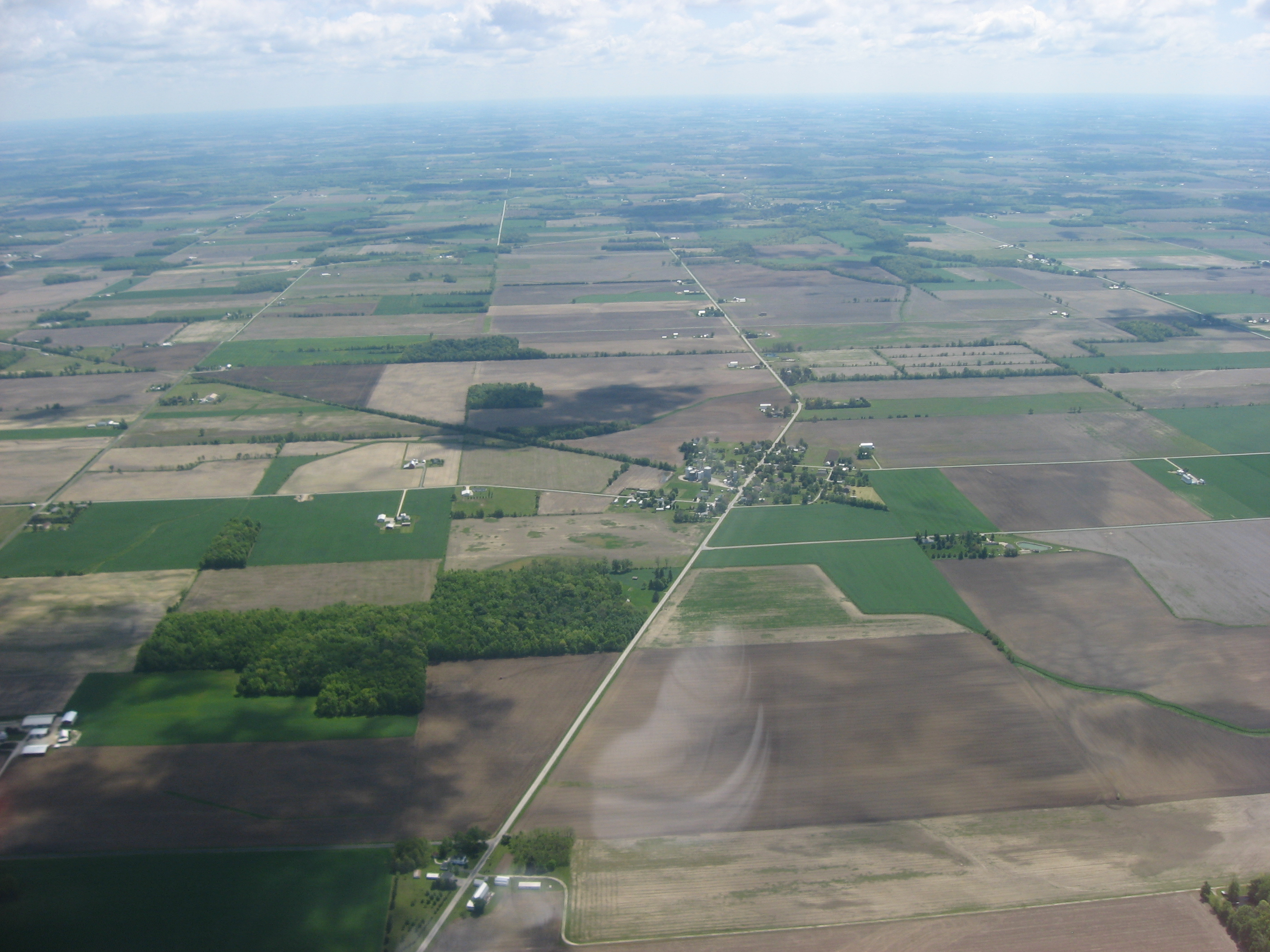
- Adrian, an unincorporated community in southeastern Big Spring Township

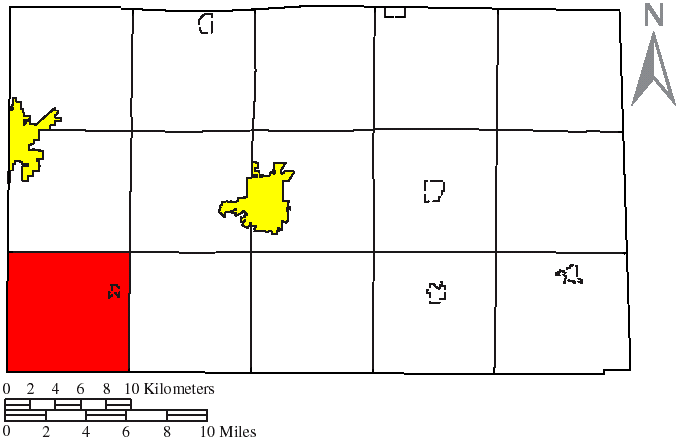
- Location of Big Spring Township in Seneca County.
- Coordinates: 41°1′57″N 83°21′28″W
- Country: United States
- State: Ohio
- County: Seneca

Area
  - Total: 36.4 sq mi (94.3 km^{2})
  - Land: 36.4 sq mi (94.2 km^{2})
  - Water: 0 sq mi (0.0 km^{2})
- Elevation: 840 ft (256 m)

Population (2020)
  - Total: 1,683
  - Density: 46/sq mi (17.9/km^{2})
- Time zone: UTC-5 (Eastern (EST))
  - Summer (DST): UTC-4 (EDT)
- FIPS code: 39-06432
- GNIS feature ID: 1086941

Big Spring Township is one of the fifteen townships of Seneca County, Ohio, United States. The 2020 census found 1,683 people in the township.

== Geography ==
Located in the southwestern corner of the county, it borders the following townships:

- Loudon Township - north
- Hopewell Township - northeast corner
- Seneca Township - east
- Tymochtee Township, Wyandot County - southeast corner
- Crawford Township, Wyandot County - south
- Ridge Township, Wyandot County - southwest corner
- Biglick Township, Hancock County - west
- Washington Township, Hancock County - northwest corner

The village of New Riegel is located in eastern Big Spring Township, and the unincorporated community of Alvada lies in the western part of the township. Big Spring Township also contains the unincorporated communities of Adrian and Springville.

== Name and history ==
Big Spring Township was organized in 1833. It was named from a creek in the southwestern part.

It is the only Big Spring Township statewide.

== Government ==
The township is governed by a three-member board of trustees, who are elected in November of odd-numbered years to a four-year term beginning on the following January 1. Two are elected in the year after the presidential election and one is elected in the year before it. There is also an elected township fiscal officer, who serves a four-year term beginning on April 1 of the year after the election, which is held in November of the year before the presidential election. Vacancies in the fiscal officership or on the board of trustees are filled by the remaining trustees.
