= Reedtown =

Reedtown may refer to:

- Reedtown, Ohio, an unincorporated community in Seneca County
- Reedtown, Virginia, an unincorporated community in Northampton County
