= Hopewell Township, Seneca County, Ohio =

Township in Ohio, US

- Township
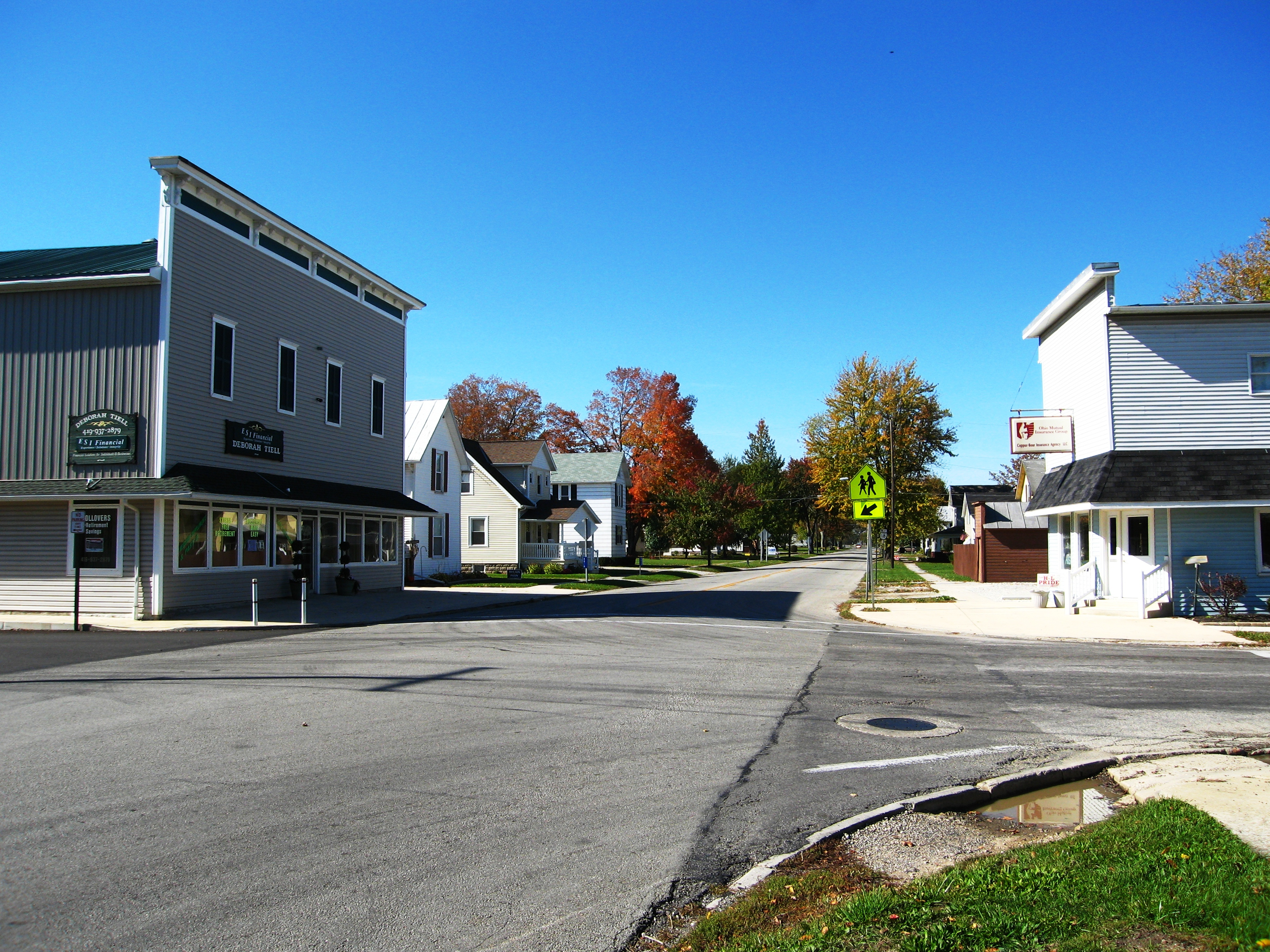
- Street scene in Bascom

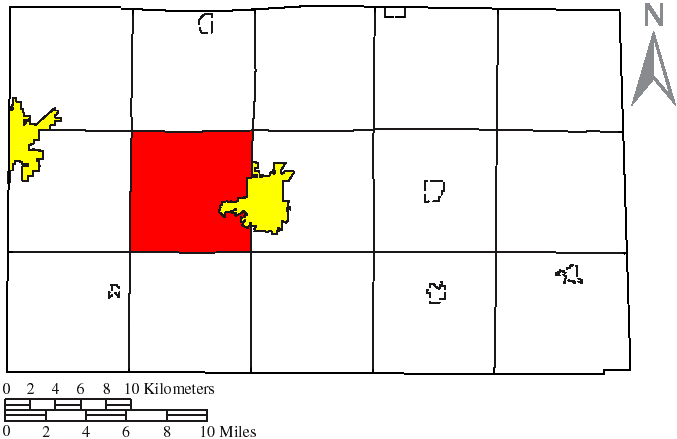
- Location of Hopewell Township (red) in Seneca County, adjacent to the city of Tiffin (yellow).
- Coordinates: 41°7′3″N 83°14′24″W
- Country: United States
- State: Ohio
- County: Seneca

Area
  - Total: 34.5 sq mi (89.4 km^{2})
  - Land: 34.4 sq mi (89.0 km^{2})
  - Water: 0.15 sq mi (0.4 km^{2})
- Elevation: 761 ft (232 m)

Population (2020)
  - Total: 2,672
  - Density: 78/sq mi (30/km^{2})
- Time zone: UTC-5 (Eastern (EST))
  - Summer (DST): UTC-4 (EDT)
- FIPS code: 39-36400
- GNIS feature ID: 1086947
- Website: https://hopewell-township.com/

Hopewell Township is one of the fifteen townships of Seneca County, Ohio, United States. The 2020 census found 2,672 people in the township.

== Geography ==
Located in the west central part of the county, it borders the following townships:

- Liberty Township - north
- Pleasant Township - northeast corner
- Clinton Township - east
- Eden Township - southeast corner
- Seneca Township - south
- Big Spring Township - southwest corner
- Loudon Township - west
- Jackson Township - northwest corner

Part of the city of Tiffin, the county seat of Seneca County, is located in eastern Hopewell Township, and the census-designated place of Bascom lies in the western part of the township.

== Name and history ==
Hopewell Township was organized in 1824.

It is one of five Hopewell Townships statewide.

== Government ==
The township is governed by a three-member board of trustees, who are elected in November of odd-numbered years to a four-year term beginning on the following January 1. Two are elected in the year after the presidential election and one is elected in the year before it. There is also an elected township fiscal officer, who serves a four-year term beginning on April 1 of the year after the election, which is held in November of the year before the presidential election. Vacancies in the fiscal officership or on the board of trustees are filled by the remaining trustees.
