= Scipio Township, Ohio =

Scipio Township, Ohio may refer to:

- Scipio Township, Meigs County, Ohio
- Scipio Township, Seneca County, Ohio
