= Lowell, Seneca County, Ohio =

Lowell, Ohio
- Unincorporated community
- Location within the state of Ohio
- Coordinates: 41°12′25″N 83°03′19″W
- Country: United States
- State: Ohio
- County: Seneca
- Township: Adams
- Time zone: UTC-5 (Eastern (EST))
  - Summer (DST): UTC-4 (EDT)

Lowell is an unincorporated community in Adams Township, Seneca County, Ohio, United States. It is located at the intersection of State Routes 101 and 778.

== History ==
A former variant name of Lowell was Adams. A post office called Adams was established in 1827, and remained in operation until 1879.
