= Iler =

Iler may refer to:

- Iler, Algeria, a town in Algeria
- Iler, Ohio, a community in the United States
- Frank Iler (born 1942), politician
- Robert Iler (born 1985), actor
