= FZI =

FZI may refer to:

- FZI Forschungszentrum Informatik, a non-profit research institute for applied computer science in Karlsruhe, Germany
- FZI, the FAA LID code for Fostoria Metropolitan Airport, Ohio, United States
