= Berwick, Ohio =

Berwick
- Unincorporated community
- Location within the state of Ohio
- Coordinates: 41°01′45″N 83°17′53″W
- Country: United States
- State: Ohio
- County: Seneca
- Township: Seneca
- Elevation: 840 ft (260 m)
- Time zone: UTC-5 (Eastern (EST))
  - Summer (DST): UTC-4 (EDT)
- ZIP codes: 44853
- GNIS feature ID: 1037881

Berwick is an unincorporated community in Seneca Township, Seneca County, Ohio, United States. It is located next to the intersection of East County Road 6 and State Route 587. The community is served by the New Riegel (44853) post office.

== History ==
Berwick was laid out and platted in 1845. The community was named after Berwick, Pennsylvania, the native home of a first settler. A post office called Berwick was established in 1848, and discontinued in 1955.
