= Fireside, Ohio =

Unincorporated community in Ohio, US

Coordinates: 41°13′35″N 82°54′43″W

Fireside is an unincorporated community in Seneca County, in the U.S. state of Ohio.

== History ==
A post office called Fireside was established in 1866, and remained in operation until 1900. The advent of Rural Free Delivery caused Fireside's post office to be discontinued.
