= Ballville Township, Ohio =

Township in Ohio, US

- Township
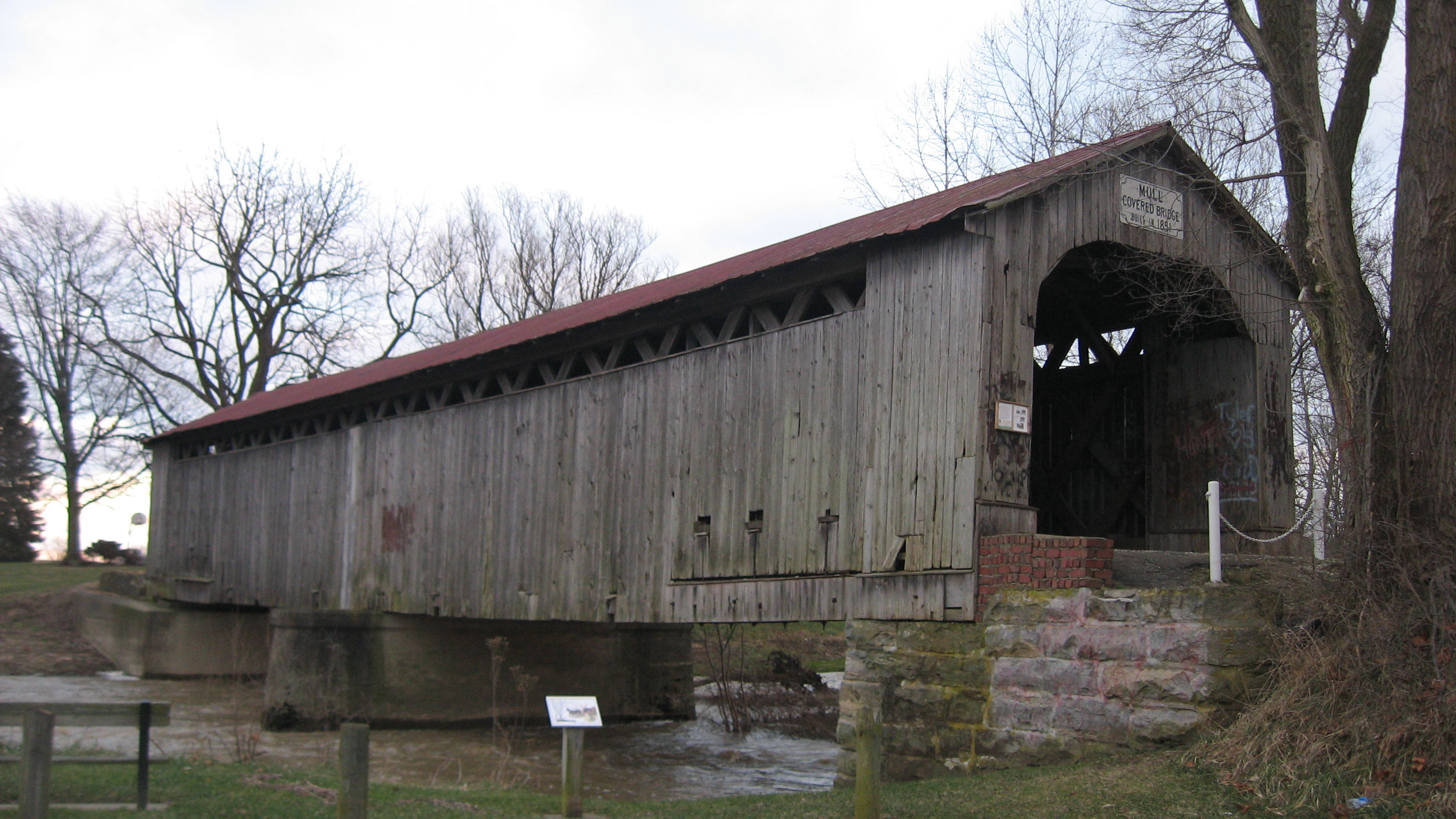
- The Mull Covered Bridge, a historic site in the township

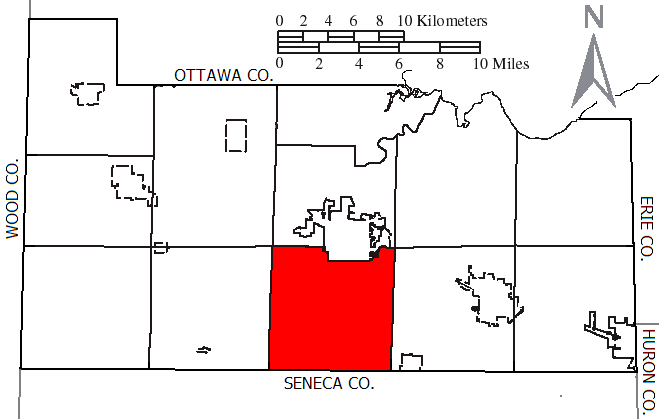
- Location of Ballville Township, Ohio.
- Coordinates: 41°19′10″N 83°7′45″W
- Country: United States
- State: Ohio
- County: Sandusky

Area
  - Total: 34.3 sq mi (88.8 km^{2})
  - Land: 33.9 sq mi (87.7 km^{2})
  - Water: 0.42 sq mi (1.1 km^{2})
- Elevation: 646 ft (197 m)

Population (2020)
  - Total: 6,042
  - Density: 178/sq mi (68.9/km^{2})
- Time zone: UTC-5 (Eastern (EST))
  - Summer (DST): UTC-4 (EDT)
- FIPS code: 39-03730
- GNIS feature ID: 1086907
- Website: Ballville Township

Ballville Township is one of the twelve townships of Sandusky County, Ohio, United States. As of the 2020 census, 6,042 people lived in the township.

== Geography ==
Located in the southern part of the county, it borders the following townships:

- Sandusky Township - north
- Riley Township - northeast corner
- Green Creek Township - east
- Adams Township, Seneca County - southeast corner
- Pleasant Township, Seneca County - south
- Liberty Township, Seneca County - southwest corner
- Jackson Township - west
- Washington Township - northwest corner

Part of the city of Fremont, the county seat of Sandusky County, is located in northern Ballville Township, as well as the census-designated place of Ballville.

The Sandusky River runs through Ballville Township prior to Fremont on its way to Lake Erie to the north.

== Name and history ==
Ballville Township was established in 1822 after a petition was submitted to the Sandusky County Commissioners to be set apart as a new township. Prior to the petition the township was part of the Sandusky Township. It was named for Colonel James V. Ball, a military leader in the War of 1812.

It is the only Ballville Township statewide.

== Government ==
The township is governed by a three-member board of trustees, who are elected in November of odd-numbered years to a four-year term beginning on the following January 1. Two are elected in the year after the presidential election and one is elected in the year before it. There is also an elected township fiscal officer, who serves a four-year term beginning on April 1 of the year after the election, which is held in November of the year before the presidential election. Vacancies in the fiscal officership or on the board of trustees are filled by the remaining trustees.

=== Township officials ===
Office	Name
Trustee	Mary Ann Reser
Trustee	Bob Kusmer
Trustee	Rich Farmer
Fiscal Officer	Tom Ackerman
