= Adrian, Ohio =

Unincorporated community in Ohio, U.S.

Coordinates: 41°00′05″N 83°19′23″W

Adrian is an unincorporated community on W County Road 59 in Big Spring township, in southwestern Seneca County, Ohio, United States, roughly three miles (five kilometres) south-southeast of Frenchtown.

== History ==
Adrian was originally called Oregon, and under the latter name was laid out in 1844. A post office called Adrian has been in operation since 1853.

== Notable person ==
- Darius D. Hare, politician
