= Rehoboth, Seneca County, Ohio =

Unincorporated community in Ohio, U.S.

Coordinates: 41°13′05″N 83°23′45″W

Rehoboth is an unincorporated community in Seneca County, in the U.S. state of Ohio.

== History ==
Rehoboth was laid out in 1844.
