= Cromers, Ohio =

Unincorporated community in Ohio, U.S.

Coordinates: 41°10′54″N 83°12′54″W

Cromers is an unincorporated community in Seneca County, in the U.S. state of Ohio.

== History ==
A post office was established at Cromers in 1875, and remained in operation until 1952. Besides the post office, Cromers had a railroad depot.
