= Angus, Ohio =

Unincorporated community in Ohio, U.S.

Coordinates: 41°11′48″N 83°17′06″W

Angus is an unincorporated community in Seneca County, in the U.S. state of Ohio.

== History ==
Angus was founded in 1883 by J. W. Angus when the railroad was extended to that point. A post office was established at Angus in 1883, and remained in operation until 1902.
