= Rockaway, Ohio =

Unincorporated community in Ohio, U.S.

Coordinates: 41°04′59″N 83°03′15″W

Rockaway is an unincorporated community in Seneca County, in the U.S. state of Ohio.

== History ==
A post office called Rockaway was established in 1874, and remained in operation until 1910. The advent of Rural Free Delivery caused Rockaway's post office to be discontinued.
