= Pleasant Township, Seneca County, Ohio =

Township in Ohio, US

- Township
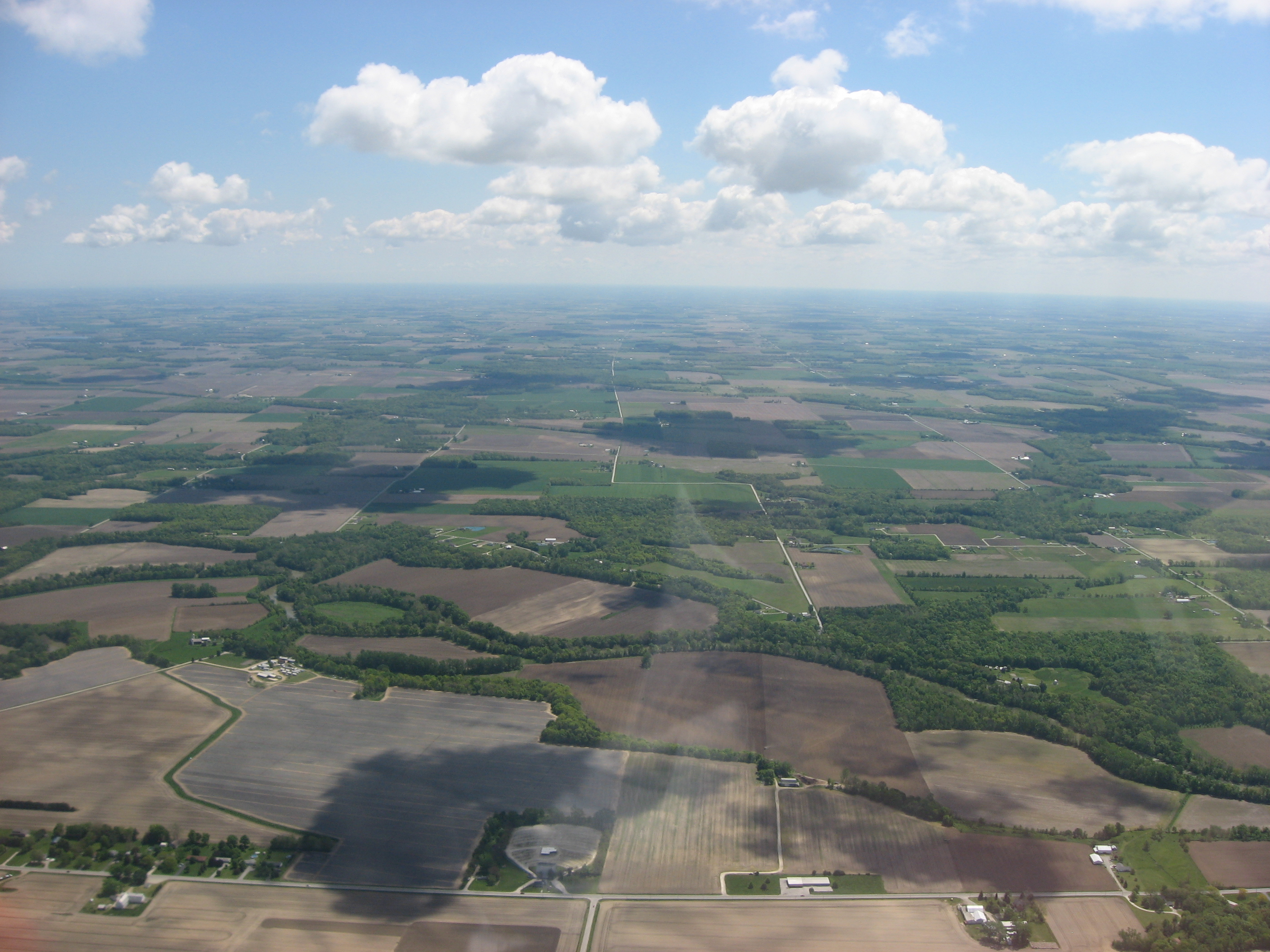
- Aerial view of the Sandusky River in Pleasant Township

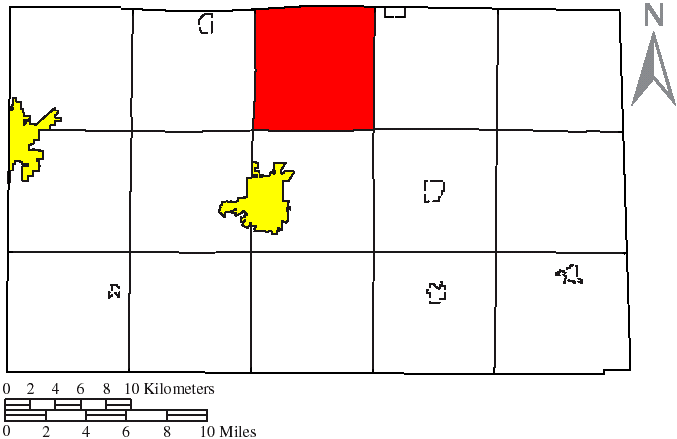
- Location of Pleasant Township in Seneca County
- Coordinates: 41°13′6″N 83°8′14″W
- Country: United States
- State: Ohio
- County: Seneca

Area
  - Total: 36.1 sq mi (93.5 km^{2})
  - Land: 35.6 sq mi (92.2 km^{2})
  - Water: 0.50 sq mi (1.3 km^{2})
- Elevation: 702 ft (214 m)

Population (2020)
  - Total: 1,477
  - Density: 41/sq mi (16/km^{2})
- Time zone: UTC-5 (Eastern (EST))
  - Summer (DST): UTC-4 (EDT)
- FIPS code: 39-63394
- GNIS feature ID: 1086951
- Website: https://www.pleasanttownshipsenecacounty.com/

Pleasant Township is one of the fifteen townships of Seneca County, Ohio, United States. The 2020 census found 1,477 people in the township.

== Geography ==
Located in the northern part of the county, it borders the following townships:

- Ballville Township, Sandusky County – north
- Green Creek Township, Sandusky County – northeast corner
- Adams Township – east
- Scipio Township – southeast corner
- Clinton Township – south
- Hopewell Township – southwest corner
- Liberty Township – west
- Jackson Township, Sandusky County – northwest corner

No municipalities are located in Pleasant Township, although it contains the census-designated places of Fort Seneca and Old Fort in the northern part of the township.

== Name and history ==
Pleasant Township was organized in 1831.

It is one of fifteen Pleasant Townships statewide.

== Government ==
The township is governed by a three-member board of trustees, who are elected in November of odd-numbered years to a four-year term beginning on the following January 1. Two are elected in the year after the presidential election and one is elected in the year before it. There is also an elected township fiscal officer, who serves a four-year term beginning on April 1 of the year after the election, which is held in November of the year before the presidential election. Vacancies in the fiscal officership or on the board of trustees are filled by the remaining trustees.
