= Reedtown, Ohio =

Unincorporated community in Ohio, U.S.

Coordinates: 41°9′7″N 82°50′50″W

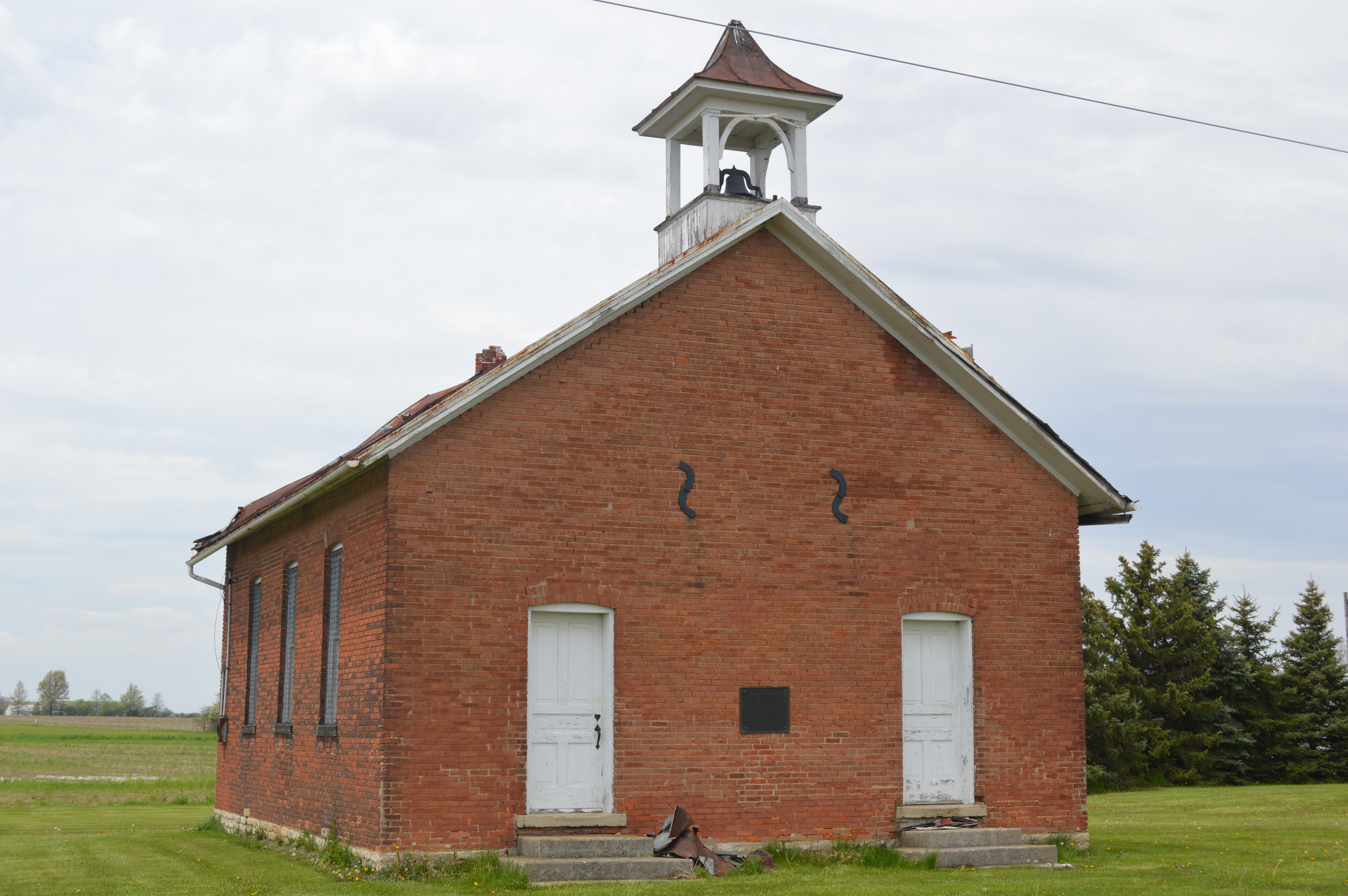
Former schoolhouse

Reedtown is an unincorporated community in Seneca County, in the U.S. state of Ohio.

== History ==
A post office called Reedtown was established in 1828, and remained in operation until 1903. Like Reed Township, Reedtown derives its name from Seth Read, a pioneer settler.
