= Watson, Ohio =

Unincorporated community in Ohio, U.S.

Coordinates: 41°11′22″N 83°06′19″W

Watson is an unincorporated community in Seneca County, in the U.S. state of Ohio.

== History ==
A former variant name was Watsons Station. A post office called Watsons Station was established in 1854, the name was changed to Watson in 1882, and the post office closed in 1923. Besides the post office, Watson had a railroad station, a general store, and grain elevator.
