= Seneca Township, Seneca County, Ohio =

Township in Ohio, US

- Township
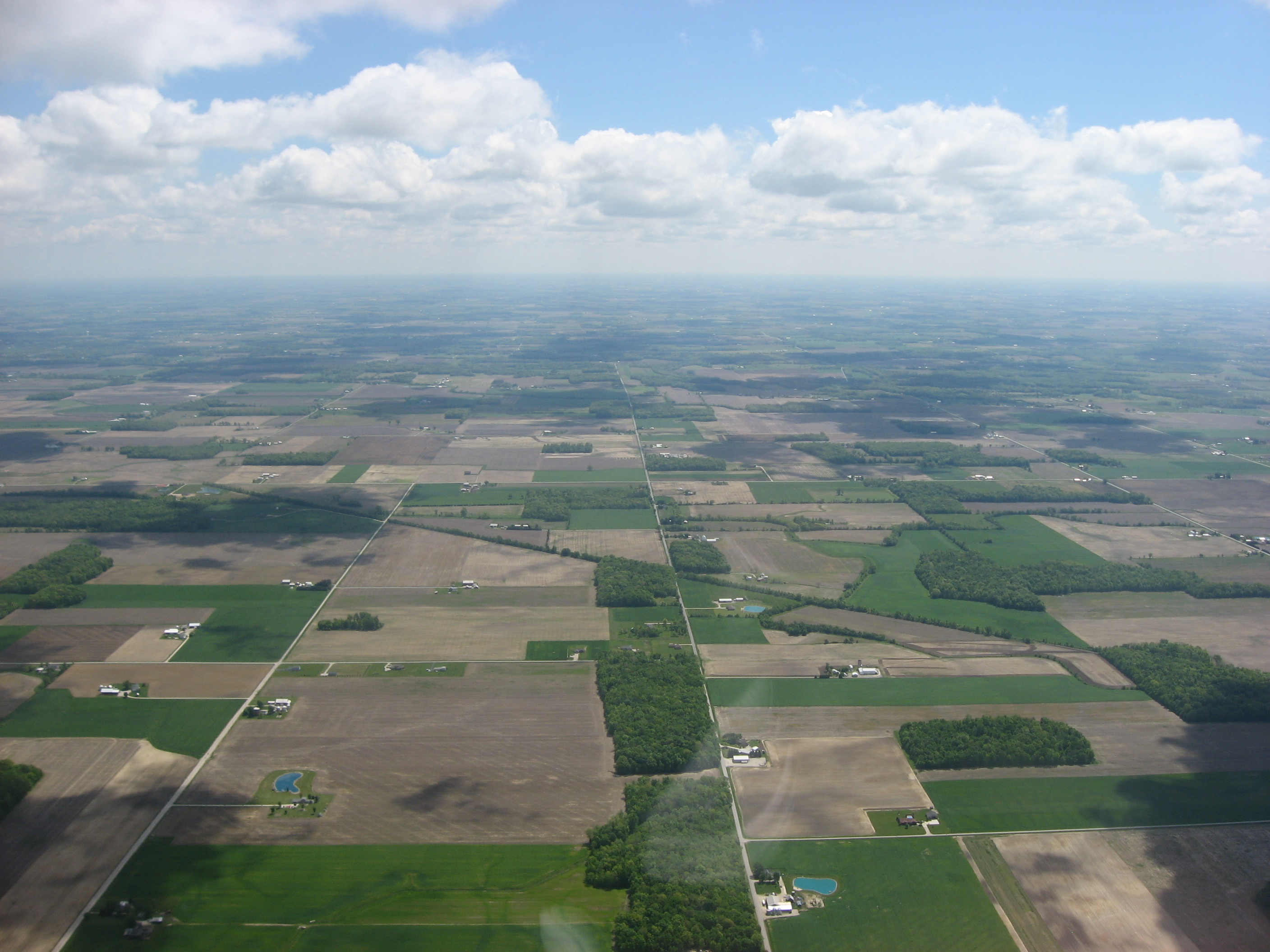
- Countryside just east of New Riegel

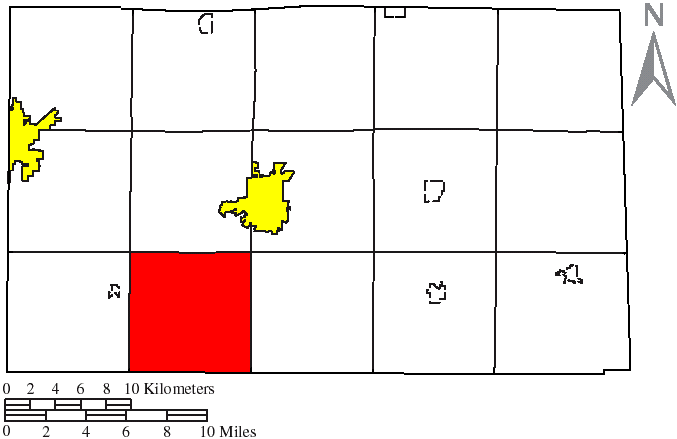
- Location of Seneca Township in Seneca County
- Coordinates: 41°2′20″N 83°14′27″W
- Country: United States
- State: Ohio
- County: Seneca

Area
  - Total: 36.1 sq mi (93.4 km^{2})
  - Land: 35.6 sq mi (92.2 km^{2})
  - Water: 0.46 sq mi (1.2 km^{2})
- Elevation: 810 ft (247 m)

Population (2020)
  - Total: 1,444
  - Density: 41/sq mi (15.7/km^{2})
- Time zone: UTC-5 (Eastern (EST))
  - Summer (DST): UTC-4 (EDT)
- FIPS code: 39-71355
- GNIS feature ID: 1086954

Seneca Township is one of the fifteen townships of Seneca County, Ohio, United States. The 2020 census found 1,444 people in the township.

== Geography ==
Located in the southwestern part of the county, it borders the following townships:

- Hopewell Township - north
- Clinton Township - northeast corner
- Eden Township - east
- Sycamore Township, Wyandot County - southeast corner
- Tymochtee Township, Wyandot County - south
- Crawford Township, Wyandot County - southwest corner
- Big Spring Township - west
- Loudon Township - northwest corner

No municipalities are located in Seneca Township.

== Name and history ==
Seneca Township was established in 1820.

Statewide, other Seneca Townships are located in Monroe and Noble counties.

== Government ==
The township is governed by a three-member board of trustees, who are elected in November of odd-numbered years to a four-year term beginning on the following January 1. Two are elected in the year after the presidential election and one is elected in the year before it. There is also an elected township fiscal officer, who serves a four-year term beginning on April 1 of the year after the election, which is held in November of the year before the presidential election. Vacancies in the fiscal officership or on the board of trustees are filled by the remaining trustees.
