= Green Creek Township, Sandusky County, Ohio =

Township in Ohio, US

- Township
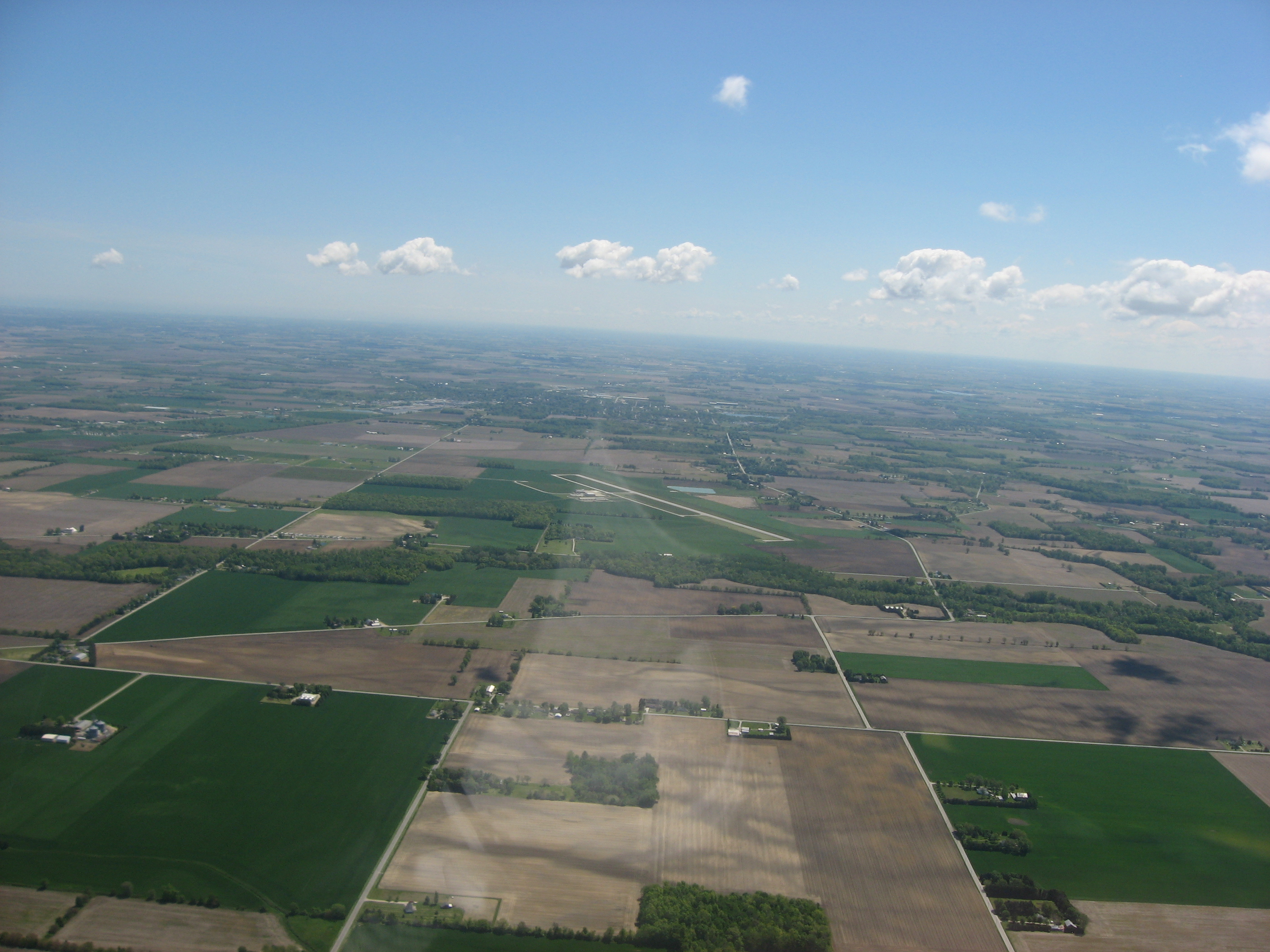
- The Sandusky County Regional Airport, in western Green Creek Township

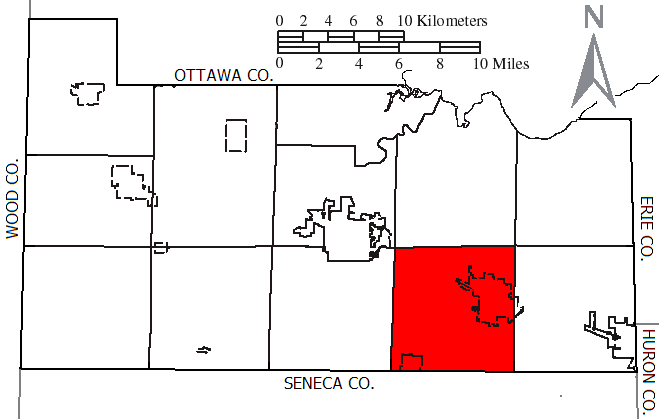
- Location of Green Creek Township, Sandusky County, Ohio
- Coordinates: 41°18′7″N 82°59′56″W
- Country: United States
- State: Ohio
- County: Sandusky

Area
  - Total: 35.2 sq mi (91.2 km^{2})
  - Land: 35.1 sq mi (91.0 km^{2})
  - Water: 0.077 sq mi (0.2 km^{2})
- Elevation: 643 ft (196 m)

Population (2020)
  - Total: 3,389
  - Density: 96/sq mi (37.2/km^{2})
- Time zone: UTC-5 (Eastern (EST))
  - Summer (DST): UTC-4 (EDT)
- FIPS code: 39-31990
- GNIS feature ID: 1086910
- Website: https://sites.google.com/site/greencreektownship/

Green Creek Township is one of the twelve townships of Sandusky County, Ohio, United States. As of the 2020 census, 3,389 people lived in the township

== Geography ==
Located in the southeastern part of the county, it borders the following townships:

- Riley Township - north
- Townsend Township - northeast corner
- York Township - east
- Thompson Township, Seneca County - southeast corner
- Adams Township, Seneca County - southeast
- Pleasant Township, Seneca County - southwest corner
- Ballville Township - west
- Sandusky Township - northwest corner

Most of the city of Clyde is located in eastern Green Creek Township, and part of the village of Green Springs lies in the township's southwest.

== Name and history ==
Green Creek Township was established in 1822. Named after Green Creek, the largest stream which runs through the area, it is the only Green Creek Township statewide.

== Government ==
The township is governed by a three-member board of trustees, who are elected in November of odd-numbered years to a four-year term beginning on the following January 1. Two are elected in the year after the presidential election and one is elected in the year before it. There is also an elected township fiscal officer, who serves a four-year term beginning on April 1 of the year after the election, which is held in November of the year before the presidential election. Vacancies in the fiscal officership or on the board of trustees are filled by the remaining trustees.

=== Township officials ===
Office	Name
Trustee	Matt Hofelich
Trustee	Bill Ebert
Trustee	Jim Newsome
Fiscal Officer	Danyelle Lantz
