= Fostoria Metropolitan Airport =

Donald P. Miller Fostoria Metropolitan Airport
- IATA: none; ICAO: KFZI; FAA LID: FZI

Summary
- Airport type: Public
- Owner: City of Fostoria
- Serves: Fostoria, Ohio
- Time zone: UTC−05:00 (-5)
  - Summer (DST): UTC−04:00 (-4)
- Elevation AMSL: 752 ft (229 m)
- Coordinates: 41°11′27″N 083°23′40″W
- Website: www.fostoriaohio.gov/airport

Map
- Location of airport in Ohio FZI (the United States)

Runways
Direction	Length		Surface
Direction	ft	m	Surface
9/27	5,000	1,524	Asphalt

Statistics (2008)
- Aircraft operations: 7,900
- Based aircraft: 14
- Source: Federal Aviation Administration

Fostoria Metropolitan Airport (ICAO: KFZI, FAA LID: FZI) (Note: The airport formerly used the FAA location identifier 5G3.) is a city-owned public airport two miles northeast of Fostoria, Ohio, United States. The FAA's National Plan of Integrated Airport Systems for 2009-2013 classified it as a general aviation airport.

Most U.S. airports use the same three-letter location identifier for the FAA and IATA, but this airport is FZI to the FAA and has no IATA code.

== History ==
A dispute arose between Bluffton and Fostoria in late 1967, with both claiming the same portion of funding made available by the state of Ohio for the construction of a new airport in Hancock County. Despite the latter's protests, the county commissioners confirmed that the grant would go to the former in early November.

The city then attempted to obtain an identical grant that had been authorized for Paulding County, as that county was unable to use it. The first effort involved transferring the funds to Seneca County, in which Fostoria was partially located. However, it was rejected by the state as the county had already received one of the grants for its own airport. The city then asked Paulding directly to transfer the money to the city, but it refused. Finally, Fostoria approached Wood County. As a portion of it was also in that county, the board of commissioners offered to accept the money on behalf of the city in mid June 1969. (Note: The county was not eligible for the grant as it already had two airports and/or no plans to build one.) (Note: As part of the agreement, Wood County was allocated an additional $50,000 from unused funds from the county airport program. This was unrelated to a later $50,000 supplemental grant, for which it – along with all other Ohio airports – was also eligible.) Less than a week later, the city purchased 170 acres (69 ha) of land for the airport. Approval of the state grant was received minutes before the midnight June 30th deadline.

By mid June 1969, the city had begun petitioning for federal funds for the airport project. However, by late September it had been rejected twice by the FAA.

By late April 1971, the airport had received seven bids for improvements. The city accepted a nearly $350,000 grant from the federal government that June to build a lighted 4,200-by-100-foot (1,280 m × 30 m) runway, taxiway and 300-by-150-foot (91 m × 46 m) apron. (Note: The grant had actually been authorized in late April.) The next week bids were being solicited for the construction of an administration building, maintenance hangar and eight-unit t-hangar. (Note: Toledo tried to take over Wood County's grant the same month. Despite the city itself being in Lucas County, the Toledo Municipal Airport was located in Wood County.) Ground was broken in mid July and three months later paving was underway. The first plane landed at the airport in late November. It had been completed by mid August 1972, but the opening was delayed due to the owner of a nearby parcel of land refusing to grant an easement to trim trees that were obstructing the runway. The city agreed to pay the owner for the easement later that month. An airport manager was hired in September. The airport was due to be dedicated on 8 October 1972. An airport authority was created in late August 1973.

Rex Damschroder received a contract to manage the airport in September 1975.

Two separate proposals to rename the airport for two sets of brothers were dismissed in March 1981.

Damschroder requested a subsidy to operate the airport in February 1989, claiming that it was otherwise unprofitable. The contract was given to CRC Aviation Company, which agreed to run the airport for a smaller subsidy.

The city received a state grant to upgrade the lighting at the airport in late October 1994.

In 1999, the airport was one of several considered as a potential site for the Angel Technologies Corporation, which operated high altitude aircraft for wireless communication. It received state and federal grants to repave the runway in late September 2001.

The airport received a federal grant to install a weather station and make other improvements in mid June 2004. The city announced plans to seek funding to extend the runway to 5,000 feet (1,500 m) in June 2006. It received a federal grant to do so in 2008.

An airport hangar was destroyed by a fire in 2018.

The airport received a $600,000 grant in 2023 to reconstruct its terminal building. The new building was opened in mid June 2026.

== Facilities ==
The airport covers 201 acres (81 ha) at an elevation of 752 feet (229 m) above sea level. Its one runway, 9/27, is 5,000 by 100 feet (1,524 x 30 m) asphalt.

In the year ending October 04, 2018 the airport had 8,030 aircraft operations, average 22 per day: 95% general aviation and 5% air taxi. 11 aircraft were then based at this airport: 9 single-engine airplanes, 1 multi-engine airplane, and 1 jet.

The airport has a fixed-base operator with fuel and limited amenities.

== Accidents and incidents ==
- On August 17, 2002, a Boeing Stearman E75L300 was substantially damaged when it collided with terrain shortly after takeoff from Fostoria Metropolitan Airport. According to a witness, the airplane made a normal takeoff from runway 27, though it did not appear to climb well. As the airplane reached the departure end of the runway, it started a 10- to 15-degree bank turn to the left. It simultaneously pitched up and slowed down, then began to "rotate" around the left wing with the nose pointed down toward the ground. Upon impact, the plane bounced, then hit the ground again in a flat attitude; its wings folded on second impact. The probable cause of the accident was found to be a missing flight control sealed bearing, which resulted in a loss of control in flight.
- On April 3, 2007, a Boeing E75N1 was damaged while landing at Fostoria Airport. The aircraft was substantially damaged during landing when it departed the runway and nosed over while landing at the airport for fuel. The pilot reported that a gust of wind struck the plane during landing. The probable cause of the accident was found to be the pilot's inadequate compensation for wind conditions and his subsequent failure to maintain directional control during landing.
- On August 20, 2023, a Mooney M20 crashed after departure from Fostoria Airport. The pilot was performing touch-and-gos when the engine lost power. The pilot made a successful landing in a field.

== See also ==
- List of airports in Ohio
