= Seneca County Airport =

- IATA: none; ICAO: none; FAA LID: 16G

Summary
- Airport type: Public
- Owner: Seneca County
- Serves: Seneca County
- Location: Tiffin, Ohio
- Opened: 1968
- Built: 1967
- Time zone: UTC−05:00 (-5)
  - Summer (DST): UTC−04:00 (-4)
- Elevation AMSL: 786 ft (240 m)
- Coordinates: 41°05′38″N 083°12′45″W

Map
- Location of airport in Ohio 16G (the United States)

Runways
Direction	Length		Surface
Direction	ft	m	Surface
6/24	4,000	1,219.2	Asphalt

Statistics (2021)
- Aircraft operations: 60,225
- Based aircraft: 33
- Source: Federal Aviation Administration

The Seneca County Airport (FAA LID: 16G) is a county-owned public-use airport located 2 miles (3.2 km) southwest of the central business district of Tiffin, a city in Seneca County, Ohio, United States.

== History ==
Planning for the airport began in 1944. The airport was originally intended to be a municipal airport for the city of Tiffin. Though an appointed committee decided there was need for an airport, no action was taken until 1954, when a firm was hired to develop a master plan for the airport.

In December 1964, the city approved a plan to buy 240 acres (97 ha) and then lease it to Dwight Knepper to operate. As a previous bond issue had failed, it announced plans for a fundraising effort to pay for the airport with public donations in late February 1965. After a period of dormancy, the fundraising effort was restarted in mid June. By the third week of September, it was discovered that state grants were only available to airports administered at the county level. As a result, plans for a municipal airport were scrapped and replaced by those for a county airport. Initially, a location near Bascom was proposed. However, by late September, a site in Bettsville was being considered as a compromise to include Fremont.

The land was transferred to the county by early June 1966. Later that month, it was announced that a 36,000-square-foot (3,300 m^{2}) factory would be built in an adjacent industrial park. A $100,000 state grant was authorized by mid July.

Airport construction began in 1967. However, work was paused when heavy rain resulted in the base under the runway failing. Construction resumed in early October. The airport and its 4,000-foot (1,200 m) long runway were dedicated on 18 August 1968. Construction of a 30,000-square-foot (2,800 m^{2}) factory for the Hansen Machine Company in the industrial park had begun by early February 1970. Airport infrastructure was greatly expanded in the 1970s: lighting, an airport radio frequency, and navigational equipment were installed.

The airport received a grant in the 1990s to remove obstacles located at either end of the runway. Additional hangars were also built.

The airport received $230,000 in 2012 to upgrade its runway and pavement as well as to install guidance signage.

As of 2024, the airport has updated its weather reporting system and is planning to update its master plan. The airport's federal funding has increased from $159,000 to nearly $300,000.

== Facilities and aircraft ==
Seneca County Airport has one runway designated as runway 6/24. It measures 4,000 x 75 ft (1,219.2 x 22.9 m) and is paved with asphalt.

The airport has a fixed-base operator, Tiffin Aire, that sells fuel. It has services such as aircraft maintenance, oxygen, hangars, and courtesy transportation; amenities such as internet, a conference room, pilot supplies, a crew lounge, showers, and more are available. Tiffin Aire is also a maintenance center specializing in propellers.

For the 12-month period ending October 1, 2021, the airport had 60,225 aircraft operations, an average of 165 per day. This included 91% general aviation, 8% air taxi, and <1% military. For the same time period, 33 aircraft were based at the airport, including 22 single-engine and 10 multi-engine airplanes as well as 1 jet airplane.

== Accidents & incidents ==
- On September 18, 2005, a Piper PA-24 Comanche was substantially damaged when it impacted terrain after departure from runway 24 at the Seneca County Airport. A witness reported that he thought he heard the plane attempting to return to the airport after takeoff. Engine power sounded intermittent. The probable cause of the accident was found to be the pilot's decision to takeoff in weather below the published takeoff minimums, which resulted in spatial disorientation and the airplane's collision with trees and terrain.

== See also ==
- List of airports in Ohio
