= Cooper, Ohio =

Unincorporated community in Ohio, U.S.

Coordinates: 41°10′08″N 82°58′37″W

Cooper is an unincorporated community in Seneca County, in the U.S. state of Ohio.

== History ==
A post office called Cooper was established in 1899, and remained in operation until 1903. The advent of Rural Free Delivery caused Cooper's post office to be shut down.
