= Maple Grove, Ohio =

Unincorporated community in Ohio, U.S.

Coordinates: 41°12′52″N 83°13′32″W

Maple Grove is an unincorporated community in Seneca County, in the U.S. state of Ohio.

== History ==
Maple Grove was originally called Linden. A post office called Maple Grove was established in 1885, and remained in operation until 1955.
