= Weiker Airport =

- IATA: none; ICAO: none; FAA LID: 82D

Summary
- Airport type: Public
- Owner: Wayne Weiker
- Serves: Green Springs, Ohio
- Location: Seneca County
- Elevation AMSL: 740 ft (230 m)
- Coordinates: 41°13′45″N 083°01′45″W

Map
- Location of airport in Ohio 82D (the United States)

Runways
Direction	Length		Surface
Direction	ft	m	Surface
18/36	1,744	532	Turf

Statistics (2008)
- Aircraft operations: 320
- Source: Federal Aviation Administration

Weiker Airport (FAA LID: 82D) was a privately owned public-use airport in Seneca County, Ohio, United States. It is located two nautical miles (4 km) southeast of the central business district of the village Green Springs, Ohio. It was privately owned by Wayne Weiker.

== Facilities and aircraft ==
Weiker Airport covered an area of 120 acres (49 ha) at an elevation of 740 feet (226 m) above mean sea level. It had one runway, designated as runway 18/36. It measured 1,744 by 90 ft (532 x 27 m) and has a turf surface. For the 12-month period ending May 7, 2008, the airport had 320 aircraft operations, all of which were general aviation.
