= Jackson Township, Seneca County, Ohio =

Township in Ohio, US

- Township
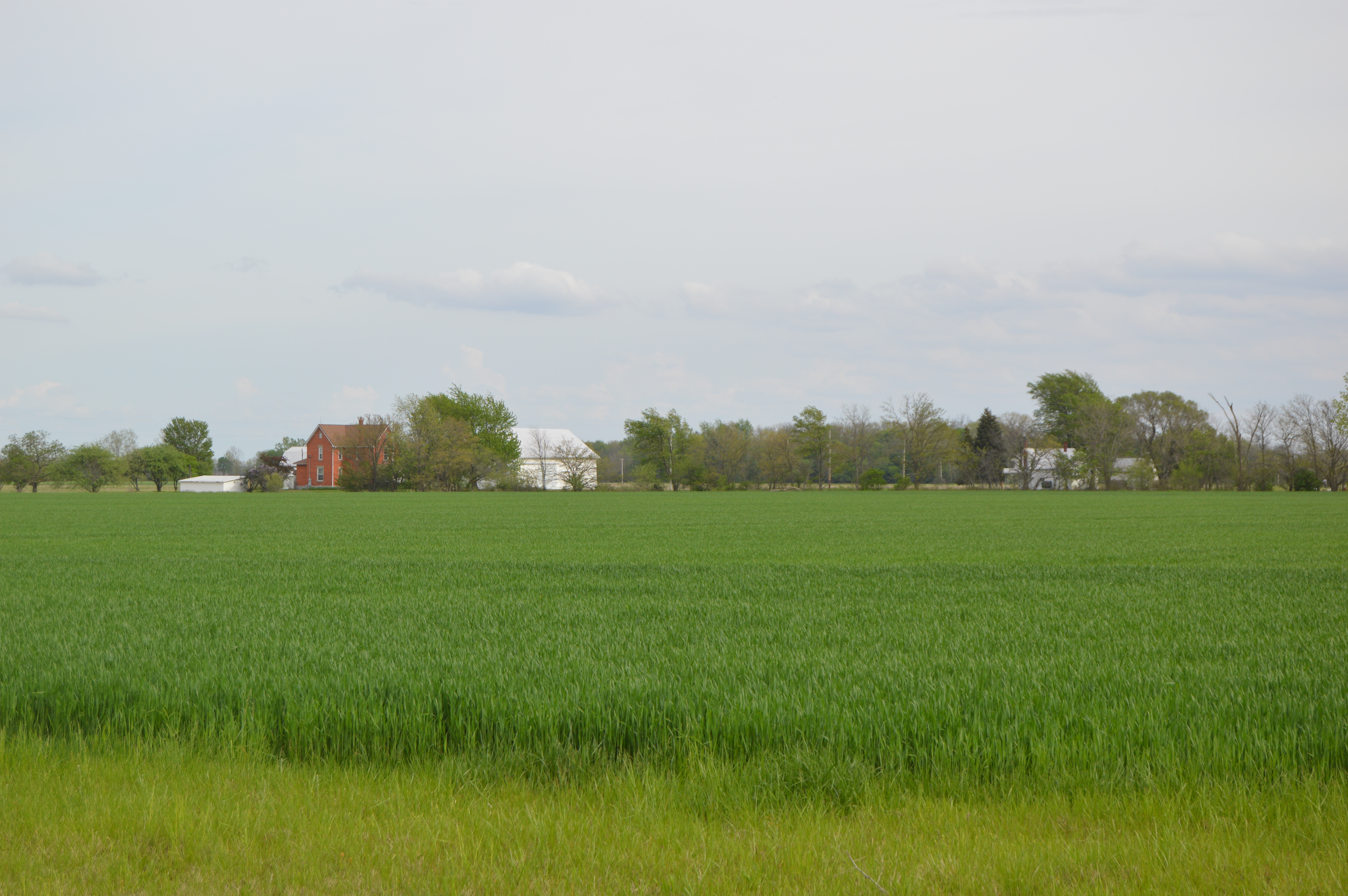
- Fields along State Route 12

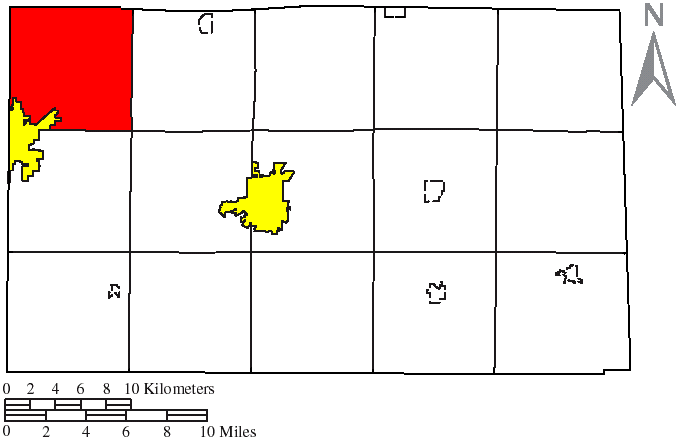
- Location of Jackson Township (red) in Seneca County, adjacent to the city of Fostoria (yellow).
- Coordinates: 41°12′51″N 83°21′53″W
- Country: United States
- State: Ohio
- County: Seneca

Area
  - Total: 34.9 sq mi (90.3 km^{2})
  - Land: 34.9 sq mi (90.3 km^{2})
  - Water: 0 sq mi (0.0 km^{2})
- Elevation: 725 ft (221 m)

Population (2020)
  - Total: 1,401
  - Density: 40.2/sq mi (15.5/km^{2})
- Time zone: UTC-5 (Eastern (EST))
  - Summer (DST): UTC-4 (EDT)
- FIPS code: 39-38066
- GNIS feature ID: 1086948
- Website: https://jacksontwpseneca.org/

Jackson Township is one of the fifteen townships of Seneca County, Ohio, United States. The 2020 census found 1,401 people in the township.

== Geography ==
Located in the northwestern corner of the county, it borders the following townships:

- Scott Township, Sandusky County - north
- Jackson Township, Sandusky County - northeast corner
- Liberty Township - east
- Hopewell Township -southeast corner
- Loudon Township - south
- Washington Township, Hancock County - southwest corner
- Perry Township, Wood County - west
- Montgomery Township, Wood County - northwest corner

Part of the city of Fostoria is located in southwestern Jackson Township.

== Name and history ==
Jackson Township was organized in 1832.

It is one of thirty-seven Jackson Townships statewide.

== Government ==
The township is governed by a three-member board of trustees, who are elected in November of odd-numbered years to a four-year term beginning on the following January 1. Two are elected in the year after the presidential election and one is elected in the year before it. There is also an elected township fiscal officer, who serves a four-year term beginning on April 1 of the year after the election, which is held in November of the year before the presidential election. Vacancies in the fiscal officership or on the board of trustees are filled by the remaining trustees.
