= Omar, Ohio =

Unincorporated community in Ohio, U.S.

Coordinates: 41°07′27″N 82°52′17″W

Omar is an unincorporated community in Seneca County, in the U.S. state of Ohio.

== History ==
Omar had its start in 1854 when the railroad was extended into the area. A post office called Omar was established in 1874, and remained in operation until 1935.

== See also ==
- Omar Chapel
