= Carrothers, Ohio =

Carrothers
- Unincorporated community
- Location within the state of Ohio
- Coordinates: 40°59′53″N 82°55′20″W
- Country: United States
- State: Ohio
- County: Seneca
- Township: Venice
- Elevation: 968 ft (295 m)
- Time zone: UTC-5 (Eastern (EST))
  - Summer (DST): UTC-4 (EDT)
- GNIS feature ID: 1048584

Carrothers (/kəˈrʌθərz/ kə-RUH-dherz) is an unincorporated community in Venice Township, Seneca County, Ohio, United States. It is located along State Route 4, just north of the border between Seneca and Crawford County. The community is served by the Attica (44807) post office.

== History ==
Carrothers was platted in 1873 by James Carrothers, and named for him. A post office was established at Carrothers in 1874.
