= Swander, Ohio =

Unincorporated community in Ohio, U.S.

Swander
- Coordinates: 41°05′43″N 83°05′36″W
- Country: United States
- State: Ohio
- County: Seneca

Swander is an unincorporated community in Seneca County, in the U.S. state of Ohio.

== History ==
The post office Swander once had was called Morris. The Morris post office was established in 1874, and discontinued in 1903. Swander was the name of a prominent local family.
