= Saint Stephens, Ohio =

Unincorporated community in Ohio, U.S.

Coordinates: 41°01′22″N 82°57′30″W

Saint Stephens is an unincorporated community in Seneca County, in the U.S. state of Ohio.

== History ==
The community's namesake St. Stephen Roman Catholic Church was founded in 1842. A post office called Saint Stephens was established in 1876, and remained in operation until 1957.
