= Amsden, Ohio =

Amsden
- Unincorporated community
- Location within the state of Ohio
- Coordinates: 41°12′58″N 83°19′43″W
- Country: United States
- State: Ohio
- County: Seneca
- Township: Jackson
- Elevation: 728 ft (222 m)
- Time zone: UTC-5 (Eastern (EST))
  - Summer (DST): UTC-4 (EDT)
- ZIP codes: 44830
- GNIS feature ID: 1060821

Amsden is an unincorporated community in Jackson Township, Seneca County, Ohio, United States. The community is served by the Fostoria (44830) post office.

== History ==
Amsden had its start when the railroad was extended to that point. A post office called Amsden was established in 1874, and remained in operation until 2002.
