= Thompson Township, Seneca County, Ohio =

Township in Ohio, US

- Township
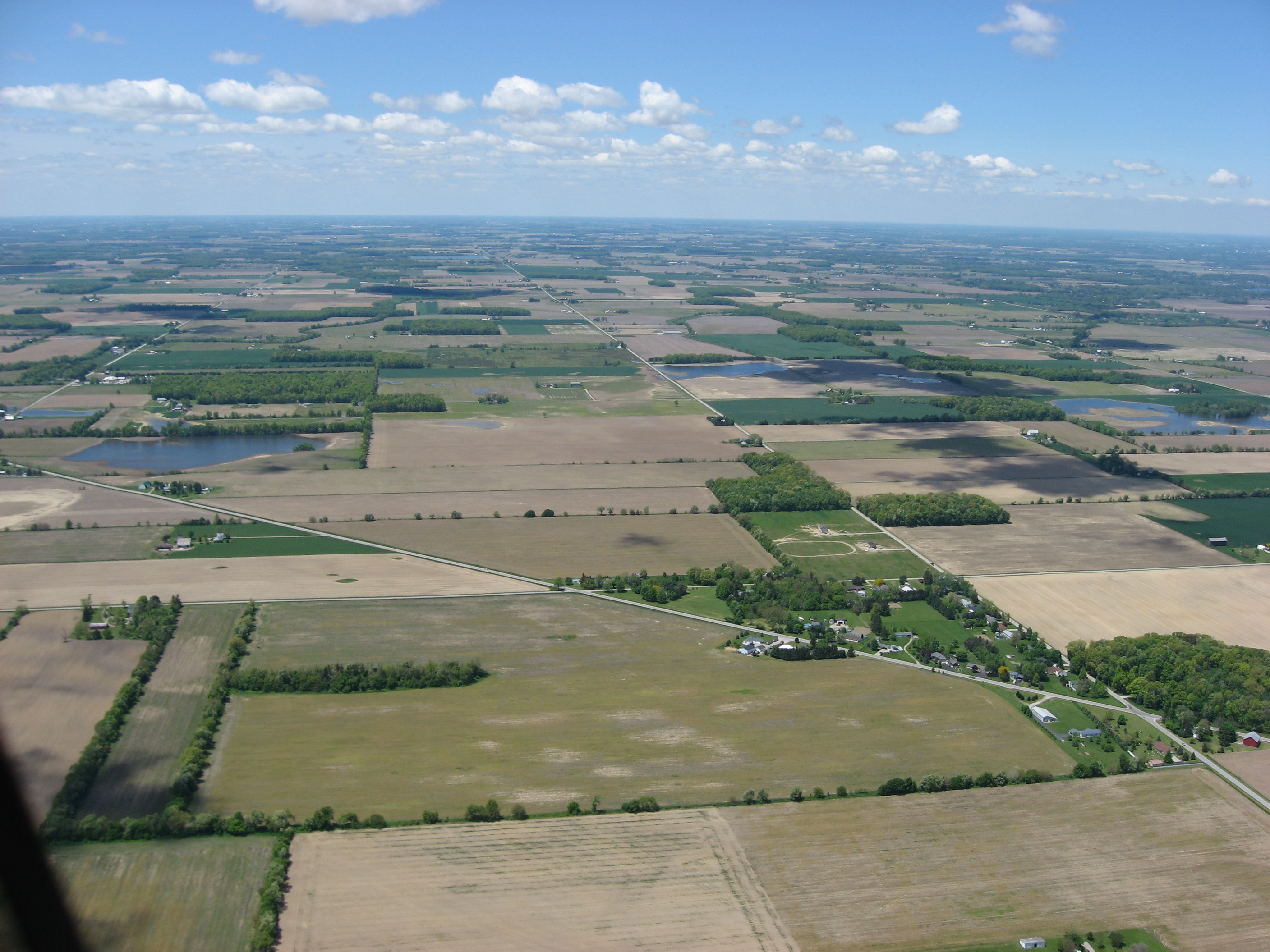
- Countryside south of Bellevue

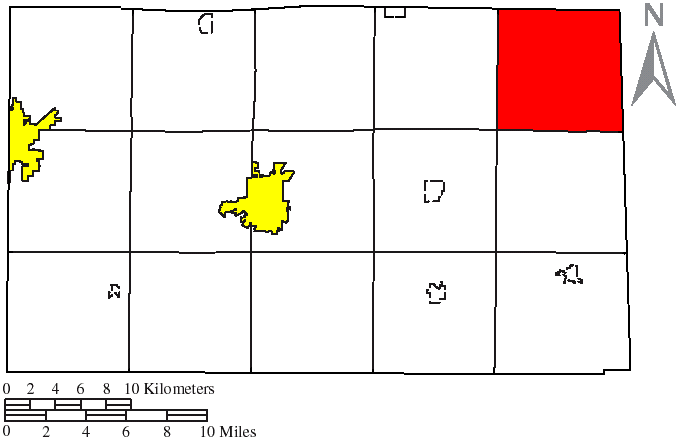
- Location of Thompson Township in Seneca County
- Coordinates: 41°12′17″N 82°53′59″W
- Country: United States
- State: Ohio
- County: Seneca

Area
  - Total: 37.3 sq mi (96.7 km^{2})
  - Land: 37.3 sq mi (96.6 km^{2})
  - Water: 0 sq mi (0.0 km^{2})
- Elevation: 804 ft (245 m)

Population (2020)
  - Total: 1,370
  - Density: 37/sq mi (14.2/km^{2})
- Time zone: UTC-5 (Eastern (EST))
  - Summer (DST): UTC-4 (EDT)
- FIPS code: 39-76632
- GNIS feature ID: 1086955

Thompson Township is one of the fifteen townships of Seneca County, Ohio, United States. The 2020 census found 1,370 people in the township.

== Geography ==
Located in the northeastern corner of the county, it borders the following townships:

- York Township, Sandusky County - north
- Lyme Township, Huron County - northeast
- Sherman Township, Huron County - southeast
- Reed Township - south
- Scipio Township - southwest corner
- Adams Township - west
- Green Creek Township, Sandusky County - northwest corner

No municipalities are located in Thompson Township, although the census-designated place of Flat Rock lies in the northeastern part of the township.

== Name and history ==
Thompson Township was established in 1820.

Statewide, other Thompson Townships are located in Delaware and Geauga counties.

== Government ==
The township is governed by a three-member board of trustees, who are elected in November of odd-numbered years to a four-year term beginning on the following January 1. Two are elected in the year after the presidential election and one is elected in the year before it. There is also an elected township fiscal officer, who serves a four-year term beginning on April 1 of the year after the election, which is held in November of the year before the presidential election. Vacancies in the fiscal officership or on the board of trustees are filled by the remaining trustees.
