= Scipio Township, Seneca County, Ohio =

Township in Ohio, US

- Township
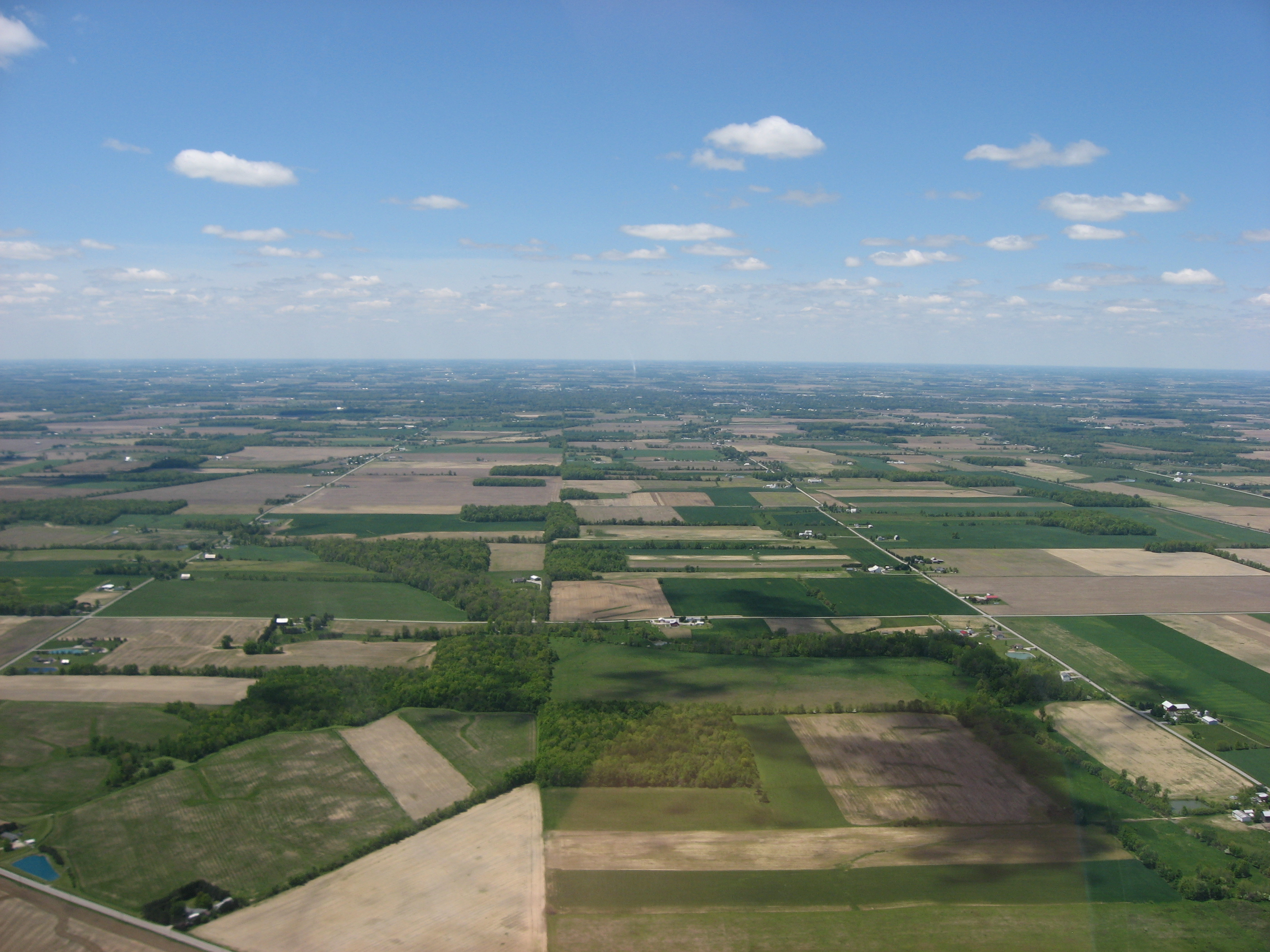
- Countryside southwest of Republic

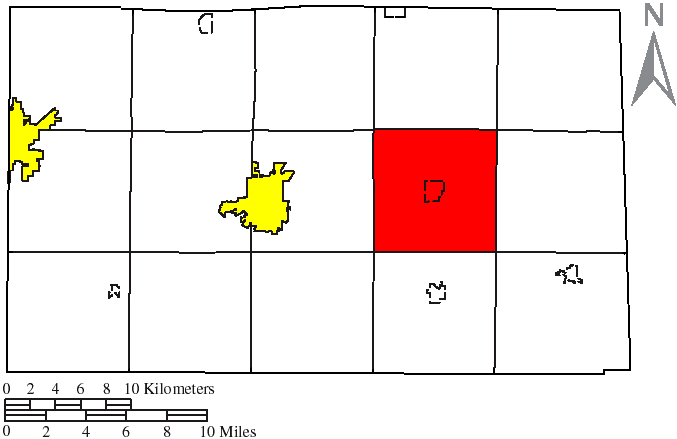
- Location of Scipio Township in Seneca County
- Coordinates: 41°7′27″N 83°1′9″W
- Country: United States
- State: Ohio
- County: Seneca

Area
  - Total: 36.9 sq mi (95.5 km^{2})
  - Land: 36.9 sq mi (95.5 km^{2})
  - Water: 0 sq mi (0.0 km^{2})
- Elevation: 850 ft (259 m)

Population (2020)
  - Total: 1,674
  - Density: 45.4/sq mi (17.5/km^{2})
- Time zone: UTC-5 (Eastern (EST))
  - Summer (DST): UTC-4 (EDT)
- FIPS code: 39-71024
- GNIS feature ID: 1086953

Scipio Township is one of the fifteen townships of Seneca County, Ohio, United States. The 2020 census found 1,674 people in the township.

== Geography ==
Located in the east central part of the county, it borders the following townships:

- Adams Township - north
- Thompson Township - northeast corner
- Reed Township - east
- Venice Township - southeast corner
- Bloom Township - south
- Eden Township - southwest corner
- Clinton Township - west
- Pleasant Township - northwest corner

The village of Republic is located in central Scipio Township.

== Name and history ==
Scipio Township was organized in 1824. It was named after Scipio, New York, the former hometown of many of its early settlers. Statewide, the only other Scipio Township is located in Meigs County.

== Government ==
The township is governed by a three-member board of trustees, who are elected in November of odd-numbered years to a four-year term beginning on the following January 1. Two are elected in the year after the presidential election and one is elected in the year before it. There is also an elected township fiscal officer, who serves a four-year term beginning on April 1 of the year after the election, which is held in November of the year before the presidential election. Vacancies in the fiscal officership or on the board of trustees are filled by the remaining trustees.
