= Adams Township, Seneca County, Ohio =

Township in Ohio, US

- Township
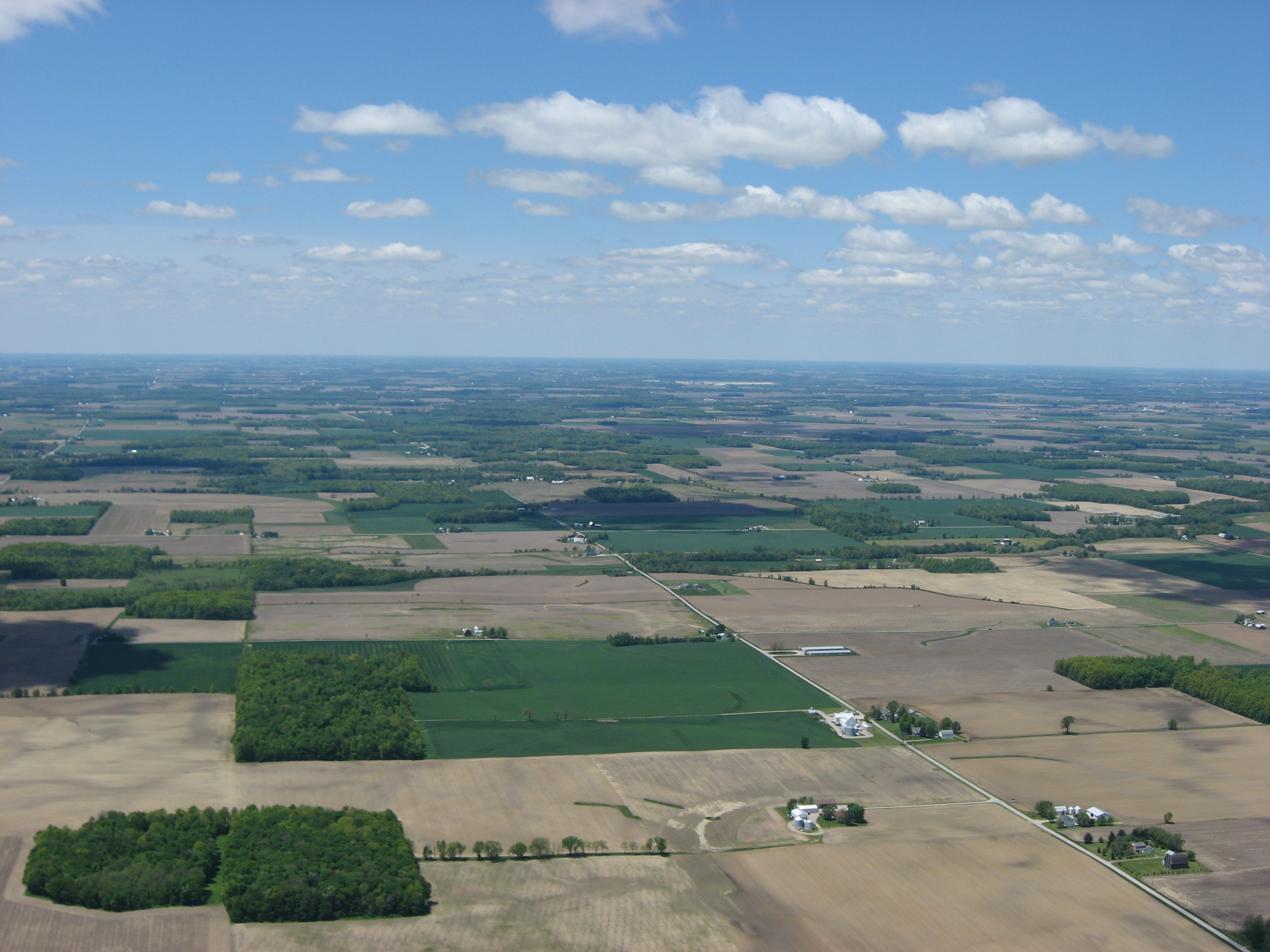
- Countryside in southeastern Adams Township

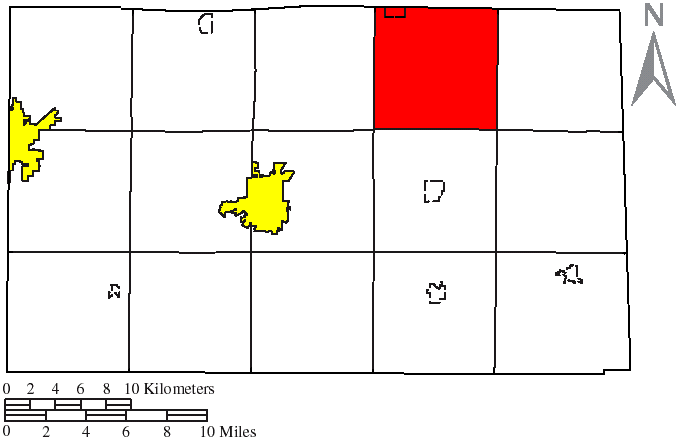
- Location of Adams Township in Seneca County
- Coordinates: 41°12′25″N 83°1′5″W
- Country: United States
- State: Ohio
- County: Seneca

Area
  - Total: 36.2 sq mi (93.7 km^{2})
  - Land: 36.0 sq mi (93.2 km^{2})
  - Water: 0.19 sq mi (0.5 km^{2})
- Elevation: 794 ft (242 m)

Population (2020)
  - Total: 1,247
  - Density: 35/sq mi (13.4/km^{2})
- Time zone: UTC-5 (Eastern (EST))
  - Summer (DST): UTC-4 (EDT)
- FIPS code: 39-00324
- GNIS feature ID: 1086940
- Website: https://adamstwpoh.com/

Adams Township is one of the fifteen townships of Seneca County, Ohio, United States. The 2020 census found 1,247 people in the township.

== Geography ==
Located in the northeastern part of the county, it borders the following townships:

- Green Creek Township, Sandusky County - north
- York Township, Sandusky County - northeast corner
- Thompson Township - east
- Reed Township - southeast corner
- Scipio Township - south
- Clinton Township - southwest corner
- Pleasant Township - west
- Ballville Township, Sandusky County - northwest corner

Part of the village of Green Springs is located in northern Adams Township.

== Name and history ==
Adams Township was organized in 1826. It was named for John Quincy Adams, sixth President of the United States.

It is one of ten Adams Townships statewide.

== Government ==
The township is governed by a three-member board of trustees, who are elected in November of odd-numbered years to a four-year term beginning on the following January 1. Two are elected in the year after the presidential election and one is elected in the year before it. There is also an elected township fiscal officer, who serves a four-year term beginning on April 1 of the year after the election, which is held in November of the year before the presidential election. Vacancies in the fiscal officership or on the board of trustees are filled by the remaining trustees.
