= Springville, Seneca County, Ohio =

Coordinates: 41°00′35″N 83°23′12″W

Springville is an unincorporated community in Big Spring Township, Ohio, United States.

== History ==
Springville was laid out in 1834 on the site of a former Indian village. The community was named for a spring near the original town site. A post office called Springville was established in 1836, and remained in operation until 1847.
