= Iler, Ohio =

Unincorporated community in Ohio, U.S.

Coordinates: 41°11′06″N 83°19′10″W

Iler is an unincorporated community in Seneca County, in the U.S. state of Ohio.

== History ==
Iler had its start in 1885 when the Nickel Plate Railroad was extended to that point. A post office was established at Iler in 1885, and remained in operation until 1923.
