= West Lodi, Ohio =

Coordinates: 41°09′51″N 82°56′18″W

West Lodi is an unincorporated community in Reed Township, Seneca County, Ohio, United States.

== History ==
West Lodi was laid out and platted in 1838. A post office called West Lodi was established in 1843, and remained in operation until 1932.
