= Reed Township, Seneca County, Ohio =

Township in Ohio, US

- Township
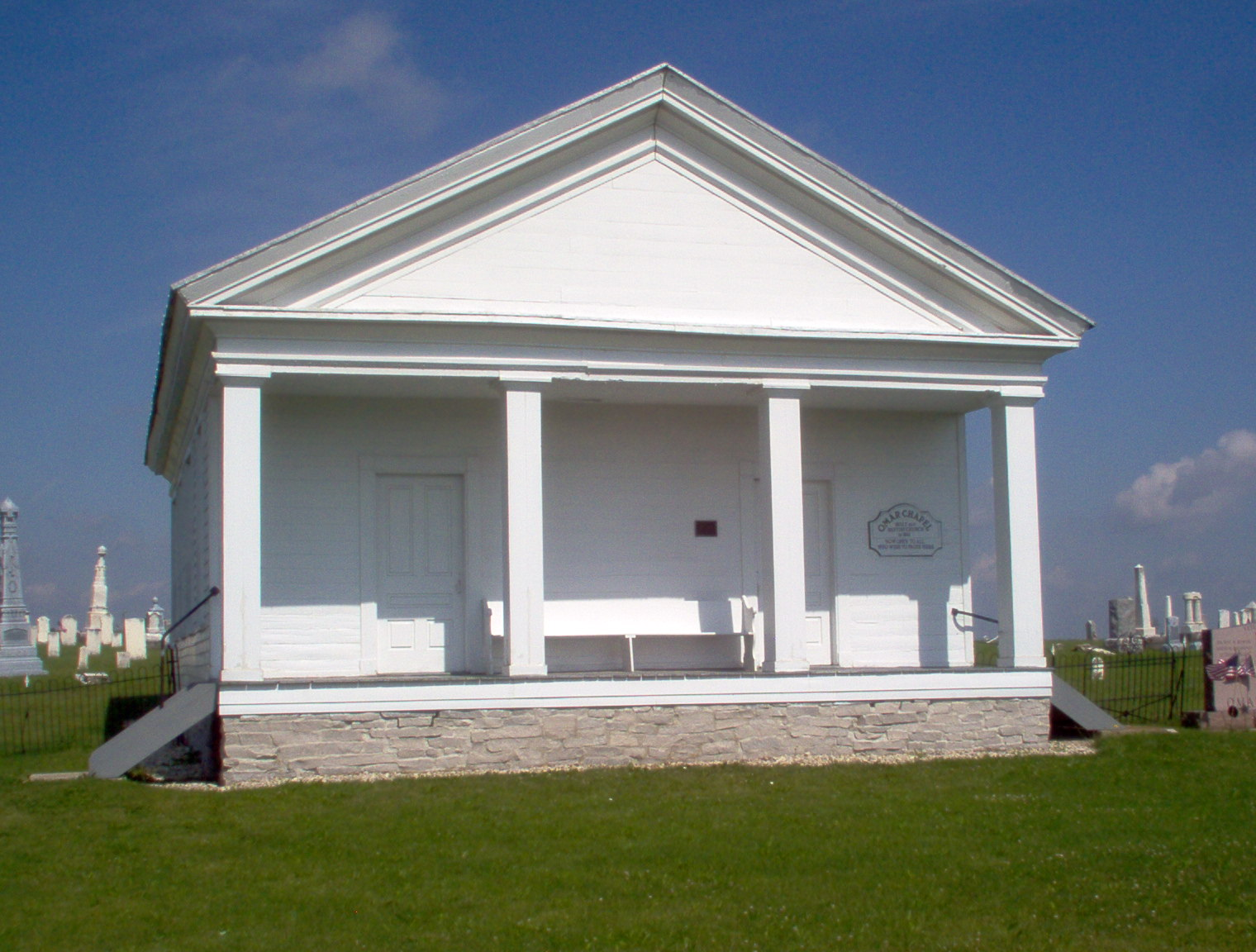
- Omar Chapel

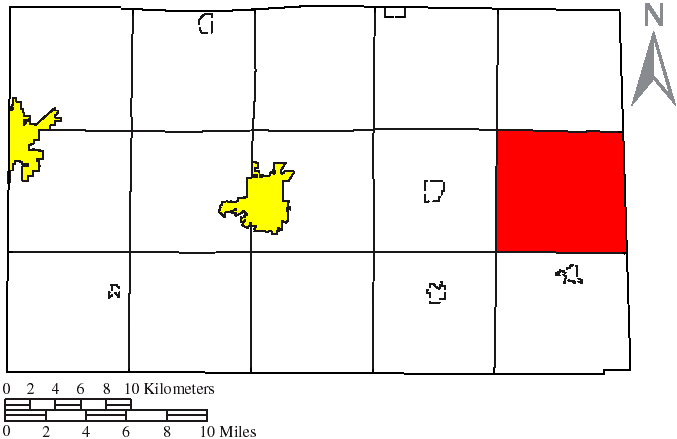
- Location of Reed Township in Seneca County
- Coordinates: 41°7′55″N 82°53′24″W
- Country: United States
- State: Ohio
- County: Seneca

Area
  - Total: 38.5 sq mi (99.7 km^{2})
  - Land: 38.5 sq mi (99.7 km^{2})
  - Water: 0 sq mi (0.0 km^{2})
- Elevation: 899 ft (274 m)

Population (2020)
  - Total: 738
  - Density: 19.2/sq mi (7.40/km^{2})
- Time zone: UTC-5 (Eastern (EST))
  - Summer (DST): UTC-4 (EDT)
- ZIP code: 44807
- Area code: 419
- FIPS code: 39-65942
- GNIS feature ID: 1086952

Reed Township is one of the fifteen townships of Seneca County, Ohio, United States. The 2020 census found 738 people in the township.

== Geography ==
Located in the eastern part of the county, it borders the following townships:

- Thompson Township – north
- Sherman Township, Huron County – northeast
- Norwich Township, Huron County – southeast
- Venice Township – south
- Bloom Township – southwest corner
- Scipio Township – west
- Adams Township – northwest corner

No municipalities are located in Reed Township, but it does contain the unincorporated community of West Lodi.

== Name and history ==
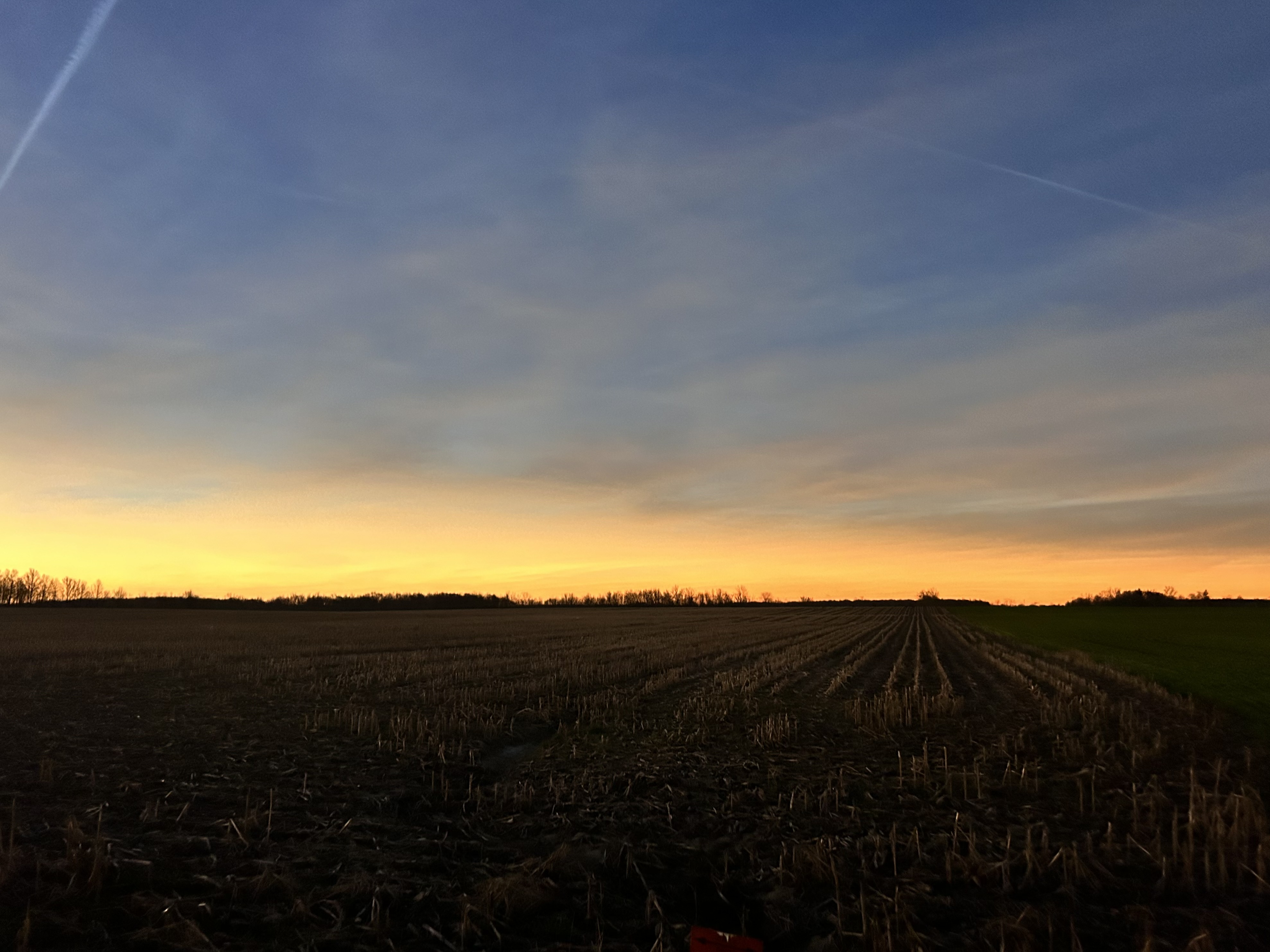
View of a field along SR 162 in Reed Township during totality of the solar eclipse of April 8, 2024.

Reed Township was organized in 1826, and named in honor of Seth Reed (or Seth Read), a pioneer settler. It is the only Reed Township statewide.

Omar Chapel is a historical property in Reed Township which once was a stop on the Underground Railroad. It was completed in 1843 and is listed on the National Register of Historic Places.

== Government ==
The township is governed by a three-member board of trustees, who are elected in November of odd-numbered years to a four-year term beginning on the following January 1. Two are elected in the year after the presidential election and one is elected in the year before it. There is also an elected township fiscal officer, who serves a four-year term beginning on April 1 of the year after the election, which is held in November of the year before the presidential election. Vacancies in the fiscal officership or on the board of trustees are filled by the remaining trustees.
