= Loudon Township, Seneca County, Ohio =

Township in Ohio, US

- Township
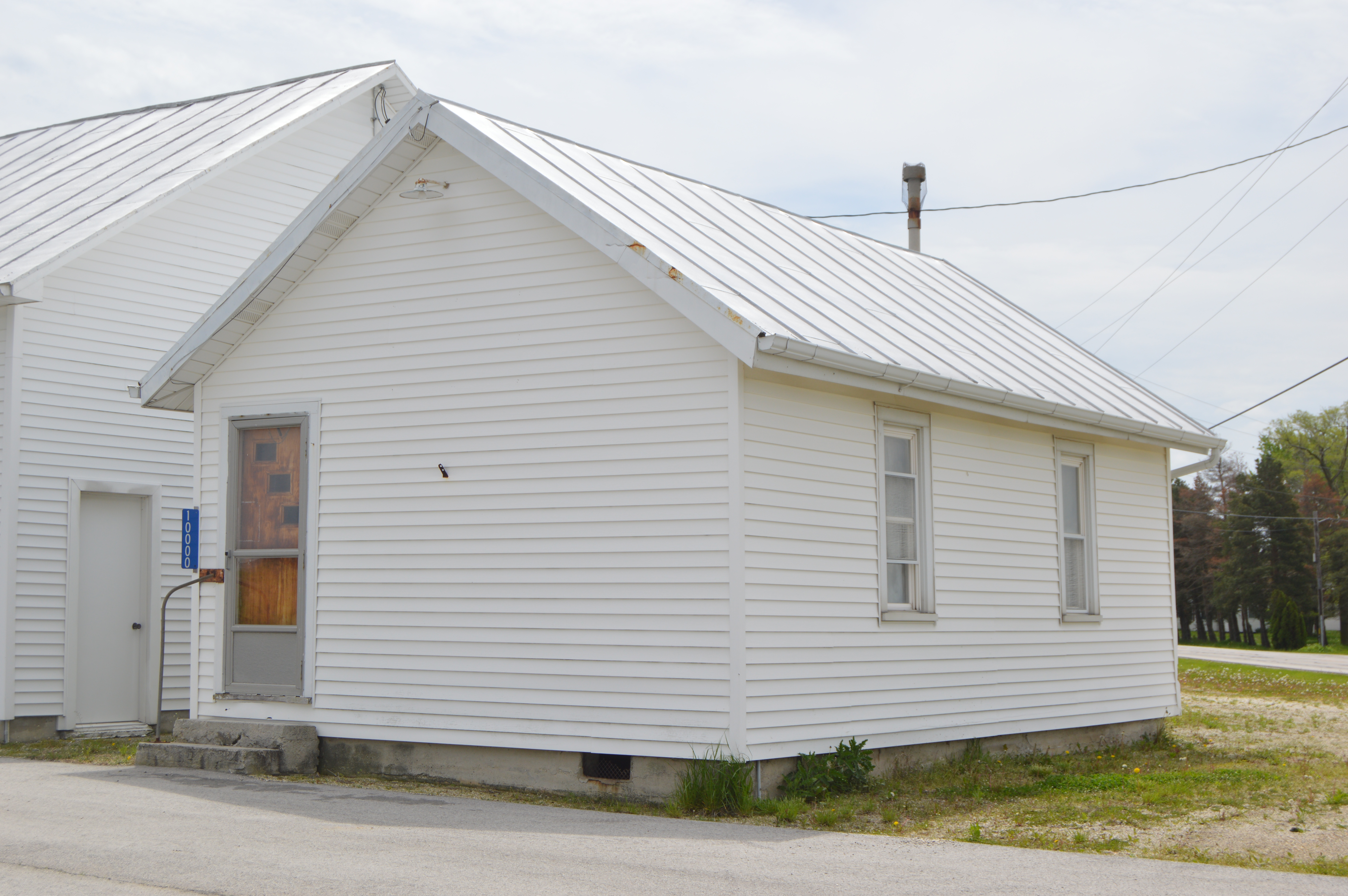
- Township hall

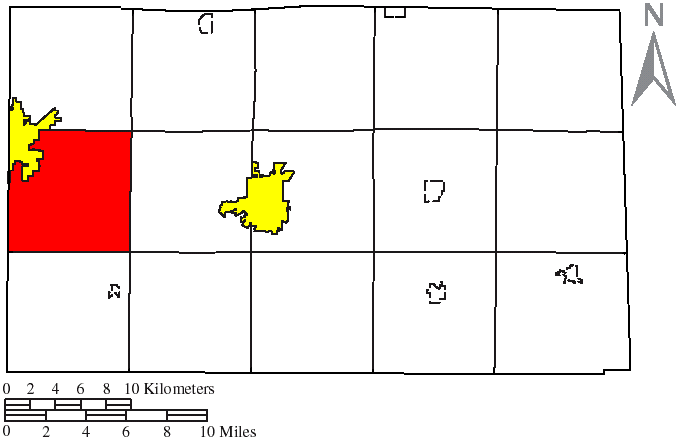
- Location of Loudon Township (red) in Seneca County, adjacent to the city of Fostoria (yellow).
- Coordinates: 41°7′19″N 83°22′21″W
- Country: United States
- State: Ohio
- County: Seneca

Area
  - Total: 33.6 sq mi (87.0 km^{2})
  - Land: 33.6 sq mi (87.0 km^{2})
  - Water: 0 sq mi (0.0 km^{2})
- Elevation: 768 ft (234 m)

Population (2020)
  - Total: 2,246
  - Density: 66.9/sq mi (25.8/km^{2})
- Time zone: UTC-5 (Eastern (EST))
  - Summer (DST): UTC-4 (EDT)
- FIPS code: 39-45052
- GNIS feature ID: 1086950

Loudon Township is one of the fifteen townships of Seneca County, Ohio. There were 2,246 residents of the township at the time of the 2020 census.

== History ==
Loudon Township was organized in 1832.

== Geography ==
Part of the city of Fostoria is located in northwestern Loudon Township.

== Government ==
The township is governed by a three-member board of trustees, who are elected in November of odd-numbered years to a four-year term beginning on the following January 1. Two are elected in the year after the presidential election and one is elected in the year before it.

The township employs an elected township fiscal officer who serves a four-year term beginning on April 1 of the year after the election, which is held in November of the year before the presidential election. Vacancies in the fiscal officership or on the board of trustees are filled by the remaining trustees.
