= Ohio State Route 67 =

State highway in Ohio, US

State Route 67

Route information
- Maintained by ODOT
- Length: 84.78 mi (136.44 km)
- Existed: 1924–present

Major junctions
- West end: US 33 near Wapakoneta
- I-75 near Wapakoneta; US 68 in Kenton; US 23 / US 30 in Upper Sandusky; US 224 near Bloomville
- North end: SR 18 / SR 19 in Republic

Location
- Country: United States
- State: Ohio
- Counties: Auglaize, Hardin, Wyandot, Seneca

Highway system
- Ohio State Highway System; Interstate; US; State; Scenic
← SR 66	→ US 68

State Route 67 (SR 67) is a northeast–southwest state highway in the U.S. state of Ohio. Its western terminus is at an interchange with U.S. Route 33 (US 33) just south of Wapakoneta, which is also the southern terminus for both SR 198 and SR 501, and its northern terminus is at SR 18 and SR 19 in Republic. The portion of the route through Seneca County is signed north-south, whiIe the rest of the route is signed east-west.

== Route description ==
State Route 67 is marked by blue signs at intersections in Wyandot County.

The portion of SR 67 in Wayne Township, Auglaize County, beginning at Santa Fe Line Road, passing into Waynesfield to its merge with SR 196, then leaving Waynesfield and ending at its split from SR 196, is designated as the "Staff Sgt. Sonny Zimmerman Memorial Highway", in honor of a Waynesfield resident and Waynesfield-Goshen High School graduate who was killed in Mushaka, Afghanistan on July 16, 2013, while serving in the Army.

== History ==
- 1924 – Original route established. Originally routed from Wapakoneta to Bellevue along its current alignment and along State Route 18 from Republic to Bellevue.
- 1926 – Truncated at Republic; alignment to Bellevue certified as State Route 18.
- 1961 – Extended 2 miles (3.2 km) south from Wapakoneta (from its terminus at the former alignment of U.S. Route 33) to its current terminus via Auglaize Co. 25-A.

== Major junctions ==
County	Location	mi	km	Destinations	Notes
Auglaize	Wapakoneta	0.00– 0.38	0.00– 0.61	US 33 / SR 198 begins / SR 501 begins / CR 25A (Dixie Highway)	Interchange; southern end of SR 198 / SR 501 concurrency
Auglaize	Wapakoneta	1.18	1.90	SR 198 north / SR 501 north (West Pearl Street) / Willipie Street	Northern end of SR 198 / SR 501 concurrency
Auglaize	Duchouquet Township	3.28– 3.61	5.28– 5.81	I-75 – Dayton, Toledo	Exit 113 (I-75)
Auglaize	Uniopolis	7.98	12.84	SR 65 (Main Street)	
Auglaize	Waynesfield	13.92	22.40	SR 196 north (Westminster Street)	Western end of SR 196 concurrency
Auglaize	Wayne Township	14.88	23.95	SR 196 south – Lakeview	Eastern end of SR 196 concurrency
Auglaize–Hardin county line	Wayne–Roundhead township line	18.94	30.48	SR 117 west / CR 311 (Holden Line Road) / CR 15 – Lima	Western end of SR 117 concurrency
Hardin	Roundhead Township	20.53	33.04	SR 117 east / T-170 – Roundhead	Eastern end of SR 117 concurrency
Hardin	Roundhead Township	21.53	34.65	SR 235 – Ada, Lakeview	
Hardin	Kenton	34.44	55.43	US 68 south (Fontaine Street) / SR 53 north (East Espy Street)	Western end of US 68 concurrency; southern terminus of SR 53
Hardin	Kenton	34.87	56.12	SR 309 (Franklin Street)	
Hardin	Kenton	34.93	56.21	US 68 north (North Detroit Street) / West Columbus Street	Eastern end of US 68 concurrency
Hardin	Kenton	35.00	56.33	SR 31 / SR 53 (Main Street)	
Wyandot	Marseilles Township	47.42	76.32	SR 37 north – Forest	Western end of SR 37 concurrency
Wyandot	Marseilles	47.64	76.67	SR 37 south (Center Street)	Eastern end of SR 37 concurrency
Wyandot	Mifflin Township	50.57	81.38	SR 294 – Harpster	
Wyandot	Upper Sandusky	58.15	93.58	SR 53 south (West Spring Street)	Western end of SR 53 concurrency
Wyandot	Upper Sandusky	58.80	94.63	SR 199 north (Wyandot Avenue) / 8th Street	Western end of SR 199 concurrency
Wyandot	Upper Sandusky	58.97	94.90	SR 199 south (Sandusky Avenue) / Wyandot Avenue	Eastern end of SR 199 concurrency
Wyandot	Upper Sandusky–Crane Township municipal line	61.00– 61.18	98.17– 98.46	US 23 / US 30	Interchange
Wyandot	Upper Sandusky–Crane Township municipal line	61.34	98.72	SR 53 north / CR 47 – Tiffin	Eastern end of SR 53 concurrency
Wyandot	Sycamore–Sycamore Township municipal line	69.59	111.99	SR 103 west (Saffell Avenue) / Kilbourne Street	Western end of SR 103 concurrency
Wyandot	Sycamore	70.01	112.67	SR 103 east / SR 231 south (Saffell Avenue) / Sycamore Avenue	Eastern end of SR 103 concurrency; western end of SR 231 concurrency
Wyandot	Sycamore–Sycamore Township municipal line	70.67	113.73	SR 231 north	Eastern end of SR 231 concurrency
Seneca	Eden Township	75.92	122.18	SR 100 south – Bucyrus	Western end of SR 100 concurrency
Seneca	Eden Township	76.14	122.54	SR 100 north / TR 1068 – Tiffin	Eastern end of SR 100 concurrency
Seneca	Bloom–Scipio township line	81.02	130.39	US 224 – Findlay, Attica	
Seneca	Republic	84.65	136.23	SR 18 west / SR 162 east (Jefferson Street) – Tiffin, North Fairfield	Western end of SR 18 concurrency
Seneca	Republic	84.78	136.44	SR 18 east (Kilbourne Street) / SR 19 (Marion Street) – Bloomville, Green Springs	Eastern end of SR 18 concurrency
1.000 mi = 1.609 km; 1.000 km = 0.621 mi: Concurrency terminus
