= National Register of Historic Places listings in Wyandot County, Ohio =

Location of Wyandot County in Ohio

This is a list of the National Register of Historic Places listings in Wyandot County, Ohio.

This is intended to be a complete list of the properties and districts on the National Register of Historic Places in Wyandot County, Ohio, United States. The locations of National Register properties and districts for which the latitude and longitude coordinates are included below, may be seen in a Google map.

There are 10 properties and districts listed on the National Register in the county.

This National Park Service list is complete through NPS recent listings posted March 14, 2025.

== Current listings ==
	Name on the Register	Image	Date listed	Location	City or town	Description
1	Armstrong Farm	Armstrong Farm	January 17, 1986 (#86000070)	13706 State Route 199; 40°47′48″N 83°15′53″W	Crane Township	
2	Col. Crawford Burn Site Monument	Col. Crawford Burn Site Monument	April 15, 1982 (#82003667)	Northeast of Crawford; 40°55′23″N 83°20′04″W	Crawford Township	1877-built monument, at site of 1782 burning at the stake of Col. Crawford
3	Indian Mill	Indian Mill	November 10, 1970 (#70000525)	3.5 miles northeast of Upper Sandusky on a Crane Township road 40°51′47″N 83°15′15″W	Crane Township	
4	Parker Covered Bridge	Parker Covered Bridge	March 31, 1975 (#75001558)	5 miles northeast of Upper Sandusky on Township Road 40A; 40°54′11″N 83°14′41″W	Crane Township	
5	South Sandusky Avenue Historic District	South Sandusky Avenue Historic District	October 22, 1980 (#80003248)	S. Sandusky Ave. 40°49′18″N 83°16′53″W	Upper Sandusky	
6	Swartz Covered Bridge	Swartz Covered Bridge	October 8, 1976 (#76001553)	Northwest of Wyandot on County Road 130; 40°46′14″N 83°10′09″W	Antrim Township	
7	William Walker Jr. House	William Walker Jr. House	March 11, 1980 (#80003249)	132-134 N. 4th St. 40°49′44″N 83°16′42″W	Upper Sandusky	
8	West End Elementary School	West End Elementary School	November 5, 1987 (#87001989)	200 West St. 40°57′06″N 83°23′13″W	Carey	
9	Wyandot County Courthouse and Jail	Wyandot County Courthouse and Jail	July 2, 1973 (#73001553)	Courthouse Sq. 40°49′37″N 83°16′50″W	Upper Sandusky	
10	Wyandot Mission Church	Wyandot Mission Church	January 20, 1976 (#76001552)	Northern side of Upper Sandusky off Church St. 40°50′10″N 83°16′41″W	Upper Sandusky	

== See also ==
- List of National Historic Landmarks in Ohio
- Listings in neighboring counties: Crawford, Hancock, Hardin, Marion, Seneca
- National Register of Historic Places listings in Ohio
