= Eden Township, Ohio =

Eden Township, Ohio, may refer to:

- Eden Township, Licking County, Ohio
- Eden Township, Seneca County, Ohio
- Eden Township, Wyandot County, Ohio
