= Deunquat, Ohio =

Unincorporated community in Ohio, United States

Coordinates: 40°55′42″N 83°07′53″W

Deunquat is an unincorporated community in Wyandot County, in the U.S. state of Ohio. The community is 3 miles from Sycamore and 2 miles from Benton, and is accessed by C-34 and OH-231.

== History ==
A post office was established at Deunquat in 1830, and remained in operation until 1928. The community was named in honor of Dunquat, a Wyandot chief.
