= Pitt Township =

Pitt Township may refer to:

- Pitt Township, Wyandot County, Ohio
- Pitt Township, Allegheny County, Pennsylvania
