= Sycamore Township, Ohio =

Sycamore Township may refer to:

- Sycamore Township, Hamilton County, Ohio
- Sycamore Township, Wyandot County, Ohio
