= Republic, Ohio =

- Village
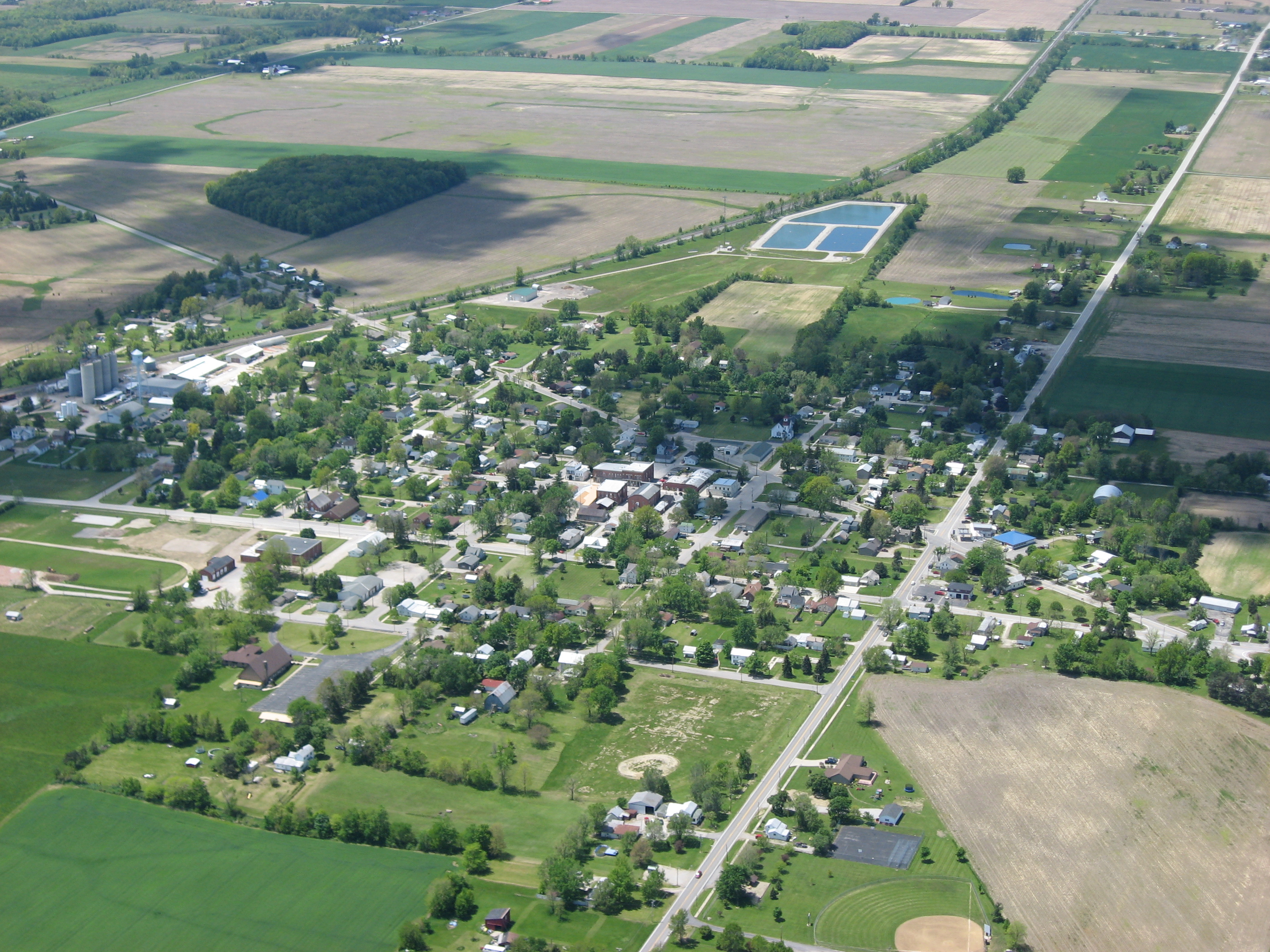
- Aerial view of Republic

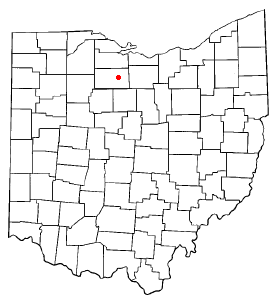
- Location of Republic, Ohio

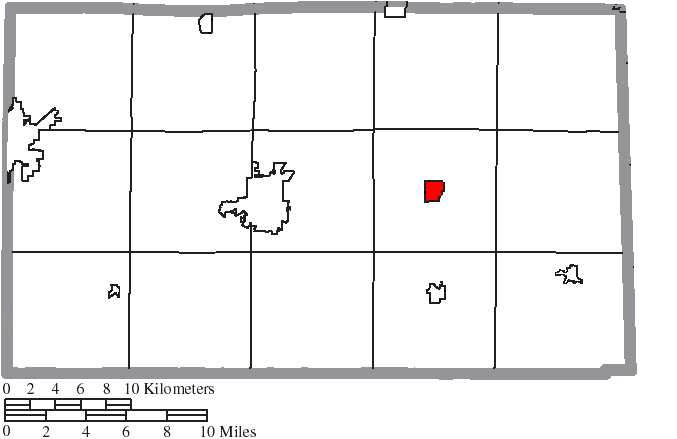
- Location of Republic in Seneca County
- Coordinates: 41°07′22″N 83°01′02″W
- Country: United States
- State: Ohio
- County: Seneca

Government
  - Type: Village council

Area
  - Total: 0.86 sq mi (2.23 km^{2})
  - Land: 0.86 sq mi (2.23 km^{2})
  - Water: 0 sq mi (0.00 km^{2})
- Elevation: 869 ft (265 m)

Population (2020)
  - Total: 556
  - Density: 644.8/sq mi (248.97/km^{2})
- Time zone: UTC-5 (Eastern (EST))
  - Summer (DST): UTC-4 (EDT)
- ZIP code: 44867
- Area code: 419
- FIPS code: 39-66320
- GNIS feature ID: 2399059

Republic is a village in Seneca County, Ohio, United States. The population was 556 at the 2020 census.

== History ==
In 1834, Sidney Smith hired R.M. Shoemaker of Cincinnati to survey a new town at the corners of sections 15, 16, 21, and 22 in Scipio Township. He called it "Republic," though it was known by many early settlers simply as "Scipio Center."

With the arrival of a rail line from Sandusky in 1841, Republic became a popular trading center. Stores, warehouses, shops, and factories sprang up almost overnight. A second rail line was contemplated to run between Republic and Melmore in Eden Township.

When the old Seneca County courthouse at Tiffin burned on May 21, 1841, efforts were made to designate Republic as the county seat, but these were unsuccessful. Republic's fortunes began to decline when the new Cincinnati, Sandusky & Cleveland Railroad bypassed it to make a straight run to Tiffin.

The town was stimulated by the construction of the Baltimore and Ohio Railroad. The railroad passes via an arch bridge over what is now State Route 19. On January 4, 1887, just west of town on the railroad was the site of an accident designated the "Republic Horror" when the westbound B & O Express No. 5 collided head on with a stalled eastbound freight train.

Republic's motto is "Small in Size, Big in Heart." Written by Seneca East student Michelle Wheatley, it was selected in a contest of popular submissions.

== Geography ==
According to the United States Census Bureau, the village has a total area of 0.86 square miles (2.23 km^{2}), all land.

== Demographics ==
Historical population
Census	Pop.	Note	%±
1850	917		—
1860	636		−30.6%
1870	481		−24.4%
1880	715		48.6%
1890	584		−18.3%
1900	656		12.3%
1910	475		−27.6%
1920	393		−17.3%
1930	512		30.3%
1940	546		6.6%
1950	615		12.6%
1960	729		18.5%
1970	705		−3.3%
1980	656		−7.0%
1990	611		−6.9%
2000	614		0.5%
2010	549		−10.6%
2020	556		1.3%
U.S. Decennial Census

=== 2010 census ===
As of the census of 2010, there were 549 people, 220 households, and 151 families living in the village. The population density was 638.4 inhabitants per square mile (246.5/km^{2}). There were 245 housing units at an average density of 284.9 per square mile (110.0/km^{2}). The racial makeup of the village was 98.2% White, 0.4% African American, 0.5% Native American, 0.2% Asian, and 0.7% from two or more races. Hispanic or Latino of any race were 1.8% of the population.

There were 220 households, of which 35.9% had children under the age of 18 living with them, 47.7% were married couples living together, 14.1% had a female householder with no husband present, 6.8% had a male householder with no wife present, and 31.4% were non-families. 25.9% of all households were made up of individuals, and 13.1% had someone living alone who was 65 years of age or older. The average household size was 2.50 and the average family size was 2.93.

The median age in the village was 35.5 years. 25.9% of residents were under the age of 18; 7.4% were between the ages of 18 and 24; 29.1% were from 25 to 44; 26.2% were from 45 to 64; and 11.3% were 65 years of age or older. The gender makeup of the village was 50.1% male and 49.9% female.

=== 2000 census ===
As of the census of 2000, there were 614 people, 223 households, and 165 families living in the village. The population density was 711.4 inhabitants per square mile (274.7/km^{2}). There were 237 housing units at an average density of 274.6 per square mile (106.0/km^{2}). The racial makeup of the village was 99.67% White, 0.33% from other races. Hispanic or Latino of any race were 1.79% of the population.

There were 223 households, out of which 39.0% had children under the age of 18 living with them, 58.3% were married couples living together, 10.3% had a female householder with no husband present, and 26.0% were non-families. 22.9% of all households were made up of individuals, and 9.4% had someone living alone who was 65 years of age or older. The average household size was 2.72 and the average family size was 3.19.

In the village, the population was spread out, with 29.6% under the age of 18, 9.4% from 18 to 24, 28.7% from 25 to 44, 19.1% from 45 to 64, and 13.2% who were 65 years of age or older. The median age was 33 years. For every 100 females there were 101.3 males. For every 100 females age 18 and over, there were 99.1 males.

The median income for a household in the village was $37,813, and the median income for a family was $45,083. Males had a median income of $32,813 versus $20,956 for females. The per capita income for the village was $14,875. About 7.5% of families and 7.6% of the population were below the poverty line, including 6.9% of those under age 18 and 3.7% of those age 65 or over.
