= Ridge Township, Ohio =

Ridge Township, Ohio, may refer to:

- Ridge Township, Van Wert County, Ohio
- Ridge Township, Wyandot County, Ohio
