= Mononcue, Ohio =

Unincorporated community in Ohio, United States

Mononcue
- Unincorporated community
- Location within the state of Ohio
- Coordinates: 40°49′38″N 83°17′7″W
- Country: United States
- State: Ohio
- County: Wyandot
- Elevation: 820 ft (250 m)
- Time zone: UTC-5 (Eastern (EST))
  - Summer (DST): UTC-4 (EDT)
- GNIS feature ID: 1048982

Mononcue is an unincorporated community in Wyandot County, in the U.S. state of Ohio.
