= Ohio State Route 199 =

State highway in northwestern Ohio, US

State Route 199

Route information
- Maintained by ODOT
- Length: 62.160 mi (100.037 km)
- Existed: 1924–present

Major junctions
- South end: US 23 / CR 61 near Upper Sandusky
- US 23 / US 30 in Upper Sandusky; US 224 near Fostoria; US 6 near Bowling Green
- North end: US 20 / SR 795 in Perrysburg

Location
- Country: United States
- State: Ohio
- Counties: Wyandot, Seneca, Wood

Highway system
- Ohio State Highway System; Interstate; US; State; Scenic
| ← SR 198 | → SR 200 |

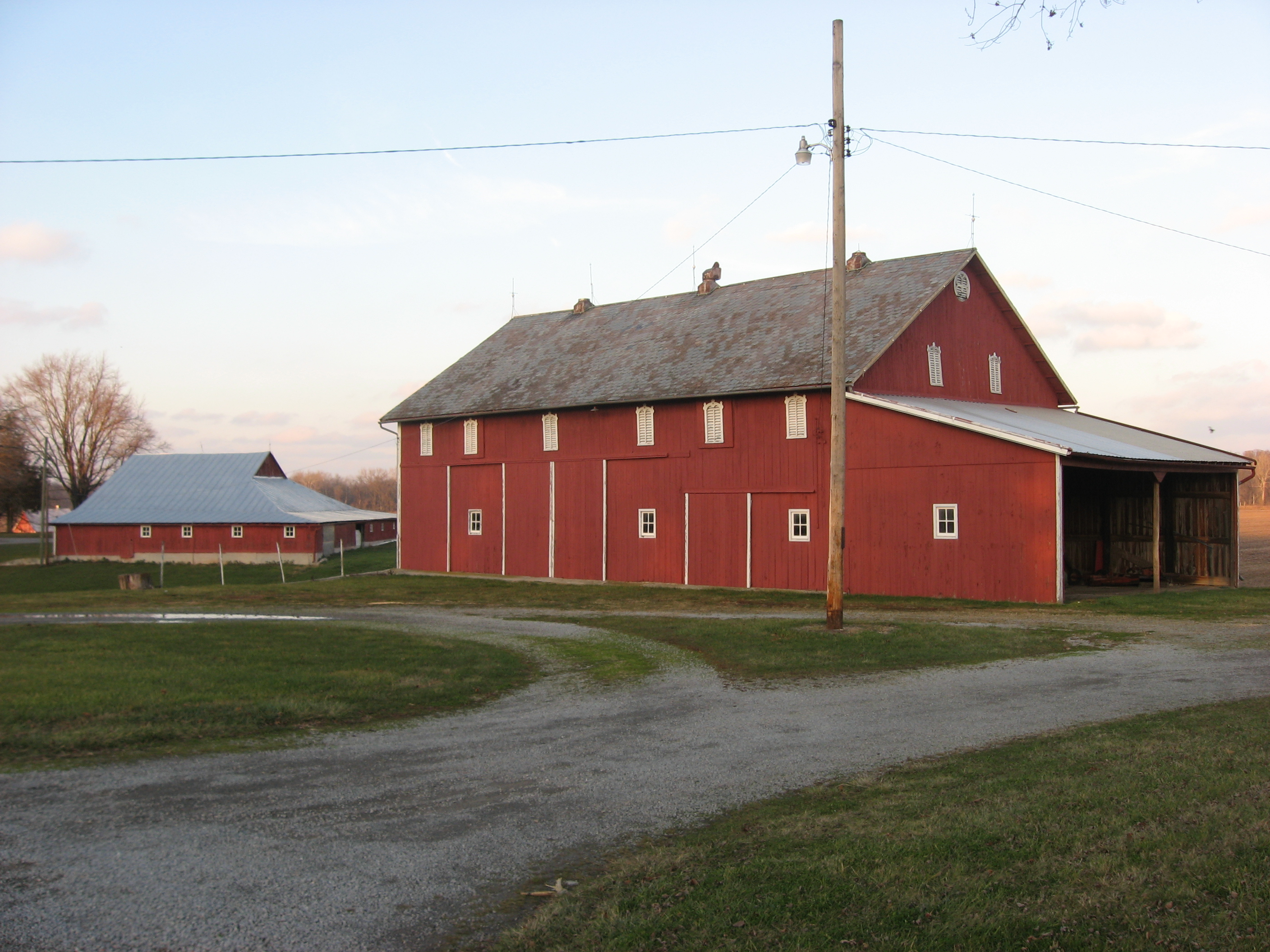
Barns at the Armstrong Farm along the highway near Upper Sandusky

Ohio State Route 199 (SR 199) is a north-south highway in northwest Ohio. Its southern terminus is at an interchange with US 23 just south of Upper Sandusky, and its northern terminus is at US 20 and SR 795 in Perrysburg.

The route begins northerly into Upper Sandusky, and then on to Carey, where it joins US 23. The two routes run concurrently from Carey to Fostoria. From there, SR 199 continues to West Millgrove and to US 6, whose route it joins for a mile (1.6 km) as it crosses the Portage River. The route then continues north to Perrysburg. It passes over I-75 south of Perrysburg, but does not have an interchange with it.

== History ==
Most of SR 199 was formerly the route of US 23. Before 1966, SR 199 was truncated at the south in Fostoria, followed most of the current route of US 23, and was truncated at the north just east of Toledo, Ohio. In 1966, SR 199 was extended along its current route to Upper Sandusky along US 23's current route from Fostoria to Carey and its old route from Carey to Upper Sandusky. In 1969, it switched routes with US 23 from Fostoria to Perrysburg.

== Major intersections ==
| County | Location | mi | km | Destinations | Notes |
|---|---|---|---|---|---|
| Wyandot | Pitt Township | 0.000 | 0.000 | US 23 / CR 61 – Marion, Carey | Interchange |
| Wyandot | Upper Sandusky | 4.342 | 6.988 | SR 53 east / SR 67 north (Sandusky Avenue) / Wyandot Avenue | Southern end of SR 53 / SR 67 concurrency |
| Wyandot | Upper Sandusky | 4.506 | 7.252 | SR 53 west / SR 67 south (8th Street) | Northern end of SR 53 / SR 67 concurrency |
| Wyandot | Upper Sandusky | 7.053– 7.160 | 11.351– 11.523 | US 23 / US 30 to I-75 – Marion | Interchange |
| Wyandot | Carey | 14.218 | 22.882 | SR 103 east – Sycamore | Southern end of SR 103 concurrency |
| Wyandot | Carey | 15.401 | 24.786 | US 23 south / SR 103 west (Vance Street) / SR 568 west (Findlay Street) | Northern end of SR 103 concurrency; southern end of US 23 concurrency; eastern terminus of SR 568 |
| Seneca | Loudon Township | 24.781 | 39.881 | US 224 – Findlay, Tiffin | |
| Seneca | Fostoria | 29.579– 29.588 | 47.603– 47.617 | SR 18 east (East Lytle Street) | Southern end of SR 18 concurrency |
| Seneca | Fostoria | 30.093 | 48.430 | SR 12 west (West Lytle Street) | Southern end of SR 12 concurrency |
| Seneca | Fostoria | 30.394– 30.465 | 48.914– 49.029 | SR 12 east (East South Street) | Northern end of SR 12 concurrency |
| Seneca–Hancock county line | Fostoria | 30.918 | 49.758 | SR 18 west / SR 613 west (West North Street) | Northern end of SR 18 concurrency; eastern terminus of SR 613 |
| Seneca–Wood county line | Fostoria | 31.840 | 51.242 | US 23 north (North County Line Street) | Northern end of US 23 concurrency |
| Wood | Montgomery Township | 40.953 | 65.907 | SR 281 (Defiance Pike) – Defiance, Wayne, Bradner | Roundabout |
| Wood | Freedom Township | 46.313 | 74.534 | US 6 east – Fremont | Southern end of US 6 concurrency |
| Wood | Freedom Township | 47.284 | 76.096 | US 6 west – Bowling Green | Northern end of US 6 concurrency |
| Wood | Webster Township | 50.188 | 80.770 | SR 105 – Bowling Green, Pemberville | |
| Wood | Webster Township | 54.420 | 87.581 | SR 582 – Haskins, Luckey, Woodville | |
| Wood | Perrysburg | 62.160 | 100.037 | US 20 (Louisiana Avenue) / SR 795 east (Indiana Avenue) | Western terminus of SR 795 |
1.000 mi = 1.609 km; 1.000 km = 0.621 mi: Concurrency terminus
