= Armstrong Farm (Crane Township, Wyandot County, Ohio) =

- U.S. National Register of Historic Places
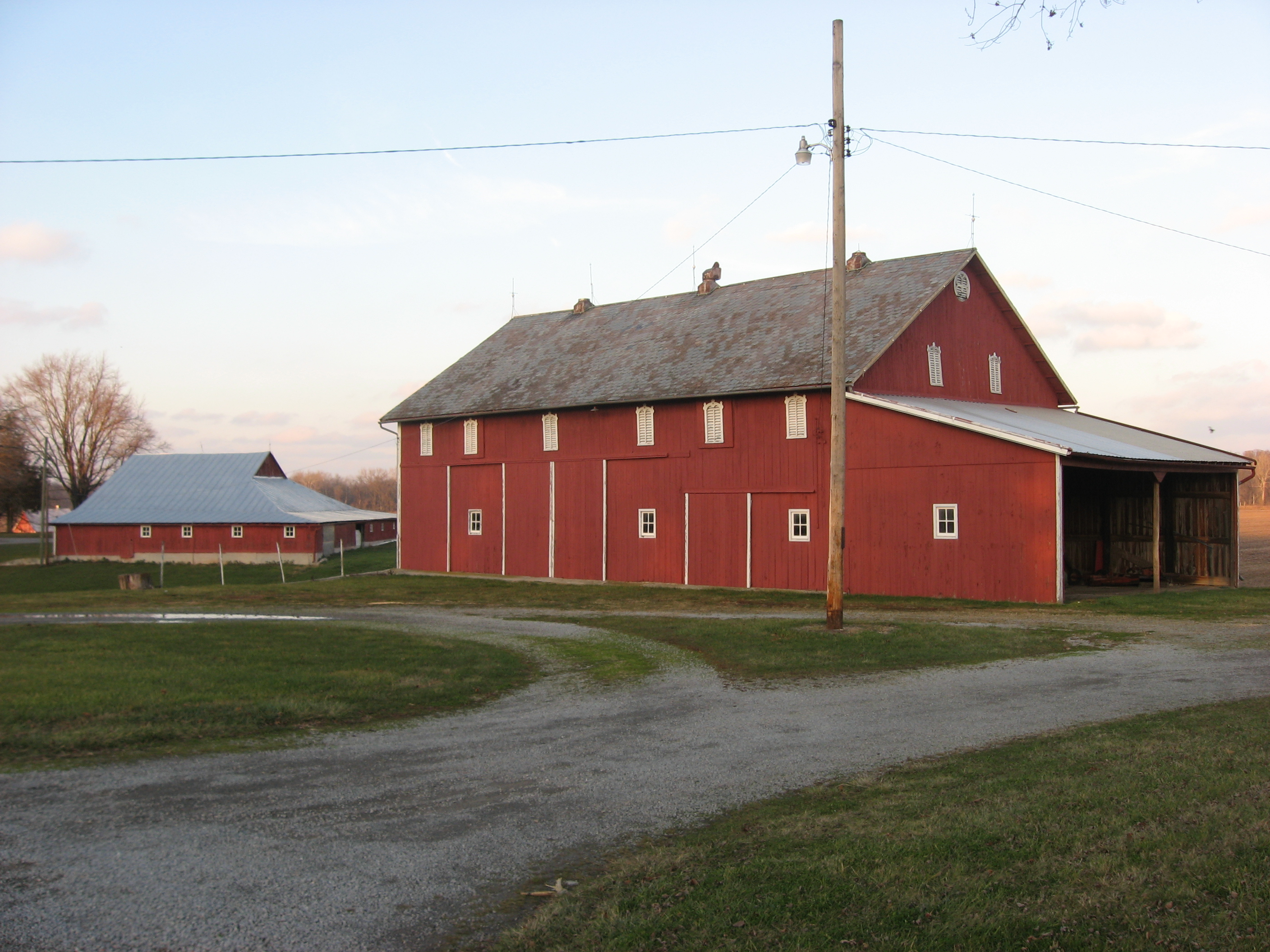
- Barns at the Armstrong Farm

- Location within Ohio Location within the United States
- Location: 13706 State Route 199, Crane Township, Wyandot County, Ohio
- Nearest city: Upper Sandusky
- Coordinates: 40°47′48″N 83°15′53″W
- Area: 536.8 acres (217.2 ha)
- Built: 1830
- NRHP reference No.: 86000070
- Added to NRHP: January 17, 1986

The Armstrong Farm, also known as the Reber Farm, is a historic farm complex near Upper Sandusky in Crane Township, Wyandot County, Ohio, United States. Known for its association with Thomas V. Reber, a longtime president of the Wyandot County Agricultural Society, it was built in 1830.

The farmhouse, which is the central building on the farmstead, is a vernacular structure built of brick with a gabled roof of shingles. The original foundation, constructed of dry stone, has been shored up by modern concrete, although the original foundation is still visible at certain points. Among the other buildings on the property are a small summer kitchen and two garages, located just south and west of the house.

When the Armstrong Farm was founded, significant numbers of Wyandots still lived on a reservation in the vicinity of Upper Sandusky; the farm's early inhabitants were distinguished by their relations with the Wyandots.

In 1986, the Armstrong Farm was listed on the National Register of Historic Places. It qualified for inclusion because of its place in local history, because of its connection to the leading Reber and Armstrong families, and because of its unusually well-preserved historic architecture.
