= Salem Township, Wyandot County, Ohio =

Township in Ohio, US

- Township
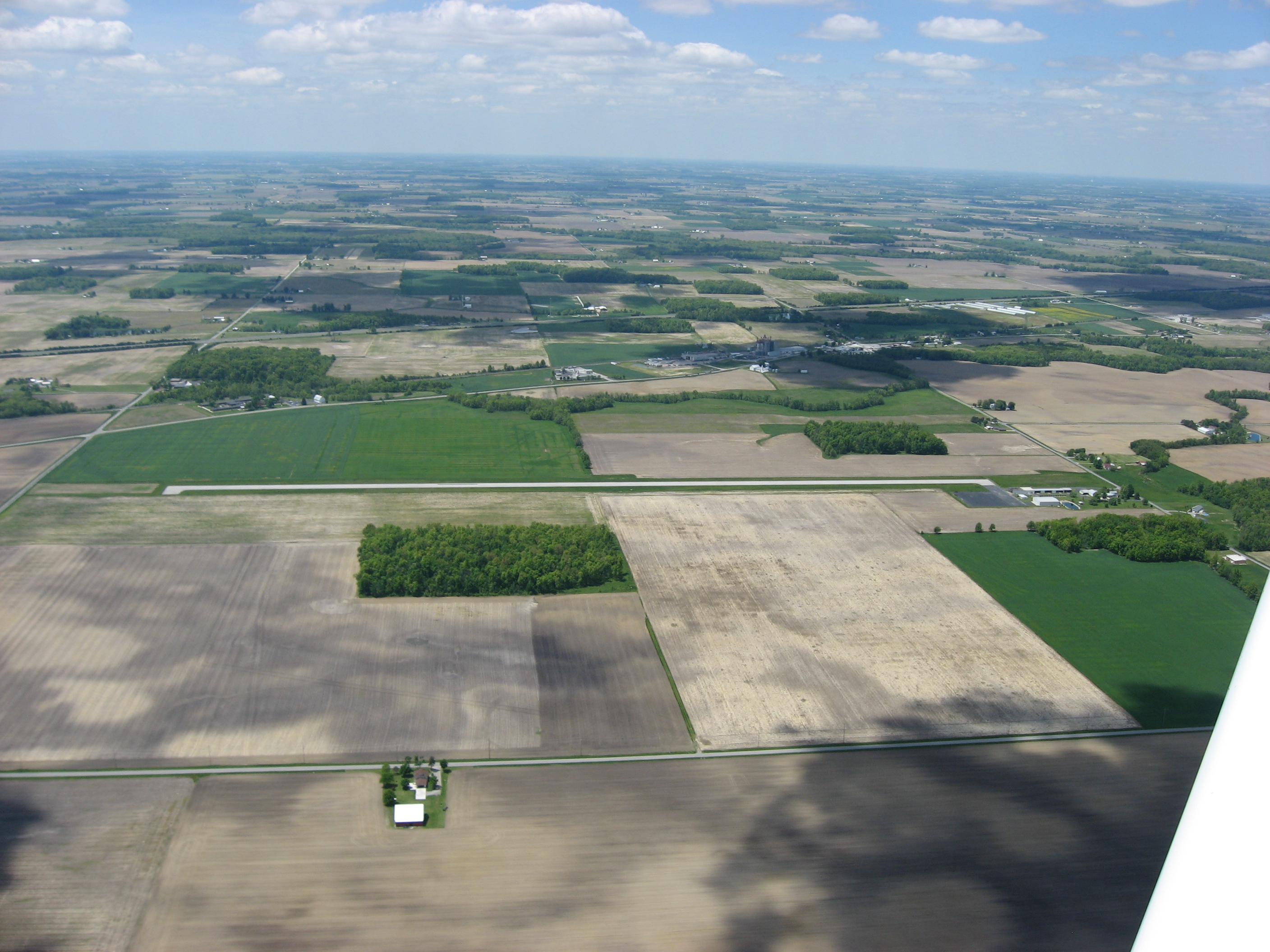
- Wyandot Airport between Carey and Upper Sandusky

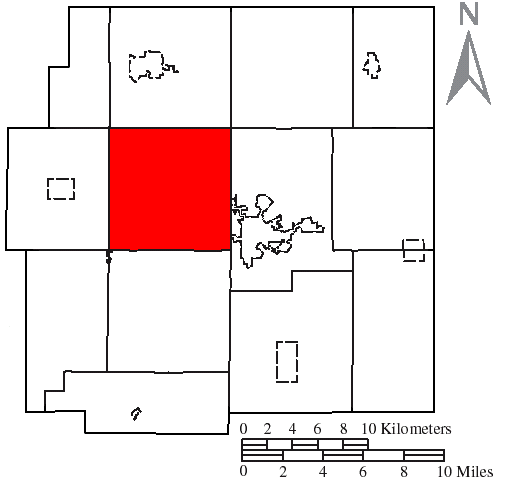
- Location of Salem Township in Wyandot County
- Coordinates: 40°52′8″N 83°21′8″W
- Country: United States
- State: Ohio
- County: Wyandot

Area
  - Total: 36.4 sq mi (94.3 km^{2})
  - Land: 36.4 sq mi (94.2 km^{2})
  - Water: 0.039 sq mi (0.1 km^{2})
- Elevation: 840 ft (256 m)

Population (2020)
  - Total: 981
  - Density: 27.0/sq mi (10.4/km^{2})
- Time zone: UTC-5 (Eastern (EST))
  - Summer (DST): UTC-4 (EDT)
- FIPS code: 39-70016
- GNIS feature ID: 1087212

Salem Township is one of the thirteen townships of Wyandot County, Ohio, United States. The 2020 census found 981 people in the township.

== Geography ==
Located in the western part of the county, it borders the following townships:

- Crawford Township - north
- Tymochtee Township - northeast corner
- Crane Township - east
- Mifflin Township - south
- Jackson Township - southwest corner
- Richland Township - west
- Ridge Township - northwest corner

No municipalities are located in Salem Township.

== Name and history ==
It is one of fourteen Salem Townships statewide.

A 12 megawatt (MW) Wyandot Solar Facility solar photovoltaic power plant was completed in Salem Township in April 2010.

== Government ==
The township is governed by a three-member board of trustees, who are elected in November of odd-numbered years to a four-year term beginning on the following January 1. Two are elected in the year after the presidential election and one is elected in the year before it. There is also an elected township fiscal officer, who serves a four-year term beginning on April 1 of the year after the election, which is held in November of the year before the presidential election. Vacancies in the fiscal officership or on the board of trustees are filled by the remaining trustees.
