= Tymochtee Township, Wyandot County, Ohio =

Township in Ohio, US

- Township
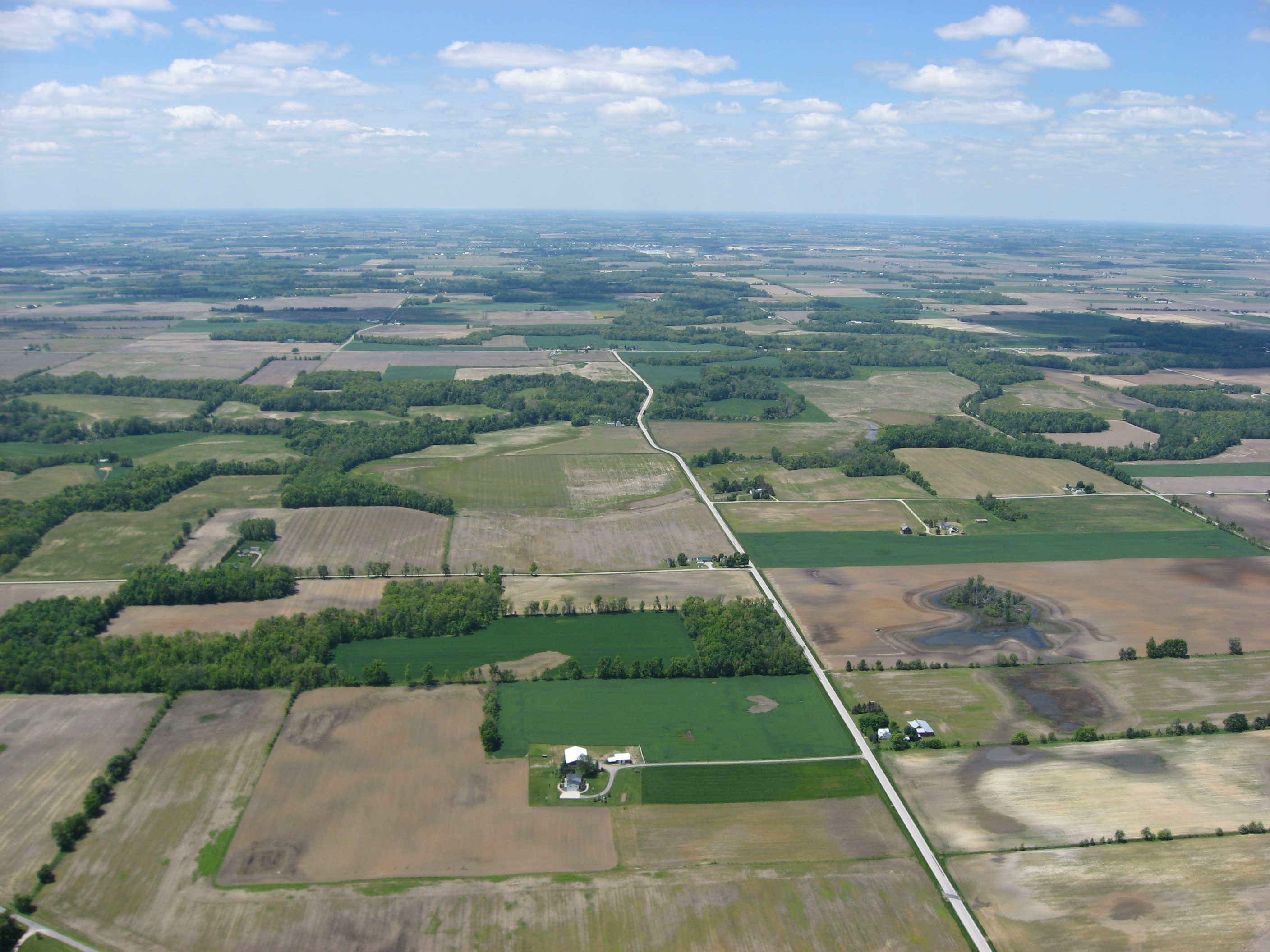
- Countryside south of McCutchenville

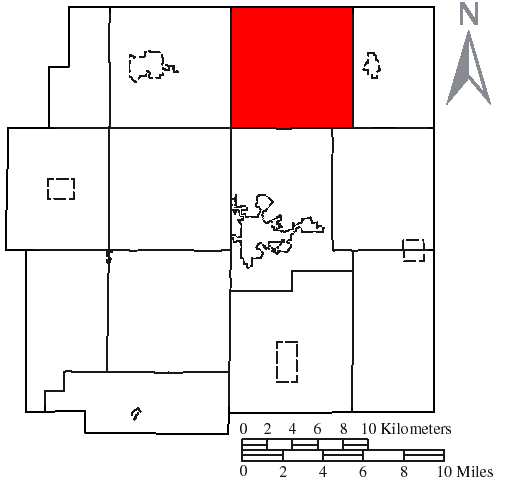
- Location of Tymochtee Township in Wyandot County
- Coordinates: 40°57′10″N 83°14′6″W
- Country: United States
- State: Ohio
- County: Wyandot

Area
  - Total: 36.2 sq mi (93.8 km^{2})
  - Land: 36.2 sq mi (93.7 km^{2})
  - Water: 0.039 sq mi (0.1 km^{2})
- Elevation: 778 ft (237 m)

Population (2020)
  - Total: 1,086
  - Density: 30.0/sq mi (11.6/km^{2})
- Time zone: UTC-5 (Eastern (EST))
  - Summer (DST): UTC-4 (EDT)
- FIPS code: 39-78141
- GNIS feature ID: 1087214

Tymochtee Township is one of the thirteen townships of Wyandot County, Ohio, United States. The 2020 census found 1,086 people in the township.

== Geography ==
Located in the northern part of the county, it borders the following townships:

- Seneca Township, Seneca County - north
- Eden Township, Seneca County - northeast corner
- Sycamore Township - east
- Eden Township - southeast
- Crane Township - south
- Salem Township - southwest corner
- Crawford Township - west
- Big Spring Township, Seneca County - northwest corner

No municipalities are located in Tymochtee Township, although the unincorporated communities of McCutchenville and Mexico are located in the northern and northeastern parts of the township respectively.

== Name and history ==
It is the only Tymochtee Township statewide.

== Government ==
The township is governed by a three-member board of trustees, who are elected in November of odd-numbered years to a four-year term beginning on the following January 1. Two are elected in the year after the presidential election and one is elected in the year before it. There is also an elected township fiscal officer, who serves a four-year term beginning on April 1 of the year after the election, which is held in November of the year before the presidential election. Vacancies in the fiscal officership or on the board of trustees are filled by the remaining trustees.
