= Lovell, Ohio =

Unincorporated community in Ohio, United States

Coordinates: 40°53′26″N 83°19′54″W

Lovell is an unincorporated community in Wyandot County, in the U.S. state of Ohio.

== History ==
Lovell had its start in the 1870s soon after the railroad was extended to that point. A post office was established at Lovell in 1877, and remained in operation until 1909. The community was named for its founder, Lovell B. Harris.
