= Belle Vernon, Ohio =

Unincorporated community in Ohio, United States

Coordinates: 40°55′35″N 83°12′07″W

Belle Vernon is an unincorporated community in Wyandot County, in the U.S. state of Ohio.

== History ==
Settlement was made at Belle Vernon in 1842. A post office was established at Belle Vernon in 1842, and remained in operation until 1902.
