= Richland Township, Wyandot County, Ohio =

Township in Ohio, US

- Township
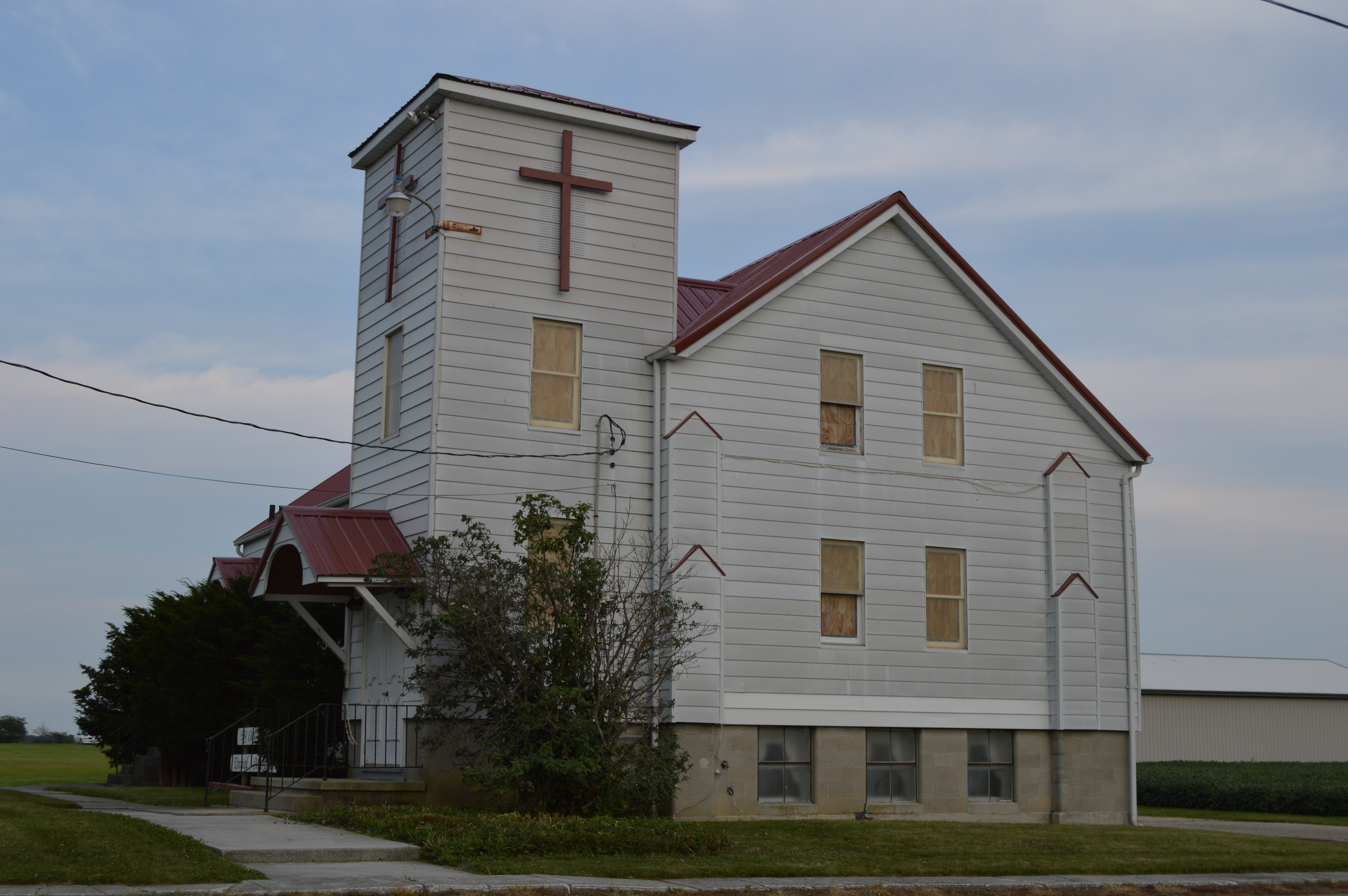
- Big Oak Methodist Church on County Road 330

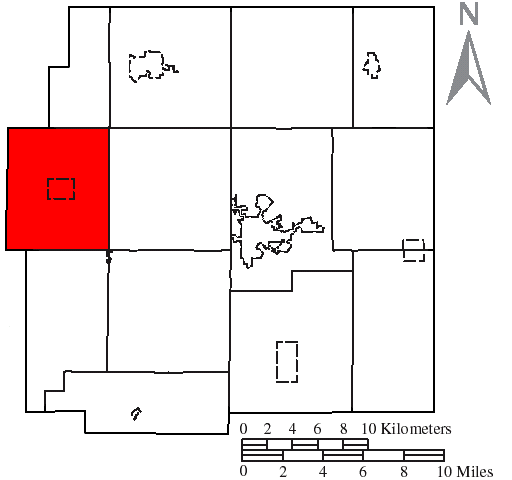
- Location of Richland Township in Wyandot County
- Coordinates: 40°51′42″N 83°28′28″W
- Country: United States
- State: Ohio
- County: Wyandot

Area
  - Total: 30.3 sq mi (78.6 km^{2})
  - Land: 30.3 sq mi (78.6 km^{2})
  - Water: 0 sq mi (0.0 km^{2})
- Elevation: 876 ft (267 m)

Population (2020)
  - Total: 846
  - Density: 27.9/sq mi (10.8/km^{2})
- Time zone: UTC-5 (Eastern (EST))
  - Summer (DST): UTC-4 (EDT)
- FIPS code: 39-66782
- GNIS feature ID: 1087210

Richland Township is one of the thirteen townships of Wyandot County, Ohio, United States. The 2020 census found 846 people in the township, 328 of whom lived in the village of Wharton.

== Geography ==
Located in the western part of the county, it borders the following townships:

- Ridge Township - north
- Crawford Township - northeast corner
- Salem Township - east
- Mifflin Township - southeast corner
- Jackson Township - south
- Jackson Township, Hardin County - southwest
- Delaware Township, Hancock County - west
- Amanda Township, Hancock County - northwest

Two villages are located in Richland Township: Wharton in the center, and part of Forest in the southwest along the border with Hardin County.

== Name and history ==
It is one of twelve Richland Townships statewide.

== Government ==
The township is governed by a three-member board of trustees, who are elected in November of odd-numbered years to a four-year term beginning on the following January 1. Two are elected in the year after the presidential election and one is elected in the year before it. There is also an elected township fiscal officer, who serves a four-year term beginning on April 1 of the year after the election, which is held in November of the year before the presidential election. Vacancies in the fiscal officership or on the board of trustees are filled by the remaining trustees.
