= Melmore, Ohio =

- Census-designated place
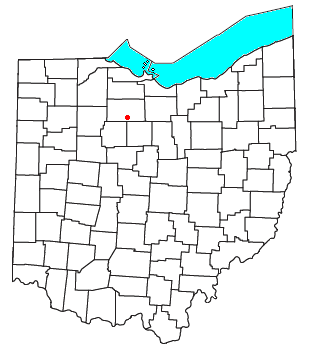
- Location of Melmore, Ohio
- Coordinates: 41°01′34″N 83°06′18″W
- Country: United States
- State: Ohio
- County: Seneca
- Township: Eden

Area
  - Total: 0.59 sq mi (1.54 km^{2})
  - Land: 0.59 sq mi (1.54 km^{2})
  - Water: 0 sq mi (0.00 km^{2})
- Elevation: 856 ft (261 m)

Population (2020)
  - Total: 173
  - Density: 290.7/sq mi (112.23/km^{2})
- Time zone: UTC-5 (Eastern (EST))
  - Summer (DST): UTC-4 (EDT)
- ZIP codes: 44845
- FIPS code: 39-48972
- GNIS feature ID: 2628931

Melmore is a census-designated place in central Eden Township, Seneca County, Ohio, United States. It has a post office with the ZIP code 44845. It is located at the intersection of State Routes 67 and 100. The population was 173 at the 2020 census.

== History ==
Melmore was platted in 1824. The name Melmore was formed from the Latin mel, meaning "honey", and the adjective -more; honey standing for Honey Creek, upon which the town is situated. A post office was established at Melmore in 1825, and remained in operation until 1993.

== Demographics ==
Historical population
Census	Pop.	Note	%±
2020	173		—
U.S. Decennial Census
