= Ohio State Route 198 =

State highway in western Ohio, US

State Route 198

Route information
- Maintained by ODOT
- Length: 12.52 mi (20.15 km)
- Existed: 1924–present

Major junctions
- South end: US 33 / SR 67 / SR 501 near Wapakoneta
- North end: SR 117 near Spencerville

Location
- Country: United States
- State: Ohio
- Counties: Auglaize, Allen

Highway system
- Ohio State Highway System; Interstate; US; State; Scenic
← SR 197	→ SR 199

State Route 198 is a north–south state highway in the western portion of the U.S. state of Ohio. Its southern terminus is at an interchange with U.S. Route 33 just south of Wapakoneta, which is also the western terminus of State Route 67 and the southern terminus of State Route 501; its northern terminus is at State Route 117 nearly 4 miles (6.4 km) east of Spencerville.

== Route description ==
No part of SR 198 in Ohio is included as a part of the National Highway System (NHS). The NHS is a network of highways that are identified as being most important for the economy, mobility and defense of the nation.

SR 198 heads north from an interchange with U.S. Route 33 concurrent with SR 67 and SR 501. The road enter downtown Wapakoneta where SR 67 turns east and both SR 198 and SR 501 turn west. The two routes head west and then turns towards the northwest. Just before leaving Wapakoneta SR 501 leaves the concurrency heading due north. The highway now enters rural Auglaize County passing through farmland. Before the road enters Allen County is an intersection with SR 197. The route enters Allen County and has an intersection with SR 117. This intersection is the northern terminus of SR 117.

== History ==
- 1924 – Original route established; originally routed from St. Marys to 4 miles (6.4 km) west of Spencerville along current State Route 116.
- 1926 – Rerouted to its current alignment, which was the former alignment of State Route 116, and from its current northern terminus to the village of Southworth along previously and currently unnumbered roads.
- 1946 – Truncated at its current northern terminus; its former alignment north to Southworth decertified.
- 1961 – Extended 2 miles (3.2 km) south from Wapakoneta (from its terminus at the former alignment of U.S. Route 33) to its current terminus via a previously unnumbered road.

== Major intersections ==
County	Location	mi	km	Destinations	Notes
Auglaize	Wapakoneta	0.00	0.00	US 33 / SR 67 / SR 501	Western terminus of SR 67; southern terminus of SR 198/SR 501; southern end of SR 67/SR 501 concurrency
Auglaize	Wapakoneta	1.18	1.90	SR 67 north	Northern end of SR 67 concurrency
Auglaize	Wapakoneta	2.19	3.52	SR 501	Northern end of SR 501 concurrency
Auglaize		4.85	7.81	SR 197 west	Eastern terminus of SR 197
Allen		12.52	20.15	SR 117	Northern terminus of SR 198
1.000 mi = 1.609 km; 1.000 km = 0.621 mi: Concurrency terminus
