= Ohio State Route 501 =

North-south state highway in Ohio, US

State Route 501

Route information
- Maintained by ODOT
- Length: 11.93 mi (19.20 km)
- Existed: 1937–present

Major junctions
- South end: US 33 near Wapakoneta
- North end: SR 117 near Lima

Location
- Country: United States
- State: Ohio
- Counties: Auglaize, Allen

Highway system
- Ohio State Highway System; Interstate; US; State; Scenic
← SR 500	→ SR 502

State Route 501 (SR 501) is a north–south state highway in Auglaize and Allen counties, Ohio. The southern terminus of SR 501 is at an interchange with U.S. Route 33 (US 33) just south of Wapakoneta, which is also the western terminus for SR 67 and the southern terminus for SR 198. The route runs concurrently with both of the latter two routes into Wapakoneta, and with SR 198 only north of the city. SR 501’s northern terminus is at SR 117 approximately six miles (9.7 km) west of Lima.

SR 501 was commissioned in 1937, along most of the same route as today. The highway was paved by 1939. In 1961, the southern terminus of the route was moved to its current terminus.

== Route description ==
SR 501 heads north from an interchange with US 33. The road is concurrent with SR 67 and SR 198. The highway passes through industrial properties while paralleling CSX railroad tracks. After paralleling the tracks the route crosses them and enters downtown Wapakoneta. In downtown the road passes through residential properties. SR 67 turns east and SR 198 and SR 501 turn west. The street passes allow the south side of the Auglaize County Court House. After two blocks SR 198 and SR 501 turn north and crosses the Auglaize River. Here, SR 501 has its highest traffic counts; within the 2011 ODOT survey, the road is listed with an average annual daily traffic (AADT) of 9,450 vehicles on a section of highway over the river.

After crossing the river, SR 198 and SR 501 turn northwest leaving downtown Wapakoneta. On the north side of the city SR 501 leaves SR 198 and heads due north. After leaving SR 198, SR 501 passes through a mix of commercial and residential properties, before leaving Wapakoneta. North of Wapakoneta the roadway passes through farmland, with some houses. The highway enters Hume and crosses the Western Ohio Line of the R.J. Corman Railroad. In Allen County the AADT drops to 3,160 vehicles. After Hume, the route passes through farmland and a group of house before ending at an intersection with SR 117. Continuing north after SR 501 ends is Township Road 91 (T–91). The highway is not incorporated within the National Highway System.

== History ==
When first established in 1937, SR 501 ran from downtown Wapakoneta to its current northern terminus at SR 117. The entire route was paved by 1939. When a new southern bypass of Wapakoneta was completed in 1961 and US 33 was re-routed along it, SR 501, along with SR 67 and SR 198, were extended south from downtown along Willipie Street to a new common terminus at the re-routed US 33. The highway has not experienced any major changes since 1961.

== Major intersections ==
County	Location	mi	km	Destinations	Notes
Auglaize	Duchouquet Township	0.00– 0.38	0.00– 0.61	US 33 / SR 67 begins / SR 198 begins / CR 25A (Dixie Highway) – St. Marys, Lakeview, Bellefontaine	Southern terminus at parclo AB-2 interchange; western terminus of SR 67; southern terminus of SR 198; southern end of SR 67 / SR 198 concurrency
Auglaize	Wapakoneta	1.18	1.90	SR 67 east (East Pearl Street) / Willipie Street	Northern end of SR 67 concurrency
Auglaize	Wapakoneta	2.19	3.52	SR 198 north (Defiance Street) / Hamilton Road	Northern end of SR 198 concurrency
Allen	Shawnee Township	11.93	19.20	SR 117 (Spencerville Road) / Wapak Road – Spencerville, Lima	Northern terminus
1.000 mi = 1.609 km; 1.000 km = 0.621 mi: Concurrency terminus
