= Plankton, Ohio =

Unincorporated community in Ohio, U.S.

- Unincorporated community
- Interactive map of Plankton, Ohio
- Coordinates: 40.9578341°N 83.0938037°W
- Country: United States
- State: Ohio
- County: Crawford County
- Township: Texas Township

Government
  - Body: Texas Township Board of Trustees
- Elevation: 922 ft (281 m)
- Time zone: UTC-5 (EST)
  - Summer (DST): UTC-4 (EDT)

Plankton is an unincorporated community in Texas Township, Crawford County, Ohio.

== History ==
Plankton was given its name by a resident named Harvey Close, who also circulated a petition to establish a post office in the community. The post office was in operation from 1891–1922.

Historically, Plankton was a stop on the Lake Erie and Western Railroad. In 1920, the railroad was leased to the Akron, Canton and Youngstown Railroad.

In 1897, a Methodist church was built in Plankton, named the Plankton Methodist Episcopal Church. During the years 1936-1941, a merger of denominations changed the name to the Plankton Methodist Church, and in 1968, another merger changed the name to Plankton United Methodist Church. The church remains active.
