= Wyandot Solar Facility =

Solar power plant in Ohio, United States

- Location of the Wyandot Solar Facility in Ohio
- Country: United States
- Location: Salem Township, Wyandot County, Ohio
- Coordinates: 40°52′49″N 83°18′57″W
- Status: Operational
- Construction began: October 22, 2009
- Commission date: 2010

Solar farm
- Type: Flat-panel PV

Power generation
- Nameplate capacity: 12 MW

The Wyandot Solar Facility is a 12 megawatt (MW) solar photovoltaic power plant completed in 2010, located in Salem Township, Wyandot County, Ohio. This system uses 159,200 panels spread over 83.9 acres (34.0 ha).

Juwi Solar developed the Wyandot Solar Facility and Vaughn Industries, based in Wyandot County, was the primary construction contractor. Most of the construction jobs created by the project went to Ohio residents. First Solar supplied the solar panels from their manufacturing plant in Perrysburg, Ohio.

On August 24, 2010, Ohio Governor Ted Strickland joined The Public Service Enterprise Group, Ohio State University President Dr. E. Gordon Gee, and other local leaders to open the solar facility.

== Production ==
Generation (MW·h) of Wyandot Solar Farm
Year	Jan	Feb	Mar	Apr	May	Jun	Jul	Aug	Sep	Oct	Nov	Dec	Total
2010				1,161	1,600	1,813	1,680	1,596	1,352	710	660	351	10,923
2011	302	747	1,055	1,434	1,681	1,959	1,667	1,746	1,299	1,072	597	508	14,068
2012	308	467	854	1,231	1,865	1,992	1,872	1,708	1,695	1,583	1,169	1,019	15,763
2013	481	698	978	1,056	1,196	1,381	1,286	1,491	1,486	1,565	1,286	1,300	14,203
2014	626	684	1,107	1,254	1,466	1,600	1,478	1,538	1,518	1,402	1,139	782	14,593
2015	692	890	1,270	1,446	1,451	1,504	1,523	1,552	1,284	1,096	1,005	869	14,582
2016	573	1,147	998	1,120	1,383	1,373	1,582	1,541	1,435	1,259	1,102	884	14,398
2017	274	627	724	815	1,072	2,026	1,996	1,819	1,777	1,112	798	569	13,609
Total													112,139

== See also ==
- Energy sector of Ohio
- List of photovoltaic power stations
- Renewable energy in the United States
- Renewable portfolio standard
- Solar power in the United States
