= Mexico, Ohio =

Unincorporated community in Ohio, United States

- Unincorporated community
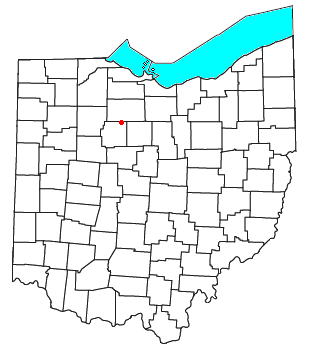
- Location of Mexico, Ohio
- Coordinates: 40°59′11″N 83°11′36″W
- Country: United States
- State: Ohio
- County: Wyandot
- Township: Tymochtee
- Elevation: 807 ft (246 m)
- Time zone: UTC-5 (Eastern (EST))
  - Summer (DST): UTC-4 (EDT)
- GNIS feature ID: 1048970

Mexico is an unincorporated community in northeastern Tymochtee Township, Wyandot County, Ohio, United States.

== History ==
Mexico was laid out and platted in 1832. The community was named in commemoration of the Mexican War of Independence. The community was located in Crawford County until land the town site occupies was given to form Wyandot County in 1845. A post office was established at Mexico in 1837, and remained in operation until 1902.
