= Seal, Ohio =

Unincorporated community in Ohio, United States

Coordinates: 40°52′37″N 83°09′02″W

Seal is an unincorporated community in Wyandot County, in the U.S. state of Ohio.

== History ==
Settlement was made at Seal in 1850. A post office was established at Seal in 1850, and remained in operation until 1903.
