= Brownstown, Wyandot County, Ohio =

Unincorporated community in Ohio, United States

Coordinates: 40°44′16″N 83°22′12″W

Brownstown is an unincorporated community in Wyandot County in the U.S. state of Ohio.

== History ==
Brownstown was laid out by one Mr. Brown, a pioneer who arrived in the 1830s.
