= Texas Township, Crawford County, Ohio =

Township in Ohio, US

- Township
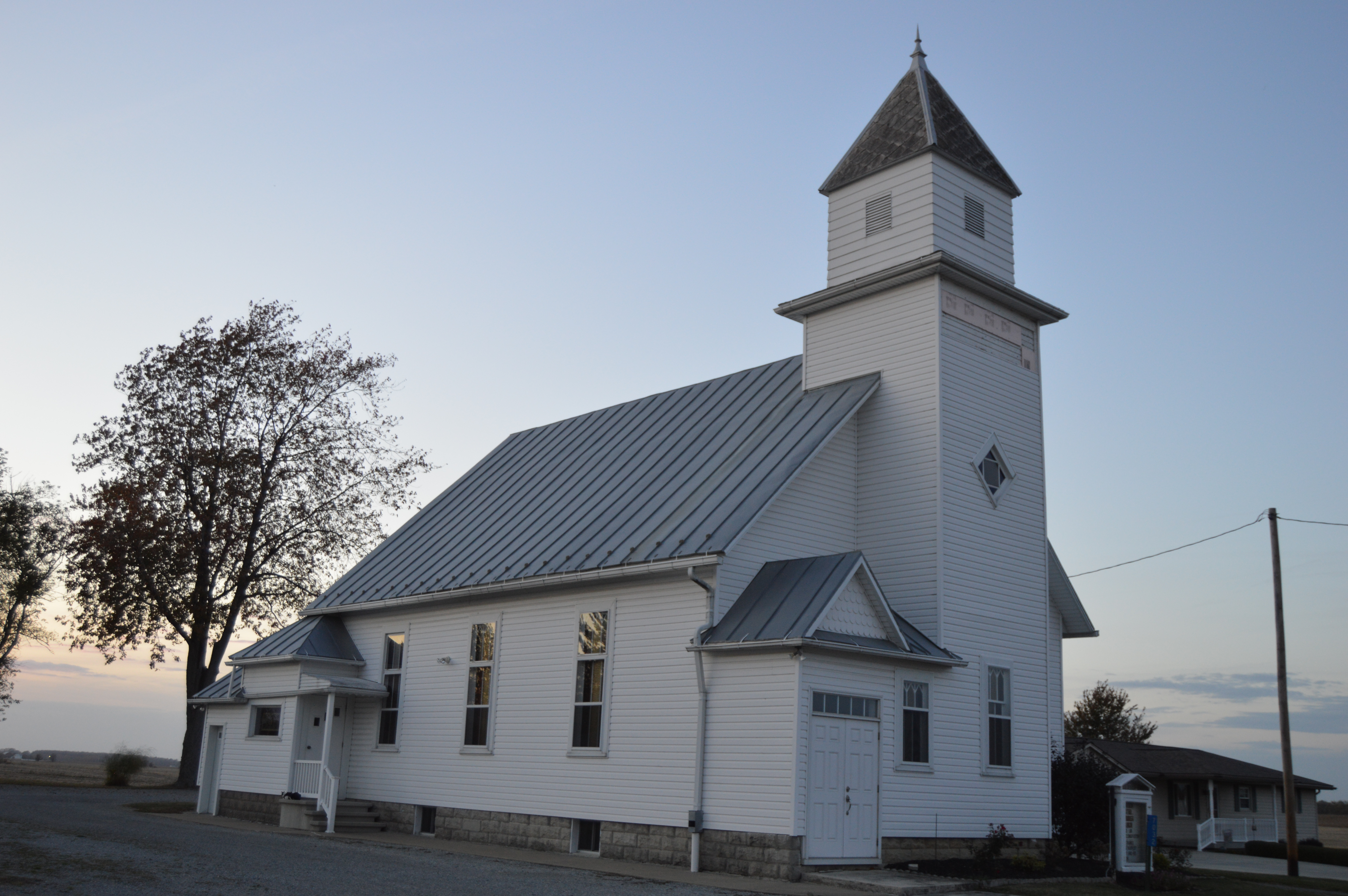
- Methodist church at Plankton

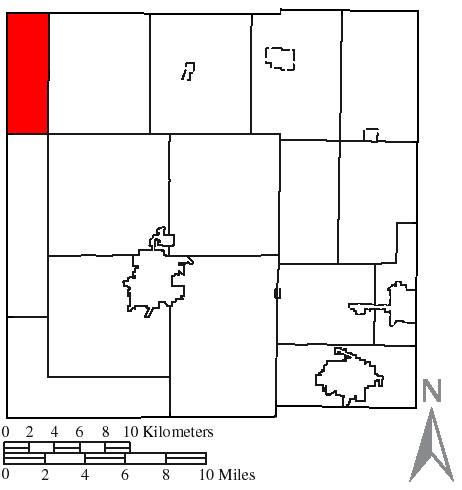
- Location of Texas Township in Crawford County
- Coordinates: 40°57′14″N 83°5′19″W
- Country: United States
- State: Ohio
- County: Crawford

Area
  - Total: 12.0 sq mi (31.2 km^{2})
  - Land: 12.0 sq mi (31.2 km^{2})
  - Water: 0 sq mi (0.0 km^{2})
- Elevation: 938 ft (286 m)

Population (2020)
  - Total: 352
  - Density: 29.2/sq mi (11.3/km^{2})
- Time zone: UTC-5 (Eastern (EST))
  - Summer (DST): UTC-4 (EDT)
- FIPS code: 39-76463
- GNIS feature ID: 1085945

Texas Township is one of the sixteen townships of Crawford County, Ohio, United States. As of the 2020 census the population was 352.

== Geography ==
Located in the northwestern corner of the county, it borders the following townships:

- Eden Township, Seneca County - north
- Bloom Township, Seneca County - northeast corner
- Lykens Township - east
- Holmes Township - southeast corner
- Tod Township - south
- Eden Township, Wyandot County - southwest corner
- Sycamore Township, Wyandot County - west

No municipalities are located in Texas Township, although the unincorporated community of Benton lies in the township's south.

== Name and history ==
Texas Township was organized in 1845. Texas annexation was at that time a hot political topic, hence the name.

It is the only Texas Township statewide.

== Government ==
The township is governed by a three-member board of trustees, who are elected in November of odd-numbered years to a four-year term beginning on the following January 1. Two are elected in the year after the presidential election and one is elected in the year before it. There is also an elected township fiscal officer, who serves a four-year term beginning on April 1 of the year after the election, which is held in November of the year before the presidential election. Vacancies in the fiscal officership or on the board of trustees are filled by the remaining trustees.
