= Crawford Township, Wyandot County, Ohio =

Township in Ohio, US

Crawford Township, Ohio
- Township
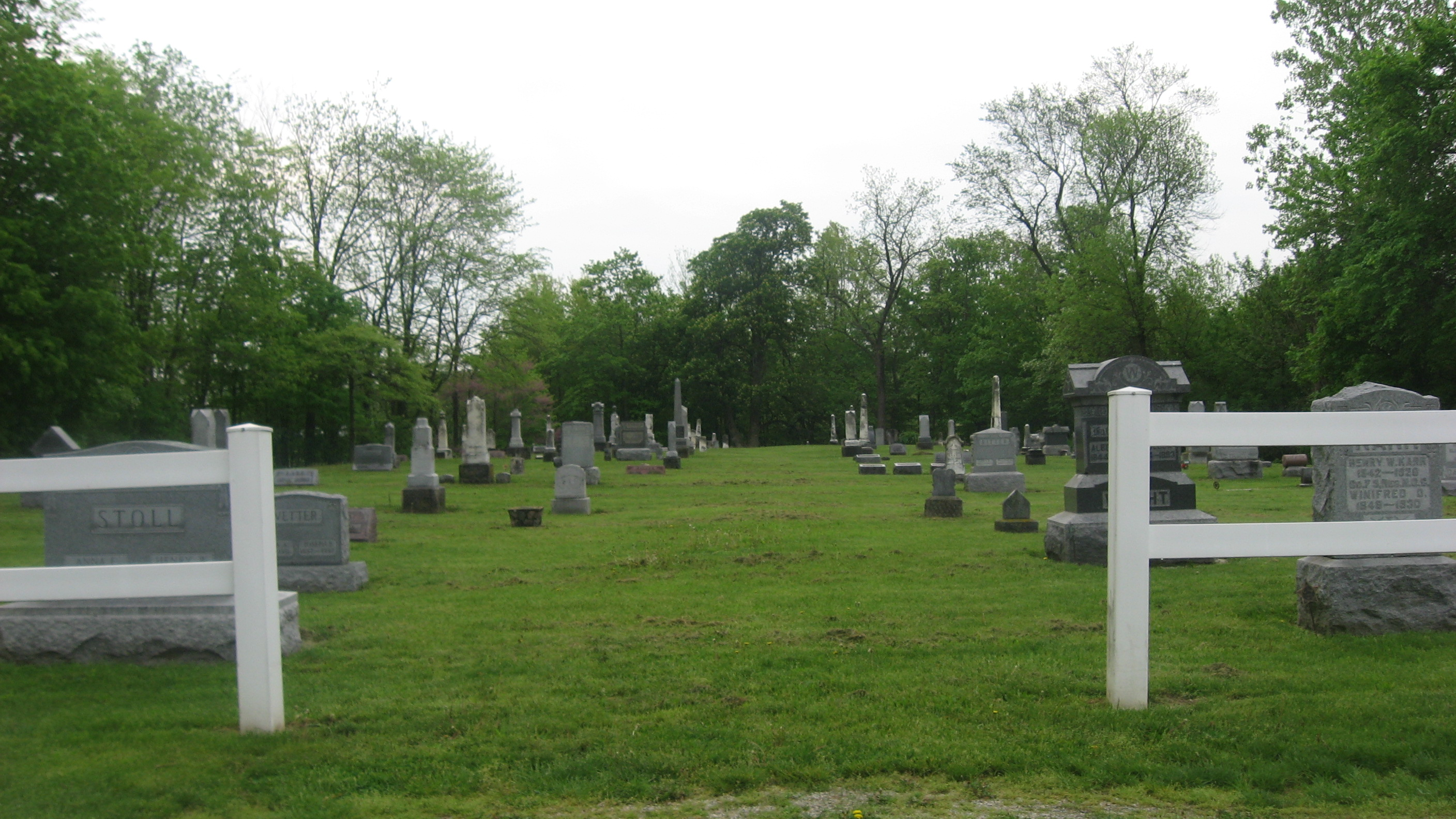
- Graves at the Ritchey Cemetery

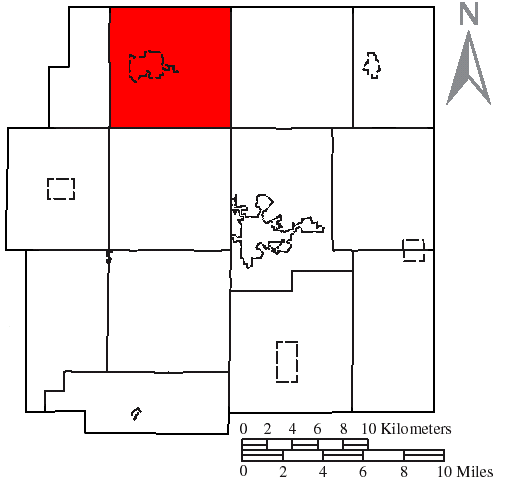
- Location of Crawford Township in Wyandot County
- Coordinates: 40°57′3″N 83°22′10″W
- Country: United States
- State: Ohio
- County: Wyandot

Area
  - Total: 36.1 sq mi (93.6 km^{2})
  - Land: 36.1 sq mi (93.5 km^{2})
  - Water: 0.039 sq mi (0.1 km^{2})
- Elevation: 817 ft (249 m)

Population (2020)
  - Total: 4,610
  - Density: 128/sq mi (49.3/km^{2})
- Time zone: UTC-5 (Eastern (EST))
  - Summer (DST): UTC-4 (EDT)
- FIPS code: 39-19246
- GNIS feature ID: 1087204

Crawford Township is one of the thirteen townships of Wyandot County, Ohio, United States. The 2020 census found 4,610 people in the township, 3,565 of whom lived in the village of Carey.

== Geography ==
Located in the northwestern part of the county, it borders the following townships:

- Big Spring Township, Seneca County - north
- Seneca Township, Seneca County - northeast corner
- Tymochtee Township - east
- Crane Township - southeast corner
- Salem Township - south
- Richland Township - southwest corner
- Ridge Township - west
- Biglick Township, Hancock County - northwest corner

The village of Carey is located in western Crawford Township.

== Name and history ==
Statewide, the only other Crawford Township is located in Coshocton County.

== Government ==
The township is governed by a three-member board of trustees, who are elected in November of odd-numbered years to a four-year term beginning on the following January 1. Two are elected in the year after the presidential election and one is elected in the year before it. There is also an elected township fiscal officer, who serves a four-year term beginning on April 1 of the year after the election, which is held in November of the year before the presidential election. Vacancies in the fiscal officership or on the board of trustees are filled by the remaining trustees.
