= Wyandot County Airport =

- IATA: none; ICAO: none; FAA LID: 56D

Summary
- Airport type: Public
- Owner/Operator: County Airport Authority
- Serves: Upper Sandusky, Ohio
- Opened: September 1955
- Time zone: UTC−05:00 (-5)
  - Summer (DST): UTC−04:00 (-4)
- Elevation AMSL: 829.8 ft / 253 m
- Coordinates: 40°53′00″N 083°18′52″W

Map
- Location of airport in Ohio 56D (the United States)

Runways
Direction	Length		Surface
Direction	ft	m	Surface
18/36	3,997	1,218	Asphalt

Statistics (2023)
- Aircraft Movements: 6,968
- Source: Federal Aviation Administration

Wyandot County Airport (FAA LID: 56D) is a public airport located four miles (6.4 km) northwest of Upper Sandusky, Ohio, United States. It is owned and operated by the County Airport Authority.

== History ==
The county purchased 13 acres (5.3 ha) of land, some of which came from the county home, for the airport in January 1966. At the time, a private airport already existed in the county, but it was inadequate. A contract was accepted in November 1966 and by mid April 1967 construction was underway. The airport and its 4,000-foot (1,200 m) runway were dedicated on 1 October 1967.

An approximately 84-acre (34 ha) solar farm was built on either side of the runway in 2010.

In 2023, the airport received $57,600 to update its master plan.

== Facilities and aircraft ==
Wyandot County Airport covers an area of 107 acres (43 ha) which contains one runway, designated as runway 18/36, with a 3,997 ft × 75 ft (1,218 m × 23 m) asphalt pavement.

The airport does not have a fixed-base operator.

For the 12-month period ending June 12, 2023, the airport had 6,968 aircraft operations, an average of 134 per week: 99% general aviation and 1% air taxi. For the same time period, 10 aircraft were based at the airport, all single-engine airplanes.

== Accidents and incidents ==
- On January 15, 2013, an Aviat Husky crashed while practicing touch-and-go landings at the Wyandot County Airport. On his third approach, the pilot noticed that the wind sock had changed and was now favoring the opposite runway. Thus, the pilot performed a go-around and performed an approach to the opposite runway. After touchdown, the plane's left wing started to rise and the tail swung to the right. The pilot applied left rudder, but the tail continued to the right. The right main gear buckled and the right wing struck the runway. The probable cause of the accident was found to be the pilot's failure to maintain directional control while landing in gusty crosswind conditions.

== See also ==
- List of airports in Ohio
