= Benton, Ohio =

Unincorporated community in Ohio, U.S.

Coordinates: 40°55′37″N 83°05′38″W

Benton is an unincorporated community in Texas Township, Crawford County, Ohio, United States.

== History ==
Benton was laid out in 1841, and named for Thomas Hart Benton, a U.S. Senator from Missouri.
