= Harpster, Ohio =

- Village
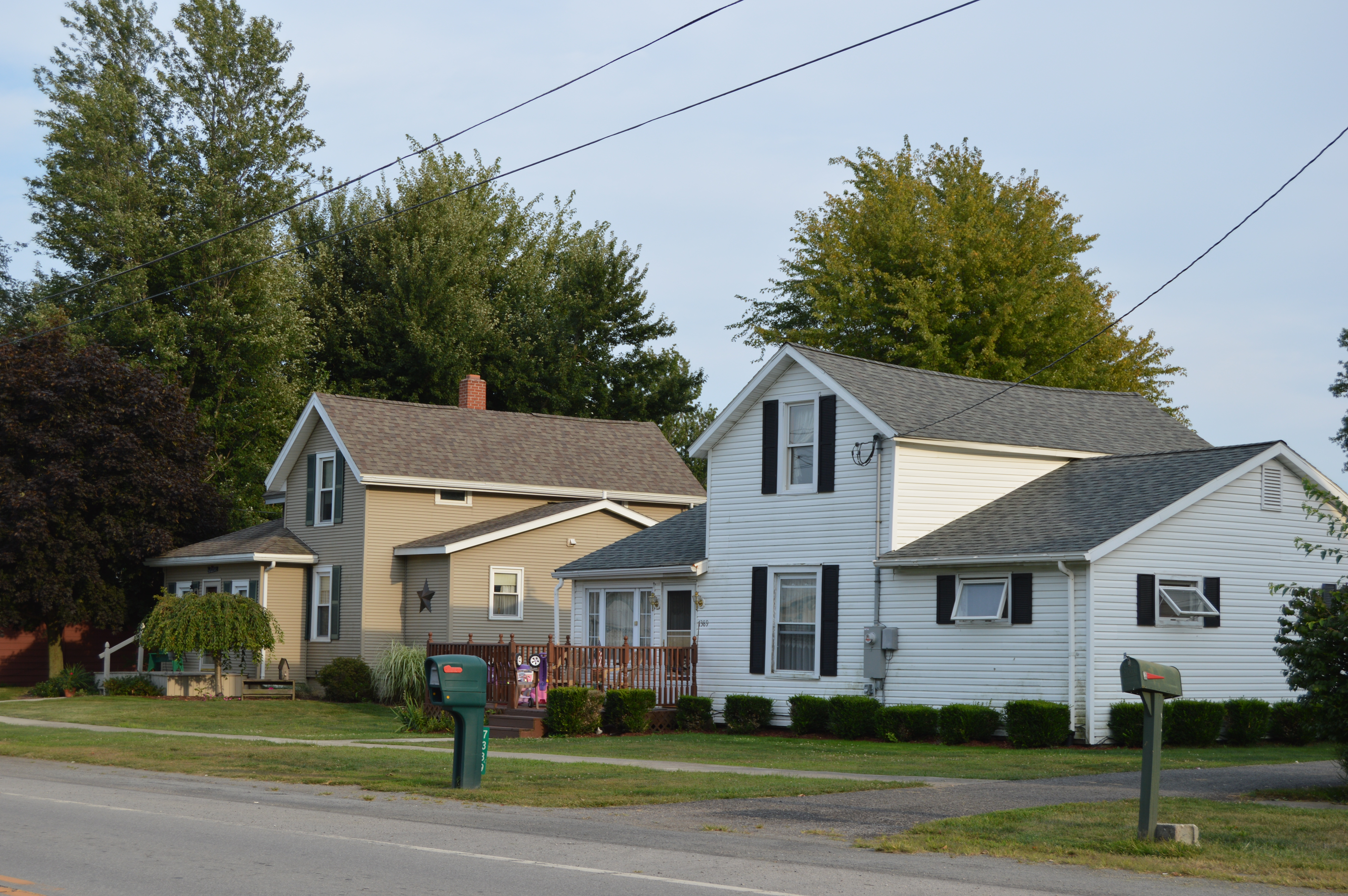
- Houses on Main Street

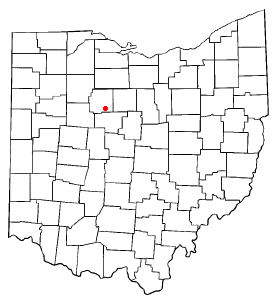
- Location of Harpster, Ohio

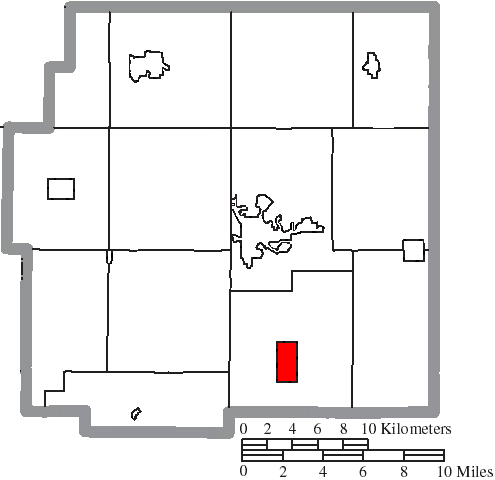
- Location of Harpster in Wyandot County
- Coordinates: 40°44′40″N 83°15′02″W
- Country: United States
- State: Ohio
- County: Wyandot
- Township: Pitt

Area
  - Total: 1.97 sq mi (5.10 km^{2})
  - Land: 1.97 sq mi (5.10 km^{2})
  - Water: 0 sq mi (0.00 km^{2})
- Elevation: 906 ft (276 m)

Population (2020)
  - Total: 160
  - Estimate (2023): 156
  - Density: 81.2/sq mi (31.35/km^{2})
- Time zone: UTC-5 (Eastern (EST))
  - Summer (DST): UTC-4 (EDT)
- ZIP code: 43323
- Area code: 740
- FIPS code: 39-33656
- GNIS feature ID: 2398250

Harpster is a village in Wyandot County, Ohio, United States. The population was 160 at the 2020 census.

== Geography ==
According to the United States Census Bureau, the village has a total area of 1.97 square miles (5.10 km^{2}), all land.

== Demographics ==
Historical population
Census	Pop.	Note	%±
1910	239		—
1920	240		0.4%
1930	239		−0.4%
1940	203		−15.1%
1950	236		16.3%
1960	302		28.0%
1970	291		−3.6%
1980	239		−17.9%
1990	233		−2.5%
2000	203		−12.9%
2010	204		0.5%
2020	160		−21.6%
2023 (est.)	156	▼	−2.5%
U.S. Decennial Census

=== 2010 census ===
As of the census of 2010, there were 204 people, 83 households, and 61 families living in the village. The population density was 103.6 inhabitants per square mile (40.0/km^{2}). There were 90 housing units at an average density of 45.7 per square mile (17.6/km^{2}). The racial makeup of the village was 97.5% White, 1.0% African American, 0.5% from other races, and 1.0% from two or more races. Hispanic or Latino of any race were 0.5% of the population.

There were 83 households, of which 27.7% had children under the age of 18 living with them, 59.0% were married couples living together, 9.6% had a female householder with no husband present, 4.8% had a male householder with no wife present, and 26.5% were non-families. 15.7% of all households were made up of individuals, and 10.8% had someone living alone who was 65 years of age or older. The average household size was 2.46 and the average family size was 2.79.

The median age in the village was 44 years. 21.1% of residents were under the age of 18; 7.3% were between the ages of 18 and 24; 23% were from 25 to 44; 24% were from 45 to 64; and 24.5% were 65 years of age or older. The gender makeup of the village was 48.0% male and 52.0% female.

=== 2000 census ===
As of the census of 2000, there were 203 people, 85 households, and 61 families living in the village. The population density was 104.3 inhabitants per square mile (40.3/km^{2}). There were 90 housing units at an average density of 46.2 per square mile (17.8/km^{2}). The racial makeup of the village was 99.01% White, and 0.99% African American.

There were 85 households, out of which 28.2% had children under the age of 18 living with them, 62.4% were married couples living together, 8.2% had a female householder with no husband present, and 27.1% were non-families. 22.4% of all households were made up of individuals, and 15.3% had someone living alone who was 65 years of age or older. The average household size was 2.39 and the average family size was 2.77.

In the village, the population was spread out, with 23.2% under the age of 18, 5.4% from 18 to 24, 22.2% from 25 to 44, 28.6% from 45 to 64, and 20.7% who were 65 years of age or older. The median age was 44 years. For every 100 females there were 91.5 males. For every 100 females age 18 and over, there were 100.0 males.

The median income for a household in the village was $35,556, and the median income for a family was $35,833. Males had a median income of $29,000 versus $19,375 for females. The per capita income for the village was $16,930. None of the families and 2.2% of the population were living below the poverty line.
