= Little Sandusky, Ohio =

Unincorporated community in Ohio, United States

Coordinates: 40°44′19″N 83°12′55″W

Little Sandusky is an unincorporated community in Wyandot County, in the U.S. state of Ohio.

== History ==
Little Sandusky was laid out in 1830 by Dr. Stephen Fowler, John Wilson, and Walter Woolsey. The community took its name from the nearby Little Sandusky River. A post office called Little Sandusky was established in 1825, and remained in operation until 1903.
