= Wyandot County Courthouse and Jail =

Local government building in the United States

- Wyandot County Courthouse
- U.S. National Register of Historic Places
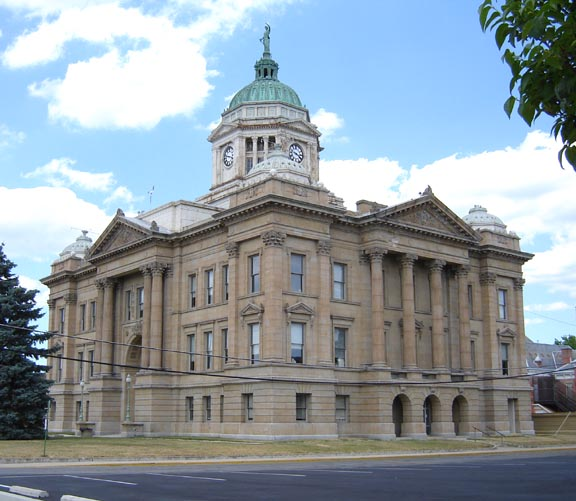
- Interactive map of Wyandot County Courthouse
- Location: Upper Sandusky
- Coordinates: 40.827108°N 83.280668°W
- Area: 1899-1900, 1875
- Built: 1894
- Architect: Yost & Packard
- NRHP reference No.: 73001553
- Added to NRHP: July 2, 1973

Wyandot County Courthouse is a historic courthouse in Upper Sandusky, Ohio. The building was designed by prominent Ohio architects Yost & Packard. It was added to the National Register of Historic Places, along with the neighboring jail, in 1973.

== See also ==
- National Register of Historic Places listings in Wyandot County, Ohio
