= Eden Township, Wyandot County, Ohio =

Township in Ohio, US

- Township
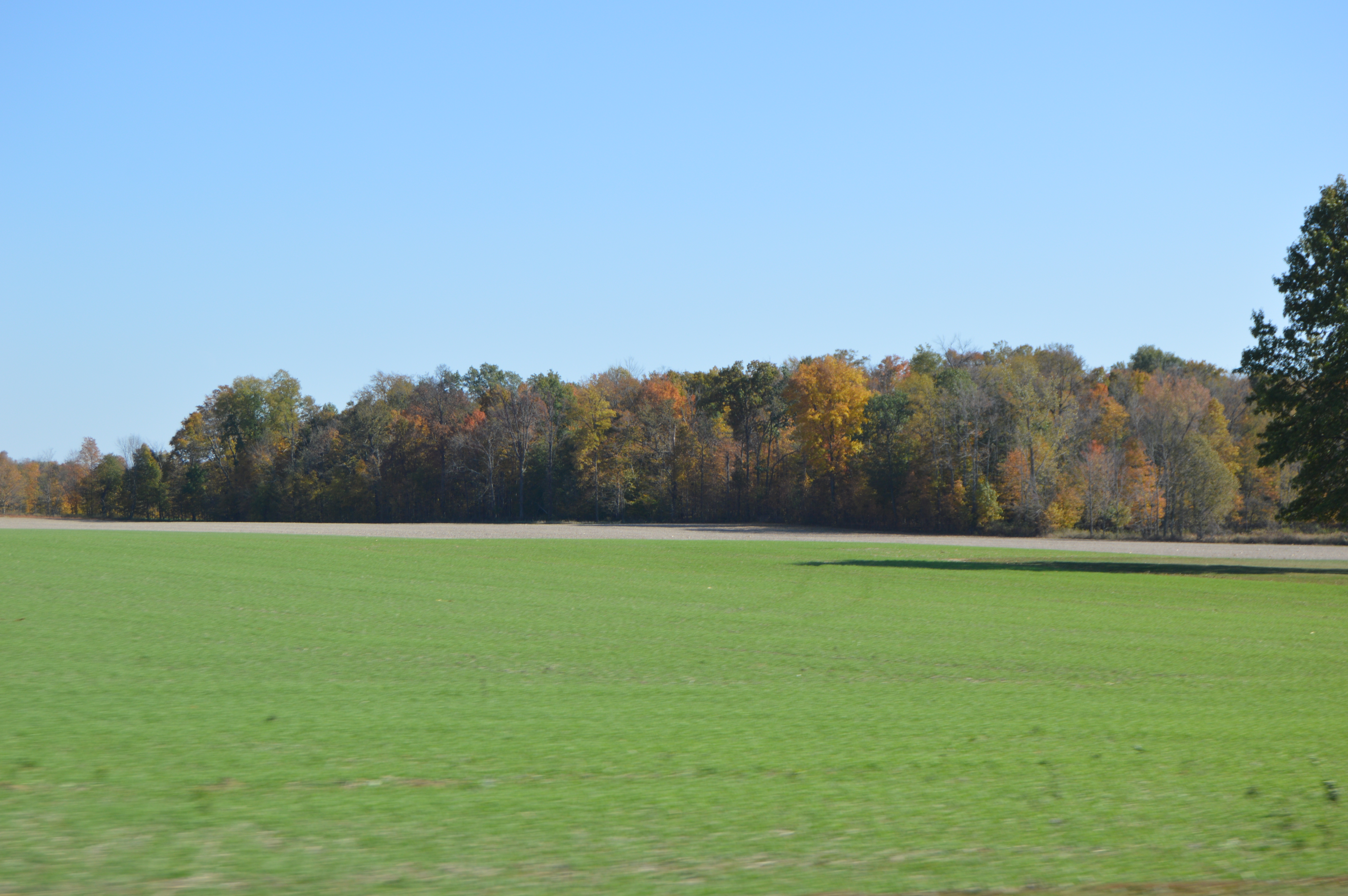
- Young winter wheat and fall colors along State Route 231

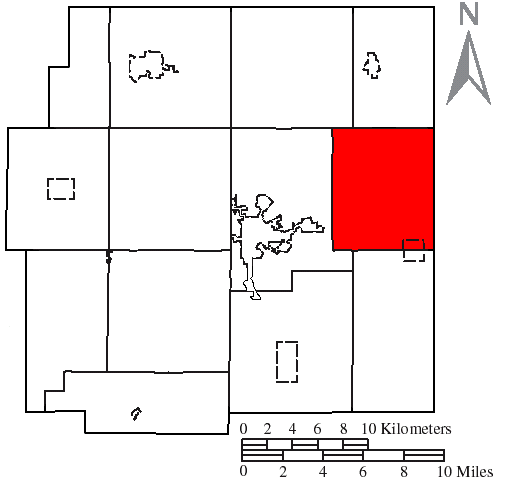
- Location of Eden Township in Wyandot County
- Coordinates: 40°51′28″N 83°9′37″W
- Country: United States
- State: Ohio
- County: Wyandot

Area
  - Total: 30.3 sq mi (78.5 km^{2})
  - Land: 30.3 sq mi (78.4 km^{2})
  - Water: 0.039 sq mi (0.1 km^{2})
- Elevation: 909 ft (277 m)

Population (2020)
  - Total: 1,045
  - Density: 34/sq mi (13.3/km^{2})
- Time zone: UTC-5 (Eastern (EST))
  - Summer (DST): UTC-4 (EDT)
- FIPS code: 39-24360
- GNIS feature ID: 1087205

Eden Township is one of the thirteen townships of Wyandot County, Ohio, United States. The 2020 census found 1,045 people in the township.

== Geography ==
Located in the eastern part of the county, it borders the following townships:

- Sycamore Township - north
- Texas Township, Crawford County - northeast corner
- Tod Township, Crawford County - east
- Antrim Township - south
- Crane Township - west
- Tymochtee Township - northwest

Part of the village of Nevada is located in southeastern Eden Township.

== Name and history ==
Statewide, other Eden Townships are located in Licking and Seneca counties.

== Government ==
The township is governed by a three-member board of trustees, who are elected in November of odd-numbered years to a four-year term beginning on the following January 1. Two are elected in the year after the presidential election and one is elected in the year before it. There is also an elected township fiscal officer, who serves a four-year term beginning on April 1 of the year after the election, which is held in November of the year before the presidential election. Vacancies in the fiscal officership or on the board of trustees are filled by the remaining trustees.
