= Ridge Township, Wyandot County, Ohio =

Township in Ohio, US

- Township
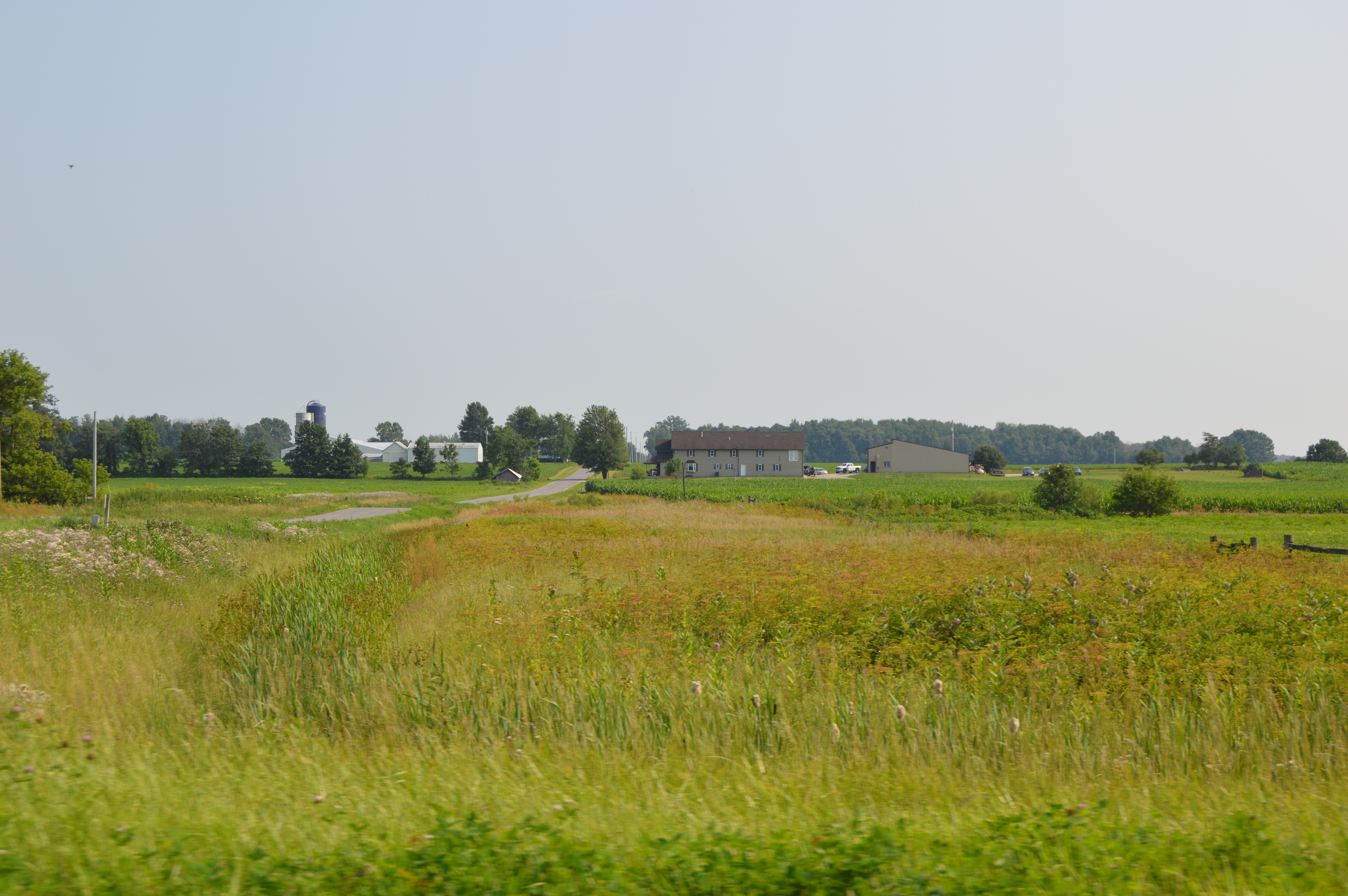
- West of Carey near the Hancock County line

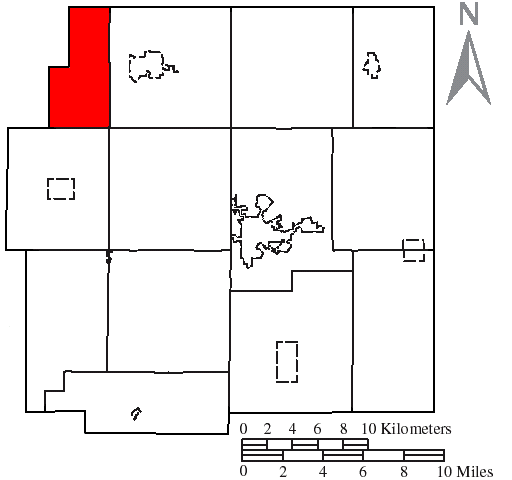
- Location of Ridge Township in Wyandot County
- Coordinates: 40°56′53″N 83°27′9″W
- Country: United States
- State: Ohio
- County: Wyandot

Area
  - Total: 14.8 sq mi (38.4 km^{2})
  - Land: 14.8 sq mi (38.4 km^{2})
  - Water: 0 sq mi (0.0 km^{2})
- Elevation: 856 ft (261 m)

Population (2020)
  - Total: 532
  - Density: 35.9/sq mi (13.9/km^{2})
- Time zone: UTC-5 (Eastern (EST))
  - Summer (DST): UTC-4 (EDT)
- FIPS code: 39-66992
- GNIS feature ID: 1087211

Ridge Township is one of the thirteen townships of Wyandot County, Ohio, United States. The 2020 census found 532 people in the township.

== Geography ==
Located in the northwestern corner of the county, it borders the following townships:

- Biglick Township, Hancock County - north
- Big Spring Township, Seneca County - northeast corner
- Crawford Township - east
- Salem Township - southeast corner
- Richland Township - south
- Amanda Township, Hancock County - west

No municipalities are located in Ridge Township.

== Name and history ==
Statewide, the only other Ridge Township is located in Van Wert County.

== Government ==
The township is governed by a three-member board of trustees, who are elected in November of odd-numbered years to a four-year term beginning on the following January 1. Two are elected in the year after the presidential election and one is elected in the year before it. There is also an elected township fiscal officer, who serves a four-year term beginning on April 1 of the year after the election, which is held in November of the year before the presidential election. Vacancies in the fiscal officership or on the board of trustees are filled by the remaining trustees.
