= Pitt Township, Wyandot County, Ohio =

Township in Ohio, US

- Township
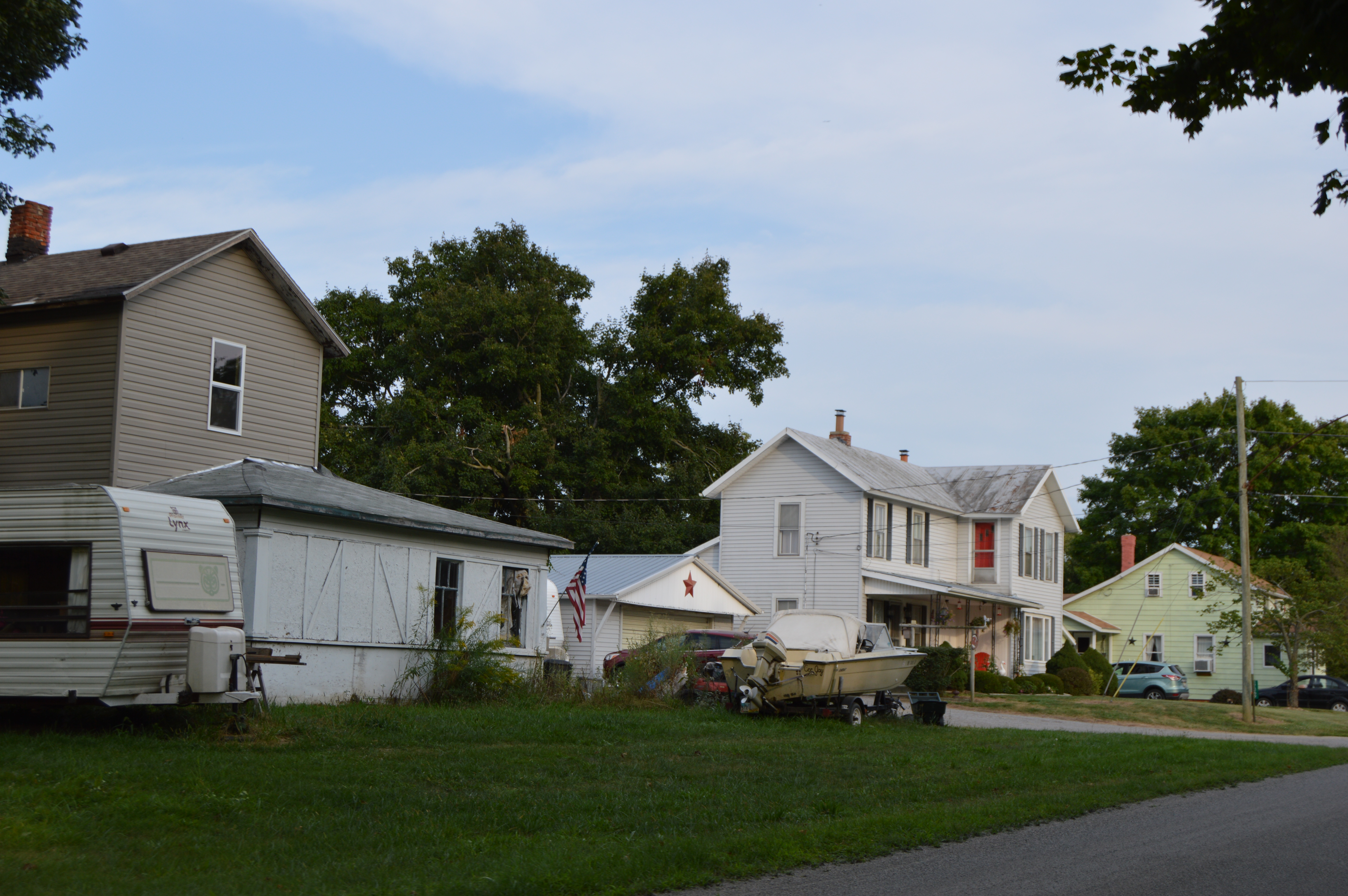
- Houses at Little Sandusky

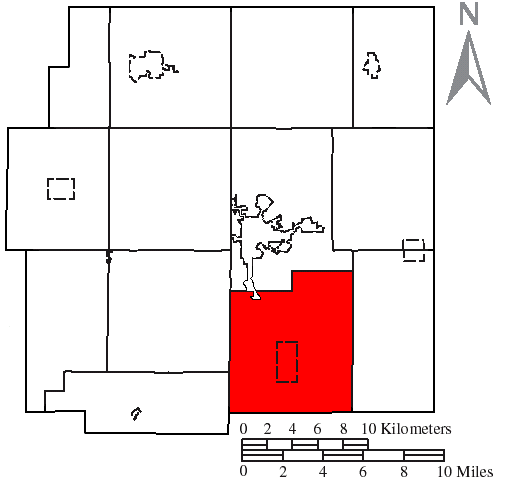
- Location of Pitt Township in Wyandot County
- Coordinates: 40°44′53″N 83°14′56″W
- Country: United States
- State: Ohio
- County: Wyandot

Area
  - Total: 39.5 sq mi (102.4 km^{2})
  - Land: 38.4 sq mi (99.4 km^{2})
  - Water: 1.2 sq mi (3.0 km^{2})
- Elevation: 879 ft (268 m)

Population (2020)
  - Total: 909
  - Density: 24/sq mi (9.1/km^{2})
- Time zone: UTC-5 (Eastern (EST))
  - Summer (DST): UTC-4 (EDT)
- FIPS code: 39-62904
- GNIS feature ID: 1087209

Pitt Township is one of the thirteen townships of Wyandot County, Ohio, United States. The 2020 census found 909 people in the township, 160 of whom lived in the village of Harpster.

== Geography ==
Located in the southern part of the county, it borders the following townships:

- Crane Township – north
- Antrim Township – east
- Grand Township, Marion County – southeast corner
- Salt Rock Township, Marion County – south
- Marseilles Township – southwest
- Mifflin Township – northwest

The village of Harpster is located in central Pitt Township.

== Name and history ==
Formed in 1845, the same year as Wyandot County, Pitt was established from portions of Salt Rock Township in Marion County.

== Government ==
The township is governed by a three-member board of trustees, who are elected in November of odd-numbered years to a four-year term beginning on the following January 1. Two are elected in the year after the presidential election and one is elected in the year before it. There is also an elected township fiscal officer, who serves a four-year term beginning on April 1 of the year after the election, which is held in November of the year before the presidential election. Vacancies in the fiscal officership or on the board of trustees are filled by the remaining trustees.
