= Sycamore Township, Wyandot County, Ohio =

Township in Ohio, US

Sycamore Township Wyandot County, Ohio
- Township
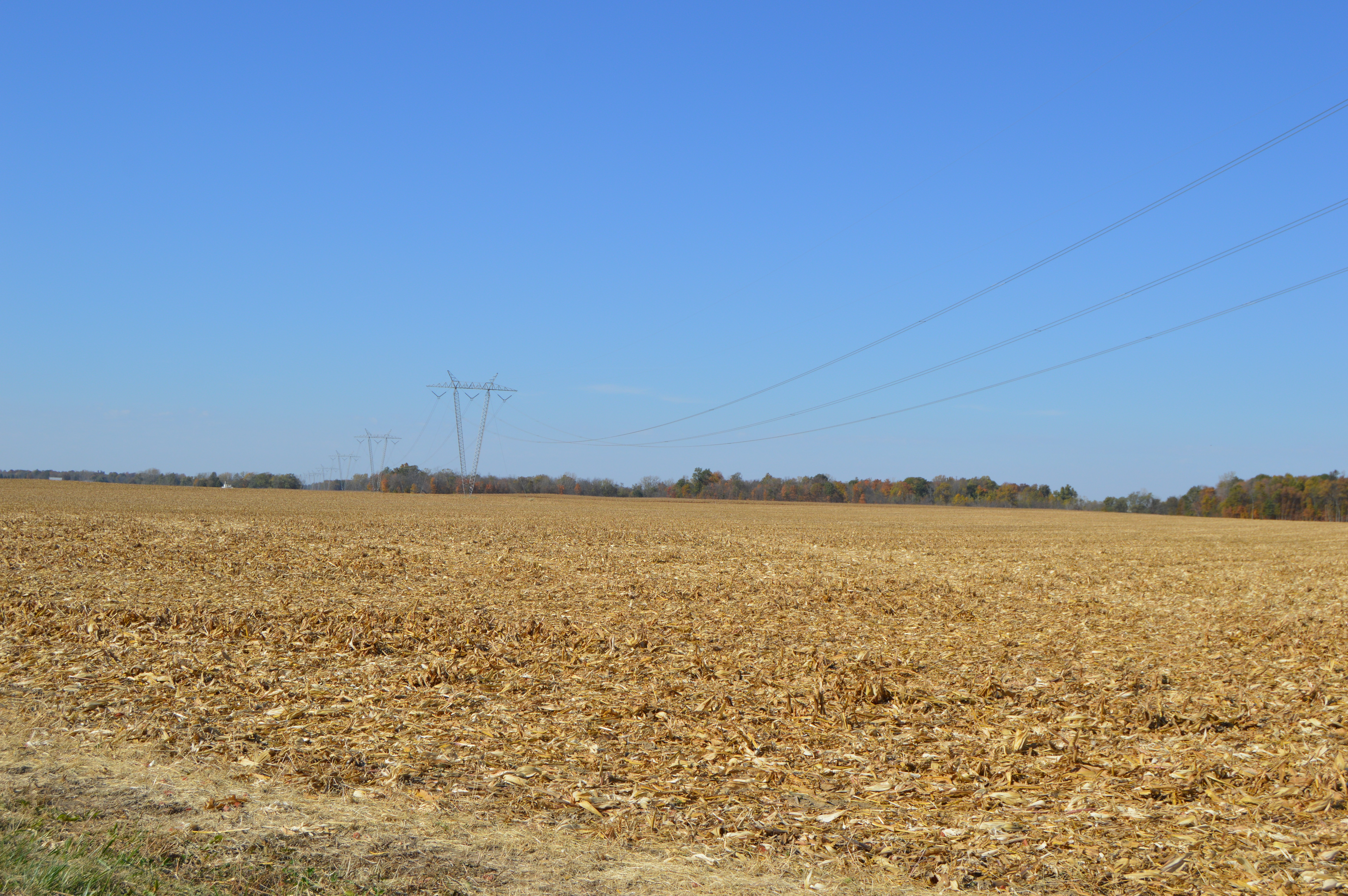
- Fields south of Sycamore

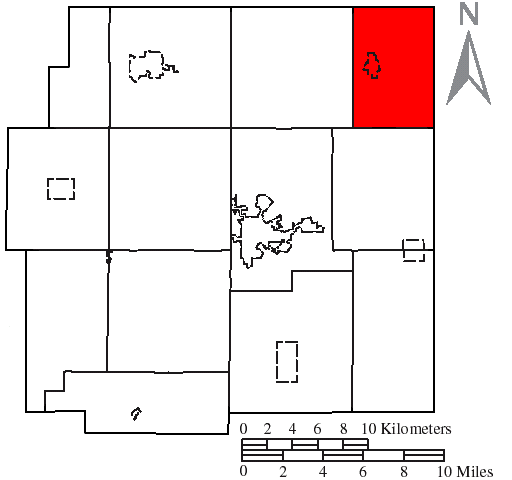
- Location of Sycamore Township in Wyandot County
- Coordinates: 40°57′17″N 83°09′27″W
- Country: United States
- State: Ohio
- County: Wyandot

Government
  - Type: Board of Trustees

Area
  - Total: 24.2 sq mi (62.7 km^{2})
  - Land: 24.2 sq mi (62.7 km^{2})
  - Water: 0 sq mi (0.0 km^{2})
- Elevation: 830 ft (253 m)

Population (2020)
  - Total: 1,462
  - Density: 60.4/sq mi (23.3/km^{2})
- Time zone: UTC-5 (Eastern (EST))
  - Summer (DST): UTC-4 (EDT)
- ZIP code: 44882
- Area code: 419
- FIPS code: 39-75987
- GNIS feature ID: 1087213

Sycamore Township is one of the thirteen townships of Wyandot County, Ohio, United States. The 2020 census found 1,462 people in the township, 793 of whom lived in the village of Sycamore.

== Geography ==
Located in the northeastern corner of the county, it borders the following townships:

- Eden Township, Seneca County - north
- Texas Township, Crawford County - east
- Tod Township, Crawford County - southeast corner
- Eden Township - south
- Tymochtee Township - west
- Seneca Township, Seneca County - northwest corner

The village of Sycamore is located in western Sycamore Township.

== Name and history ==
Statewide, the only other Sycamore Township is located in Hamilton County.

== Government ==
The township is governed by a three-member board of trustees, who are elected in November of odd-numbered years to a four-year term beginning on the following January 1. Two are elected in the year after the presidential election and one is elected in the year before it. There is also an elected township fiscal officer, who serves a four-year term beginning on April 1 of the year after the election, which is held in November of the year before the presidential election. Vacancies in the fiscal officership or on the board of trustees are filled by the remaining trustees.
