= Wyandot County, Ohio =

County in Ohio, United States

- County
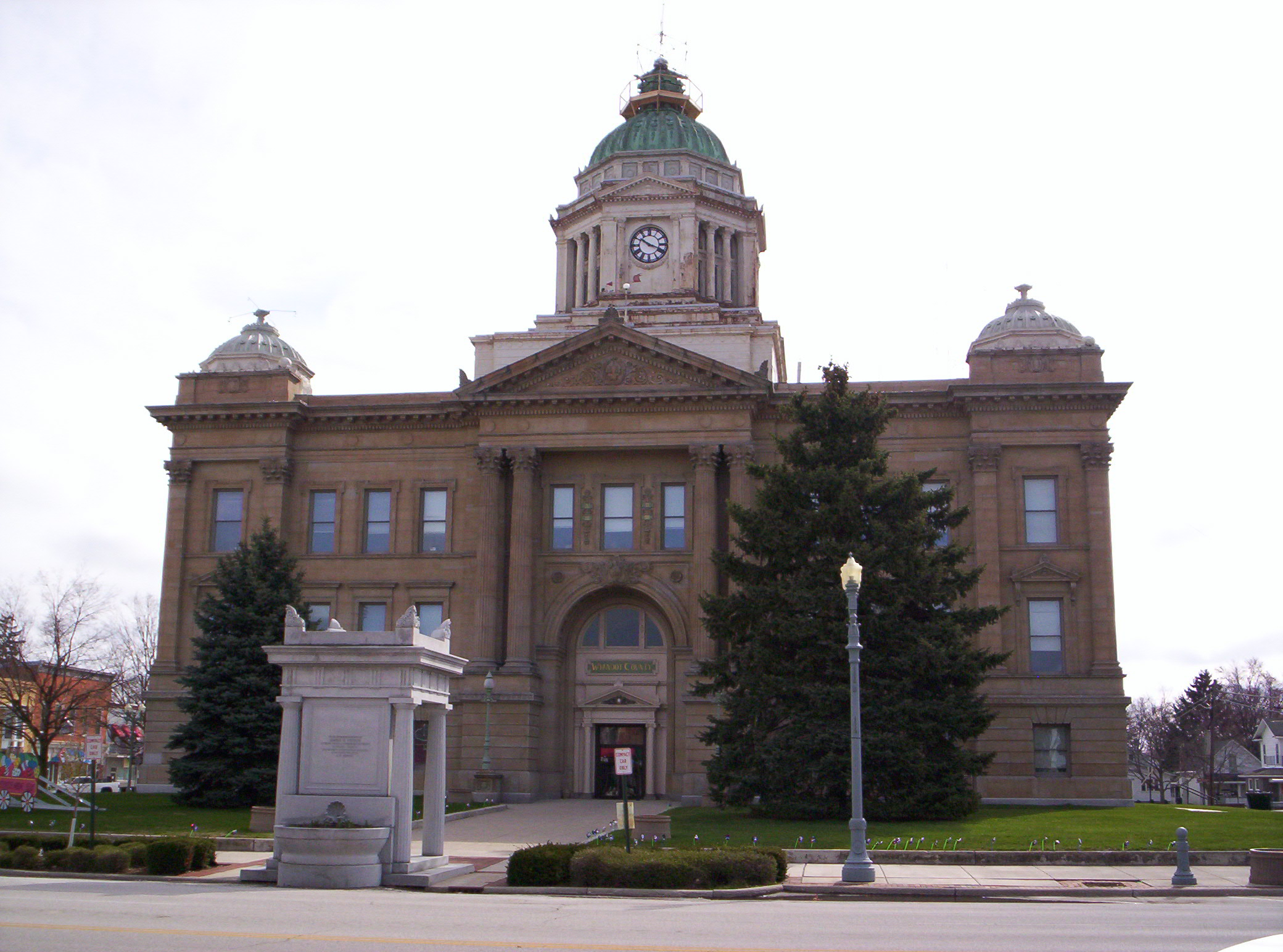
- Wyandot County Courthouse in Upper Sandusky

- Flag Seal

- Location within the U.S. state of Ohio
- Coordinates: 40°51′N 83°18′W
- Country: United States
- State: Ohio
- Founded: February 3, 1845
- Named for: the Wyandot people
- Seat: Upper Sandusky
- Largest city: Upper Sandusky

Area
  - Total: 408 sq mi (1,060 km^{2})
  - Land: 407 sq mi (1,050 km^{2})
  - Water: 0.7 sq mi (1.8 km^{2}) 0.2%

Population (2020)
  - Total: 21,900
  - Estimate (2025): 21,567 ▼
  - Density: 54/sq mi (21/km^{2})
- Time zone: UTC−5 (Eastern)
  - Summer (DST): UTC−4 (EDT)
- Congressional districts: 4th, 5th
- Website: www.co.wyandot.oh.us

Wyandot County is a county located in the northwestern part of the U.S. state of Ohio. As of the 2020 census, the population was 21,900. Its county seat is Upper Sandusky. It was named for the Wyandot People, who lived there before and after European expansion. Their autonym is variously translated from their language as "around the plains" and "dwellers on the peninsula". The county was organized by the state legislature from parts of Crawford, Marion, Hardin and Hancock counties on February 3, 1845.

== Geography ==
According to the U.S. Census Bureau, the county has a total area of 408 square miles (1,060 km^{2}), of which 407 square miles (1,050 km^{2}) is land and 0.7 square miles (1.8 km^{2}) (0.2%) is water.

=== Adjacent counties ===
- Seneca County (north)
- Crawford County (east)
- Marion County (south)
- Hardin County (southwest)
- Hancock County (northwest)

== Demographics ==
Historical population
Census	Pop.	Note	%±
1850	11,194		—
1860	15,596		39.3%
1870	18,553		19.0%
1880	22,395		20.7%
1890	21,722		−3.0%
1900	21,125		−2.7%
1910	20,760		−1.7%
1920	19,481		−6.2%
1930	19,036		−2.3%
1940	19,218		1.0%
1950	19,785		3.0%
1960	21,648		9.4%
1970	21,826		0.8%
1980	22,651		3.8%
1990	22,254		−1.8%
2000	22,908		2.9%
2010	22,615		−1.3%
2020	21,900		−3.2%
2025 (est.)	21,567	▼	−1.5%
U.S. Decennial Census; 1790-1960 1900-1990; 1990-2000 2020

=== 2020 census ===
As of the 2020 census, the county had a population of 21,900. The median age was 43.5 years. 22.6% of residents were under the age of 18 and 20.5% of residents were 65 years of age or older. For every 100 females there were 97.7 males, and for every 100 females age 18 and over there were 95.2 males age 18 and over.

The racial makeup of the county was 94.7% White, 0.4% Black or African American, 0.1% American Indian and Alaska Native, 0.4% Asian, <0.1% Native Hawaiian and Pacific Islander, 1.2% from some other race, and 3.2% from two or more races. Hispanic or Latino residents of any race comprised 2.9% of the population.

30.3% of residents lived in urban areas, while 69.7% lived in rural areas.

There were 9,084 households in the county, of which 28.3% had children under the age of 18 living in them. Of all households, 50.2% were married-couple households, 18.4% were households with a male householder and no spouse or partner present, and 23.9% were households with a female householder and no spouse or partner present. About 29.3% of all households were made up of individuals and 13.7% had someone living alone who was 65 years of age or older.

There were 9,839 housing units, of which 7.7% were vacant. Among occupied housing units, 73.5% were owner-occupied and 26.5% were renter-occupied. The homeowner vacancy rate was 1.1% and the rental vacancy rate was 7.8%.

=== Racial and ethnic composition ===
Wyandot County, Ohio – Racial and ethnic composition Note: the US Census treats Hispanic/Latino as an ethnic category. This table excludes Latinos from the racial categories and assigns them to a separate category. Hispanics/Latinos may be of any race.
Race / Ethnicity (NH = Non-Hispanic)	Pop 1980	Pop 1990	Pop 2000	Pop 2010	Pop 2020	% 1980	% 1990	% 2000	% 2010	% 2020
White alone (NH)	22,410	21,985	22,289	21,727	20,520	98.94%	98.79%	97.30%	96.07%	93.70%
Black or African American alone (NH)	13	19	32	42	77	0.06%	0.09%	0.14%	0.19%	0.35%
Native American or Alaska Native alone (NH)	27	20	18	27	21	0.12%	0.09%	0.08%	0.12%	0.10%
Asian alone (NH)	29	65	115	133	85	0.13%	0.29%	0.50%	0.59%	0.39%
Native Hawaiian or Pacific Islander alone (NH)	x	x	0	4	3	x	x	0.00%	0.02%	0.01%
Other race alone (NH)	8	3	7	4	45	0.04%	0.01%	0.03%	0.02%	0.21%
Mixed race or Multiracial (NH)	x	x	113	174	508	x	x	0.49%	0.77%	2.32%
Hispanic or Latino (any race)	164	162	334	504	641	0.72%	0.73%	1.46%	2.23%	2.93%
Total	22,651	22,254	22,908	22,615	21,900	100.00%	100.00%	100.00%	100.00%	100.00%

=== 2010 census ===
As of the 2010 United States census, there were 22,615 people, 9,091 households, and 6,236 families living in the county. The population density was 55.6 inhabitants per square mile (21.5 inhabitants/km^{2}). There were 9,870 housing units at an average density of 24.3 units per square mile (9.4 units/km^{2}). The racial makeup of the county was 96.9% white, 0.6% Asian, 0.2% American Indian, 0.2% black or African American, 1.1% from other races, and 1.0% from two or more races. Those of Hispanic or Latino origin made up 2.2% of the population. In terms of ancestry, 43.3% were German, 11.8% were American, 11.2% were Irish, and 8.6% were English.

Of the 9,091 households, 32.1% had children under the age of 18 living with them, 53.2% were married couples living together, 10.2% had a female householder with no husband present, 31.4% were non-families, and 26.5% of all households were made up of individuals. The average household size was 2.46 and the average family size was 2.95. The median age was 40.5 years.

The median income for a household in the county was $47,216 and the median income for a family was $57,461. Males had a median income of $40,320 versus $30,027 for females. The per capita income for the county was $22,553. About 4.6% of families and 8.2% of the population were below the poverty line, including 11.0% of those under age 18 and 8.2% of those age 65 or over.

=== 2000 census ===
As of the census of 2000, there were 22,908 people, 8,882 households, and 6,270 families living in the county. The population density was 56 people per square mile (22 people/km^{2}). There were 9,324 housing units at an average density of 23 units per square mile (8.9/km^{2}). The racial makeup of the county was 97.91% White, 0.14% Black or African American, 0.08% Native American, 0.50% Asian, 0.74% from other races, and 0.62% from two or more races. 1.46% of the population were Hispanic or Latino of any race. 45.6% were of German, 19.5% American, 7.0% English and 6.9% Irish ancestry according to Census 2000.

There were 8,882 households, out of which 33.10% had children under the age of 18 living with them, 57.90% were married couples living together, 9.20% had a female householder with no husband present, and 29.40% were non-families. 25.40% of all households were made up of individuals, and 11.70% had someone living alone who was 65 years of age or older. The average household size was 2.53 and the average family size was 3.03.

In the county, the population was spread out, with 25.80% under the age of 18, 8.20% from 18 to 24, 27.90% from 25 to 44, 22.70% from 45 to 64, and 15.40% who were 65 years of age or older. The median age was 37 years. For every 100 females there were 95.10 males. For every 100 females age 18 and over, there were 92.50 males.

The median income for a household in the county was $38,839, and the median income for a family was $45,173. Males had a median income of $31,716 versus $22,395 for females. The per capita income for the county was $17,170. About 3.80% of families and 5.50% of the population were below the poverty line, including 5.20% of those under age 18 and 5.10% of those age 65 or over.

== Politics ==
From 1856 to 1916, Wyandot County was consistently Democratic, voting for the party's candidates in every presidential election in that span. Since 1916, it has become a strongly Republican county, voting for Republican presidential candidates in all but three elections that were national landslides for the Democratic Party, & none since 1964.

United States presidential election results for Wyandot County, Ohio
Year	Republican		Democratic		Third party(ies)	
Year	No.	%	No.	%	No.	%
1856	1,247	47.36%	1,278	48.54%	108	4.10%
1860	1,567	47.72%	1,670	50.85%	47	1.43%
1864	1,730	47.94%	1,879	52.06%	0	0.00%
1868	1,734	44.19%	2,190	55.81%	0	0.00%
1872	1,816	46.13%	2,095	53.21%	26	0.66%
1876	2,079	44.22%	2,619	55.71%	3	0.06%
1880	2,398	44.46%	2,981	55.27%	15	0.28%
1884	2,380	43.05%	3,074	55.60%	75	1.36%
1888	2,256	41.64%	2,981	55.02%	181	3.34%
1892	2,057	40.25%	2,857	55.90%	197	3.85%
1896	2,374	40.44%	3,441	58.62%	55	0.94%
1900	2,397	41.68%	3,268	56.82%	86	1.50%
1904	2,603	47.90%	2,697	49.63%	134	2.47%
1908	2,408	41.36%	3,353	57.59%	61	1.05%
1912	1,409	26.94%	2,848	54.46%	973	18.60%
1916	2,078	38.68%	3,250	60.50%	44	0.82%
1920	4,560	50.50%	4,443	49.21%	26	0.29%
1924	3,973	50.86%	3,271	41.88%	567	7.26%
1928	5,790	65.41%	3,024	34.16%	38	0.43%
1932	3,939	41.42%	5,451	57.32%	119	1.25%
1936	4,260	41.42%	5,597	54.41%	429	4.17%
1940	6,272	59.86%	4,206	40.14%	0	0.00%
1944	6,144	65.54%	3,231	34.46%	0	0.00%
1948	4,849	59.26%	3,308	40.43%	25	0.31%
1952	7,015	71.64%	2,777	28.36%	0	0.00%
1956	6,807	73.18%	2,495	26.82%	0	0.00%
1960	6,786	65.81%	3,526	34.19%	0	0.00%
1964	4,139	43.98%	5,273	56.02%	0	0.00%
1968	5,265	57.90%	2,919	32.10%	910	10.01%
1972	6,414	68.15%	2,771	29.44%	227	2.41%
1976	5,661	56.92%	4,043	40.65%	242	2.43%
1980	5,786	63.06%	2,757	30.05%	632	6.89%
1984	7,204	74.81%	2,342	24.32%	84	0.87%
1988	6,178	66.87%	2,936	31.78%	125	1.35%
1992	4,411	42.24%	3,031	29.02%	3,001	28.74%
1996	4,473	46.56%	3,677	38.27%	1,457	15.17%
2000	6,113	62.21%	3,397	34.57%	317	3.23%
2004	7,254	65.69%	3,708	33.58%	81	0.73%
2008	6,270	56.99%	4,461	40.55%	271	2.46%
2012	6,180	58.29%	4,137	39.02%	285	2.69%
2016	7,468	70.20%	2,515	23.64%	655	6.16%
2020	8,462	74.21%	2,733	23.97%	208	1.82%
2024	8,564	74.83%	2,731	23.86%	150	1.31%

United States Senate election results for Wyandot County, Ohio1
Year	Republican		Democratic		Third party(ies)	
Year	No.	%	No.	%	No.	%
2024	7,813	69.29%	2,996	26.57%	467	4.14%

== Government ==
Wyandot County is represented in the Ohio General Assembly by State Representative Riordan McClain (House District 87) and State Senator Dave Burke (Senate District 26). McClain represents the 87th Ohio House district, which also includes all of Crawford and Morrow counties as well as parts of northern Marion County and southwestern Seneca County. McClain was elected to his first full term in November 2018 after having been appointed to the seat in January 2018. Burke represents the 26th Ohio Senate district, which includes parts or all of 7 counties currently, having been appointed to the seat in July 2011.

Wyandot County has three county commissioners who oversee the various county departments. Current commissioners are: Dave Courtad, Brad Batton and Steve Heinlen.

== Transportation ==
The Wyandot County Airport is located four nautical miles (4.6 mi; 7.4 km) northwest of Upper Sandusky's central business district.

== Communities ==
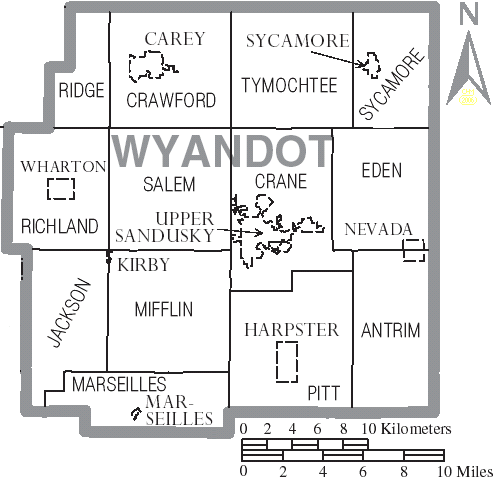
Map of Wyandot County, Ohio with municipal and township labels

=== City ===
- Upper Sandusky (county seat)

=== Towns and villages ===
- Carey
- Forest
- Harpster
- Kirby
- Marseilles
- Nevada
- Sycamore
- Wharton

=== Townships ===
- Antrim
- Crane
- Crawford
- Eden
- Jackson
- Marseilles
- Mifflin
- Pitt
- Richland
- Ridge
- Salem
- Sycamore
- Tymochtee

=== Census-designated place ===
- McCutchenville

=== Unincorporated communities ===
- Belle Vernon
- Brownstown
- Crawford
- Deunquat
- Little Sandusky
- Lovell
- Mexico
- Seal
- Tymochtee
- Wyandot

=== Former settlements ===
- Upper Sandusky Reservation

== Notable people ==
- Darius D. Hare, born near Adrian, United States Congressman from Ohio
- John Stewart, Methodist missionary
- Tarhe, Wyandot leader

== Notable places, activities, and events ==
The largest solar energy farm in Ohio covers 80 acres (320,000 m^{2}) adjacent to the Wyandot County Airport. It has 159,000 ground-mounted solar panels, and can produce 12 megawatts. It was inaugurated on August 19, 2010, with Governor Ted Strickland. It was developed by PSEG Energy.

== See also ==
- National Register of Historic Places listings in Wyandot County, Ohio
