= Eden Township, Seneca County, Ohio =

Township in Ohio, US

- Township
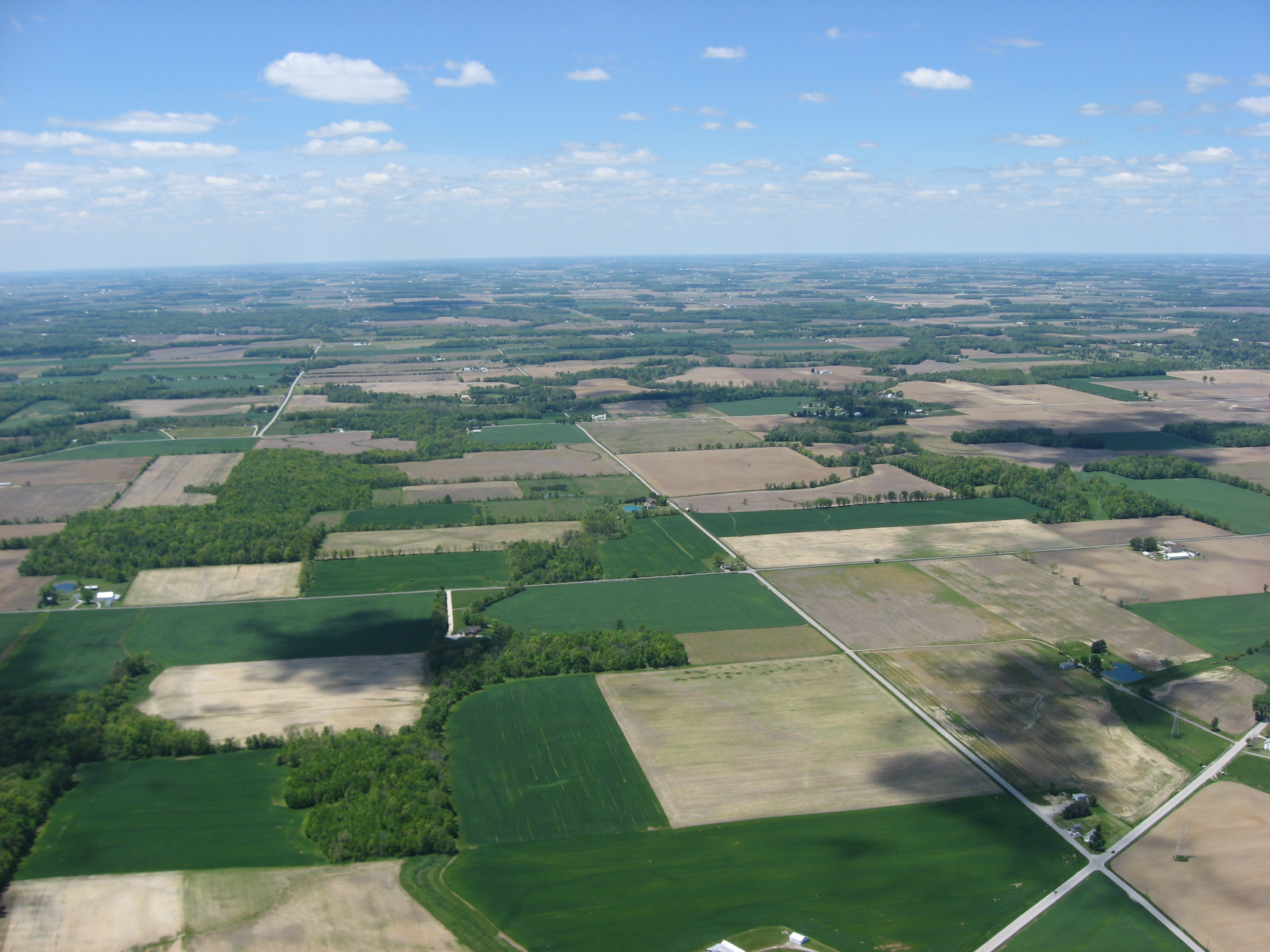
- Countryside near Melmore

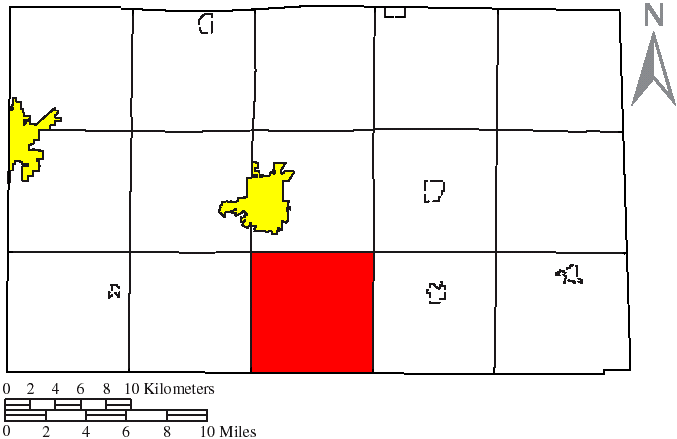
- Location of Eden Township in Seneca County.
- Coordinates: 41°2′22″N 83°7′41″W
- Country: United States
- State: Ohio
- County: Seneca

Area
  - Total: 36.4 sq mi (94.2 km^{2})
  - Land: 36.3 sq mi (94.0 km^{2})
  - Water: 0.077 sq mi (0.2 km^{2})
- Elevation: 869 ft (265 m)

Population (2020)
  - Total: 2,042
  - Density: 56/sq mi (21.7/km^{2})
- Time zone: UTC-5 (Eastern (EST))
  - Summer (DST): UTC-4 (EDT)
- FIPS code: 39-24346
- GNIS feature ID: 1086944

Eden Township is one of the fifteen townships of Seneca County, Ohio, United States. The 2020 census found 2,042 people in the township.

== Geography ==
Located in the southern part of the county, it borders the following townships:

- Clinton Township - north
- Scipio Township - northeast corner
- Bloom Township - east
- Lykens Township, Crawford County - southeast corner
- Texas Township, Crawford County - south, east of Sycamore Township
- Sycamore Township, Wyandot County - south, west of Texas Township
- Tymochtee Township, Wyandot County - southwest corner
- Seneca Township - west
- Hopewell Township - northwest corner

No municipalities are located in Eden Township, although the census-designated place of Melmore lies at the center of the township.

== Name and history ==
Eden Township was organized in 1821.

Statewide, other Eden Townships are located in Licking and Wyandot counties.

== Government ==
The township is governed by a three-member board of trustees, who are elected in November of odd-numbered years to a four-year term beginning on the following January 1. Two are elected in the year after the presidential election and one is elected in the year before it. There is also an elected township fiscal officer, who serves a four-year term beginning on April 1 of the year after the election, which is held in November of the year before the presidential election. Vacancies in the fiscal officership or on the board of trustees are filled by the remaining trustees.
