= Crane Township, Wyandot County, Ohio =

Township in Ohio, US

- Township
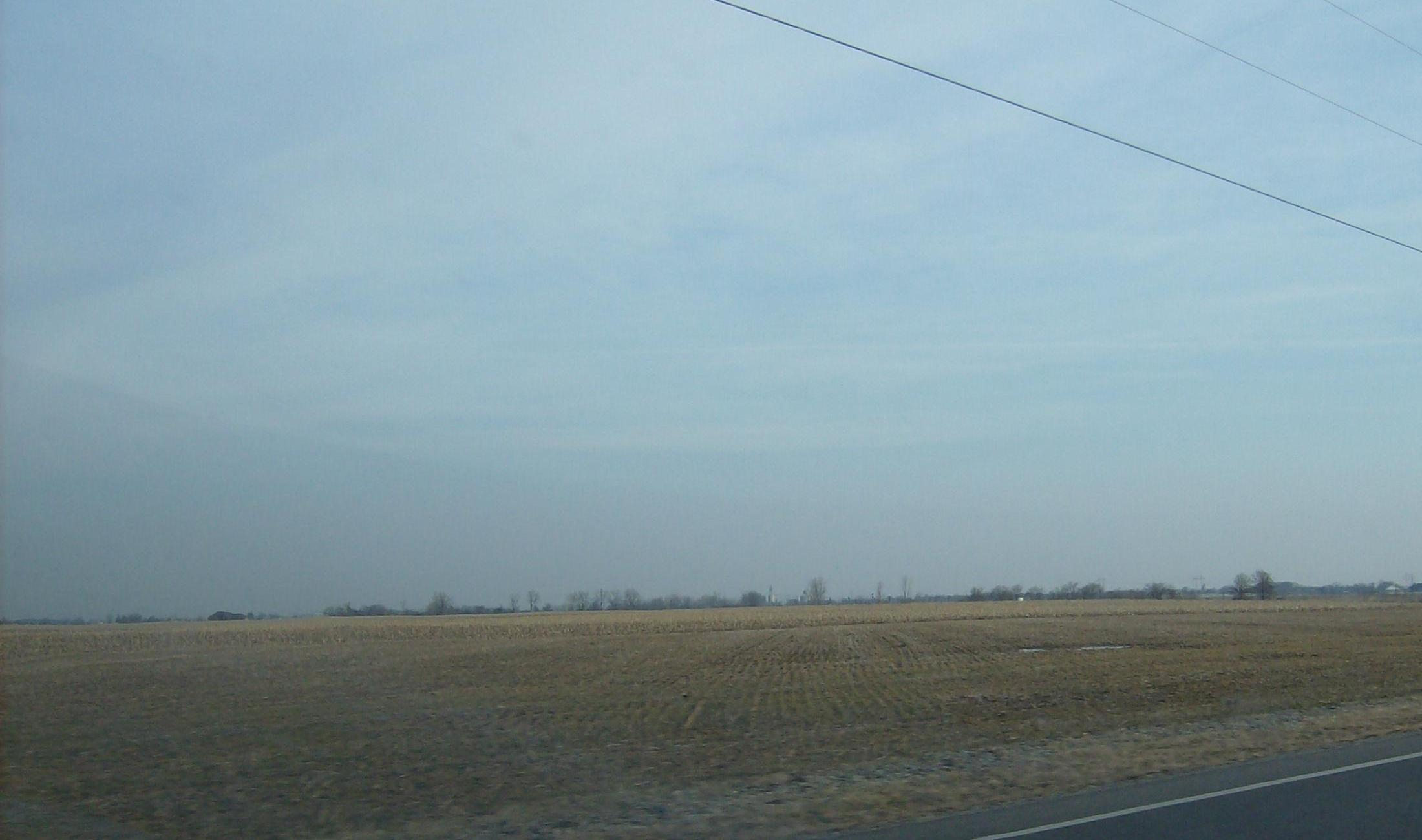
- Crane Township includes wide plains used for farming

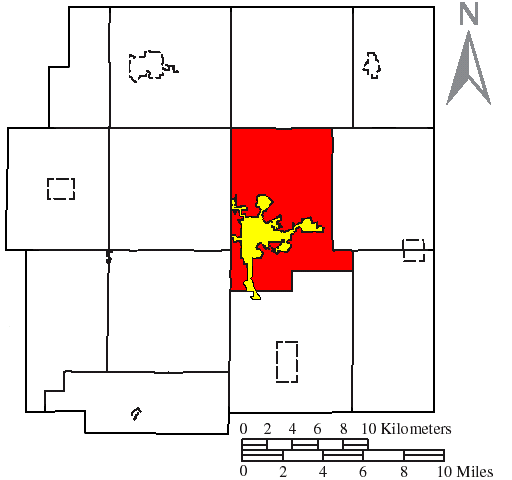
- Location of Crane Township (red) in Wyandot County, next to the city of Upper Sandusky (yellow)
- Coordinates: 40°50′5″N 83°15′59″W
- Country: United States
- State: Ohio
- County: Wyandot

Area
  - Total: 39.6 sq mi (102.5 km^{2})
  - Land: 39.4 sq mi (102.0 km^{2})
  - Water: 0.19 sq mi (0.5 km^{2})
- Elevation: 837 ft (255 m)

Population (2020)
  - Total: 7,533
  - Density: 191/sq mi (73.9/km^{2})
- Time zone: UTC-5 (Eastern (EST))
  - Summer (DST): UTC-4 (EDT)
- FIPS code: 39-19190
- GNIS feature ID: 1087203

Crane Township is one of the thirteen townships of Wyandot County, Ohio, United States. The 2020 census found 7,533 people in the township, 6,698 of whom lived in the city of Upper Sandusky.

== Geography ==
Located in the center of the county, it borders the following townships:

- Tymochtee Township - north
- Eden Township - east
- Antrim Township - southeast
- Pitt Township - south
- Mifflin Township - southwest
- Salem Township - west
- Crawford Township - northwest corner

The city of Upper Sandusky, the county seat of Wyandot County, is located in central Crane Township.

== Name and history ==
Statewide, the only other Crane Township is located in Paulding County.

== Government ==
The township is governed by a three-member board of trustees, who are elected in November of odd-numbered years to a four-year term beginning on the following January 1. Two are elected in the year after the presidential election and one is elected in the year before it. There is also an elected township fiscal officer, who serves a four-year term beginning on April 1 of the year after the election, which is held in November of the year before the presidential election. Vacancies in the fiscal officership or on the board of trustees are filled by the remaining trustees.
