= Ohio State Route 103 =

East-west state highway in Ohio, US

State Route 103

Route information
- Maintained by ODOT
- Length: 77.07 mi (124.03 km)
- Existed: 1923–present

Major junctions
- West end: I-75 in Bluffton
- I-75 in Bluffton; US 68 in Arlington; US 23 / SR 15 in Carey; US 224 in Willard
- East end: SR 61 near Willard

Location
- Country: United States
- State: Ohio
- Counties: Allen, Hancock, Wyandot, Crawford, Huron

Highway system
- Ohio State Highway System; Interstate; US; State; Scenic
← SR 102	→ SR 104
← SR 193	→ SR 195

State Route 103 (SR 103) is a 77.07-mile (124.03 km) state route that runs between Bluffton and Willard in the US state of Ohio. Most of the route is a rural two-lane highway and passes through both farmland and residential properties. In Bluffton the route has two interchanges with Interstate 75 (I–75).

The highway was first signed in 1923 on much the same alignment as today. In both 1935 and 1938 the route was extended east. The entire route was paved by 1939. Some of the highway replaced U.S. Route 25 (US 25), in 1964. SR 103 replaced the SR 194 and SR 298 designation of the highway from Chatfield to Willard, in 1969.

== Route description ==
SR 103 begins at an interchange with I–75, on the south side of Bluffton. The route heads northwest as a two-lane highway crossing over a railroad track. The road passes through residential properties, before turning northeast towards downtown Bluffton. In downtown Bluffton the highway passes on the northwest side of Bluffton University, before the road turn toward the southeast. As the route heads southeast it passes over the railroad track again, followed by a curve due east. After the curve is the second interchange with I–75, in a commercial area of Bluffton. The highway passes the Bluffton Airport and leaves the village of Bluffton. East of Bluffton the route passes through farmland and has an intersection with SR 235, in rural Hancock County. The route enters Arlington, passing through mostly residential properties. In the center of the village SR 103 has an intersection with U.S. Route 68 (US 68).

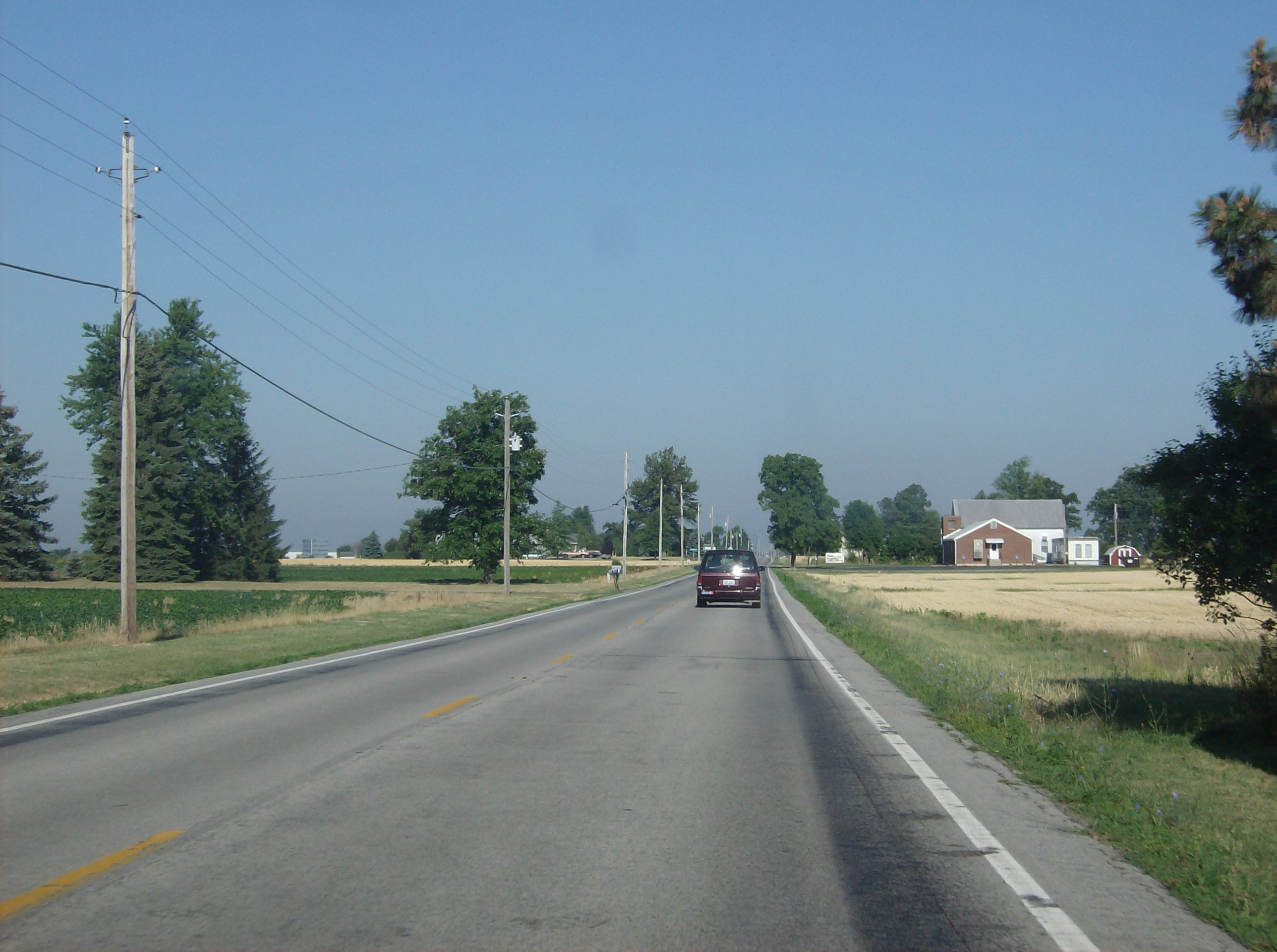
Along State Route 103 in Orange Township, Hancock County.

East of the intersection with US 68, SR 103 has an at-grade railroad crossing, before leaving Arlington. The highway passes through farmland and begins a concurrency with SR 37, on the south side of Mount Blanchard. The concurrency heads north through Mount Blanchard, before SR 103 turns due east, just north of the town. SR 103 heads east, until a sharp turn due north. Followed by a second turn due east. As the highway nears Carey it begins to curve northeast. The route enters Carey at en interchange with US 23 and SR 15. SR 103 continues northeast concurrent with US 23, passing residential properties on its way to downtown. In downtown Carey SR 103 leaves US 23 and heads southeast concurrent with SR 199. The concurrency passes more residential properties and has an at-grade railroad. The route leaves SR 199 heading due east and leaves the town of Carey soon after.

East of Carey, SR 103 heads east passes farmland, with some woodland. The route has a T-intersection with SR 53, near Tymochtee. SR 103 turns northeast onto SR 53, until SR 103 turns due east. The highway heads east through mostly farmland, before entering Sycamore. On the east side of Sycamore SR 103, begins a concurrency with SR 67. In the center of the Village SR 67 turns due north onto SR 231, with SR 103 still heading east, concurrent with SR 231. The concurrency leaves Sycamore and enter rural Wyandot County, where SR 231 leaves SR 103 heading due south. SR 103 crosses into Crawford County. The highway heads towards Chatfield, passing through a very short concurrency with SR 100 and an intersection with SR 19.

In Chatfield SR 103, turns northeast concurrent with SR 4. The concurrency passes through the center of the village, before SR 103 turns due east, leaving SR 4. The route heads due east toward New Washington, passing through farmland. On the west side of New Washington the highway curves southeast, before curving back due east, passing through residential properties. In downtown the route turns due south, passing commercial properties and having an intersection with SR 602. At the intersection with SR 602, SR 103 turns southeast and SR 602 continues due south. The roadway passes more residential properties, before leaving New Washington. The route heads east through farmland, having an intersection with SR 39, before turning due north in rural Crawford County. The highway heads due north, until the Crawford–Huron county line, where SR 103 turns due east. SR 103 heads east as the county line, before turning due north towards Willard.

SR 103 enters Willard from the south, passing the Willard Municipal Airport and passing through commercial properties. The road has an intersection with US 224, before heading through residential properties. The route enters downtown Willard as Main Street and makes a sharp turn due east onto Tiffin Street. Tiffin Street heads east through residential properties and passing under a railroad with a low 13 ft 2-in clearance, before an intersection with SR 99. East of the intersection with SR 99, SR 103 has an intersection with SR 598, before leaving Willard. East of Willard the highway passes through farmland, having an intersection with SR 61. The intersection with SR 61 is the western terminus of SR 103.

The section of SR 103 that is concurrent with US 23 is part of the National Highway System, a system of routes important for the nation's economy, mobility and defense.

== History ==
SR 103 was originally signed in 1923, between Bluffton and Carey. In 1935 the route was extended east to an intersection with SR 53 near Tymochtee. The route was extended east to an intersection with SR 4 near Chatfield in 1938. The whole route was paved by 1939. Between 1962 and 1964, I–75 was built and open between Bluffton and Cygnet. US 25 ran concurrent with I–75, leaving SR 103 to replace US 25 through the south side of Bluffton. By 1969, its eastern terminus was extended to its current location, replacing the now defunct route numbers 194 and 298. No significant changes have taken place to this state route since 1969.

== Major intersections ==
County	Location	mi	km	Destinations	Notes
Allen	Bluffton	0.00	0.00	I-75	Western terminus of SR 103; exit 140 on I–75
Hancock	Bluffton	2.71	4.36	I-75	Exit 142 on I–75
Hancock		5.01	8.06	SR 235	
Hancock	Jenera	10.08	16.22	SR 698 north	Southern terminus of SR 698
Hancock	Arlington	14.07	22.64	US 68	
Hancock	Mount Blanchard	19.01	30.59	SR 37 south	Southern end of SR 37 concurrency
Hancock	Mount Blanchard	21.08	33.92	SR 37 north	Northern end of SR 37 concurrency
Wyandot	Carey	30.29– 30.42	48.75– 48.96	US 23 south / SR 15 west	Southern end of US 23 concurrency; eastern terminus of SR 15
Wyandot	Carey	31.61	50.87	US 23 north / SR 199 north / SR 568 west	Northern end of US 23 concurrency; western end of SR 199 concurrency; eastern terminus of SR 568
Wyandot	Carey	32.79	52.77	SR 199 south	Eastern end of SR 199 concurrency
Wyandot	Tymochtee	37.60	60.51	SR 53 south	Southern end of SR 53 concurrency
Wyandot	Tymochtee	38.16	61.41	SR 53 north	Northern end of SR 53 concurrency
Wyandot	Sycamore	43.07	69.31	SR 67 west	Western end of SR 67 concurrency
Wyandot	Sycamore	43.50	70.01	SR 67 east / SR 231 north	Eastern end of SR 67 concurrency; western end of SR 231 concurrency
Wyandot	Deunquat	45.52	73.26	SR 231 south	Eastern end of SR 231 concurrency
Crawford		48.81	78.55	SR 100 north	Western end of SR 100 concurrency
Crawford		48.95	78.78	SR 100 south	Eastern end of SR 100 concurrency
Crawford		51.55	82.96	SR 19	
Crawford	Chatfield	55.34	89.06	SR 4 south	Southern end of SR 4 concurrency
Crawford	Chatfield	56.41	90.78	SR 4 north	Northern end of SR 4 concurrency
Crawford	New Washington	60.88	97.98	SR 602 south	Northern terminus of SR 602
Crawford		65.16	104.86	SR 39 east	Western terminus of SR 39
Huron	Willard	72.94	117.39	US 224	
Huron	Willard	74.53	119.94	SR 99	
Huron	Willard	76.30	122.79	SR 598 south	Northern terminus of SR 598
Huron	Willard	77.07	124.03	SR 61	Eastern terminus of SR 103
1.000 mi = 1.609 km; 1.000 km = 0.621 mi: Concurrency terminus
