= Ohio State Route 182 =

State highway in Wyandot County, Ohio, US

State Route 182

Route information
- Maintained by ODOT
- Length: 7.97 mi (12.83 km)
- Existed: 1923–2007

Major junctions
- West end: SR 53 / SR 67 / SR 199 in Upper Sandusky
- East end: SR 231 in Nevada

Location
- Country: United States
- State: Ohio
- Counties: Wyandot

Highway system
- Ohio State Highway System; Interstate; US; State; Scenic
← SR 181	→ SR 183

State Route 182 (SR 182) was a 7.97-mile-long (12.83 km) east–west state highway in the northwestern part of the U.S. state of Ohio. The route ran from Ohio State Route 231 in Nevada to SR 53, SR 67, and SR 199 in Upper Sandusky. It ran through the county of Wyandot.

== Route description ==
Along its path, SR 182 passes through the eastern portion of Wyandot County. No segments of SR 182 were included as a part of the National Highway System (NHS). The NHS is a network of highways that are identified as being most important for the economy, mobility and defense of the nation.

== History ==
The SR 182 designation was applied in 1923. It was originally routed from its western terminus in Upper Sandusky to Old SR 5 in Bucyrus. Part of SR 182 was removed in 1971. They removed SR 231 in Nevada to U.S. 30 in Bucyrus. In 2007, State Route 182 was no longer considered a state route.

== Major intersections ==
The entire route was in Wyandot County.

Location	mi	km	Destinations	Notes
Upper Sandusky	0.00	0.00	SR 53 / SR 67 / SR 199 (Wyandot Avenue / Sandusky Avenue)	
Nevada	7.97	12.83	SR 231	
1.000 mi = 1.609 km; 1.000 km = 0.621 mi
