= Ohio State Route 22 =

State Route 22

Route information
- Maintained by ODOT

Location
- Country: United States
- State: Ohio

Highway system
- Ohio State Highway System; Interstate; US; State; Scenic
← US 22	→ US 23

In Ohio, State Route 22 may refer to:

- U.S. Route 22 in Ohio, the only Ohio highway numbered 22 since 1927
- Ohio State Route 22 (1923-1927), now US 23 (Marion to Carey), SR 15 (Carey to Ney), and SR 249 (Ney to Indiana)
