= Ohio State Route 698 =

State highway in Hancock County, Ohio, US

State Route 698

Route information
- Maintained by ODOT
- Length: 6.44 mi (10.36 km)
- Existed: 1937–present

Major junctions
- South end: SR 103 in Jenera
- North end: County Road 313 (C-313) near Findlay

Location
- Country: United States
- State: Ohio
- Counties: Hancock

Highway system
- Ohio State Highway System; Interstate; US; State; Scenic
← SR 697	→ SR 699

Ohio State Route 698 (OH 698) is a north–south state route in northwestern Ohio. Its southern terminus is at OH 103 near Jenera, and its northern terminus is at Hancock County Road 313 (formerly US 25), which is parallel to I-75, about 5 miles (8.0 km) southwest of Findlay.

== Route description ==
OH 698 begins in a fairly rural setting at OH 103 in Van Buren Township. Just 0.25-mile (0.40 km) north of that intersection, though, OH 698 enters into Jenera. OH 698 follows Main Street through the village, passing by a few side streets on the way through. Heading north out of Jenera, OH 698 enters into a rural area primarily consisting of farmland, with an occasional house popping up along the way. OH 698 passes by Hancock County Road 24, and enters into Eagle Township.

Into Eagle Township, OH 698 has intersections with Township Road 34, Township Road 25, County Road 26 and County Road 37, all the while seeing little change in the landscape, and following a very straight path. OH 698 experiences some slight curvature north of County Road 37, but resumes a straight, northerly trek as it passes by Township Road 43 and Township Road 44. Further north, OH 698 arrives at its southern intersection with Township Road 48, crosses over I-75 without fanfare, then crosses its northern intersection with Township Road 48. OH 698 comes to an end as it arrives at County Road 313, which at one time was the routing of US 25.

== History ==
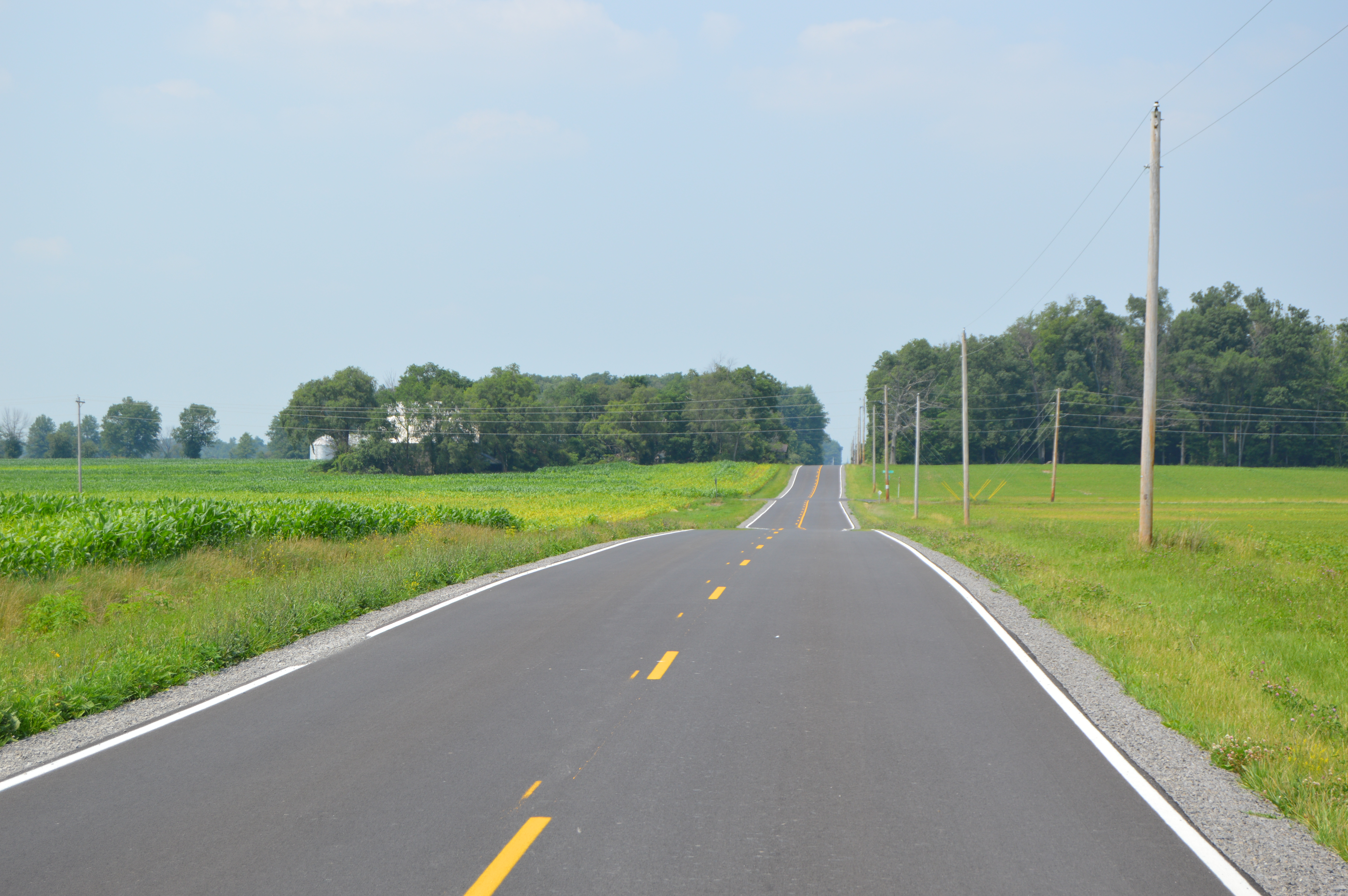
Former alignment just north of US 30

OH 698 made its debut in 1937, running between US 30 (currently Old US 30) four miles west of Williamstown and US 25 (currently Hancock County Road 313) five miles southwest of Findlay.

No significant changes took place in the routing of OH 698 for about 70 years. In 2007, however, in conjunction with the opening of the new four-lane expressway alignment of US 30 through Hancock and Wyandot Counties, the southern end of OH 698 was truncated to its intersection with OH 103 just south of Jenera.

== Major intersections ==
The entire route is in Hancock County.

Location	mi	km	Destinations	Notes
Van Buren Township	0.00	0.00	SR 103	
Eagle Township	6.44	10.36	CR 313	Former routing of US 25
1.000 mi = 1.609 km; 1.000 km = 0.621 mi
