= Ohio State Route 330 =

State highway in Hancock County, Ohio, US

State Route 330

Route information
- Maintained by ODOT
- Length: 2.85 mi (4.59 km)
- Existed: 1932–present

Major junctions
- South end: SR 15 near Vanlue
- North end: SR 568 near Vanlue

Location
- Country: United States
- State: Ohio
- Counties: Hancock

Highway system
- Ohio State Highway System; Interstate; US; State; Scenic
← SR 329	→ SR 331

State Route 330 (SR 330) is a north–south state highway in the northwestern portion of the U.S. state of Ohio. The southern terminus of SR 330 is at a diamond interchange with the SR 15 expressway just south of the village limits of Vanlue. Its northern terminus is at SR 568 nearly 1.75 miles (2.82 km) north of Vanlue.

This two-lane state route was created in the early 1930s, generally along its present routing. From the late 1930s until the middle of the 1960s, SR 330 continued further north along present-day County Road 330 (CR 330) to SR 12 near Arcadia. At the end of that time frame, the highway was restored to its original, shorter routing whose primary function was to serve the community of Vanlue.

== Route description ==
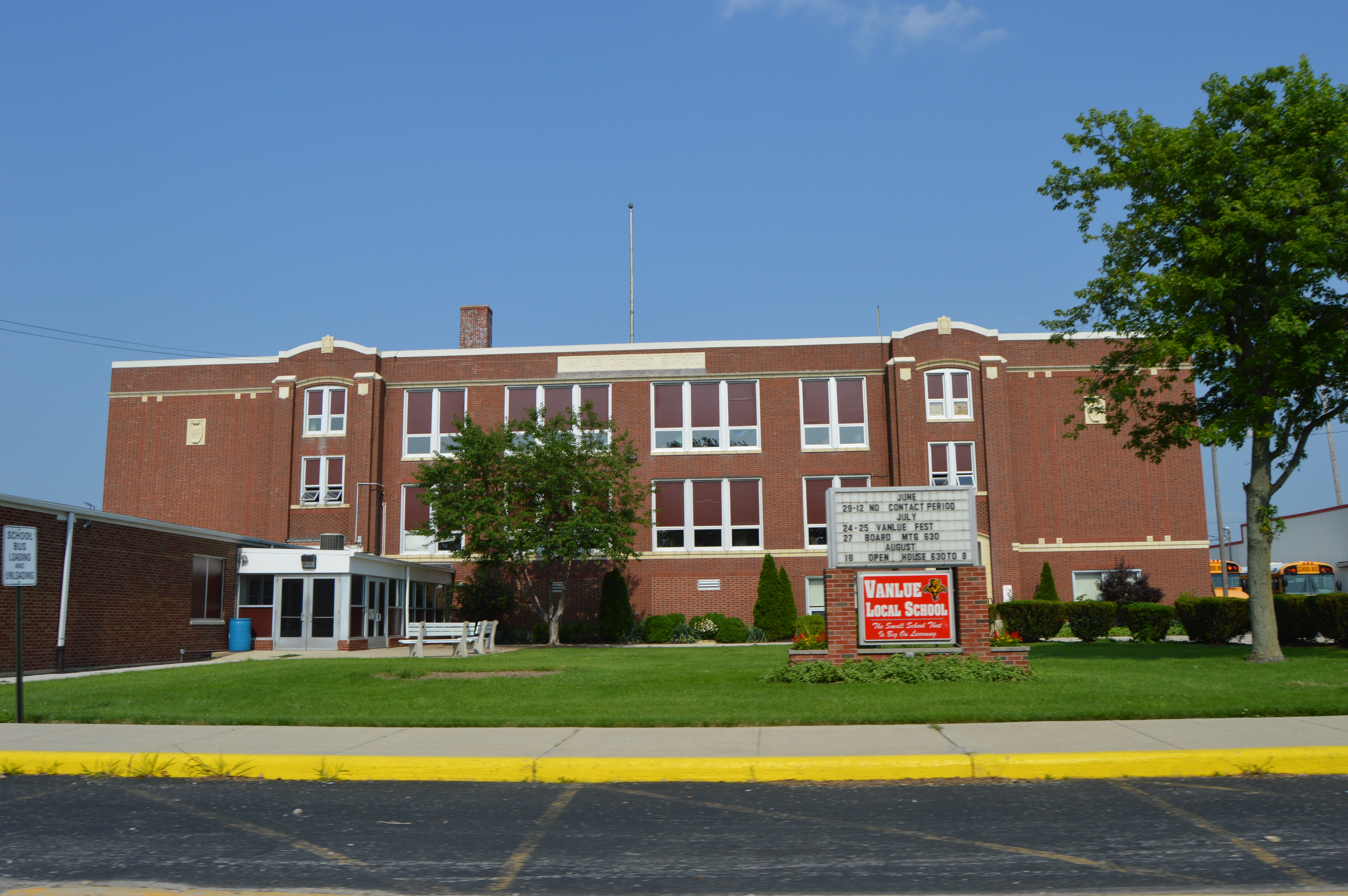
Vanlue High School

SR 330 is situated entirely within the eastern half of Hancock County. The highway begins at a diamond interchange with the SR 15 expressway in Amanda Township, picking up where CR 197 leaves off. The highway briefly travels to the northeast amidst farmland before entering Vanlue. SR 330 follows Buffalo Street into the village, passing amidst some commercial businesses as it enters into the downtown of the village. SR 330 turns southeast onto Main Street, and goes through a residential neighborhood before reaching the East Street intersection, which is located adjacent to Vanlue High School. The state route turns north onto East Street, and passes amidst a few more residences prior to departing the village and re-entering Amanda Township. The remainder of the highway travels among a landscape of vast farmland, with a few homes appearing here and there. SR 330 travels due north, then follows a slight reverse curve that takes it to the northwest before resuming a northerly trek. Amidst that curve, it enters Biglick Township. SR 330 comes to an end at its junction with SR 568. Continuing north following the end of the state route is CR 330.

This highway is not included as a component of the National Highway System, a network of highways identified as being most important for the economy, mobility and defense of the country.

== History ==
The SR 330 designation was assigned in 1932. Originally, the highway, following its present alignment, served as a spur route off of what is now SR 568 serving the village of Vanlue. At the time, SR 568 was designated as a portion of SR 15.

Five years after its assignment, SR 330 was extended north from its present northern terminus along the routing of CR 330 to a new endpoint at SR 12 approximately 2 miles (3.2 km) north of Arcadia. By 1965, SR 330's northern terminus was re-instated to its original location when the entirety of the 1937 extension was deleted from the state highway system. With jurisdiction of this portion of roadway transferred to Hancock County, the road was now identified as CR 330. Meanwhile, this was also the year when the SR 15 designation was transferred to a new four-lane expressway that was constructed in parallel to the south of its original two-lane alignment between Findlay and Carey, passing just to the south of Vanlue. Consequently, the route intersecting SR 330 at its northern terminus was now designated as SR 568. At the same time, SR 330 was extended slightly to the south of its former southern terminus in Vanlue to a new endpoint at a diamond interchange with the new SR 15 expressway.

== Major intersections ==
The entire route is in Hancock County.

Location	mi	km	Destinations	Notes
Amanda Township	0.00	0.00	SR 15	Interchange
Biglick Township	2.85	4.59	SR 568	
1.000 mi = 1.609 km; 1.000 km = 0.621 mi
