= Ohio State Route 15 =

State highway in northwestern Ohio, US

State Route 15

Route information
- Maintained by ODOT
- Length: 102.312 mi (164.655 km)
- Existed: 1926–present

Major junctions
- East end: US 23 / SR 103 near Carey
- US 68 in Findlay; I-75 in Findlay; US 224 in Findlay; US 127 near Bryan; US 6 near Bryan; US 20A near Montpelier; I-80 / I-90 / Ohio Turnpike in Holiday City; US 20 in Pioneer
- North end: M-99 near Pioneer

Location
- Country: United States
- State: Ohio
- Counties: Wyandot, Hancock, Putnam, Defiance, Williams

Highway system
- Ohio State Highway System; Interstate; US; State; Scenic
← SR 14	→ SR 16
← US 22	SR 22	→ US 23

State Route 15 (SR 15) is a north–south and east–west route in northwestern Ohio. Its southern (eastern) terminus is at its interchange with U.S. Route 23/State Route 103 (US 23/SR 103) near Carey, and its northern (western) terminus is at the Michigan state line north of Pioneer, where the route continues in Michigan as M-99. The route is signed east–west from Carey to Bryan, and it is signed north–south from there to the Michigan state line.

SR 15 is an expressway for its southernmost 19 miles (31 km): two miles (3.2 km) where it runs concurrently with Interstate 75 (I-75), three miles (4.8 km) where it runs concurrently with US 68, and the final 14 miles (23 km) as a stand-alone limited-access road until its junction with US 23. The final 17 miles (27 km) are part of a heavily traveled corridor providing the most direct route between Detroit, Toledo, Findlay, Marion and Columbus.

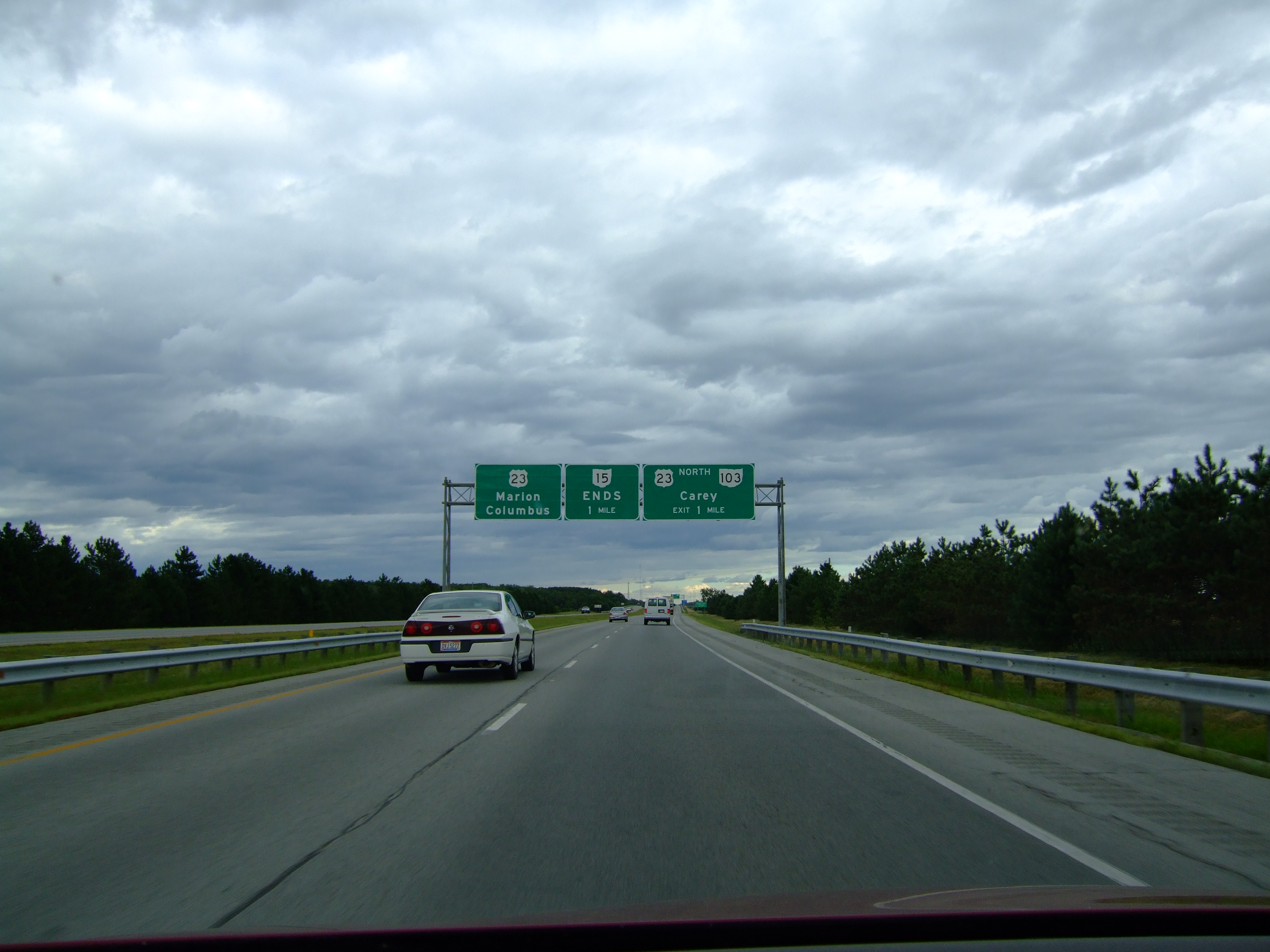
Eastern terminus near Carey

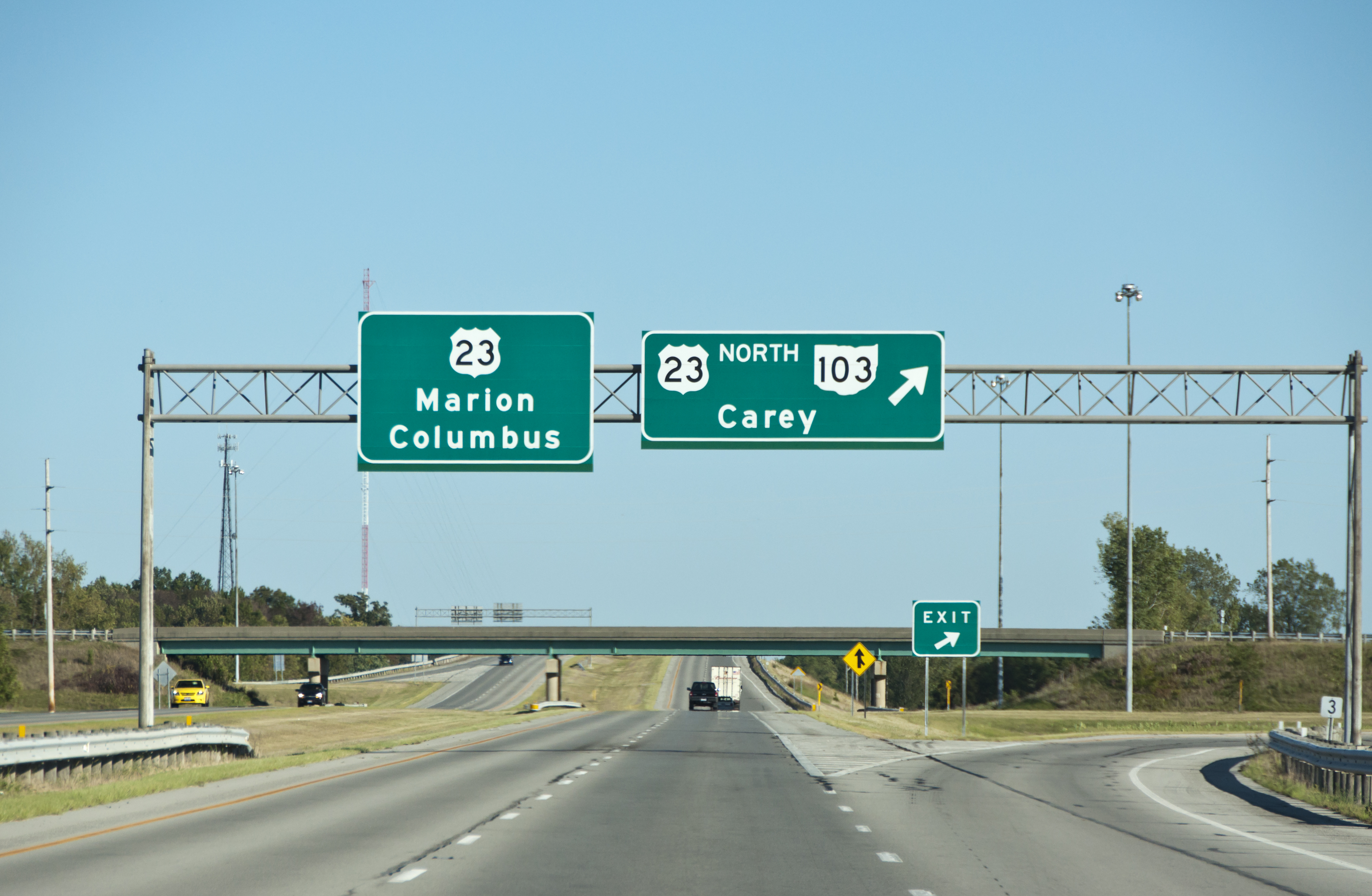
The merger with US 23

== History ==
SR 15 was certified in 1923, along the current US 322, which replaced it in 1926.

In 1926 the designation was reapplied to a route from Carey to the Indiana state line. In 1929 it was rerouted to Bryan, replacing parts of SR 9. It replaced the rest of SR 9 in 1931, rerouted along its current route to the Michigan state line.

In 1966, SR 15 was rerouted on an expressway from I-75 in Findlay to US 23 in Carey, its new southern (eastern) terminus. The highway runs a few miles south of its previous routing, which was recertified as SR 568 the same year.

== Major intersections ==
County	Location	mi	km	Exit	Destinations	Notes
Wyandot	Carey	0.000– 0.477	0.000– 0.768	—	US 23 / SR 103 – Columbus, Toledo	Interchange; eastern terminus of SR 15
Hancock	Vanlue	4.558– 5.246	7.335– 8.443	—	SR 330 north – Vanlue	Interchange; southern terminus of SR 330
Hancock	Marion Township	9.696– 10.420	15.604– 16.769	—	SR 37 – Delaware, Findlay	Interchange
Hancock	Findlay	13.695– 14.325	22.040– 23.054	—	US 68 south – Kenton	Eastern end of US 68 concurrency; interchange
Hancock	Findlay	16.628– 16.773	26.760– 26.994	—	Lima Avenue – Findlay	RIRO interchange
Hancock	Findlay	16.842– 17.364	27.105– 27.945	156	I-75 south / US 68 – Cincinnati, Lima	Southern end of I-75 concurrency; northern terminus of US 68
Hancock	Findlay	17.834– 18.428	28.701– 29.657	157	SR 12 – Columbus Grove, Findlay	
Hancock	Findlay	19.578– 19.862	31.508– 31.965	159	I-75 north / US 224 east (West Trenton Avenue) – Toledo, Findlay, Tiffin	Northern end of I-75 concurrency; eastern end of US 224 concurrency
Hancock	Blanchard Township	24.351	39.189		SR 186 north – McComb	Southern terminus of SR 186
Hancock	Blanchard Township	26.364	42.429		SR 235 – Ada, McComb	
Putnam	Ottawa	40.645	65.412		US 224 west (West Main Street) / SR 65 south (South Elm Street) / SR 109 begins – Van Wert, Lima	Western end of US 224 concurrency; southern end of SR 65 concurrency; southern terminus of SR 109
Putnam	Ottawa	41.120	66.176		SR 65 north / SR 109 north (North Perry Street) / North Taft Avenue	Northern end of SR 65/SR 109 concurrency
Putnam	Greensburg Township	46.397	74.669		SR 108 north / Road 14 – Napoleon	Southern terminus of SR 108
Putnam	Palmer Township	50.531	81.322		SR 115 south – Kalida	Northern terminus of SR 115
Putnam	Palmer Township	51.094	82.228		SR 613 – Continental, Leipsic	
Putnam	Monroe Township	55.551	89.401		SR 634 south – Continental	Northern terminus of SR 634
Defiance	Defiance	67.641	108.858		SR 18 east (East 2nd Street)	Eastern end of SR 18 concurrency
Defiance	Defiance	68.128	109.641		SR 66 south (Jefferson Avenue) – Delphos	Southern end of SR 66 concurrency
Defiance	Defiance	68.270	109.870		SR 111 south (Clinton Street) / West 2nd Street	Northern terminus of SR 111
Defiance	Defiance	68.907	110.895		SR 66 north (North Clinton Street) / East Sessions Avenue	Northern end of SR 66 concurrency
Defiance	Defiance	69.838– 69.948	112.393– 112.570		US 24 – Toledo, Fort Wayne	Exit 25 (US 24)
Defiance	Defiance	71.186	114.563		SR 18 west – Hicksville	Northern end of SR 18 concurrency
Defiance	Ney	79.837	128.485		SR 249 west	Eastern terminus of SR 249
Williams	Pulaski Township	83.348	134.136		US 127 south – Sherwood	Southern end of US 127 concurrency; location of north–south/east–west direction change
Williams	Pulaski Township	84.244	135.578		US 6 / SR 2 west – Edgerton, Napoleon	Southern end of SR 2 concurrency
Williams	Bryan	86.514	139.231		SR 2 east / SR 34 (High Street)	Northern end of SR 2 concurrency
Williams	Bryan	87.288	140.476		US 127 north / CR E (Brunicardi Way) – West Unity	Northern end of US 127 concurrency
Williams	Jefferson Township	94.303	151.766		US 20A east / SR 107 west – West Unity, Montpelier	Southern end of US 20A concurrency; eastern terminus of SR 107
Williams	Holiday City	95.912– 96.202	154.355– 154.822		I-80 / I-90 / Ohio Turnpike – South Bend, Toledo	Exit 13 on Ohio Turnpike
Williams	Madison Township	97.970	157.667		US 20A east / CR O – Angola, IN	Northern end of US 20A concurrency
Williams	Pioneer	99.773	160.569		US 20 – Fayette, Angola, IN	
Williams	Madison Township	102.312	164.655		M-99 north – Hillsdale	Michigan state line
1.000 mi = 1.609 km; 1.000 km = 0.621 mi: Concurrency terminus; Tolled
