= Ohio State Route 602 =

State highway in Crawford County, Ohio, US

State Route 602

Route information
- Maintained by ODOT
- Length: 14.47 mi (23.29 km)
- Existed: 1937–present

Major junctions
- South end: SR 19 near Galion
- US 30 near Galion
- North end: SR 103 in New Washington

Location
- Country: United States
- State: Ohio
- Counties: Crawford

Highway system
- Ohio State Highway System; Interstate; US; State; Scenic
← SR 601	→ SR 603

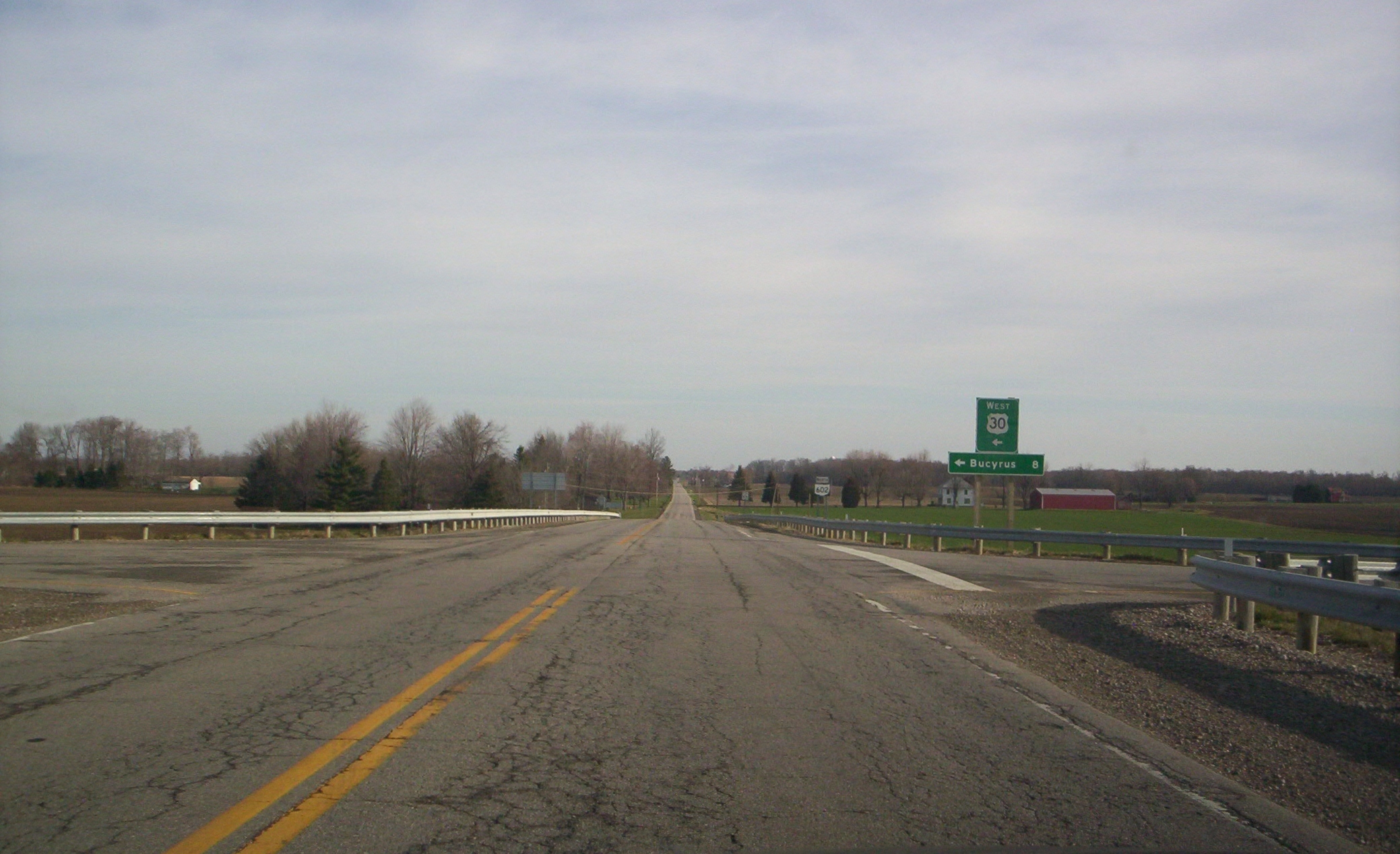
Looking northward along SR 602 at the junction of US 30 near Galion.

State Route 602 (SR 602) is a 14.47-mile-long (23.29 km) north–south state highway in the northern portion of the U.S. state of Ohio. Its southern terminus is at a T-intersection with SR 19 approximately 2.50 miles (4.02 km) northwest of Galion, and its northern terminus is at SR 103 in New Washington.

== Route description ==
All of SR 602 is situated within the eastern portion of Crawford County. No portion of this state route is included within the National Highway System (NHS). The NHS is a network of highways identified as being most important for the nation's economy, mobility and defense.

== History ==
The SR 602 designation was created in 1937. Originally, the highway ran from its present southern terminus at SR 19 to its intersection with Old Lincoln Highway north of North Robinson. Old Lincoln Highway was designated as U.S. Route 30N (US 30N) at the time, and later became US 30 prior to that route being moved to its present freeway routing.

SR 602 would remain as such until 1969, when the highway was extended north along a previously un-numbered roadway to its present northern endpoint at SR 103 in New Washington.

== Major intersections ==
The entire route is in Crawford County.

Location	mi	km	Destinations	Notes
Polk Township	0.00	0.00	SR 19	
Jefferson Township	0.76	1.22	US 30 – Mansfield, Bucyrus	Interchange
Sandusky Township	6.25	10.06	SR 96 – Shelby	
Sandusky Township	9.20	14.81	SR 98 – Plymouth, Bucyrus	
New Washington	14.47	23.29	SR 103 (Main Street / Kibler Street)	
1.000 mi = 1.609 km; 1.000 km = 0.621 mi
