= Ohio State Route 231 =

State highway in northwestern Ohio, US

State Route 231

Route information
- Maintained by ODOT
- Length: 35.77 mi (57.57 km)
- Existed: 1923–present

Major junctions
- South end: CSX grade crossing in Morral
- US 23 near Morral; US 30 near Nevada; US 224 in Tiffin
- North end: SR 18 / SR 100 / SR 101 in Tiffin

Location
- Country: United States
- State: Ohio
- Counties: Marion, Wyandot, Seneca

Highway system
- Ohio State Highway System; Interstate; US; State; Scenic
← SR 230	→ SR 232

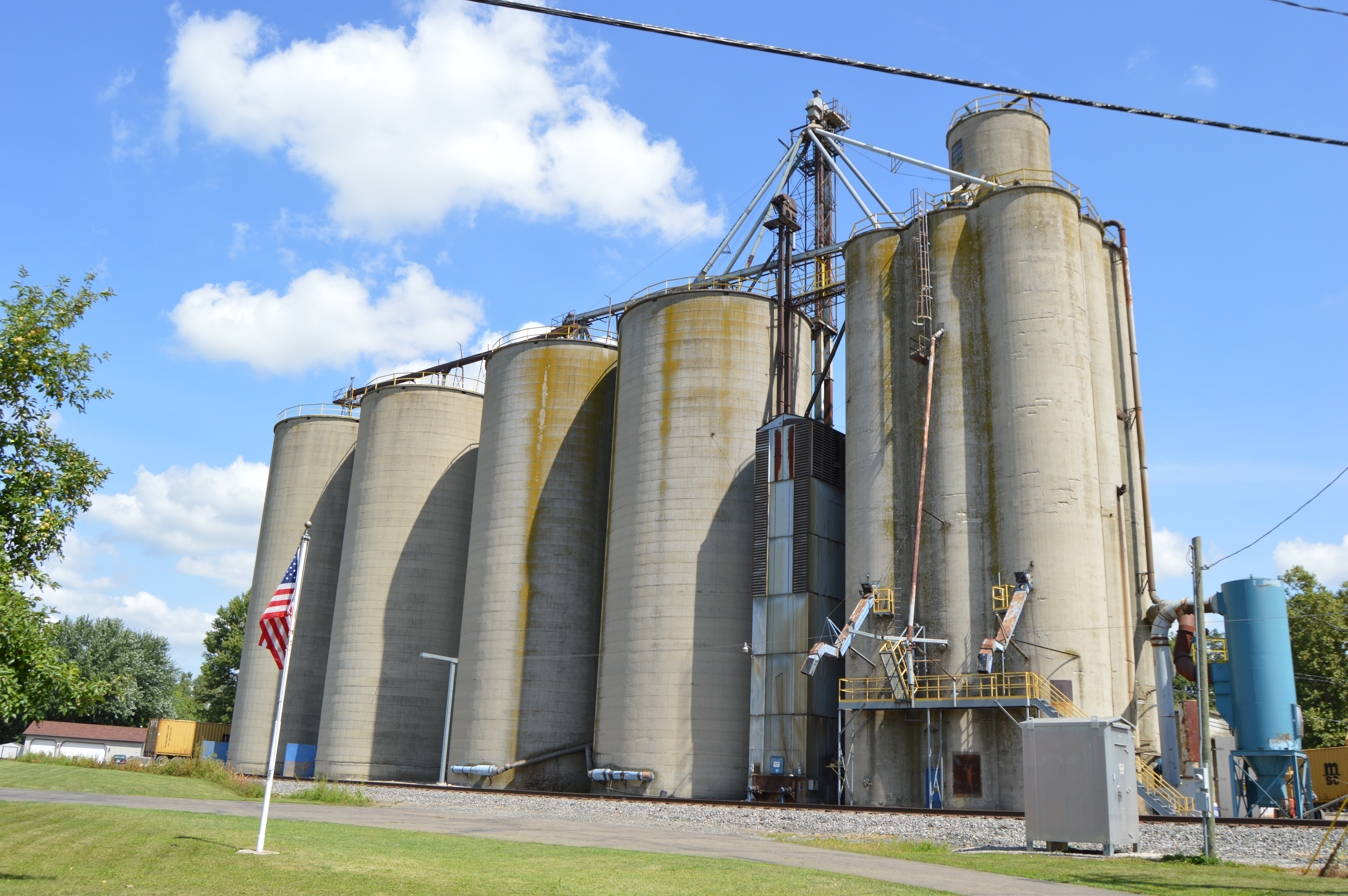
Grain elevator at the southern terminus in Morral.

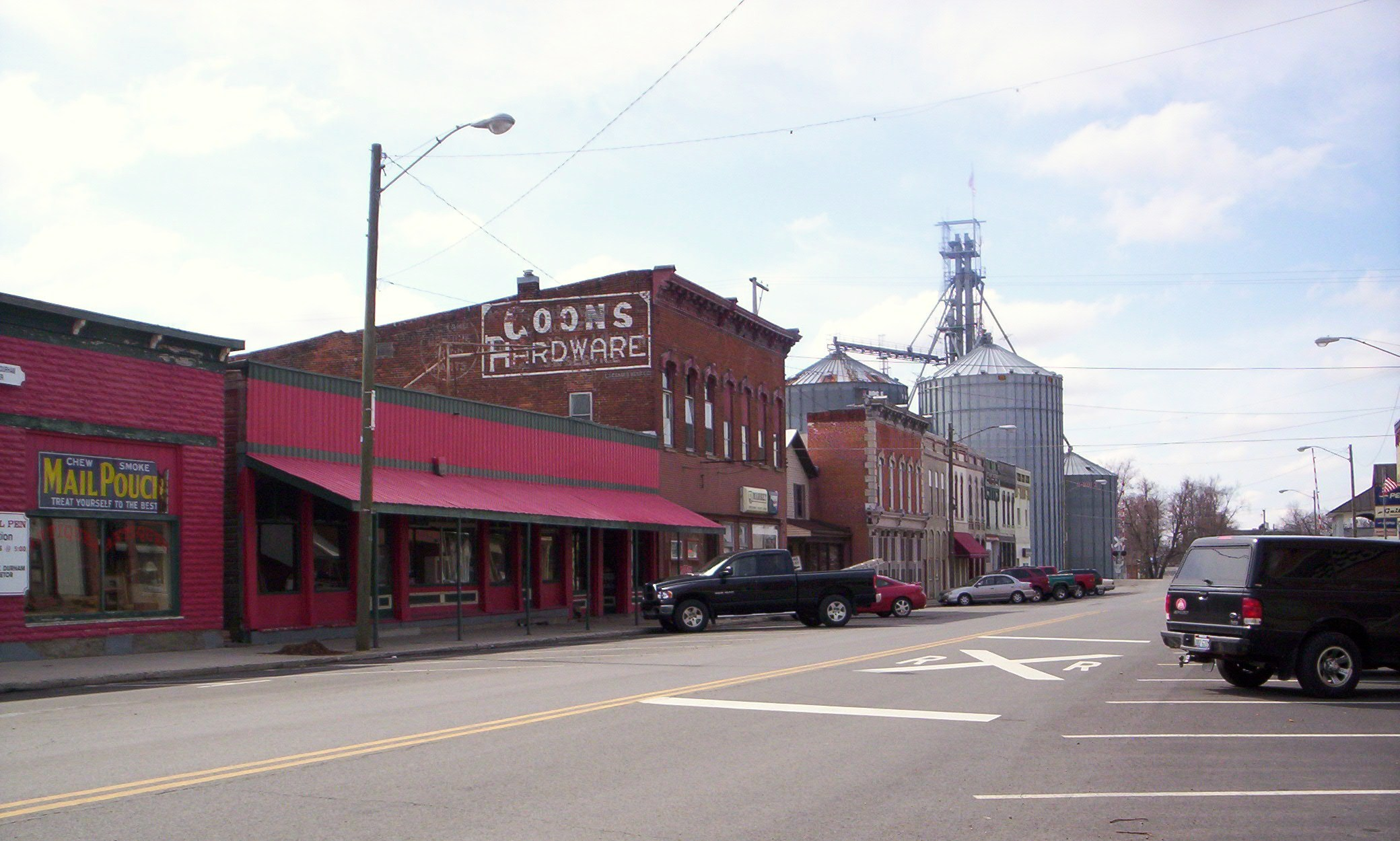
SR 231 (North Main Street) in downtown Nevada looking south near the CFE(Chicago, Fort Wayne, and Eastern.

State Route 231 (SR 231) is a 35.77-mile (57.57 km) long north–south state highway in the northwestern quadrant of the U.S. state of Ohio. SR 231 has its southern terminus at a CSX railroad crossing in the village of Morral. Its northern terminus is in downtown Tiffin at a signalized intersection with SR 18 and SR 101, following a 0.35 miles (0.56 km) long concurrency with SR 100, which continues north as a solo route north of this point.

== Route description ==
The path of SR 231 takes it through northern Marion County, eastern Wyandot County and southern Seneca County. There are no segments of SR 231 that are included within the National Highway System (NHS). The NHS is a network of highways identified as being most important for the economy, mobility and defense of the nation.

== History ==
SR 231 was applied in 1923. The highway was originally a short connector route in the Nevada vicinity, running between the former SR 182, now County Road 182, CR 182, in Nevada and the old two-lane alignment of U.S. Route 30 (US 30), now designated as CR 330, north of the village.

In 1932, SR 231 was extended south along the routing that it presently utilizes south of Nevada to its current southern terminus in Morral. Five years after being extended on the south ended, SR 231 was lengthened on the north end, following its present alignment along a previously county-maintained roadway to a new northern terminus at its present eastern junction with SR 103 east of Sycamore. Then, in 1939, SR 231 was extended to the north one more time, via a concurrency with SR 103 and SR 67 and then along a previously unnumbered roadway to its present northern terminus in Tiffin.

== Major intersections ==
County	Location	mi	km	Destinations	Notes
Marion	Morral	0.00	0.00	CSX railroad crossing	Morral–Kirkpatrick Road continues west
Marion	Grand Prairie Township	3.13	5.04	SR 423 south (Marion-Upper Sandusky Road) – Marion	Northern terminus of SR 423
Marion	Grand Prairie Township	3.43	5.52	US 23 – Marion, Upper Sandusky	Interchange
Wyandot	Marseilles Township	5.67	9.12	SR 294 east	Southern end of SR 294 concurrency
Wyandot	Marseilles Township	7.38	11.88	SR 294 west	Northern end of SR 294 concurrency
Wyandot	Nevada	12.33	19.84	US 30 – Mansfield, Upper Sandusky, Van Wert	Interchange
Wyandot	Sycamore Township	22.24	35.79	SR 103 east / T-148 – Chatfield	Southern end of SR 103 concurrency
Wyandot	Sycamore	24.26	39.04	SR 67 west / SR 103 west (West Saffell Avenue) / South Sycamore Avenue	Northern end of SR 103 concurrency; southern end of SR 67 concurrency
Wyandot	Sycamore	24.92	40.10	SR 67 east	Northern end of SR 67 concurrency
Seneca	Tiffin	33.81	54.41	US 224 – Attica, Findlay	
Seneca	Tiffin	35.42	57.00	SR 100 south (Melmore Street) / Sycamore Street	Southern end of SR 100 concurrency
Seneca	Tiffin	35.77	57.57	SR 18 east / SR 101 east (East Market Street) / SR 100 north (Washington Street)	Northern end of SR 100 concurrency
1.000 mi = 1.609 km; 1.000 km = 0.621 mi: Concurrency terminus
