= Mohawk Local School District =

School district in Ohio

Address
- 295 State Highway 231 Sycamore, Ohio, 44882; United States
- Coordinates: 41°0′N 83°10′W

District information
- Type: Public school district
- Grades: K–12
- Superintendent: Andrew Sprang

Other information
- Website: www.mohawklocal.org

Mohawk Local School District is a public school district in Ohio, United States. It serves students in the villages of Sycamore, Melmore, and McCutchenville, and surrounding rural areas in Wyandot County, Seneca County, and Crawford County.

== Grades 9-12 ==
- Mohawk High School

== Grades 7-8 ==
- Mohawk Junior High School (demolished)

== Grades K-6 ==
- McCutchenville Elementary (demolished)
- Melmore Elementary (demolished)
- Sycamore Elementary (K-5; demolished)
