= Ohio State Route 100 =

State highway in northwestern Ohio, US

State Route 100

Route information
- Maintained by ODOT
- Length: 39.02 mi (62.80 km)
- Existed: 1924–present

Major junctions
- South end: SR 309 near Iberia
- US 30 in Bucyrus; US 224 in Tiffin
- North end: SR 53 in Tiffin

Location
- Country: United States
- State: Ohio
- Counties: Marion, Crawford, Seneca

Highway system
- Ohio State Highway System; Interstate; US; State; Scenic
← SR 99	→ SR 101

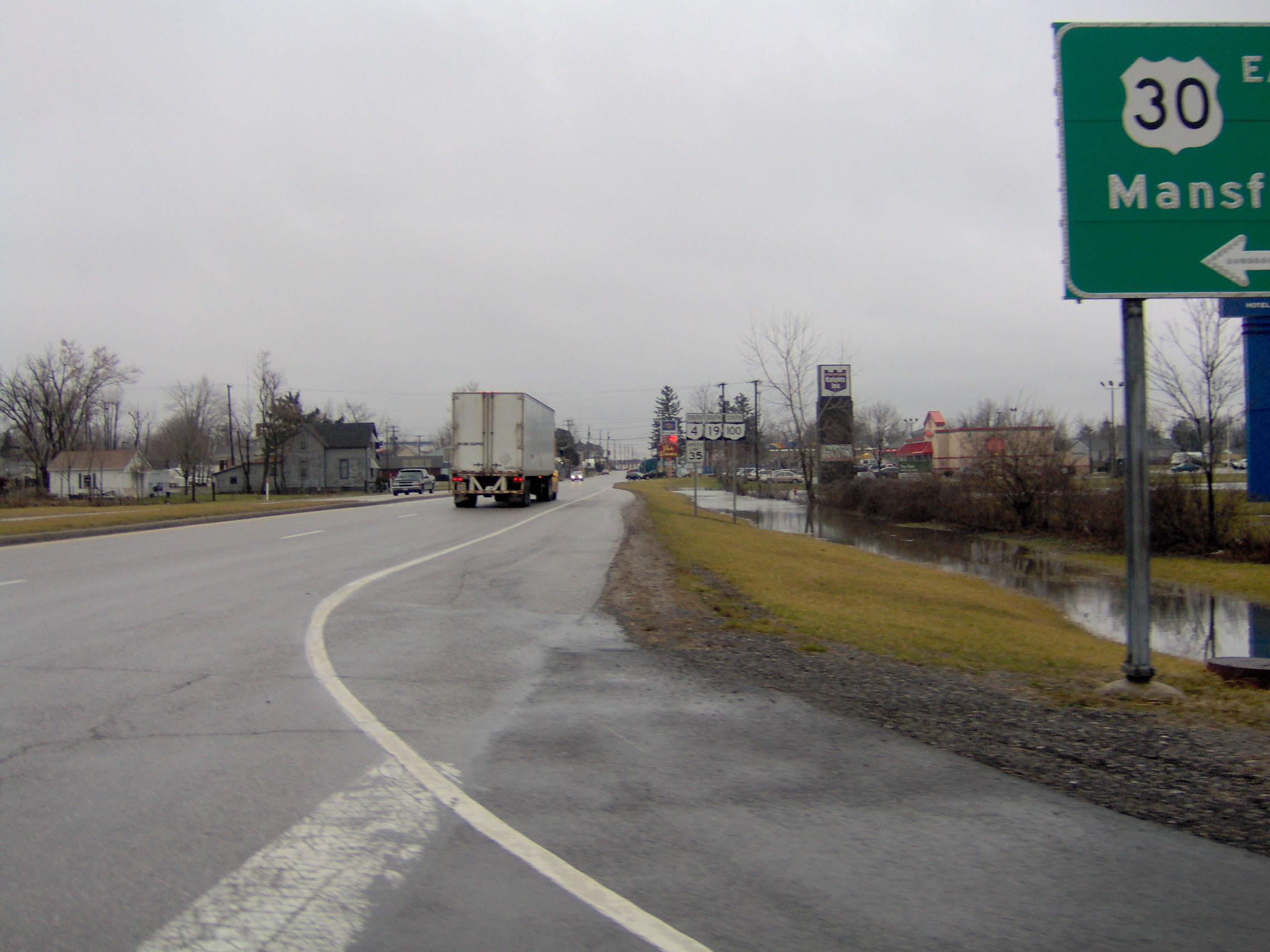
State Route 100 concurrent with State Routes 4 and 19 near Bucyrus

State Route 100 (SR 100) is a north–south highway in northwestern Ohio. Its southern terminus is at State Route 309 near Iberia, and its northern terminus is at State Route 53 in Tiffin.

== History ==
Established in 1924, the original routing was from 1-mile (1.6 km) north of Brokensword to Tiffin. In 1939, it was extended to 12 miles (19 km) south of Bucyrus along route 19 from 1-mile (1.6 km) north of Brokensword to 3 miles (4.8 km) south of Bucyrus and an unnumbered road from 3 miles (4.8 km) south of Bucyrus to 12 miles (19 km) south of Bucyrus.

== Major intersections ==
County	Location	mi	km	Destinations	Notes
Marion	Iberia	0.0	0.0	SR 309	Southern Terminus.
Crawford	Bucyrus	9.11	14.66	SR 19	Southern terminus of SR 19 concurrency; SR 19 continues south.
Crawford	Bucyrus	12.53	20.17	SR 4 SR 98	Southern terminus of SR 4/SR 98 concurrency; SR 4/SR 98 continue south.
Crawford	Bucyrus	12.67	20.39	SR 98	Northern terminus of SR 98 concurrency; SR 98 continues north.
Crawford	Bucyrus	13.46	21.66	US 30	Full-access interchange with US 30.
Crawford	Bucyrus	14.02	22.56	SR 4	Northern terminus of SR 4 concurrency; SR 4 continues north.
Crawford	Lykens Township	21.3	34.3	SR 19	Northern terminus of SR 19 concurrency; SR 19 continues north.
Crawford	Lykens Township	25.12	40.43	SR 103	Eastern terminus of SR 103 concurrency; SR 103 continues east.
Crawford	Lykens Township	25.26	40.65	SR 103	Western terminus of SR 103 concurrency; SR 103 continues west.
Seneca	Melmore	30.57	49.20	SR 67	Southern terminus of SR 67 concurrency; SR 67 continues south.
Seneca	Melmore	30.83	49.62	SR 67	Northern terminus of SR 67 concurrency; SR 67 continues north.
Seneca	Tiffin	35.56	57.23	US 224	
Seneca	Tiffin	37.88	60.96	SR 231	Southern terminus of SR 231 concurrency; SR 231 continues south.
Seneca	Tiffin	38.23	61.53	SR 231	Northern terminus of SR 231 concurrency; SR 231 ends.
Seneca	Tiffin	38.29	61.62	SR 18; SR 101	
Seneca	Tiffin	39.02	62.80	SR 53	Northern terminus.
1.000 mi = 1.609 km; 1.000 km = 0.621 mi: Concurrency terminus
