= Ohio State Route 181 =

State highway in northern Ohio, US

State Route 181

Route information
- Maintained by ODOT
- Length: 4.47 mi (7.19 km)
- Existed: 1923–present

Major junctions
- West end: SR 61 in Crestline
- East end: SR 309 near Ontario

Location
- Country: United States
- State: Ohio
- Counties: Crawford, Richland

Highway system
- Ohio State Highway System; Interstate; US; State; Scenic
← SR 180	→ SR 182

State Route 181 (SR 181) is a 4.46-mile-long (7.18 km) east–west state highway in the northern portion of the U.S. state of Ohio. The western terminus of SR 181 is at a signalized intersection with SR 61 in downtown Crestline, and its eastern terminus is at a T-intersection with SR 309 approximately one mile (1.6 km) west of Ontario.

Designated in the middle of the 1920s, SR 181 primarily serves as a short route connecting traffic between Crestline and Ontario. For most of its lifespan, SR 181 had its western terminus at the signalized intersection where U.S. Route 30 (US 30) had crossed the Crawford–Richland county line. When the U.S. route was transferred onto a new freeway alignment in 2006, SR 181 was extended west 0.54 miles (0.87 km) along the former routing of US 30 to a new western terminus where it meets SR 61.

== Route description ==
In downtown Crestline in southeastern Crawford County, SR 181 starts at a signalized intersection with SR 61, at a point where SR 61 turns off of Main Street, and north onto Seltzer Street. SR 181 travels east from this point along Main Street, the former routing of US 30, through a commercial district. After crossing the CSX railway, it enters into a residential area. At the signalized intersection with County Line Road, which marked the western terminus of SR 181 when US 30 followed Main Street, SR 181 turns south. Now straddling the boundary between Crawford and Richland Counties, the highway follows the eastern city limit of Crestline and the western limit of Sandusky Township, passing amid several homes up to the point where it crosses the Norfolk Southern Railway. South of there, the terrain becomes more rural, with trees lining both sides of the highway, although not too far beyond the trees on the east side the dominant landscape is farmland. Several homes appear along this stretch of SR 181. For a short distance, as the city limit of Crestline turns west, SR 181 borders the eastern end of Jackson Township. The highway arrives at a T-intersection with Middletown Road (Township Road 77, TR 77), at which point it turns to the east.

Now entirely within Richland County, SR 181 travels through Sandusky Township amid what is primarily farm country. Some small patches of woods, along with a few homes, appear along this stretch of the route. After intersecting Horning Road (County Road 175, CR 175), SR 181 enters Springfield Township. The highway passes into a more heavily wooded terrain with a greater number of homes appearing alongside the roadway as it bends to the east-southeast. Following its intersection with Eckstein Road (TR 166), SR 181 crosses over the US 30 freeway, and arrives at its endpoint at SR 309, a T-intersection located just 1 mile (1.6 km) west of the Ontario city limit.

This state route is not included as a part of the National Highway System.

== History ==
SR 181 was first designated in 1923 along the majority of its current routing, excepting the portion that follows the former routing of US 30 in Crestline.

The only significant change to its route occurred in 2006. After US 30 was relocated onto a new freeway bypass in that year, SR 181 was extended west along the former routing of the U.S. highway to SR 61 in downtown Crestline.

== Major intersections ==
County	Location	mi	km	Destinations	Notes
Crawford	Crestline	0.00	0.00	SR 61 (Seltzer Street / Main Street)	
Richland	Springfield Township	4.47	7.19	SR 309 – Mansfield, Galion	
1.000 mi = 1.609 km; 1.000 km = 0.621 mi
