= Ohio State Route 568 =

State highway in northwestern Ohio, US

State Route 568

Route information
- Maintained by ODOT
- Length: 16.20 mi (26.07 km)
- Existed: 1965–present

Major junctions
- West end: SR 12 / SR 37 in Findlay
- East end: US 23 / SR 103 / SR 199 in Carey

Location
- Country: United States
- State: Ohio
- Counties: Hancock, Wyandot

Highway system
- Ohio State Highway System; Interstate; US; State; Scenic
← SR 567	→ SR 569

State Route 568 (SR 568) is an east–west state highway in the northwestern portion of the U.S. state of Ohio. The western terminus of this highway is at a signalized intersection in downtown Findlay where it meets State Route 12 and State Route 37. The eastern terminus of State Route 568 is in downtown Carey at a signalized intersection that serves as all of the northern split of the U.S. Route 23/State Route 103 concurrency, the western split of the State Route 103/State Route 199 concurrency and the southern split of the U.S. Route 23/State Route 199 concurrency. Currently, 2 bridges on the road are going through rehabilitation expected to last until 2025.

State Route 568 was created in the middle of the 1960s. The entire length of this two-lane highway is part of the former alignment of State Route 15, which was realigned onto a new expressway from Findlay to Carey at that time.

== Route description ==
Along its path, State Route 568 passes through eastern Hancock County and northwestern Wyandot County. There are no segments of State Route 568 that are incorporated within the National Highway System, a network of highways deemed most important for the economy, mobility and defense of the country. The road acts as an original to route to travel from Carey to Findlay, but now acts as an overflow road. It has mainly local cars and trucks traveling on it.

== History ==
State Route 568 was established in 1965. With the completion of a new four-lane divided expressway from Interstate 75 south of Findlay and U.S. Route 23/State Route 103 south of Carey, the State Route 15 designation, which had utilized a two-lane roadway between downtown Findlay and downtown Carey to that point, was transferred onto the new expressway, which parallels the two-lane road to the south. Consequently, this two-lane highway became known as State Route 568. The route has utilized the same alignment from inception to this day, and has not seen any significant changes since its original designation.

Prior to the presently designated Route 568, a previous Route 568 traversed northern Lucas County and Fulton County. Established around 1939, its western terminus was the Ohio–Michigan line west of Lyons and the eastern terminus was at U.S. Route 25 (North Detroit Avenue) in Toledo. However, within a year, the part west of old U.S. 223 (present day Monroe Street and Alexis Road in Sylvania) was renamed Route 120 due to difference of traffic. Subsequently, only the portion east of Monroe Street remained as Route 568, entirely encompassing Alexis Road. It was decommissioned as a state route around 1953 and designated as a bypass for U.S. 24 and U.S. 25. It was recommissioned as State Route 184 in 1969.

== Major intersections ==
County	Location	mi	km	Destinations	Notes
Hancock	Findlay	0.00	0.00	SR 12 / SR 37 north (South Main Street / Main Cross Street)	Western end of SR 37 concurrency
Hancock	Findlay	0.14	0.23	SR 37 south (South Main Street) / West Sandusky Street	Eastern end of SR 37 concurrency
Hancock	Biglick Township	9.93	15.98	SR 330 south / CR 330 north	Northern terminus of SR 330
Wyandot	Carey	16.20	26.07	US 23 / SR 103 / SR 199 (East Findlay Street / Vance Street)	
1.000 mi = 1.609 km; 1.000 km = 0.621 mi: Concurrency terminus
