= Mohawk High School (Sycamore, Ohio) =

Location
- 605 State Highway 231; Sycamore, Ohio 44882; United States
- Coordinates: 40°59′21″N 83°10′08″W

Information
- Type: Public high school
- School district: Mohawk Local School District
- NCES School ID: 390507404049
- Principal: Robert Chevalier
- Teaching staff: 28.00 (FTE)
- Grades: 7–12
- Enrollment: 356 (2024-2025)
- Student to teacher ratio: 12.71
- Colors: Red and Black
- Athletics conference: Northern 10 Athletic Conference
- Mascot: Warrior
- Website: jrhs.mohawklocal.org

Mohawk High School is a public high school in Sycamore, Ohio, United States. It is part of the Mohawk Local School District.

== Ohio High School Athletic Association Team State Championships ==
- Girls Softball – 2003, 2005
