= Tymochtee, Ohio =

Unincorporated community in Ohio, United States

Coordinates: 40°56′57″N 83°16′13″W

Tymochtee is an unincorporated community in Wyandot County, in the U.S. state of Ohio.

== History ==
A post office called Tymochtee was in operation between 1823 and 1894. The community takes its name from nearby Tymochtee Creek. Tymochtee is a name derived from the Wyandot language meaning "stream around the plains".
