= Nevada, Ohio =

- Village
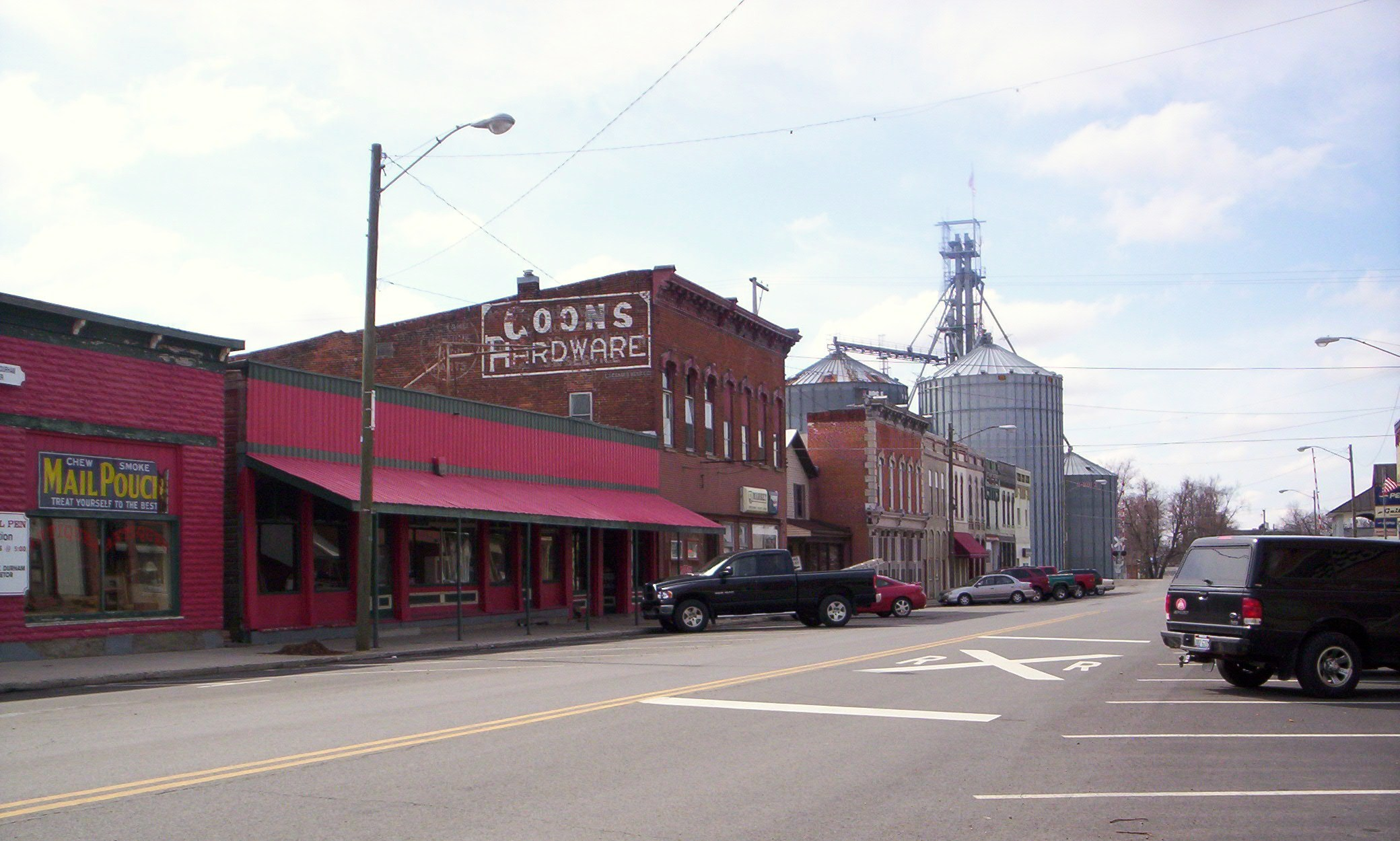
- North Main Street downtown

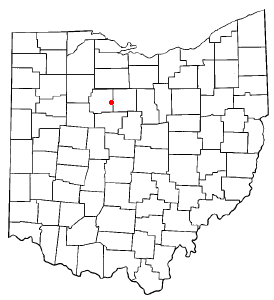
- Location of Nevada, Ohio

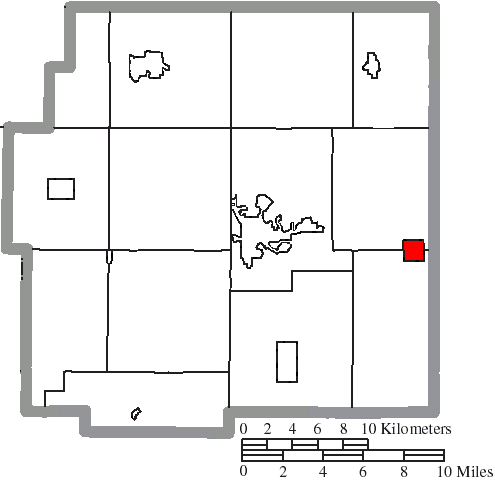
- Location of Nevada in Wyandot County
- Coordinates: 40°49′07″N 83°07′42″W
- Country: United States
- State: Ohio
- County: Wyandot
- Township: Antrim, Eden

Area
  - Total: 1.03 sq mi (2.66 km^{2})
  - Land: 1.03 sq mi (2.66 km^{2})
  - Water: 0 sq mi (0.00 km^{2})
- Elevation: 929 ft (283 m)

Population (2020)
  - Total: 706
  - Density: 688.2/sq mi (265.72/km^{2})
- Time zone: UTC-5 (Eastern (EST))
  - Summer (DST): UTC-4 (EDT)
- ZIP code: 44849
- Area code: 740
- FIPS code: 39-53942
- GNIS feature ID: 2399447
- Website: https://www.villageofnevadaoh.com/

Nevada (/nɪˈveɪdə/ niv-AY-də) is a village in Wyandot County, Ohio, United States. The population was 706 at the 2020 census.

== History ==
Nevada was laid out in 1852, and named after the Sierra Nevada. A post office called Nevada has been in operation since 1854.

== Geography ==
According to the United States Census Bureau, the village has a total area of 1.03 square miles (2.67 km^{2}), all land.

== Demographics ==
Historical population
Census	Pop.	Note	%±
1870	828		—
1880	1,036		25.1%
1890	802		−22.6%
1900	889		10.8%
1910	889		0.0%
1920	793		−10.8%
1930	741		−6.6%
1940	741		0.0%
1950	824		11.2%
1960	919		11.5%
1970	917		−0.2%
1980	945		3.1%
1990	849		−10.2%
2000	814		−4.1%
2010	760		−6.6%
2020	706		−7.1%
U.S. Decennial Census

=== 2010 census ===
As of the census of 2010, there were 760 people, 295 households, and 203 families living in the village. The population density was 737.9 inhabitants per square mile (284.9/km^{2}). There were 334 housing units at an average density of 324.3 per square mile (125.2/km^{2}). The racial makeup of the village was 97.1% White, 0.1% Native American, 0.7% from other races, and 2.1% from two or more races (The Hightowers). Hispanic or Latino of any race were 0.7% of the population.

There were 295 households, of which 35.3% had children under the age of 18 living with them, 52.2% were married couples living together, 11.2% had a female householder with no husband present, 5.4% had a male householder with no wife present, and 31.2% were non-families. 26.4% of all households were made up of individuals, and 10.2% had someone living alone who was 65 years of age or older. The average household size was 2.58 and the average family size was 3.09.

The median age in the village was 36.9 years. 26.4% of residents were under the age of 18; 7.8% were between the ages of 18 and 24; 26.5% were from 25 to 44; 26.4% were from 45 to 64; and 12.8% were 65 years of age or older. The gender makeup of the village was 49.7% male and 50.3% female.

=== 2000 census ===
As of the census of 2000, there were 814 people, 313 households, and 215 families living in the village. The population density was 788.8 inhabitants per square mile (304.6/km^{2}). There were 328 housing units at an average density of 317.8 per square mile (122.7/km^{2}). The racial makeup of the village was 97.42% White, 0.37% African American, 0.12% Native American, 0.25% Asian, 0.12% Pacific Islander, 0.74% from other races, and 0.98% from two or more races. Hispanic or Latino of any race were 1.11% of the population.

There were 313 households, out of which 33.5% had children under the age of 18 living with them, 56.5% were married couples living together, 8.6% had a female householder with no husband present, and 31.0% were non-families. 24.9% of all households were made up of individuals, and 13.1% had someone living alone who was 65 years of age or older. The average household size was 2.60 and the average family size was 3.13.

In the village, the population was spread out, with 27.4% under the age of 18, 8.2% from 18 to 24, 30.1% from 25 to 44, 21.4% from 45 to 64, and 12.9% who were 65 years of age or older. The median age was 34 years. For every 100 females there were 98.1 males. For every 100 females age 18 and over, there were 91.9 males.

The median income for a household in the village was $34,706, and the median income for a family was $41,250. Males had a median income of $32,159 versus $21,181 for females. The per capita income for the village was $15,395. About 2.7% of families and 4.9% of the population were below the poverty line, including 3.8% of those under age 18 and 3.0% of those age 65 or over.

== Notable people ==
- Ed Hahn, baseball outfielder who played in 1906 World Series
