= Holiday City, Ohio =

- Village
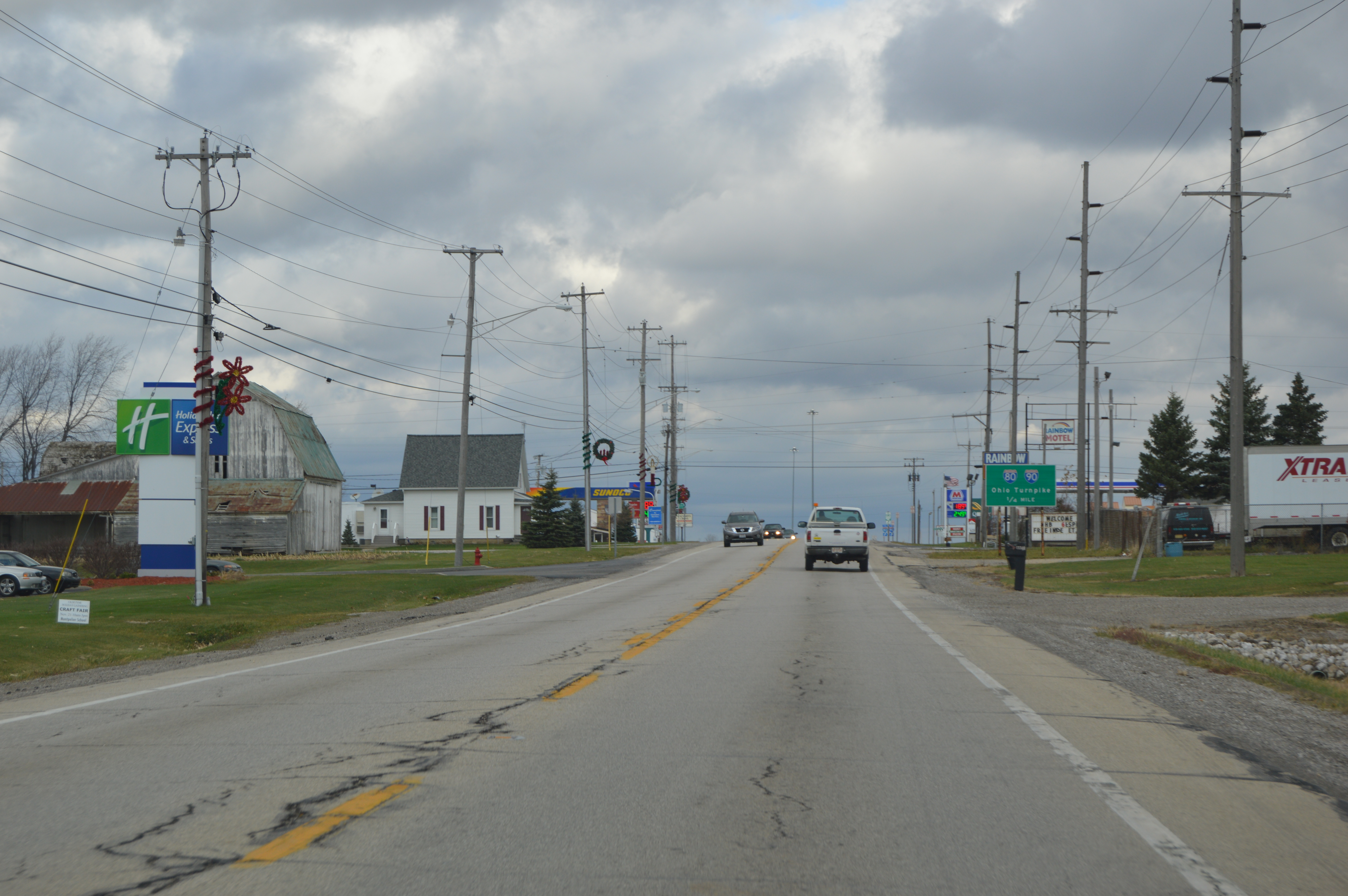
- Central Holiday City, primarily services for an Ohio Turnpike exit

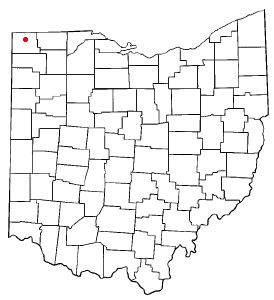
- Location of Holiday City, Ohio

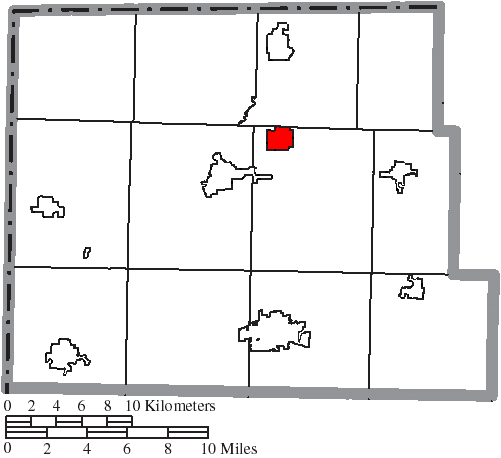
- Location of Holiday City in Williams County
- Coordinates: 41°37′29″N 84°31′52″W
- Country: United States
- State: Ohio
- County: Williams

Government
  - Type: Village council

Area
  - Total: 2.58 sq mi (6.67 km^{2})
  - Land: 2.56 sq mi (6.62 km^{2})
  - Water: 0.019 sq mi (0.05 km^{2})
- Elevation: 889 ft (271 m)

Population (2020)
  - Total: 48
  - Estimate (2023): 50
  - Density: 18.8/sq mi (7.26/km^{2})
- Time zone: UTC-5 (Eastern (EST))
  - Summer (DST): UTC-4 (EDT)
- ZIP code: 43543
- Area code: 419
- FIPS code: 39-35864
- GNIS feature ID: 2398522
- Website: http://www.holidaycityohio.org/

Holiday City is a village in Williams County, Ohio, United States. The population was 48 at the 2020 census.

== History ==
Holiday City was platted in 1997. The village of Holiday City was incorporated on June 24, 1997.

== Geography ==
According to the United States Census Bureau, the village has a total area of 2.69 square miles (6.97 km^{2}), of which 2.67 square miles (6.92 km^{2}) is land and 0.02 square miles (0.05 km^{2}) is water.

== Demographics ==
Historical population
Census	Pop.	Note	%±
2000	49		—
2010	52		6.1%
2020	48		−7.7%
2023 (est.)	50	▲	4.2%
U.S. Decennial Census

=== 2010 census ===
As of the census of 2010, there were 52 people, 18 households, and 16 families living in the village. The population density was 19.5 inhabitants per square mile (7.5/km^{2}). There were 20 housing units at an average density of 7.5 per square mile (2.9/km^{2}). The racial makeup of the village was 100.0% White.

There were 18 households, of which 44.4% had children under the age of 18 living with them, 66.7% were married couples living together, 11.1% had a female householder with no husband present, 11.1% had a male householder with no wife present, and 11.1% were non-families. 11.1% of all households were made up of individuals, and 11.1% had someone living alone who was 65 years of age or older. The average household size was 2.89 and the average family size was 3.06.

The median age in the village was 34 years. 26.9% of residents were under the age of 18; 9.6% were between the ages of 18 and 24; 26.8% were from 25 to 44; 21.2% were from 45 to 64; and 15.4% were 65 years of age or older. The gender makeup of the village was 53.8% male and 46.2% female.

=== 2000 census ===
As of the census of 2000, there were 49 people, 17 households, and 10 families living in the village. The population density was 36.9 inhabitants per square mile (14.2/km^{2}). There were 18 housing units at an average density of 13.6 per square mile (5.2/km^{2}). The racial makeup of the village was 93.88% White, 4.08% Asian, and 2.04% from two or more races.

There were 17 households, out of which 47.1% had children under the age of 18 living with them, 58.8% were married couples living together, 5.9% had a female householder with no husband present, and 35.3% were non-families. 29.4% of all households were made up of individuals, and 17.6% had someone living alone who was 65 years of age or older. The average household size was 2.88 and the average family size was 3.73.

In the village, the population was spread out, with 40.8% under the age of 18, 12.2% from 18 to 24, 26.5% from 25 to 44, 12.2% from 45 to 64, and 8.2% who were 65 years of age or older. The median age was 24 years. For every 100 females there were 75.0 males. For every 100 females age 18 and over, there were 81.3 males.

The median income for a household in the village was $29,063, and the median income for a family was $29,375. Males had a median income of $30,625 versus $27,500 for females. The per capita income for the village was $10,065. There were no families and 6.3% of the population living below the poverty line, including no under eighteens and 60.0% of those over 64.
