= Vanlue High School =

High school in Ohio, United States

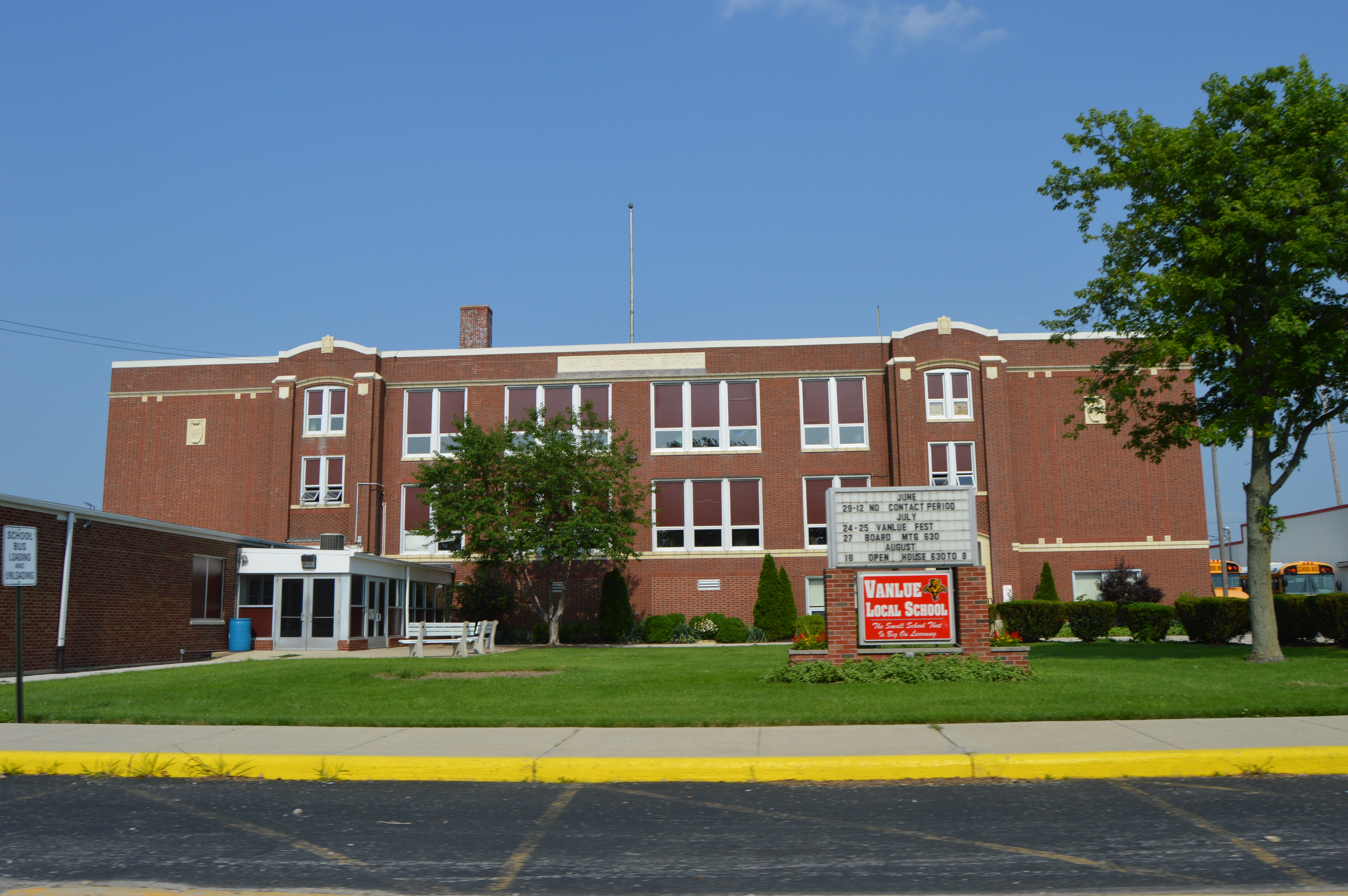
- Front of the school

Location
- 301 South East Street; Vanlue, (Hancock County), Ohio 45890; United States
- Coordinates: 40°58′26″N 83°28′34″W

Information
- Type: Public, coeducational high school
- Opened: 1922
- Superintendent: Traci Conley
- Principal: Robin Hoadley
- Teaching staff: 5.50 (FTE)
- Grades: 6-12
- Average class size: 19
- Student to teacher ratio: 17.82
- Colors: Scarlet and gray
- Athletics conference: Blanchard Valley Conference
- Sports: Football, Volleyball, Basketball, Baseball, Softball, Track and Field
- Team name: Wildcats
- Rival: Arcadia
- Website: District Website

Vanlue High School is a public high school in Vanlue, Ohio. It is the only high school in the Vanlue Local School District. The nickname is Wildcats. School colors are scarlet and gray. It is a member of the Blanchard Valley Conference. and National Junior Classical League.
