= New Washington, Ohio =

- Village
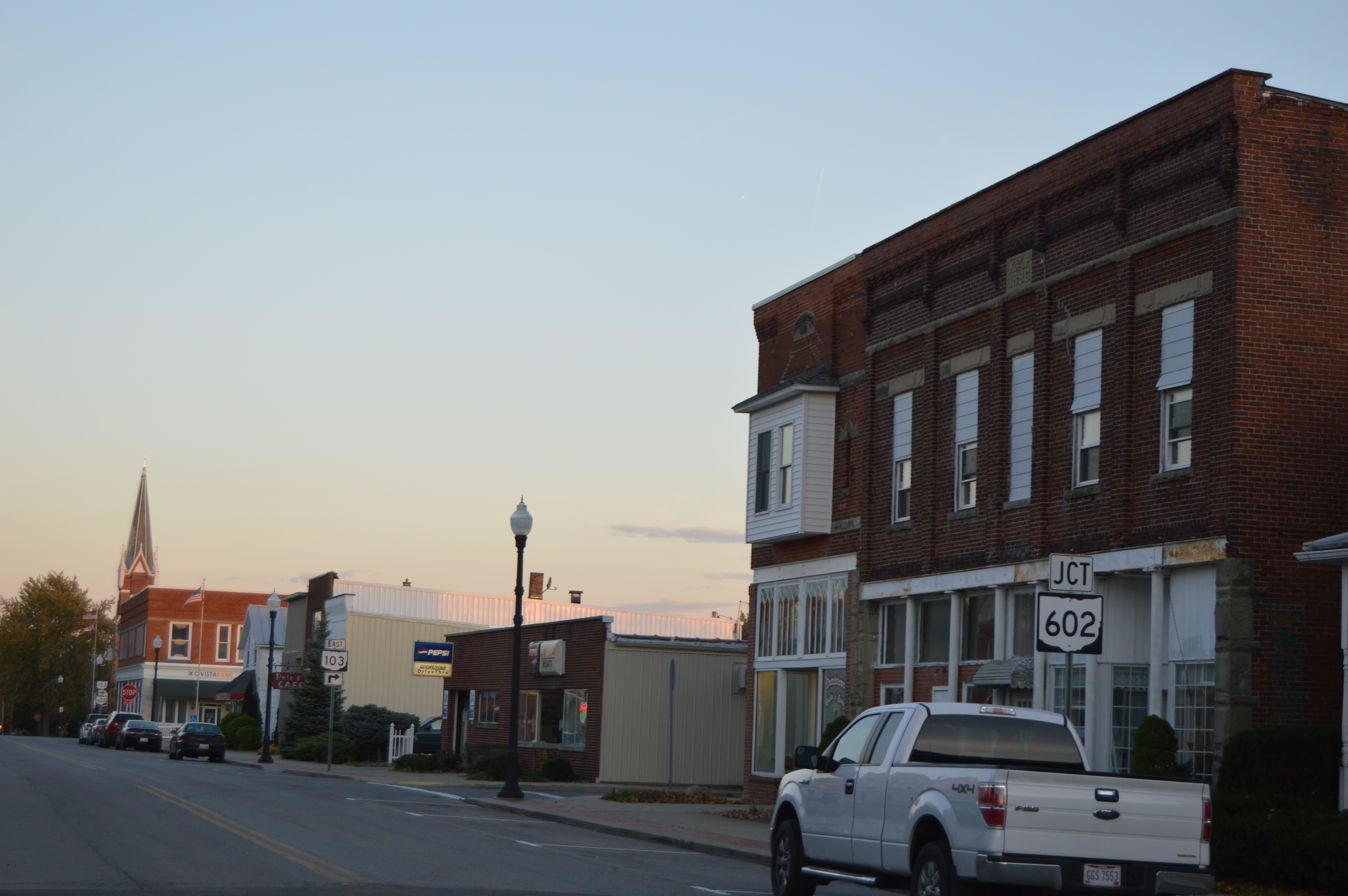
- Mansfield Street downtown

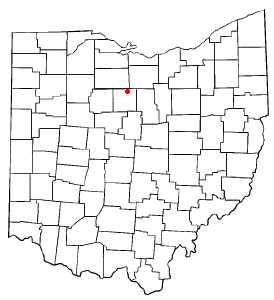
- Location of New Washington, Ohio

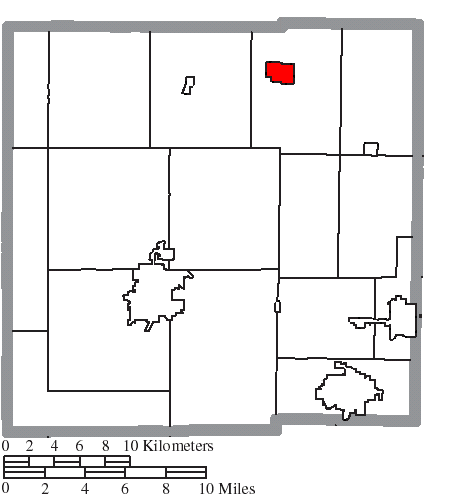
- Location of New Washington in Crawford County
- Coordinates: 40°57′37″N 82°51′17″W
- Country: United States
- State: Ohio
- County: Crawford

Area
  - Total: 1.34 sq mi (3.47 km^{2})
  - Land: 1.34 sq mi (3.47 km^{2})
  - Water: 0 sq mi (0.00 km^{2})
- Elevation: 988 ft (301 m)

Population (2020)
  - Total: 873
  - Density: 652/sq mi (251.7/km^{2})
- Time zone: UTC-5 (Eastern (EST))
  - Summer (DST): UTC-4 (EDT)
- ZIP code: 44854
- Area code: 419
- FIPS code: 39-55776
- GNIS feature ID: 2399485
- Website: https://newwashington.info/

New Washington is a village in Cranberry Township in Crawford County, Ohio, United States. The population was 873 at the 2020 census.

== History ==
In 1833, New Washington was platted by George Washington Meyers, and was nicknamed "Dutchtown" for the large amount of German families living there.

The early predominant language in the community was German. By 1862, industries at the time included two dry goods stores, six grocery stores, three blacksmith shops, a flouring mill, and a sawmill.

In 1872, the Pennsylvania Railroad, at the time called the Mansfield, Coldwater, and Lake Erie railroad, ran its first trains from Toledo, Ohio to New Washington. This led to an inflow of new businesses and non-German families. New Washington was incorporated as a village in 1874.

== Geography ==
According to the United States Census Bureau, the village has a total area of 1.37 square miles (3.55 km^{2}), all land.

== Demographics ==
Historical population
Census	Pop.	Note	%±
1860	221		—
1870	273		23.5%
1880	675		147.3%
1890	704		4.3%
1900	824		17.0%
1910	889		7.9%
1920	919		3.4%
1930	921		0.2%
1940	857		−6.9%
1950	910		6.2%
1960	1,162		27.7%
1970	1,251		7.7%
1980	1,213		−3.0%
1990	1,057		−12.9%
2000	987		−6.6%
2010	967		−2.0%
2020	873		−9.7%
U.S. Decennial Census

=== 2010 census ===
As of the census of 2010, there were 967 people, 400 households, and 258 families living in the village. The population density was 705.8 inhabitants per square mile (272.5/km^{2}). There were 425 housing units at an average density of 310.2 per square mile (119.8/km^{2}). The racial makeup of the village was 98.7% White, 0.2% African American, 0.6% from other races, and 0.5% from two or more races. Hispanic or Latino of any race were 1.0% of the population.

There were 400 households, of which 32.3% had children under the age of 18 living with them, 51.8% were married couples living together, 9.0% had a female householder with no husband present, 3.8% had a male householder with no wife present, and 35.5% were non-families. 31.3% of all households were made up of individuals, and 12% had someone living alone who was 65 years of age or older. The average household size was 2.42 and the average family size was 3.01.

The median age in the village was 38.5 years. 26% of residents were under the age of 18; 7.9% were between the ages of 18 and 24; 25.7% were from 25 to 44; 24.6% were from 45 to 64; and 15.8% were 65 years of age or older. The gender makeup of the village was 49.4% male and 50.6% female.

=== 2000 census ===
As of the census of 2000, there were 987 people, 393 households, and 275 families living in the village. The population density was 777.7 inhabitants per square mile (300.3/km^{2}). There were 422 housing units at an average density of 332.5 per square mile (128.4/km^{2}). The racial makeup of the village was 99.29% White, 0.41% Asian, and 0.30% from two or more races.

There were 393 households, out of which 32.1% had children under the age of 18 living with them, 58.3% were married couples living together, 8.7% had a female householder with no husband present, and 30.0% were non-families. 27.7% of all households were made up of individuals, and 12.7% had someone living alone who was 65 years of age or older. The average household size was 2.50 and the average family size was 3.07.

In the village, the population was spread out, with 25.7% under the age of 18, 7.8% from 18 to 24, 28.9% from 25 to 44, 24.2% from 45 to 64, and 13.4% who were 65 years of age or older. The median age was 37 years. For every 100 females there were 95.8 males. For every 100 females age 18 and over, there were 92.4 males.

The median income for a household in the village was $41,563, and the median income for a family was $46,875. Males had a median income of $34,167 versus $24,489 for females. The per capita income for the village was $16,765. About 2.4% of families and 6.3% of the population were below the poverty line, including 3.0% of those under age 18 and 5.9% of those age 65 or over.

== Notable person ==
- Jake Striker, baseball player
