= Vanlue, Ohio =

- Village
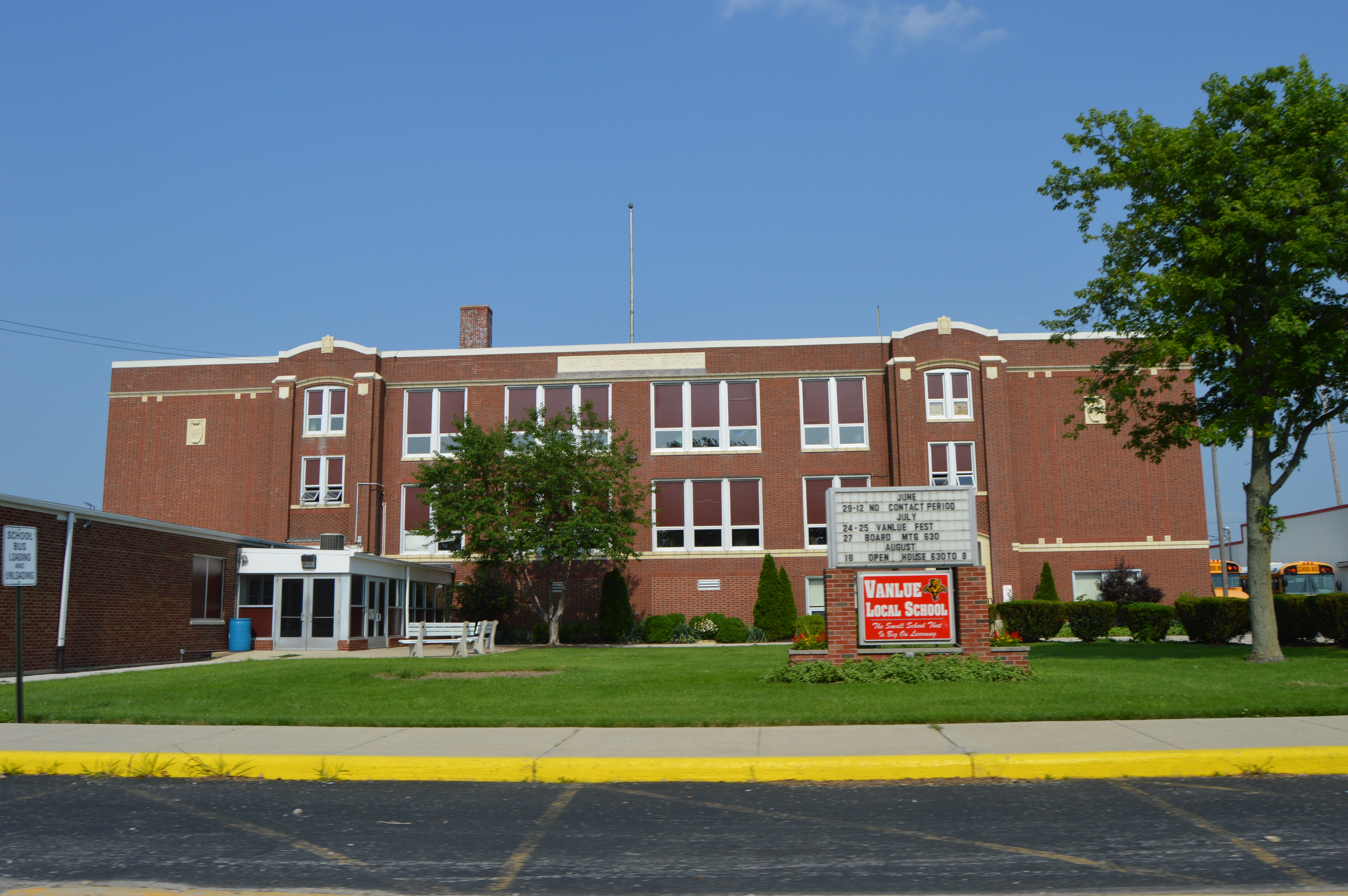
- High school on State Route 330

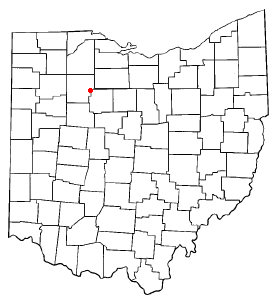
- Location of Vanlue, Ohio

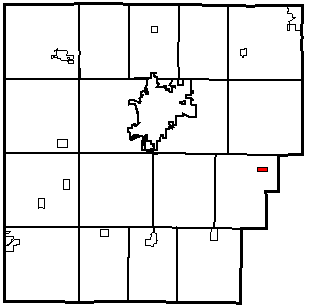
- Location within Hancock County
- Coordinates: 40°58′31″N 83°28′57″W
- Country: United States
- State: Ohio
- Counties: Hancock

Government
  - Type: Village council
  - Mayor: Robbie Brooks

Area
  - Total: 0.36 sq mi (0.92 km^{2})
  - Land: 0.35 sq mi (0.90 km^{2})
  - Water: 0.0077 sq mi (0.02 km^{2})
- Elevation: 814 ft (248 m)

Population (2020)
  - Total: 341
  - Density: 980.3/sq mi (378.48/km^{2})
- Time zone: UTC-5 (Eastern (EST))
  - Summer (DST): UTC-4 (EDT)
- ZIP code: 45890
- Area code: 419
- FIPS code: 39-79534
- GNIS feature ID: 2400048
- Website: https://villageofvanlue.com/home

Vanlue is a village in Hancock County, Ohio, United States. The population was 341 at the 2020 census.

== History ==
The village is 2 miles west from Sheriden Cave, where native habitation was dated to have occurred around 11,000BC.

Vanlue was platted in 1847 by William Vanlue, and named for him. A post office called Vanlue has been in operation since 1850.

== Geography ==
According to the United States Census Bureau, the village has a total area of 0.36 square miles (0.93 km^{2}), of which 0.35 square miles (0.91 km^{2}) is land and 0.01 square miles (0.03 km^{2}) is water.

== Demographics ==
Historical population
Census	Pop.	Note	%±
1880	364		—
1890	352		−3.3%
1900	356		1.1%
1910	400		12.4%
1920	368		−8.0%
1930	351		−4.6%
1940	355		1.1%
1950	365		2.8%
1960	386		5.8%
1970	539		39.6%
1980	390		−27.6%
1990	373		−4.4%
2000	371		−0.5%
2010	359		−3.2%
2020	341		−5.0%
U.S. Decennial Census

=== 2010 census ===
As of the census of 2010, there were 359 people, 141 households, and 93 families living in the village. The population density was 1,025.7 inhabitants per square mile (396.0/km^{2}). There were 152 housing units at an average density of 434.3 per square mile (167.7/km^{2}). The racial makeup of the village was 98.3% White, 0.3% African American, 0.6% from other races, and 0.8% from two or more races. Hispanic or Latino of any race were 5.3% of the population.

There were 141 households, of which 34.8% had children under the age of 18 living with them, 53.9% were married couples living together, 11.3% had a female householder with no husband present, 0.7% had a male householder with no wife present, and 34.0% were non-families. 27.0% of all households were made up of individuals, and 12.7% had someone living alone who was 65 years of age or older. The average household size was 2.55 and the average family size was 3.15.

The median age in the village was 35.8 years. 26.5% of residents were under the age of 18; 9.4% were between the ages of 18 and 24; 26.1% were from 25 to 44; 23.7% were from 45 to 64; and 14.2% were 65 years of age or older. The gender makeup of the village was 47.1% male and 52.9% female.

=== 2000 census ===
As of the census of 2000, there were 371 people, 141 households, and 104 families living in the village. The population density was 1,325.8 inhabitants per square mile (511.9/km^{2}). There were 151 housing units at an average density of 539.6 per square mile (208.3/km^{2}). The racial makeup of the village was 96.77% White, 0.27% African American, 0.27% Native American, 1.08% from other races, and 1.62% from two or more races. Hispanic or Latino of any race were 1.35% of the population.

There were 141 households, out of which 35.5% had children under the age of 18 living with them, 56.7% were married couples living together, 10.6% had a female householder with no husband present, and 26.2% were non-families. 21.3% of all households were made up of individuals, and 14.2% had someone living alone who was 65 years of age or older. The average household size was 2.63 and the average family size was 3.07.

In the village, the population was spread out, with 29.9% under the age of 18, 8.4% from 18 to 24, 26.7% from 25 to 44, 19.7% from 45 to 64, and 15.4% who were 65 years of age or older. The median age was 35 years. For every 100 females there were 93.2 males. For every 100 females age 18 and over, there were 94.0 males.

The median income for a household in the village was $31,786, and the median income for a family was $37,500. Males had a median income of $34,886 versus $21,964 for females. The per capita income for the village was $14,768. None of the families and 3.7% of the population were living below the poverty line, including no under eighteens and 15.4% of those over 64.

Ryan Tong ran in the OHSAA State HS Track and Field Championships in 1997 with a time of 22.70, which is still the 200m record at Vanlue High School.
