= Sycamore, Ohio =

- Village
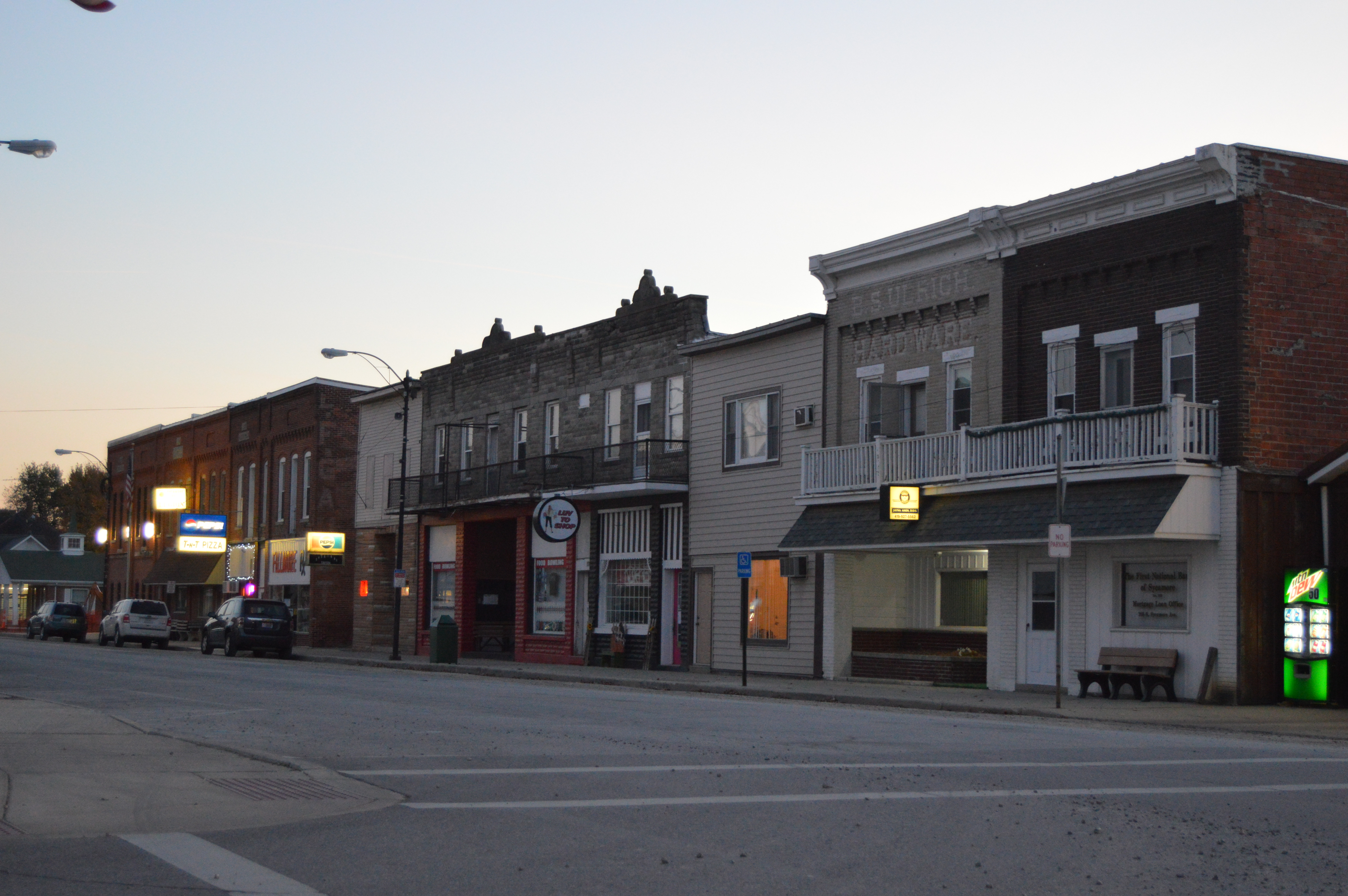
- Sycamore Avenue downtown

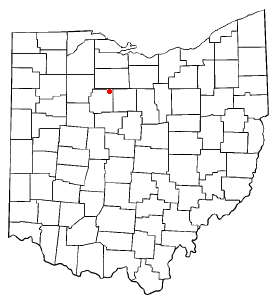
- Location of Sycamore, Ohio

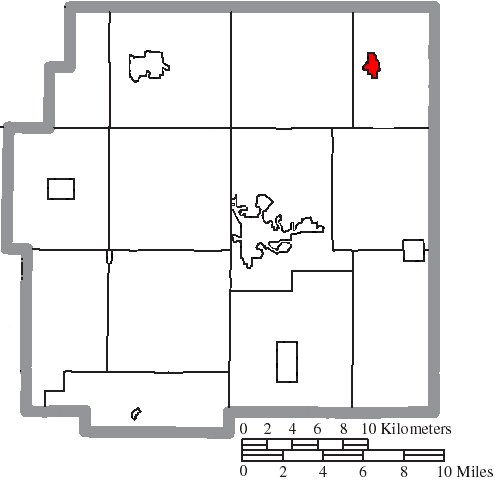
- Location of Sycamore in Wyandot County
- Coordinates: 40°57′06″N 83°10′15″W
- Country: United States
- State: Ohio
- County: Wyandot
- Township: Sycamore

Area
  - Total: 0.64 sq mi (1.65 km^{2})
  - Land: 0.64 sq mi (1.65 km^{2})
  - Water: 0 sq mi (0.00 km^{2})
- Elevation: 837 ft (255 m)

Population (2020)
  - Total: 793
  - Density: 1,245.6/sq mi (480.92/km^{2})
- Time zone: UTC-5 (Eastern (EST))
  - Summer (DST): UTC-4 (EDT)
- ZIP code: 44882
- Area code: 419
- FIPS code: 39-75980
- GNIS feature ID: 2399942

Sycamore is a village in Wyandot County, Ohio, United States. The population was 793 at the 2020 census.

== History ==
Sycamore was laid out in 1842, its name derived from nearby Sycamore Creek.

== Geography ==
According to the United States Census Bureau, the village has a total area of 0.64 square miles (1.66 km^{2}), all land.

== Demographics ==
Historical population
Census	Pop.	Note	%±
1880	272		—
1890	722		165.4%
1900	853		18.1%
1910	977		14.5%
1920	839		−14.1%
1930	808		−3.7%
1940	816		1.0%
1950	935		14.6%
1960	998		6.7%
1970	1,096		9.8%
1980	1,059		−3.4%
1990	919		−13.2%
2000	914		−0.5%
2010	861		−5.8%
2020	793		−7.9%
U.S. Decennial Census

=== 2010 census ===
As of the census of 2010, there were 861 people, 358 households, and 239 families living in the village. The population density was 1,345.3 inhabitants per square mile (519.4/km^{2}). There were 404 housing units at an average density of 631.3 per square mile (243.7/km^{2}). The racial makeup of the village was 99.1% White, 0.1% African American, 0.2% Asian, 0.2% from other races, and 0.3% from two or more races. Hispanic or Latino of any race were 1.5% of the population.

There were 358 households, of which 34.4% had children under the age of 18 living with them, 48.6% were married couples living together, 10.9% had a female householder with no husband present, 7.3% had a male householder with no wife present, and 33.2% were non-families. 28.2% of all households were made up of individuals, and 11.7% had someone living alone who was 65 years of age or older. The average household size was 2.41 and the average family size was 2.89.

The median age in the village was 40.2 years. 25.1% of residents were under the age of 18; 6.9% were between the ages of 18 and 24; 24% were from 25 to 44; 26.9% were from 45 to 64; and 17.1% were 65 years of age or older. The gender makeup of the village was 49.1% male and 50.9% female.

=== 2000 census ===
As of the census of 2000, there were 914 people, 384 households, and 240 families living in the village. The population density was 1,554.5 inhabitants per square mile (600.2/km^{2}). There were 401 housing units at an average density of 682.0 per square mile (263.3/km^{2}). The racial makeup of the village was 99.45% White, 0.22% from other races, and 0.33% from two or more races. Hispanic or Latino of any race were 0.33% of the population.

There were 384 households, out of which 32.1% had children under the age of 18 living with them, 50.6% were married couples living together, 10.5% had a female householder with no husband present, and 36.8% were non-families. 32.4% of all households were made up of individuals, and 18.5% had someone living alone who was 65 years of age or older. The average household size was 2.35 and the average family size was 3.03.

In the village, the population was spread out, with 26.4% under the age of 18, 9.1% from 18 to 24, 27.5% from 25 to 44, 21.2% from 45 to 64, and 15.9% who were 65 years of age or older. The median age was 38 years. For every 100 females there were 84.3 males. For every 1000 females age 18 and over, there were 840.9 males.

The median income for a household in the village was $37,353, and the median income for a family was $47,578. Males had a median income of $30,329 versus $22,344 for females. The per capita income for the village was $18,335. About 4.0% of families and 4.9% of the population were below the poverty line, including 4.2% of those under age 18 and 8.3% of those age 65 or over.

== Education ==
Local high school students attend Mohawk High School included into the Mohawk Local School District.

Sycamore has a lending library, the Mohawk Community Library.
