= Jenera, Ohio =

- Village
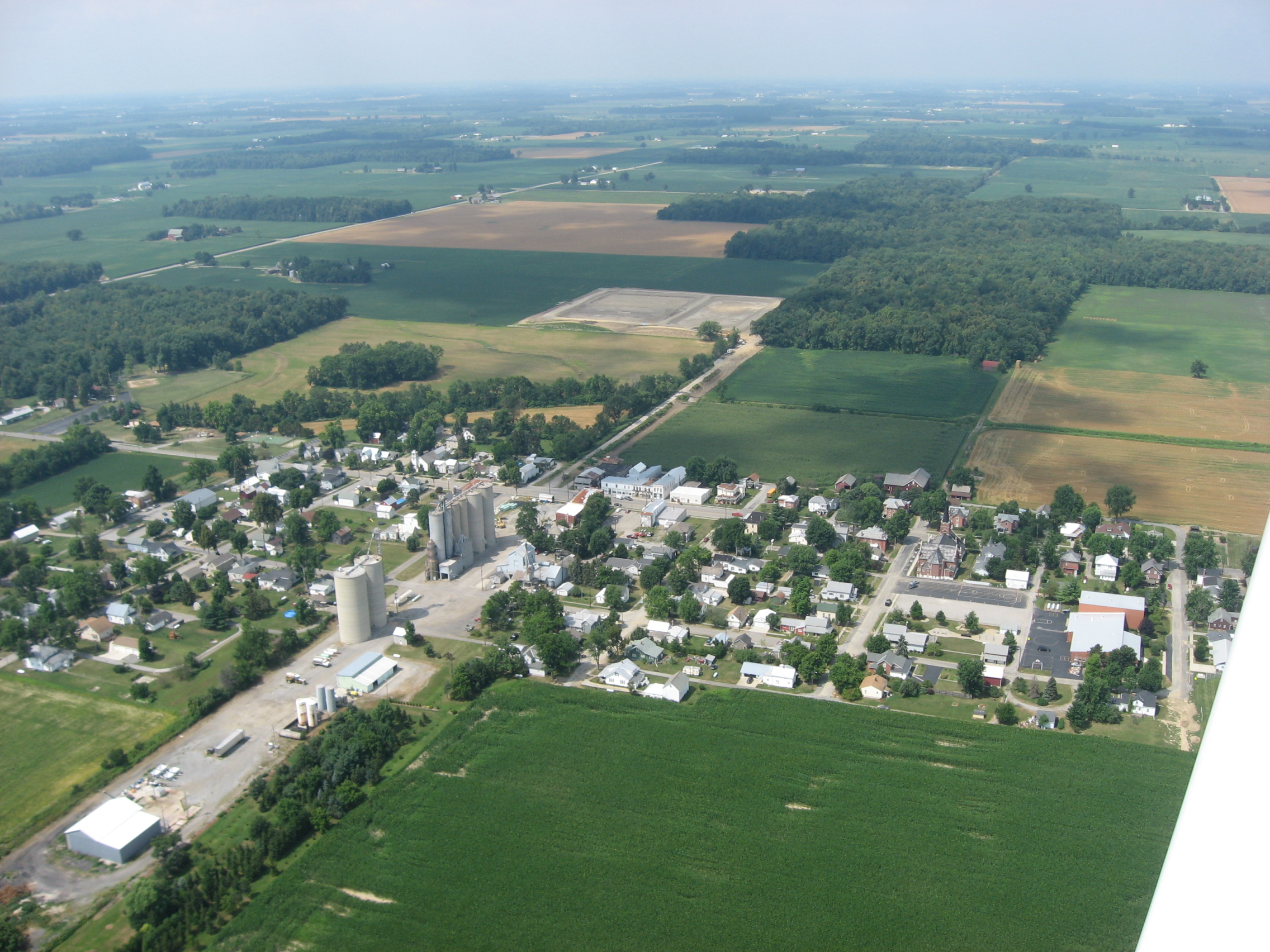
- Aerial view of Jenera

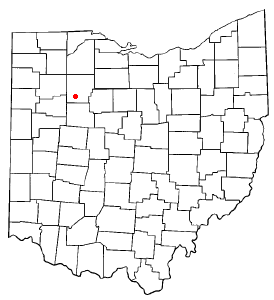
- Location of Jenera, Ohio

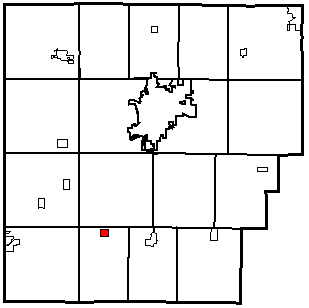
- Location within Hancock County
- Coordinates: 40°53′58″N 83°43′37″W
- Country: United States
- State: Ohio
- County: Hancock

Government
  - Type: Village Council

Area
  - Total: 0.27 sq mi (0.69 km^{2})
  - Land: 0.27 sq mi (0.69 km^{2})
  - Water: 0 sq mi (0.00 km^{2})
- Elevation: 850 ft (260 m)

Population (2020)
  - Total: 257
  - Density: 958.9/sq mi (370.25/km^{2})
- Time zone: UTC-5 (Eastern (EST))
  - Summer (DST): UTC-4 (EDT)
- ZIP code: 45841
- Area code: 419
- FIPS code: 39-38948
- GNIS feature ID: 2398296

Jenera (/dʒəˈnɛər.ə/ jə-NAIR-ə) is a village in Hancock County, Ohio, United States. The population was 257 at the 2020 census. It is surrounded by Van Buren Township and is part of the Cory-Rawson Local School District.

== History ==
Jenera was laid out in 1883 when the railroad was extended to that point. The village was named for Dr. Amos B. Jenner, the first postmaster. Jenera was originally built up chiefly by Germans. A post office has been in operation at Jenera since 1883.

== Geography ==
According to the United States Census Bureau, the village has a total area of 0.27 square miles (0.70 km^{2}), all land.

== Demographics ==
Historical population
| Census | Pop. | Note | %± |
|---|---|---|---|
| 1900 | 237 | | — |
| 1910 | 259 | | 9.3% |
| 1920 | 269 | | 3.9% |
| 1930 | 261 | | −3.0% |
| 1940 | 262 | | 0.4% |
| 1950 | 316 | | 20.6% |
| 1960 | 272 | | −13.9% |
| 1970 | 282 | | 3.7% |
| 1980 | 302 | | 7.1% |
| 1990 | 285 | | −5.6% |
| 2000 | 235 | | −17.5% |
| 2010 | 221 | | −6.0% |
| 2020 | 257 | | 16.3% |
U.S. Decennial Census

=== 2010 census ===
As of the census of 2010, there were 221 people, 79 households, and 56 families living in the village. The population density was 818.5 inhabitants per square mile (316.0/km^{2}). There were 94 housing units at an average density of 348.1 per square mile (134.4/km^{2}). The racial makeup of the village was 99.1% White and 0.9% from two or more races. Hispanic or Latino of any race were 0.9% of the population.

There were 79 households, of which 35.4% had children under the age of 18 living with them, 60.8% were married couples living together, 5.1% had a female householder with no husband present, 5.1% had a male householder with no wife present, and 29.1% were non-families. 24.1% of all households were made up of individuals, and 8.9% had someone living alone who was 65 years of age or older. The average household size was 2.80 and the average family size was 3.34.

The median age in the village was 32.5 years. 28.1% of residents were under the age of 18; 9.4% were between the ages of 18 and 24; 27.1% were from 25 to 44; 25.7% were from 45 to 64; and 9.5% were 65 years of age or older. The gender makeup of the village was 50.7% male and 49.3% female.

=== 2000 census ===
As of the census of 2000, there were 235 people, 95 households, and 64 families living in the village. The population density was 625.4 inhabitants per square mile (241.5/km^{2}). There were 96 housing units at an average density of 255.5 per square mile (98.6/km^{2}). The racial makeup of the village was 97.45% White, 0.85% African American, and 1.70% from two or more races. Hispanic or Latino of any race were 0.43% of the population.

There were 95 households, out of which 32.6% had children under the age of 18 living with them, 53.7% were married couples living together, 11.6% had a female householder with no husband present, and 32.6% were non-families. 30.5% of all households were made up of individuals, and 14.7% had someone living alone who was 65 years of age or older. The average household size was 2.47 and the average family size was 3.11.

In the village, the population was spread out, with 28.5% under the age of 18, 7.2% from 18 to 24, 29.8% from 25 to 44, 18.3% from 45 to 64, and 16.2% who were 65 years of age or older. The median age was 37 years. For every 100 females, there were 88.0 males. For every 100 females age 18 and over, there were 88.8 males.

The median income for a household in the village was $40,417, and the median income for a family was $43,125. Males had a median income of $31,806 versus $26,250 for females. The per capita income for the village was $16,056. About 3.3% of families and 3.1% of the population were below the poverty line, including 6.8% of those under the age of eighteen and none of those 65 or over.

== Gallery ==
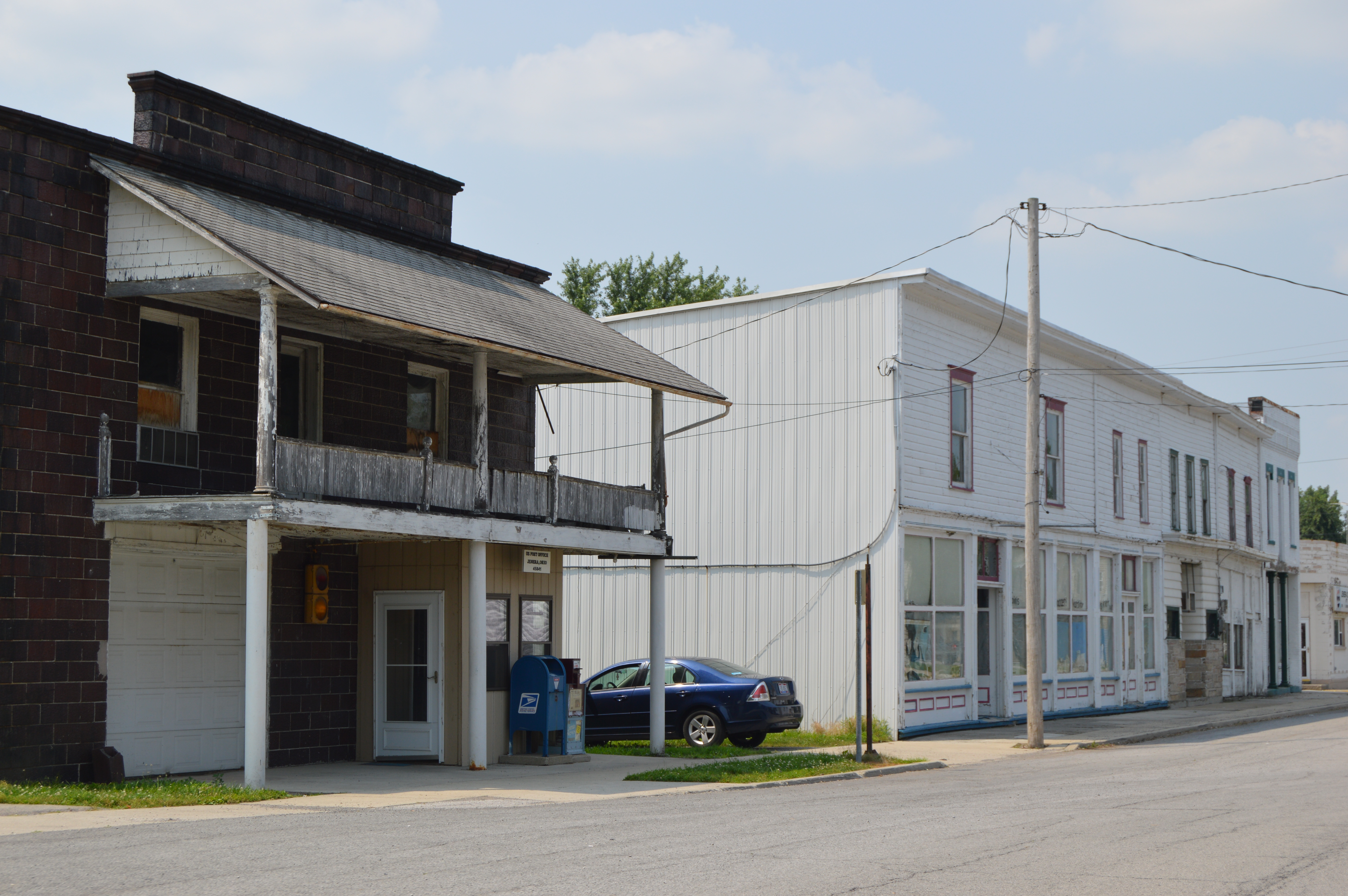
Commercial district and post office

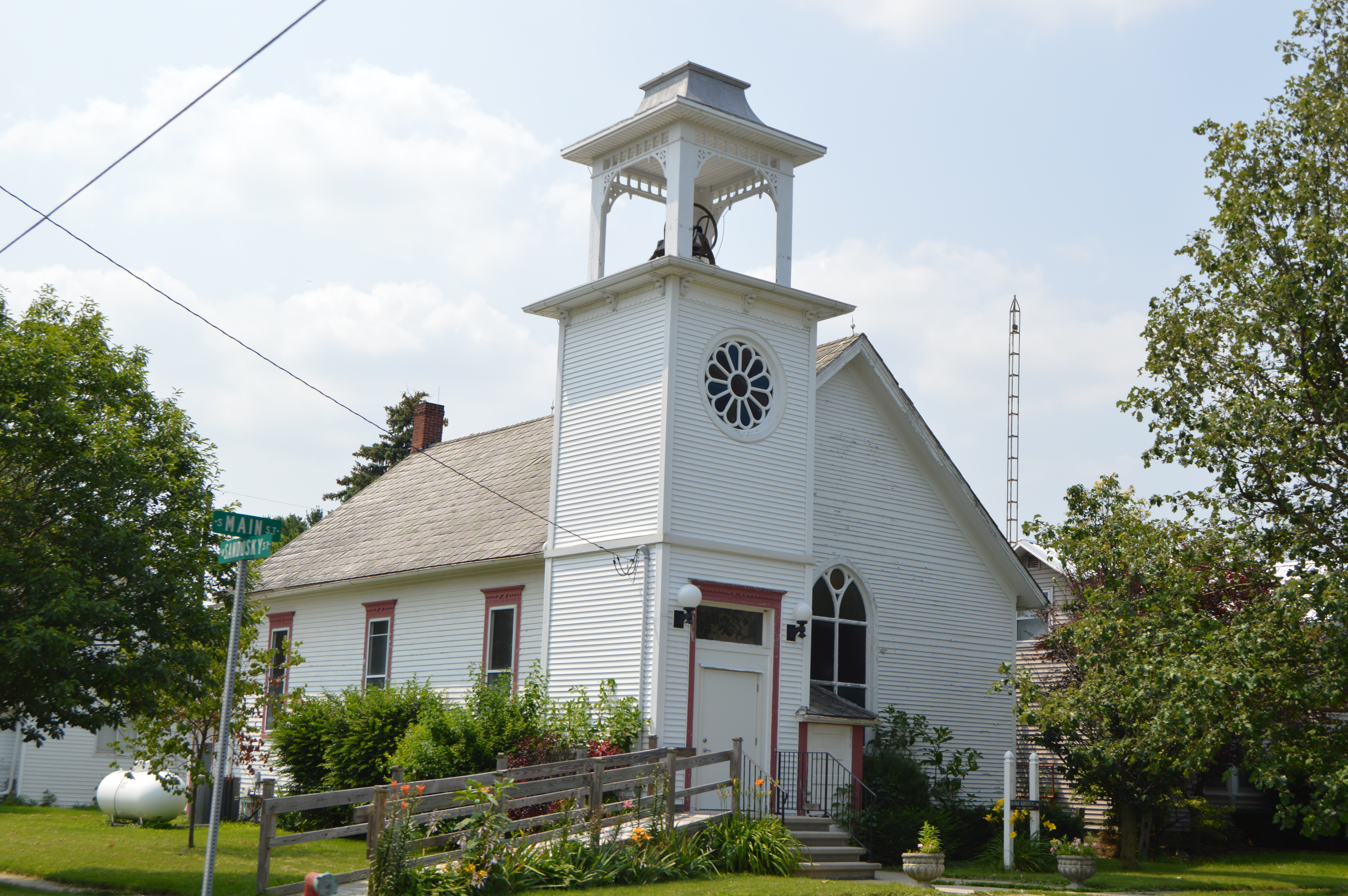
Jenera United Methodist Church

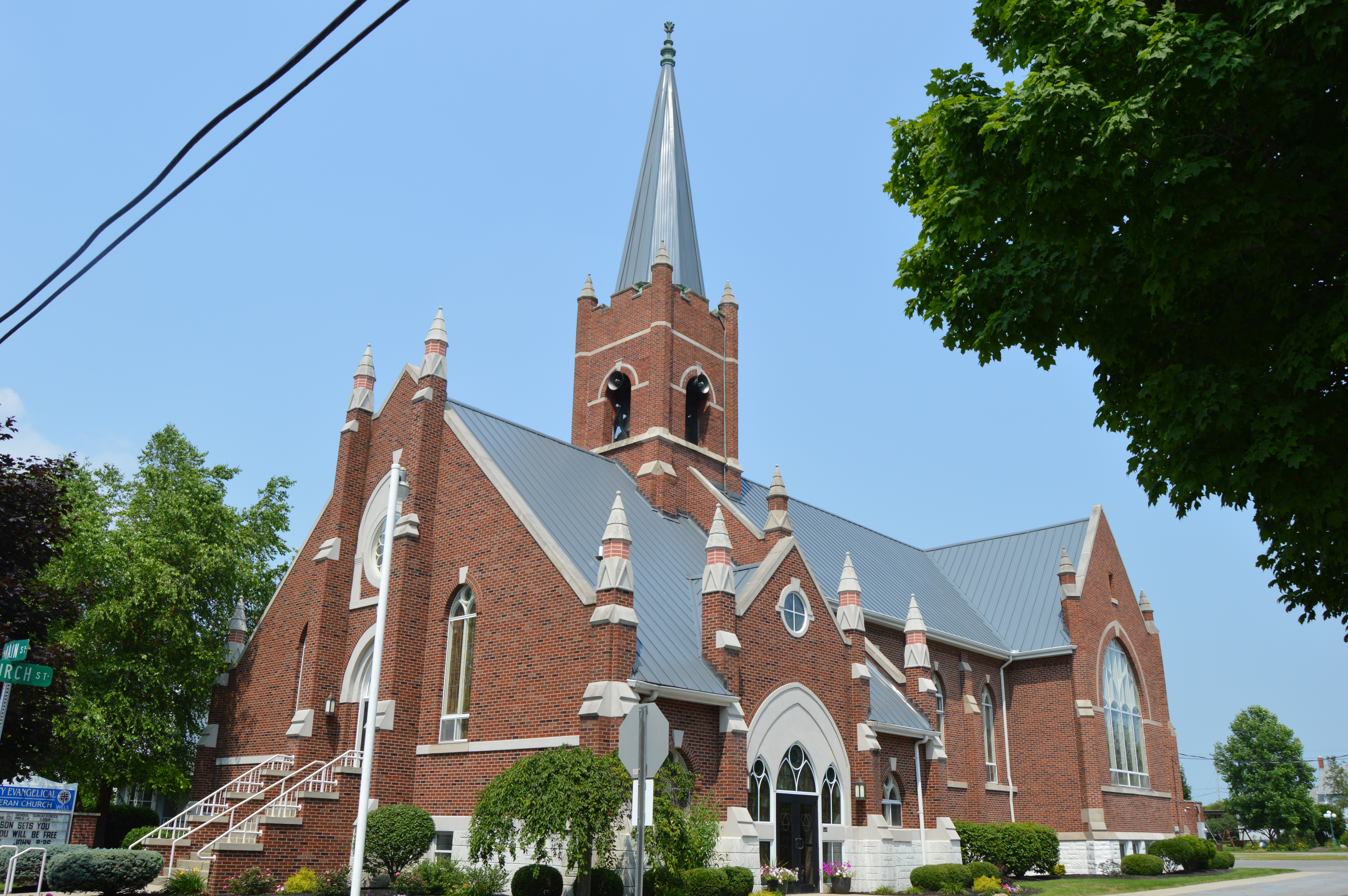
Trinity Evangelical Lutheran Church
