= David Ayres (disambiguation) =

David Ayres (born 1977) is a Canadian ice hockey player.

David Ayres may also refer to:

- David Ayres (soldier) (1841–1916), American Civil War Union Army soldier
- David Cooper Ayres (1820–1890), American physician and legislator

== See also ==
- David Ayer (born 1968), American filmmaker
