= John Snook =

John Snook may refer to:

- John S. Snook (1862–1952), U.S. Representative from Ohio
- John B. Snook (1815–1901), American architect
