= James R. Sherck =

American politician

James Robert Sherck is an American politician of the Democratic party in Ohio. He stood for election to the United States House of Representatives four times—in 1978, 1980, 1982, and 1984, each time losing to Republican incumbent Del Latta. He served as a city prosecutor in Fremont, Ohio. He was elected judge of the Fremont Municipal Court in 1987, serving from 1988 to 1991. In 1990, he was elected to Ohio's Sixth District Court of Appeals. He served as a state appellate judge from 1991 to 2003. In 2002, he was elected judge of the Sandusky County, Ohio Common Pleas Court. He currently resides in Fremont, Ohio.

== See also ==
- Ohio's 5th congressional district
