= William Wildman Campbell =

American politician

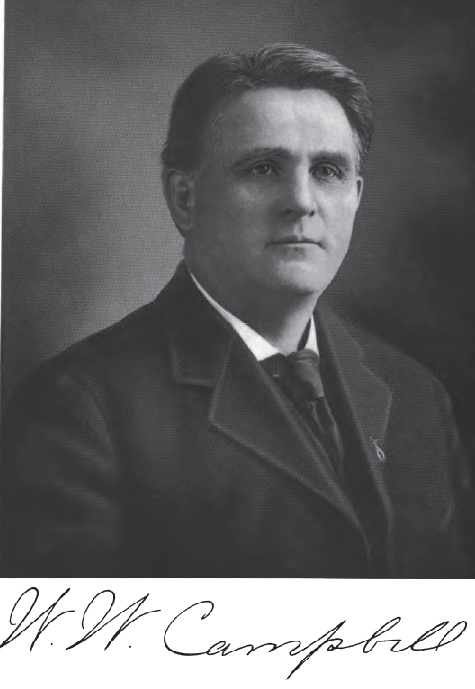

Member of the U.S. House of Representatives from Ohio's 5th district
- In office March 4, 1905 – March 3, 1907
- Preceded by: John S. Snook
- Succeeded by: Timothy T. Ansberry

Personal details
- Born: April 2, 1853 Rochester, Vermont, U.S.
- Died: August 13, 1927 (aged 74) Napoleon, Ohio, U.S.
- Resting place: Forest Hill Cemetery
- Party: Republican
- Education: Goddard Seminary; Tufts College

William Wildman Campbell (April 2, 1853 – August 13, 1927) was a U.S. representative from Ohio.

Born in Rochester, Vermont, Campbell attended the public schools, Goddard Seminary, Barre, Vermont, and Tufts College, Medford, Massachusetts. He studied law. He was admitted to the bar in 1878 and commenced practice at Napoleon, Ohio. He served as prosecuting attorney for Henry County from 1893 to 1896.

Campbell was elected as a Republican to the Fifty-ninth Congress (March 4, 1905 – March 3, 1907). He was an unsuccessful candidate for reelection in 1906 to the Sixtieth Congress and for election in 1908 to the Sixty-first Congress. He resumed the practice of law in Napoleon, Ohio. He served as member of the State constitutional convention of 1911 and 1912. He died in Napoleon, Ohio, August 13, 1927. He was interred in Forest Hill Cemetery.

== Sources ==
- United States Congress. "William Wildman Campbell (id: C000106)". Biographical Directory of the United States Congress.

U.S. House of Representatives
Preceded by John S. Snook	Member of the U.S. House of Representatives from Ohio's 5th congressional district 1905-1907	Succeeded by Timothy T. Ansberry
