= 57th Ohio Infantry Regiment =

- Active: September 16, 1861, to August 14, 1865
- Country: United States
- Allegiance: Union
- Branch: Union Army
- Type: Infantry
- Engagements: Battle of Shiloh; Siege of Corinth; Battle of Chickasaw Bayou; Battle of Arkansas Post; Battle of Champion Hill; Siege of Vicksburg; Battle of Missionary Ridge; Atlanta campaign; Battle of Resaca; Battle of Dallas; Battle of New Hope Church; Battle of Allatoona; Battle of Kennesaw Mountain; Battle of Atlanta; Siege of Atlanta; Battle of Jonesboro; Sherman's March to the Sea; Carolinas campaign; Battle of Bentonville

The 57th Ohio Infantry Regiment was an infantry regiment in the Union Army during the American Civil War.

== Service ==
The 57th Ohio Infantry Regiment was organized at Camp Vance in Findlay, Ohio and mustered in for three years service on December 12, 1861, under the command of Colonel William Mungen.

The regiment was attached to District of Paducah, Kentucky, to March 1862. 3rd Brigade, 5th Division, Army of the Tennessee, to May 1862. 1st Brigade, 5th Division, Army of the Tennessee, to July 1862. 1st Brigade, 5th Division, District of Memphis, Tennessee, to November 1862. 4th Brigade, 5th Division, Right Wing, XIII Corps, Department of the Tennessee, to November 1862. 2nd Brigade, 2nd Division, District of Memphis, XIII Corps, to December 1862. 2nd Brigade, 2nd Division, Sherman's Yazoo Expedition, to January 1863. 2nd Brigade, 2nd Division, XV Corps, Army of the Tennessee, to September 1863. 1st Brigade, 2nd Division, XV Corps, to July 1865. Department of Arkansas to August 1865.

The 57th Ohio Infantry mustered out of service on August 14, 1865, at Little Rock, Arkansas.

== Detailed service ==
=== 1862 ===
- Moved to Camp Chase, Ohio, January 22, 1862.
- Ordered to Paducah, Ky., February 18.
- Duty at Paducah, Ky., until March 6, 1862.
- Moved to Savannah, Tenn., March 6–10.
- Expedition to Yellow Creek and occupation of Pittsburg Landing, Tenn., March 14–17.
- Expedition to Eastport, Miss., and Chickasaw, Ala., April 1–2.
- Battle of Shiloh, Tenn., April 6–7.
- Corinth Road April 8.
- Advance on and siege of Corinth, Miss., April 29-May 30.
- Russell House, near Corinth, May 17.
- March to Memphis, Tenn., via LaGrange, Grand Junction, and Holly Springs June 1-July 18.
- Rising Sun, Tenn., June 30.
- Duty at Memphis until November.
- Expedition from Memphis to Coldwater and Herando, Miss., September 8–13.
- Skirmish at Wolf Creek Bridge September 23.
- Grant's Central Mississippi Campaign. "Tallahatchie March" November 26-December 13.
- Sherman's Yazoo Expedition December 20, 1862, to January 3, 1863.
- Chickasaw Bayou December 26–28, 1862.
- Chickasaw Bluff December 29.

=== 1863 ===
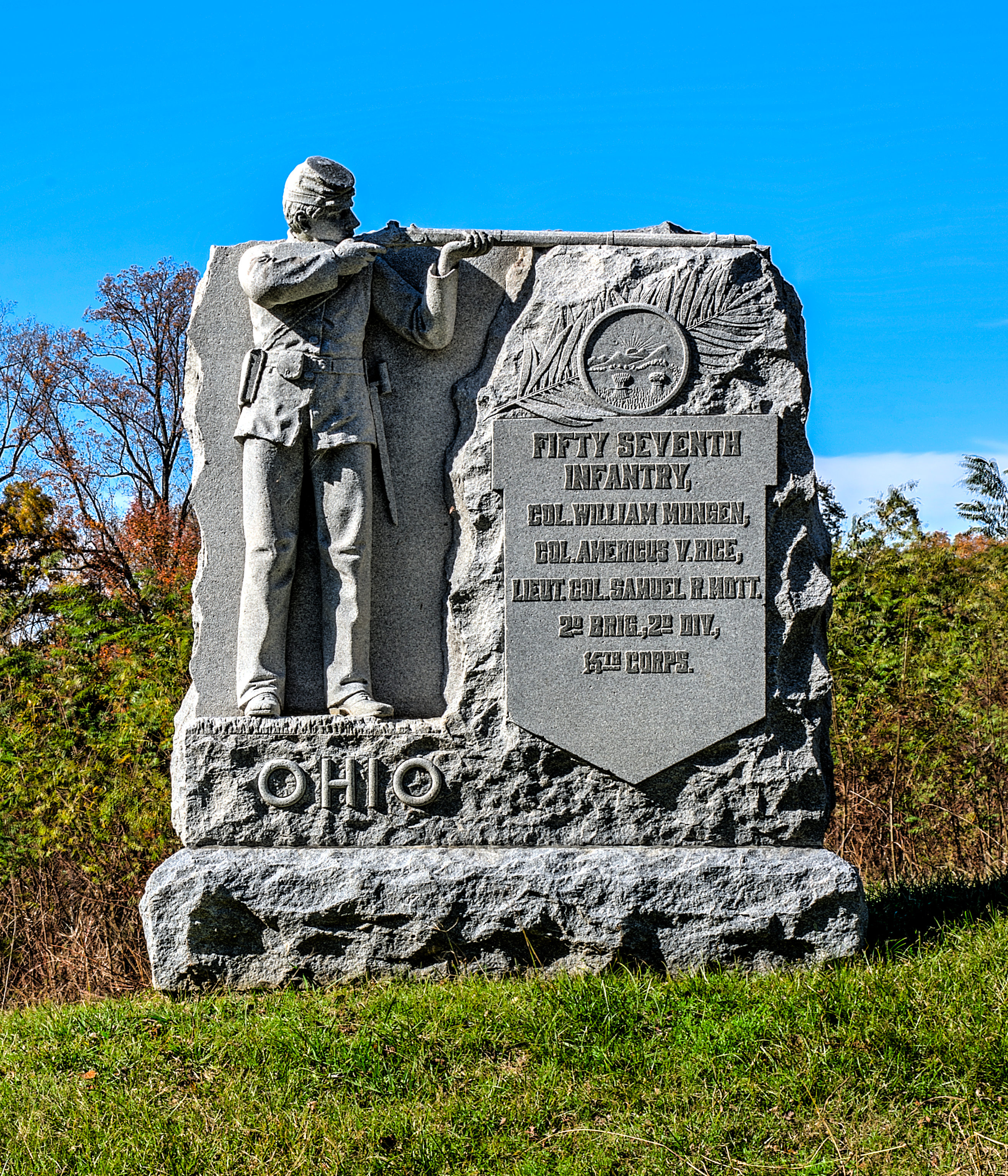
Memorial at Vicksburg National Military Park

- Expedition to Arkansas Post, Ark., January 3–10, 1863.
- Assault and capture of Fort Hindman, Arkansas Post, January 10–11.
- Expedition to South Bend, Arkansas River, January 14–15.
- Moved to Young's Point, La., January 17–21, and duty there until March.
- Expedition to Rolling Fork, Miss., via Muddy, Steele's and Black Bayous and Deer Creek March 14–27.
- Demonstration on Haines and Drumgould's Bluffs April 29-May 2.
- Movement to join army in rear of Vicksburg, Miss., via Richmond and Grand Gulf May 2–14.
- Battle of Champion Hill May 16.
- Siege of Vicksburg May 18-July 4.
- Assaults on Vicksburg May 19 and 22.
- Advance on Jackson, Miss., July 4–10.
- Siege of Jackson July 10–17.
- Duty at Big Black until September 27.
- Moved to Memphis, thence march to Chattanooga, Tenn., September 27-November 20.
- Operations on Memphis & Chattanooga Railroad in Alabama October 20–29.
- Bear Creek, Tuscumbia, October 27.
- Chattanooga-Ringgold Campaign November 23–27.
- Tunnel Hill November 23–25.
- Foot of Missionary Ridge November 24.
- Missionary Ridge November 25.
- Pursuit to Graysville November 26–27.
- March to relief of Knoxville, Tenn., November 28-December 8.

=== 1864 ===
- Reenlisted January 1, 1864. Veterans on furlough February–March.
- Atlanta Campaign May 1-September 8.
- Demonstrations on Resaca May 8–13.
- Near Resaca May 13.
- Battle of Resaca May 14–15.
- Advance on Dallas May 18–25.
- Operations on line of Pumpkin Vine Creek and battles about Dallas, New Hope Church, and Allatoona Hills May 25-June 5.
- Operations about Marietta and against Kennesaw Mountain June 10-July 5.
- Assault on Kennesaw June 27.
- Nickajack Creek July 2–5. Chattahoochie River July 6–17.
- Battle of Atlanta July 22.
- Siege of Atlanta July 22-August 25.
- Ezra Chapel, Hood's 2nd Sortie, July 28.
- Flank movement on Jonesboro August 25–30.
- Battle of Jonesboro August 31-September 1.
- Lovejoy's Station September 2–6.
- Operations against Hood in northern Georgia and northern Alabama September 29-November 3.
- March to the sea November 15-December 10.
- Clinton November 21–23.
- Ball's Ferry and Georgia Central Railroad Bridge November 23–25.
- Siege of Savannah December 10–21.
- Fort McAllister December 13.

=== 1865 ===
- Campaign of the Carolinas January to April 1865.
- Salkehatchie Swamps, S.C., February 2–5.
- Holman's Bridge, South Edisto River, February 9.
- North Edisto River February 12–13.
- Columbia February 16–17. Battle of Bentonville, N.C., March 20–21.
- Occupation of Goldsboro March 24.
- Advance on Raleigh April 10–14.
- Occupation of Raleigh April 14.
- Bennett's House April 26.
- Surrender of Johnston and his army.
- March to Washington, D.C., via Richmond, Va., April 29-May 30.
- Grand Review of the Armies May 24.
- Moved to Louisville, Ky., June 2; then to Little Rock, Ark., and duty there until August.

== Casualties ==
The regiment lost a total of 319 men during service; 4 officers and 77 enlisted men killed or mortally wounded, 4 officers and 234 enlisted men died of disease.

== Commanders ==
- Colonel William Mungen
- Colonel Americus V. Rice - commanded at the battle of Shiloh as lieutenant colonel
- Lieutenant Colonel Samuel Rolla Mott - commanded at the battle of Missionary Ridge

== Notable members ==
- Sergeant David Ayres, Company A - Medal of Honor recipient for action at the siege of Vicksburg, May 22, 1863; later promoted to captain
- Private David Frakes Day, Company D - Medal of Honor recipient for action at the siege of Vicksburg, May 22, 1863

== See also ==
- List of Ohio Civil War units
- Ohio in the Civil War
- Battle of Shiloh
- Battle of Champion Hill
- Siege of Vicksburg
- Battle of Missionary Ridge
- Atlanta campaign
- Sherman's March to the Sea
- Carolinas campaign
- Battle of Bentonville
