= Ohio's 5th congressional district =

U.S. House district for Ohio

Coordinates: 41°09′21″N 84°02′41″W

- Interactive map of district boundaries
- Representative: Bob Latta; R–Bowling Green
- Distribution: 62.27% urban; 37.73% rural
- Population (2025): 795,319
- Median household income: $73,380
- Ethnicity: 83.9% White; 7.3% Hispanic; 3.7% Two or more races; 3.7% Black; 0.9% Asian; 0.5% other
- Cook PVI: R+14

Ohio's 5th congressional district is in the northwestern and north central regions of the US state, and borders Indiana. The district is currently represented by Republican Bob Latta.

== Recent election results from statewide races ==
=== 2023-2027 boundaries ===
Year	Office	Results
2008	President	McCain 50% - 48%
2012	President	Romney 54% - 46%
2016	President	Trump 60% - 35%
2016	Senate	Portman 64% - 30%
2018	Senate	Renacci 52% - 48%
2018	Governor	DeWine 58% - 39%
2018	Secretary of State	LaRose 58% - 39%
2018	Treasurer	Sprague 62% - 38%
2018	Auditor	Faber 58% - 38%
2018	Attorney General	Yost 60% - 40%
2020	President	Trump 63% - 36%
2022	Senate	Vance 61% - 39%
2022	Governor	DeWine 71% - 29%
2022	Secretary of State	LaRose 68% - 31%
2022	Treasurer	Sprague 68% - 32%
2022	Auditor	Faber 68% - 32%
2022	Attorney General	Yost 69% - 31%
2024	President	Trump 64% - 35%
2024	Senate	Moreno 58% - 38%

=== 2027–2033 boundaries ===
Year	Office	Results
2008	President	Obama 50% - 47%
2012	President	Obama 50.03% - 49.97%
2016	President	Trump 57% - 38%
2016	Senate	Portman 62% - 32%
2018	Senate	Brown 51% - 49%
2018	Governor	DeWine 55% - 41%
2018	Attorney General	Yost 56% - 44%
2020	President	Trump 60% - 39%
2022	Senate	Vance 58% - 42%
2022	Governor	DeWine 69% - 31%
2022	Secretary of State	LaRose 65% - 34%
2022	Treasurer	Sprague 65% - 35%
2022	Auditor	Faber 65% - 35%
2022	Attorney General	Yost 66% - 34%
2024	President	Trump 61% - 38%
2024	Senate	Moreno 55% - 41%

== Composition ==
For the 118th and successive Congresses (based on redistricting following the 2020 census), the district contains all or portions of the following counties, townships, and municipalities:

Crawford County (23)

All 23 townships and municipalities

Hancock County (30)

All 30 townships and municipalities

Henry County (22)

All 22 townships and municipalities

Huron County (29)

All 29 townships and municipalities

Lorain County (34)

All 34 townships and municipalities

Mercer County (23)

All 23 townships and municipalities

Paulding County (23)

All 23 townships and municipalities

Putnam County (30)

All 30 townships and municipalities

Seneca County (24)

All 24 townships and municipalities

Van Wert County (22)

All 22 townships and municipalities

Wood County (37)

Bairdstown, Bloomdale, Bloom Township, Bowling Green, Bradner, Center Township, Custar, Cygnet, Freedom Township, Grand Rapids, Grand Rapids Township, Haskins, Henry Township, Hoytville, Jackson Township, Jerry City, Liberty Township, Luckey, Middleton Township (part; also 9th), Milton Center, Milton Township, Montgomery Township, North Baltimore, Pemberville, Perry Township, Plain Township, Portage, Portage Township, Risingsun, Tontogany, Troy Township, Washington Township, Wayne, Webster Township, West Millgrove, Weston, Weston Township

Wyandot County (17)

Antrim Township, Carey, Crane Township, Crawford Township, Eden Township, Harpster, Mifflin Township, Nevada, Pitt Township, Richland Township, Ridge Township, Salem Township, Sycamore, Sycamore Township, Tymochtee Township, Upper Sandusky, Wharton

== List of members representing the district ==
Member	Party	Years	Cong ress	Electoral history	Counties represented
District established March 4, 1813
James Kilbourne (Worthington)	Democratic-Republican	March 4, 1813 – March 3, 1817	13th 14th	Elected in 1812. Re-elected in 1814. Retired.	
Philemon Beecher (Lancaster)	Democratic-Republican	March 4, 1817 – March 3, 1821	15th 16th	Elected in 1816. Re-elected in 1818. Lost re-election.	
Joseph Vance (Urbana)	Democratic-Republican	March 4, 1821 – March 3, 1823	17th	Elected in 1820. Redistricted to the 4th district.	
John Wilson Campbell (West Union)	Democratic-Republican	March 4, 1823 – March 3, 1825	18th 19th	Redistricted from the 2nd district and re-elected in 1822. Re-elected in 1824. Retired.	
John Wilson Campbell (West Union)	Anti-Jacksonian	March 4, 1825 – March 3, 1827	18th 19th	Redistricted from the 2nd district and re-elected in 1822. Re-elected in 1824. Retired.	
William Russell (West Union)	Jacksonian	March 4, 1827 – March 3, 1833	20th 21st 22nd	Elected in 1826. Re-elected in 1828. Re-elected in 1830. Lost re-election.	
Thomas L. Hamer (Georgetown)	Jacksonian	March 4, 1833 – March 3, 1837	23rd 24th 25th	Elected in 1832. Re-elected in 1834. Re-elected in 1836. [data missing]	
Thomas L. Hamer (Georgetown)	Democratic	March 4, 1837 – March 3, 1839	23rd 24th 25th	Elected in 1832. Re-elected in 1834. Re-elected in 1836. [data missing]	
William Doan (Withamsville)	Democratic	March 4, 1839 – March 3, 1843	26th 27th	Elected in 1838. Re-elected in 1840. Retired.	
Emery D. Potter (Toledo)	Democratic	March 4, 1843 – March 3, 1845	28th	Elected in 1843. Retired.	
William Sawyer (St. Marys)	Democratic	March 4, 1845 – March 3, 1849	29th 30th	Elected in 1844. Re-elected in 1846. Lost re-election.	
Emery D. Potter (Toledo)	Democratic	March 4, 1849 – March 3, 1851	31st	Elected in 1848. [data missing]	
Alfred Edgerton (Hicksville)	Democratic	March 4, 1851 – March 3, 1855	32nd 33rd	Elected in 1850. Re-elected in 1852. [data missing]	
Richard Mott (Toledo)	Anti-Nebraska	March 4, 1855 – March 3, 1857	34th 35th	Elected in 1854. Re-elected in 1856. [data missing]	
Richard Mott (Toledo)	Republican	March 4, 1857 – March 3, 1859	34th 35th	Elected in 1854. Re-elected in 1856. [data missing]	
James Mitchell Ashley (Toledo)	Republican	March 4, 1859 – March 3, 1863	36th 37th	Elected in 1858. Re-elected in 1860. Redistricted to the 10th district.	
Francis Celeste Le Blond (Celina)	Democratic	March 4, 1863 – March 3, 1867	38th 39th	Elected in 1862. Re-elected in 1864. [data missing]	
William Mungen (Findlay)	Democratic	March 4, 1867 – March 3, 1871	40th 41st	Elected in 1866. Re-elected in 1868. [data missing]	
Charles Nelson Lamison (Lima)	Democratic	March 4, 1871 – March 3, 1875	42nd 43rd	Elected in 1870. Re-elected in 1872. [data missing]	
Americus Vespucius Rice (Ottawa)	Democratic	March 4, 1875 – March 3, 1879	44th 45th	Elected in 1874. Re-elected in 1876. [data missing]	
Benjamin Le Fevre (Sidney)	Democratic	March 4, 1879 – March 3, 1883	46th 47th	Elected in 1878. Re-elected in 1880. Redistricted to the 4th district.	
George E. Seney (Tiffin)	Democratic	March 4, 1883 – March 3, 1885	48th	Elected in 1882. Redistricted to the 7th district.	
Benjamin Le Fevre (Maplewood)	Democratic	March 4, 1885 – March 3, 1887	49th	Redistricted from the 4th district and re-elected in 1884. [data missing]	
George E. Seney (Tiffin)	Democratic	March 4, 1887 – March 3, 1891	50th 51st	Redistricted from the 7th district and re-elected in 1886. Re-elected in 1888. [data missing]	
Fernando C. Layton (Wapakoneta)	Democratic	March 4, 1891 – March 3, 1893	52nd	Elected in 1890. Redistricted to the 4th district.	
Dennis D. Donovan (Deshler)	Democratic	March 4, 1893 – March 3, 1895	53rd	Redistricted from the 6th district and re-elected in 1892. [data missing]	
Francis B. De Witt (Paulding)	Republican	March 4, 1895 – March 3, 1897	54th	Elected in 1894. [data missing]	
David Meekison (Napoleon)	Democratic	March 4, 1897 – March 3, 1901	55th 56th	Elected in 1896. Re-elected in 1898. Retired.	
John S. Snook (Paulding)	Democratic	March 4, 1901 – March 3, 1905	57th 58th	Elected in 1900. Re-elected in 1902. Retired.	
William W. Campbell (Napoleon)	Republican	March 4, 1905 – March 3, 1907	59th	Elected in 1904. Lost re-election.	
Timothy T. Ansberry (Defiance)	Democratic	March 4, 1907 – January 9, 1915	60th 61st 62nd 63rd	Elected in 1906. Re-elected in 1908. Re-elected in 1910. Re-elected in 1912. Resigned when appointed to the Ohio Court of Appeals.	
Vacant		January 9, 1915 – March 3, 1915	63rd		
Nelson E. Matthews (Ottawa)	Republican	March 4, 1915 – March 3, 1917	64th	Elected in 1914. [data missing]	
John S. Snook (Paulding)	Democratic	March 4, 1917 – March 3, 1919	65th	Elected in 1916. Retired.	
Charles J. Thompson (Defiance)	Republican	March 4, 1919 – March 3, 1931	66th 67th 68th 69th 70th 71st	Elected in 1918. Re-elected in 1920. Re-elected in 1922. Re-elected in 1924. Re-elected in 1926. Re-elected in 1928. Lost re-election.	
Frank C. Kniffin (Napoleon)	Democratic	March 4, 1931 – January 3, 1939	72nd 73rd 74th 75th	Elected in 1930. Re-elected in 1932. Re-elected in 1934. Re-elected in 1936. Lost re-election.	
Cliff Clevenger (Bryan)	Republican	January 3, 1939 – January 3, 1959	76th 77th 78th 79th 80th 81st 82nd 83rd 84th 85th	Elected in 1938. Re-elected in 1940. Re-elected in 1942. Re-elected in 1944. Re-elected in 1946. Re-elected in 1948. Re-elected in 1950. Re-elected in 1952. Re-elected in 1954. Re-elected in 1956. Retired.	
Del Latta (Bowling Green)	Republican	January 3, 1959 – January 3, 1989	86th 87th 88th 89th 90th 91st 92nd 93rd 94th 95th 96th 97th 98th 99th 100th	Elected in 1958. Re-elected in 1960. Re-elected in 1962. Re-elected in 1964. Re-elected in 1966. Re-elected in 1968. Re-elected in 1970. Re-elected in 1972. Re-elected in 1974. Re-elected in 1976. Re-elected in 1978. Re-elected in 1980. Re-elected in 1982. Re-elected in 1984. Re-elected in 1986. Retired.	
Paul Gillmor (Tiffin)	Republican	January 3, 1989 – September 5, 2007	101st 102nd 103rd 104th 105th 106th 107th 108th 109th 110th	Elected in 1988. Re-elected in 1990. Re-elected in 1992. Re-elected in 1994. Re-elected in 1996. Re-elected in 1998. Re-elected in 2000. Re-elected in 2002. Re-elected in 2004. Re-elected in 2006. Died.	
Paul Gillmor (Tiffin)	Republican	January 3, 1989 – September 5, 2007	101st 102nd 103rd 104th 105th 106th 107th 108th 109th 110th	Elected in 1988. Re-elected in 1990. Re-elected in 1992. Re-elected in 1994. Re-elected in 1996. Re-elected in 1998. Re-elected in 2000. Re-elected in 2002. Re-elected in 2004. Re-elected in 2006. Died.	2003–2013
Vacant		September 5, 2007 – December 11, 2007	110th		2003–2013
Bob Latta (Bowling Green)	Republican	December 11, 2007 – present	110th 111th 112th 113th 114th 115th 116th 117th 118th 119th	Elected to finish Gillmor's term. Re-elected in 2008. Re-elected in 2010. Re-elected in 2012. Re-elected in 2014. Re-elected in 2016. Re-elected in 2018. Re-elected in 2020. Re-elected in 2022. Re-elected in 2024. Re-elected in 2026.	2003–2013
Bob Latta (Bowling Green)	Republican	December 11, 2007 – present	110th 111th 112th 113th 114th 115th 116th 117th 118th 119th	Elected to finish Gillmor's term. Re-elected in 2008. Re-elected in 2010. Re-elected in 2012. Re-elected in 2014. Re-elected in 2016. Re-elected in 2018. Re-elected in 2020. Re-elected in 2022. Re-elected in 2024. Re-elected in 2026.	2013–2023
Bob Latta (Bowling Green)	Republican	December 11, 2007 – present	110th 111th 112th 113th 114th 115th 116th 117th 118th 119th	Elected to finish Gillmor's term. Re-elected in 2008. Re-elected in 2010. Re-elected in 2012. Re-elected in 2014. Re-elected in 2016. Re-elected in 2018. Re-elected in 2020. Re-elected in 2022. Re-elected in 2024. Re-elected in 2026.	2023–2027

== Election results ==
The following chart shows historic election results. Bold type indicates victor. Italic type indicates incumbent.

Year	Democratic	Republican	Other
1812	District created following the 1810 census.		
...			
1920	Newt Bronson: 25,395	**Charles J. Thompson**: 40,381	
1922	Frank C. Kniffin: 28,067	**Charles J. Thompson**: 31,700	
1924	Frank C. Kniffin: 29,245	**Charles J. Thompson**: 31,045	
1926	Frank C. Kniffin: 23,022	**Charles J. Thompson**: 23,638	
1928	Frank C. Kniffin: 31,385	**Charles J. Thompson**: 36,096	
1930	Frank C. Kniffin: 29,117	Charles J. Thompson: 27,497	
1932	**Frank C. Kniffin**: 44,433	William L. Manahan: 29,605	
1934	**Frank C. Kniffin**: 34,249	Davis B. Johnson: 27,423	
1936	**Frank C. Kniffin**: 41,693	Stephan S. Beard: 33,212	Fred L. Hay: 3,663
1938	Frank C. Kniffin: 28,109	Cliff Clevenger: 37,027	
1940	C. H. Armbruster: 31,063	**Cliff Clevenger**: 48,040	
1942	Ferdinand E. Warren: 17,514	**Cliff Clevenger**: 30,667	
1944	T. Walter Williams: 22,740	**Cliff Clevenger**: 48,490	
1946	Willard Thomas: 20,163	**Cliff Clevenger**: 30,623	
1948	Dan Batt: 32,076	**Cliff Clevenger**: 34,950	
1950	Dan Batt: 26,689	**Cliff Clevenger**: 36,096	
1952	Dan Batt: 42,104	**Cliff Clevenger**: 72,168	
1954	Martin W. Feigert: 33,483	**Cliff Clevenger**: 49,265	
1956	George E. Rafferty: 42,181	**Cliff Clevenger**: 69,774	
1958	George E. Rafferty: 44,971	Delbert L. Latta: 52,612	
1960	Tom T. McRitchie: 41,375	**Delbert L. Latta**: 85,175	
1962	William T. Hunt: 29,114	**Delbert L. Latta**: 69,272	
1964	Milford Landis: 41,621	**Delbert L. Latta**: 80,394	
1966	John H. Shock: 26,503	**Delbert L. Latta**: 80,906	
1968	Louis Richard Batzler: 45,884	**Delbert L. Latta**: 113,381	
1970	Carl G. Sherer: 37,545	**Delbert L. Latta**: 92,577	
1972	Bruce Edwards: 49,465	**Delbert L. Latta**: 132,032	
1974	Bruce Edwards: 53,391	**Delbert L. Latta**: 89,161	
1976	Bruce Edwards: 60,304	**Delbert L. Latta**: 124,910	
1978	James R. Sherck: 51,071	**Delbert L. Latta**: 85,547	
1980	James R. Sherck: 57,704	**Delbert L. Latta**: 137,003	
1982	James R. Sherck: 70,120	**Delbert L. Latta**: 86,450	
1984	James R. Sherck: 78,809	**Delbert L. Latta**: 132,582	
1986	Tom Murray: 54,864	**Delbert L. Latta**: 102,016	
1988	Tom Murray: 80,472	Paul E. Gillmor: 128,838	
1990	P. Scott Mange: 41,693	**Paul E. Gillmor**: 113,615	John E. Jackson: 10,612
1992		**Paul E. Gillmor**: 187,860	
1994	Jarrod Tudor: 49,335	**Paul E. Gillmor**: 135,879	
1996	Annie Saunders: 81,170	**Paul E. Gillmor**: 145,892	David J. Schaffer (N): 11,461
1998	Susan Davenport Darrow: 61,926	**Paul E. Gillmor**: 123,979	
2000	Dannie Edmon: 62,138	**Paul E. Gillmor**: 169,857	John F. Green (L): 5,464; David J. Schaffer (N): 5,881
2002	Roger Anderson: 51,872	**Paul E. Gillmor**: 126,286	John F. Green: 10,096
2004	Robin Weirauch: 95,481	**Paul E. Gillmor**: 194,559	
2006	Robin Weirauch: 95,955	**Paul E. Gillmor** : 126,898	
2007*	Robin Weirauch: 32,246	Robert E. Latta: 41,740	
2008	George Mays: 105,840	**Robert E. Latta**: 188,905	
2012	Angela Zimmann: 137,806	**Robert E. Latta**: 201,514	Eric Eberly (L) : 12,558
2014	Robert Fry: 57,328	**Robert E. Latta**: 132,448	Eric Eberly (L) : 9,142
2016	James L. Neu Jr.: 100,392	**Robert E. Latta**: 244,599	
2018	J. Michael Galbraith: 99,655	**Robert E. Latta**: 176,569	Don Kissick (L): 7,393
2020	Nick Rubando: 120,962	**Robert E. Latta**: 257,019	
2022	Craig Swartz: 92,634	**Robert E. Latta**: 187,303	
2024	Keith Mundy: 123,024	**Robert E. Latta**: 255,633	

=== 2010 ===
Ohio's 5th Congressional District Election (2010)
Party	Candidate	Votes	%
**Republican**	**Bob Latta***	**140,703**	**67.82**
Democratic	Caleb Finkenbiner	54,919	26.47
Libertarian	Brian Smith	11,831	5.70
Total votes		**207,453**	**100.00**
Turnout			
Republican **hold**			

=== 2012 ===
Ohio's 5th congressional district (2012)
Party	Candidate	Votes	%
**Republican**	**Bob Latta (incumbent)**	**201,514**	**57.3**
Democratic	Angela Zimmann	137,806	39.2
Libertarian	Eric Eberly	12,558	3.5
Total votes		**351,878**	**100.0**
Republican **hold**			

=== 2014 ===
Ohio's 5th congressional district (2014)
Party	Candidate	Votes	%
**Republican**	**Bob Latta (incumbent)**	**134,449**	**66.5**
Democratic	Robert Fry	58,507	28.9
Libertarian	Eric Eberly	9,344	4.6
Total votes		**202,300**	**100.0**
Republican **hold**			

=== 2016 ===
Ohio's 5th congressional district (2016)
Party	Candidate	Votes	%
**Republican**	**Bob Latta (incumbent)**	**244,599**	**70.9**
Democratic	James L. Neu Jr.	100,392	29.1
Total votes		**344,991**	**100.0**
Republican **hold**			

=== 2018 ===
Ohio's 5th congressional district (2018)
Party	Candidate	Votes	%
**Republican**	**Bob Latta (incumbent)**	**176,569**	**62.3**
Democratic	J. Michael Galbraith	99,655	35.1
Libertarian	Don Kissick	7,393	2.6
Total votes		**283,617**	**100.0**
Republican **hold**			

=== 2020 ===
Ohio's 5th congressional district (2020)
Party	Candidate	Votes	%
**Republican**	**Bob Latta (incumbent)**	**257,019**	**68.0**
Democratic	Nick Rubando	120,962	32.0
Total votes		**377,981**	**100.0**
Republican **hold**			

=== 2022 ===
Ohio's 5th congressional district (2022)
Party	Candidate	Votes	%
**Republican**	**Bob Latta (incumbent)**	**187,303**	**66.9**
Democratic	Craig Swartz	92,634	33.1
Total votes		**279,937**	**100.0**
Republican **hold**			

=== 2024 ===
Ohio's 5th congressional district (2024)
Party	Candidate	Votes	%
**Republican**	**Bob Latta (incumbent)**	**255,633**	**67.5**
Democratic	Keith Mundy	123,024	32.5
Total votes		**378,657**	**100.0**
Republican **hold**			

== See also ==
- Ohio's congressional districts
- List of United States congressional districts
- Ohio's 5th congressional district special election, 2007
