= David Meekison =

American politician (1849–1915)

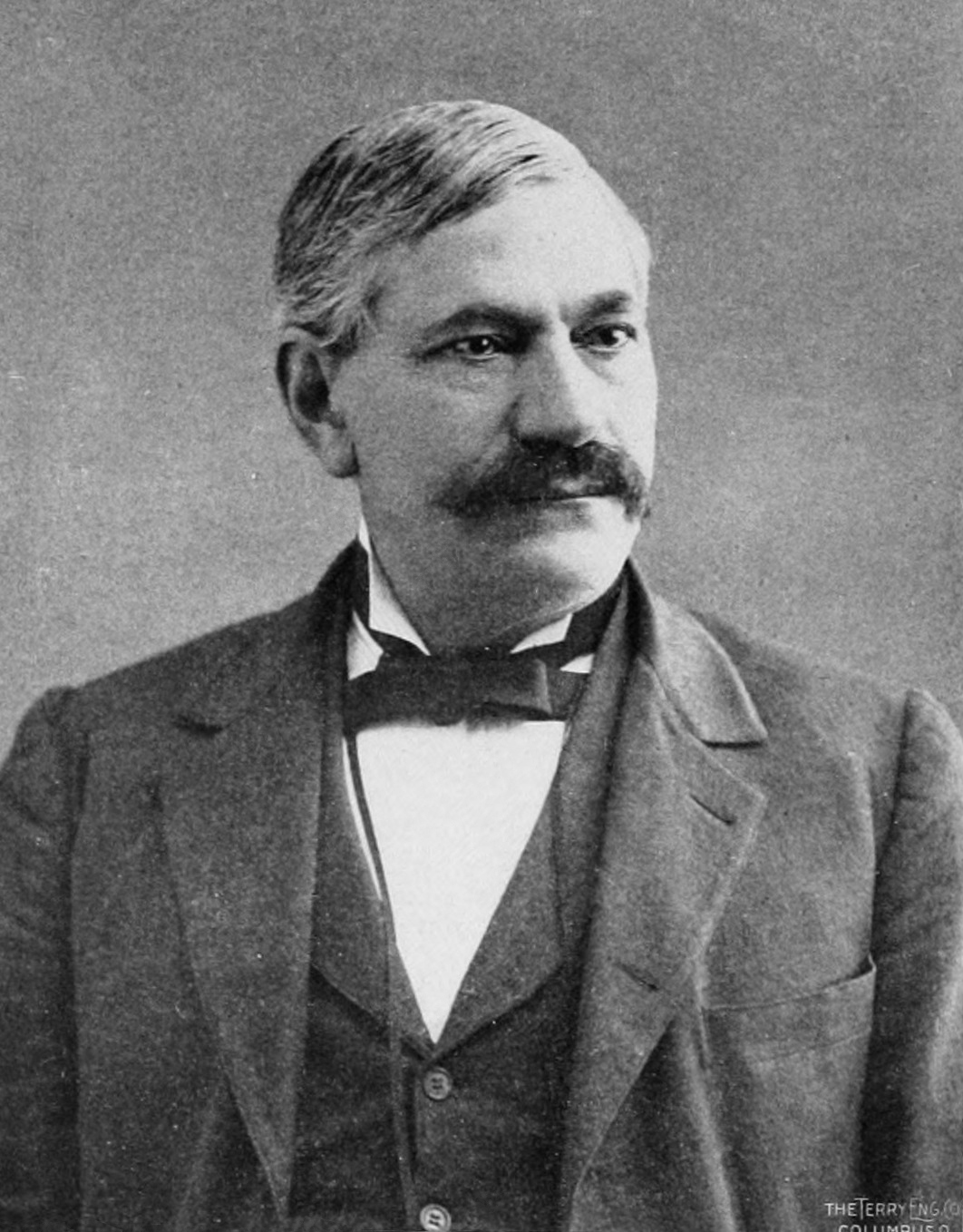

Member of the U.S. House of Representatives from Ohio's 5th district
- In office March 4, 1897 – March 3, 1901
- Preceded by: Francis B. De Witt
- Succeeded by: John S. Snook

Personal details
- Born: November 14, 1849 Dundee, Scotland, U.K.
- Died: February 12, 1915 (aged 65) Napoleon, Ohio, U.S.
- Resting place: Glenwood Cemetery, Napoleon
- Party: Democratic
- Spouse: Clara E. Bowers
- Children: four

Military service
- Allegiance: United States of America
- Branch/service: United States Army
- Years of service: 1866 – 1869
- Unit: 4th Regiment of Artillery

David Meekison (November 14, 1849 – February 12, 1915) was an American lawyer and politician who served as a two-term U.S. representative from Ohio from 1897 to 1901.

== Early life and career ==
Born in Dundee, Scotland, Meekison immigrated to the United States in 1855 with his parents, who settled in Napoleon, Ohio. He attended the common schools and was then apprenticed to the printer's trade. He served with the artillery in the United States Army from 1866 to 1869.

After mustering out of the service, Meekison returned to Napoleon and studied law. He was appointed city clerk in 1872.

He was admitted to the bar in 1873 and commenced practice in Napoleon, Ohio. He served as prosecuting attorney of Henry County from 1873 to 1879. He was a probate judge from 1881 to 1888. He served as delegate to the Democratic National Convention in 1884. He later engaged in banking and established the Meekison Bank at Napoleon in 1886. He served as mayor of Napoleon from 1890 to 1897.

== Congress ==
Meekison was elected as a Democrat to the Fifty-fifth and Fifty-sixth Congresses (March 4, 1897 – March 3, 1901).

== Later career ==
He was not a candidate for renomination in 1900 and subsequently resumed the practice of his profession. He also engaged in banking.

== Family life ==
He married Clara E. Bowers of Napoleon, August 24, 1881, and she and four children survived him.

== Death ==
He died in Napoleon, Ohio, February 12, 1915, and was interred in Glenwood Cemetery.

U.S. House of Representatives
Preceded by Francis B. De Witt	Member of the U.S. House of Representatives from Ohio's 5th congressional district 1897-1901	Succeeded by John S. Snook
