= Americus V. Rice =

American politician

Americus Rice
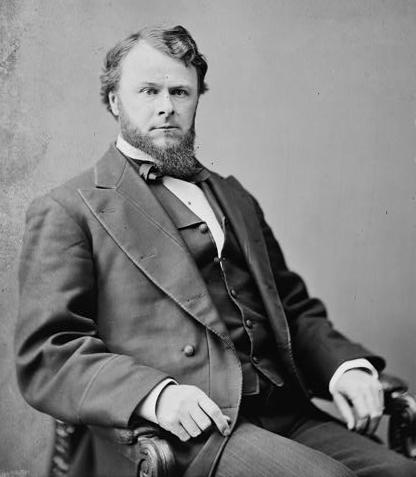

Member of the U.S. House of Representatives from Ohio's 5th district
- In office March 4, 1875 – March 3, 1879
- Preceded by: Charles N. Lamison
- Succeeded by: Benjamin Le Fevre

Personal details
- Born: Americus Vespucius Rice; November 18, 1835 Perrysville, Ohio, US
- Died: April 4, 1904 (aged 68) Washington, D.C., US
- Resting place: Arlington National Cemetery
- Party: Democratic
- Spouse: Mary A. Metcalf Rice
- Children: Mary Rice, Katherine Rice
- Relatives: Julia Rice Seney (sister)
- Profession: Politician, banker, businessman

Military service
- Allegiance: United States of America; Union
- Branch/service: United States Army; Union Army
- Rank: Brigadier General
- Unit: 21st Ohio Infantry; 57th Ohio Infantry
- Battles/wars: American Civil War

Americus Vespucius Rice (November 18, 1835 – April 4, 1904) was a nineteenth-century politician, banker, and businessman from Ohio. He served in the Union Army during the American Civil War and was appointed brigadier general at the end of the war, on May 31, 1865. From 1875 to 1879, he served two consecutive terms in the United States House of Representatives.

== Early life ==
Rice was born in Perrysville, Ohio, on November 18, 1835, to Clark Hammond Rice and Catherine (Mowers) Rice. He pursued in classical studies, attended Antioch College, graduated from Union College and studied law.

== Civil War ==
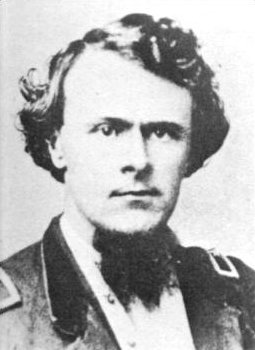
Brigadier General Americus V. Rice

At the outbreak of the Civil War, Rice was commissioned as a captain in the 21st Ohio Volunteer Infantry Regiment on April 27, 1861, and served until his regiment was mustered out of service on August 12 of the same year.

Rice was commissioned as a captain in the 57th Ohio Infantry on September 2, 1861. He was promoted to lieutenant colonel on February 8, 1862, and became the regiment's colonel on May 24, 1863.

As colonel of the 57th Ohio Infantry at the Battle of Kennesaw Mountain in the Atlanta campaign, he was wounded and his right leg was amputated.

On January 13, 1866, President Andrew Johnson nominated Rice for appointment as a brigadier general of volunteers to rank from a May 31, 1865, appointment date. (Note: President Johnson appointed Rice as a brigadier general on May 31, 1865, but did not send a nomination of the appointment to the United States Senate for confirmation until January 13, 1866.) Rice was mustered out of service on January 15, 1866. The United States Senate confirmed the appointment on February 23, 1866.

After the war, he became a member of the Ohio Commandery of the Military Order of the Loyal Legion of the United States – a military society consisting of officers who had served the Union and their descendants.

== Postbellum career ==
After the close of the war, Rice was manager of a private banking house in Ottawa, Ohio, was a delegate to the Democratic National Convention in 1872 and was elected a Democrat to the United States House of Representatives in 1874, serving from 1875 to 1879, not being a candidate for renomination in 1878. There, he served as chairman of the Committee on Invalid Pensions from 1877 to 1879. Afterward, he was president of A.V. Rice & Company, a banking concern in Ottawa, Ohio, was a director in various business enterprises and was appointed a pension agent for Ohio in 1893, serving from 1894 to 1898. Rice moved to Washington, D.C., in 1899 and engaged in banking and other various enterprises and was appointed a purchasing agent for the United States Census Bureau.

== Death and burial ==
He served in that role until his death in Washington, D.C., on April 4, 1904. He was interred in Arlington National Cemetery in Arlington, Virginia.

== Genealogy ==
Americus Vespucius Rice was a direct descendant of Edmund Rice, an English immigrant to Massachusetts Bay Colony, as follows:

- Americus Vespucius Rice, son of
  - Clark Hammond Rice (1804–1870), son of

  - Ebenezer Rice (1773–1821), son of
  - Samuel Rice (1752–1828), son of
  - Gershom Rice (1703 – ?), son of

      - Ephraim Rice (1665–1732), son of
      - Thomas Rice (1626–1681), son of

      - Edmund Rice (1594–1663)

== See also ==
- List of American Civil War generals (Union)

== Notes ==
U.S. House of Representatives
Preceded by Charles N. Lamison	Member of the U.S. House of Representatives from Ohio's 5th congressional district March 4, 1875 – March 3, 1879	Succeeded by Benjamin Le Fevre
Party political offices
Preceded by Jabez W. Fitch	Democratic Party nominee for Lieutenant Governor of Ohio; 1879	Succeeded by Edgar M. Johnson
