= Timothy T. Ansberry =

American politician (1871–1943)

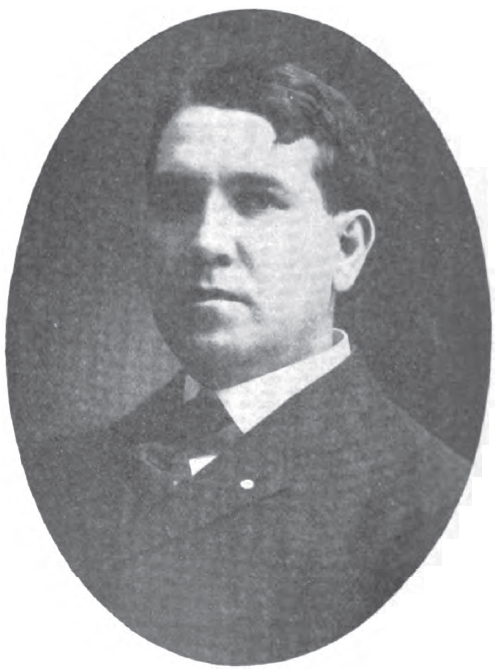

Member of the U.S. House of Representatives from Ohio's 5th district
- In office March 4, 1907 – January 9, 1915
- Preceded by: William Wildman Campbell
- Succeeded by: Nelson E. Matthews

Personal details
- Born: Timothy Thomas Ansberry; December 24, 1871 Defiance, Ohio, U.S.
- Died: July 5, 1943 (aged 71) New York City, U.S.
- Resting place: Mount Olivet Cemetery, Washington, D.C., U.S.
- Party: Democratic
- Education: University of Notre Dame

Timothy Thomas Ansberry (December 24, 1871 – July 5, 1943) was an early 20th-century American lawyer and politician who served four terms as a U.S. representative from Ohio from 1907 to 1915.

== Early life ==
Timothy T. Ansberry was born in Defiance, Ohio. He attended public schools. He graduated from the University of Notre Dame, South Bend, Indiana, in June 1893. He was admitted to the bar and commenced practice in Defiance, Ohio.

== Career ==
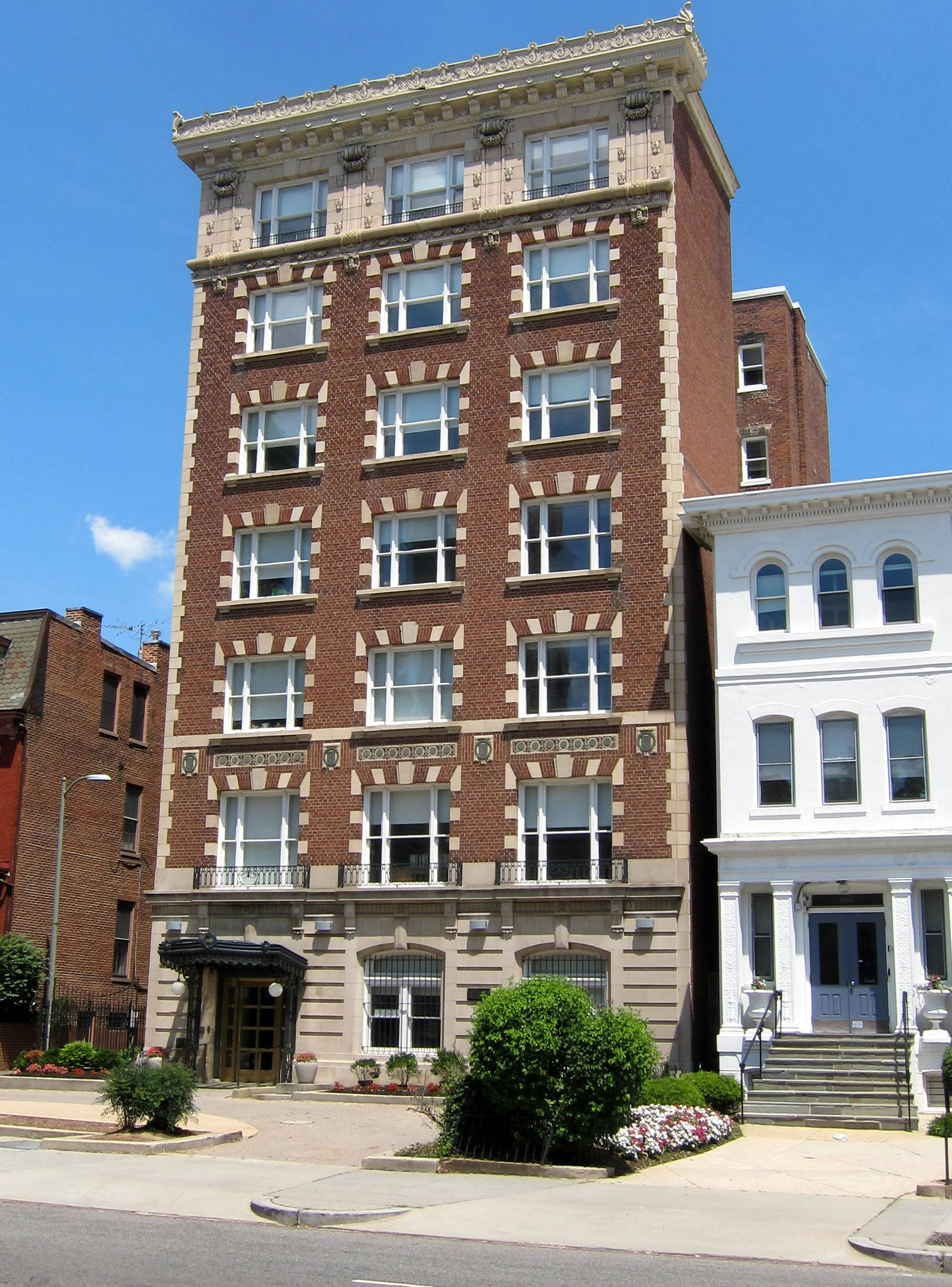
Ansberry's former residence in Washington, D.C.

Ansberry served as the Justice of the Peace from 1893 to 1895. He was prosecuting attorney of Defiance County, Ohio from 1895 to 1903.

He was an unsuccessful candidate for election in 1904 to the Fifty-ninth Congress.

=== Congress ===
Ansberry was elected as a Democrat to the Sixtieth and to the three succeeding Congresses and served from March 4, 1907, until January 9, 1915, when he resigned to accept a judicial position. He served as chairman of the Committee on Elections No. 1 (Sixty-second Congress).

=== Later career ===
He was appointed associate judge of the Ohio Court of Appeals, in which capacity he served until his resignation in 1916. He served as delegate to the 1920 Democratic National Convention at San Francisco and the 1924 Democratic National Convention at New York. Ansberry was a presidential elector in the 1916 presidential election.

He moved to Washington, D.C., in 1916 and engaged in the practice of law until his death.

== Death and burial ==
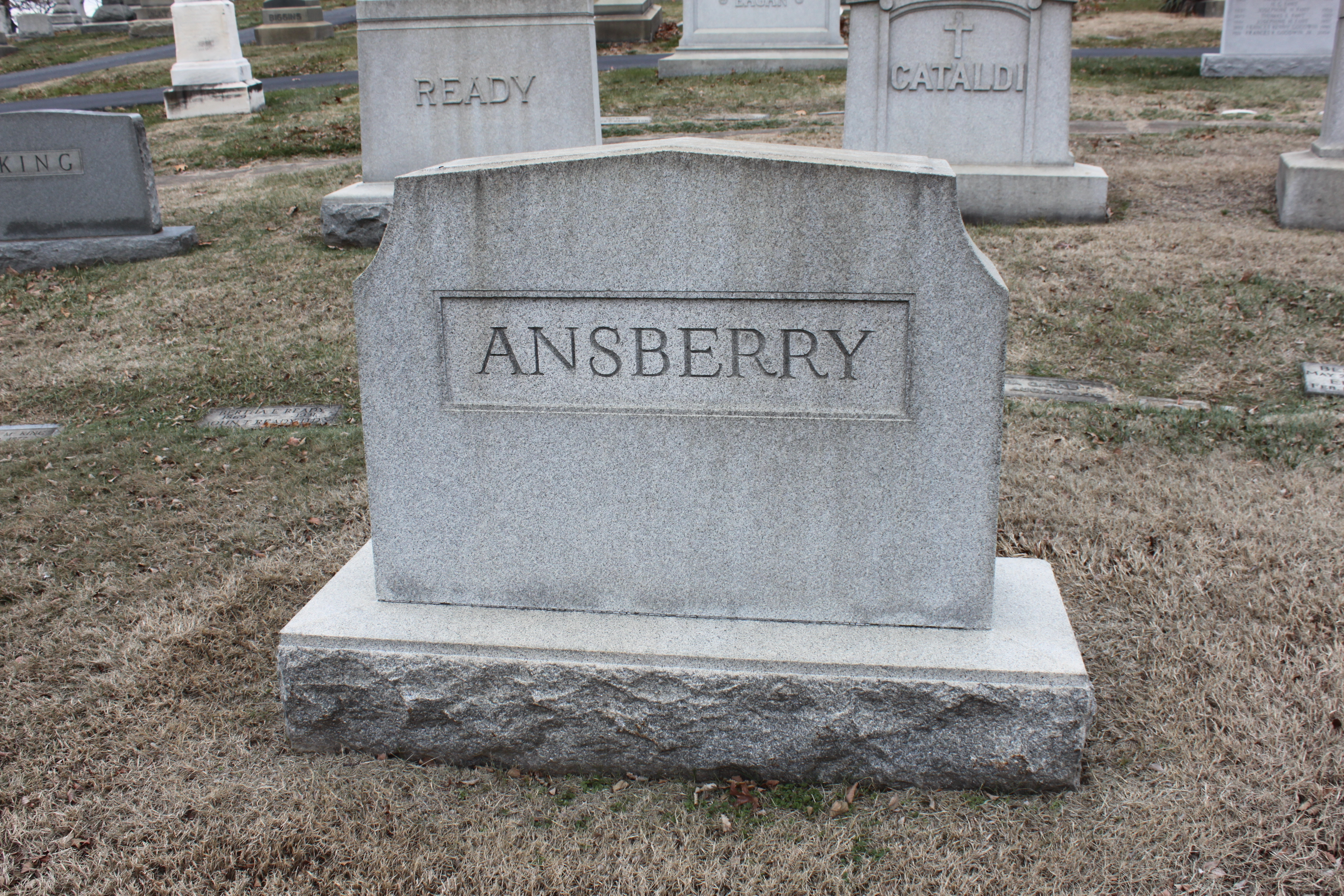
Grave of Ansberry at Mount Olivet Cemetery

Ansberry died in New York City on July 5, 1943. He was interred in Mount Olivet Cemetery in Washington, D.C.

== Sources ==
- United States Congress. "Timothy T. Ansberry (id: A000259)". Biographical Directory of the United States Congress.

U.S. House of Representatives
Preceded by William W. Campbell	Member of the U.S. House of Representatives from Ohio's 5th congressional district 1907–1915	Succeeded by Nelson E. Matthews
