= William Mungen =

American politician

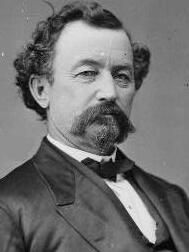

Member of the U.S. House of Representatives from Ohio's 5th district
- In office March 4, 1867 – March 3, 1871
- Preceded by: Francis C. Le Blond
- Succeeded by: Charles N. Lamison

Member of the Ohio Senate
- In office 1851-1852

Personal details
- Born: May 12, 1821 Baltimore, Maryland, US
- Died: September 9, 1887 (aged 66) Findlay, Ohio, US
- Resting place: Maple Grove Cemetery
- Party: Democratic
- Profession: Politician, lawyer, teacher, editor, publisher

William Mungen (May 12, 1821 – September 9, 1887) was a nineteenth-century politician, lawyer, teacher, editor and publisher who served as a Representative from Ohio for two terms from 1867 to 1871.

== Biography ==
Born in Baltimore, Maryland, Mungen moved to Ohio with his parents in 1830 where he attended common schools as a child. He taught school, was editor and publisher of the Findlay Democratic Courier and was auditor of Hancock County, Ohio from 1846 to 1850. He was a member of the Ohio Senate in 1851 and 1852, studied law and was admitted to the bar in 1853, commencing practice in Findlay, Ohio. Mungen was a delegate to the Democratic National Convention in 1856.

=== Civil War ===
At the outbreak of the Civil War, entered in the Union Army in 1861 as lieutenant colonel of the 57th Ohio Volunteer Infantry Regiment. He was later promoted to colonel the same year and served until 1863 when he was honorably discharged.

=== Congress ===
Mungen was elected a Democrat to the United States House of Representatives in 1866, serving from 1867 to 1871, not being a candidate for renomination in 1870.

=== Death and burial ===
Afterward, he resumed practicing law until his death in Findlay, Ohio on September 9, 1887. He was interred in Maple Grove Cemetery in Findlay.

U.S. House of Representatives
| Preceded by Francis C. Le Blond | Member of the U.S. House of Representatives from Ohio's 5th congressional district March 4, 1867 – March 3, 1871 | Succeeded by Charles N. Lamison |
