= David F. Day =

US Army soldier & newspaper publisher (1847-1914)

David Frakes Day
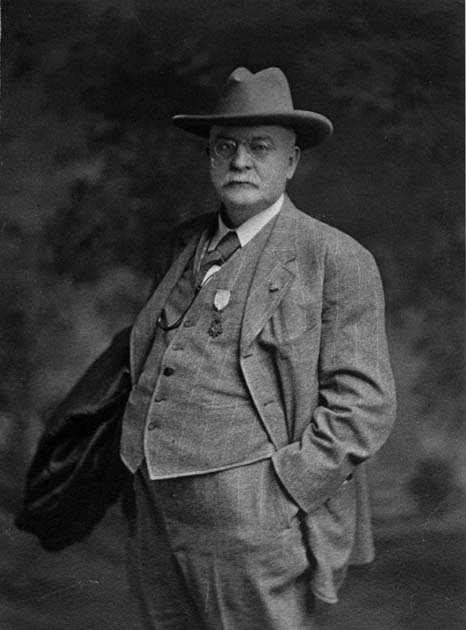
- Born: March 7, 1847; Dallasburg, Ohio
- Died: June 22, 1914 (aged 67); Denver, Colorado
- Burial place: Riverside Cemetery, Denver, Colorado
- Military career
- Allegiance: United States
- Branch: United States Army; Union Army
- Service years: 1862 - 1865
- Rank: Private
- Unit: 57th Ohio Volunteer Infantry Regiment - Company D
- Conflicts: American Civil War • Siege of Vicksburg
- Awards: Medal of Honor

David Frakes Day (1847 – 1914) was a Union Army soldier during the American Civil War, and later a newspaper publisher. He received the Medal of Honor for gallantry during the Siege of Vicksburg on May 22, 1863.

== Early military service ==
Day enlisted in the army from Ohio in January 1862, at the age of 14. He served with the 57th Ohio Infantry, and fought in the battles of Shiloh and Stones River.

== Union assault ==
On May 22, 1863, General Ulysses S. Grant ordered an assault on the Confederate heights at Vicksburg, Mississippi. The plan called for a storming party of volunteers to build a bridge across a moat and plant scaling ladders against the enemy embankment in advance of the main attack. The volunteers knew the odds were against survival and the mission was called, in nineteenth century vernacular, a "forlorn hope". Only single men were accepted as volunteers and even then, twice as many men as needed came forward and were turned away. The assault began in the early morning following a naval bombardment.

The Union soldiers came under enemy fire immediately and were pinned down in the ditch they were to cross. Despite repeated attacks by the main Union body, the men of the forlorn hope were unable to retreat until nightfall. Of the 150 men in the storming party, nearly half were killed. Seventy-nine of the survivors were awarded the Medal of Honor.

== Medal of Honor citation ==
For gallantry in the charge of the volunteer storming party on 22 May 1863.

== Later life ==
Following his actions at Vicksburg, Major General Francis P. Blair appointed Day as an orderly on his staff, and he eventually became Blair's chief scout, despite his young age. During his time as a scout, he claimed to have been captured at least 3 times, but always escaped. He was discharged in August 1865.

By 1879, Day had settled in Colorado, and started publishing a newspaper called "The Solid Muldoon", lampooning politicians and prominent local citizens. He sold his paper in 1892 and founded a new one, called "The Durango Democrat". Known for his wit and sarcasm, by the end of the century he had dozens of libel suits pending against him. He died in Denver on 22 June 1914, and was buried at Riverside Cemetery.

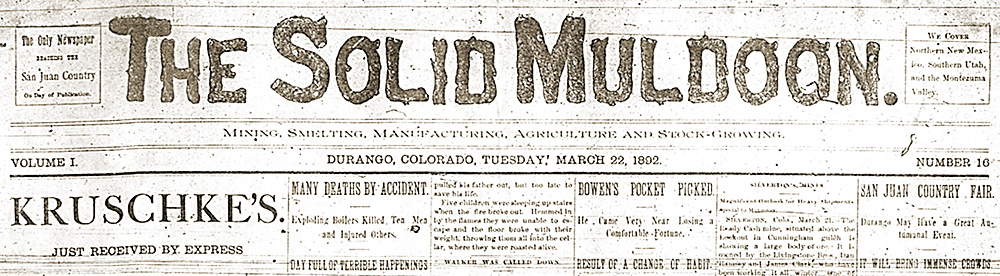
Masthead for the Solid Muldoon Newspaper, published by David Frakes Day.

== See also ==
- List of American Civil War Medal of Honor recipients: A–F
