= Francis B. De Witt =

American politician (1849–1929)

Member of the U.S. House of Representatives from Ohio's 5th district
- In office March 4, 1895 – March 3, 1897
- Preceded by: Dennis D. Donovan
- Succeeded by: David Meekison

Personal details
- Born: March 11, 1849 Jackson County, Indiana, U.S.
- Died: March 21, 1929 (aged 80) Standish, Michigan, U.S.
- Resting place: Live Oak Cemetery, Paulding, Ohio
- Party: Republican
- Spouse(s): Dell V. William; Virginia Darby
- Education: National Normal University; Ohio Wesleyan University

Military service
- Allegiance: United States
- Branch/service: Union Army
- Unit: 46th Ohio Infantry; 121st Ohio Infantry
- Battles/wars: American Civil War

Francis Byron De Witt (March 11, 1849 – March 21, 1929) was an American lawyer, farmer, and politician who served one term as a U.S. representative from Ohio from 1895 to 1897. A Republican, he held elected office in two states over a span of more than three decades, serving in both the Ohio and Michigan legislatures in addition to his term in Congress.

== Biography ==
DeWitt was born on March 11, 1849, in Jackson County, Indiana, to Francis and Sarah W. DeWitt. In 1854 he moved with his parents to a farm in Delaware County, Ohio. He attended the common schools and high school in Galena, Ohio, and later studied at National Normal University in Lebanon, Ohio, and at Ohio Wesleyan University in Delaware, Ohio.

During the Civil War, DeWitt enlisted in the 46th Ohio Infantry Regiment at the age of twelve, but was mustered out for a temporary disability. He reenlisted in 1862 in the 121st Ohio Infantry Regiment, and served until the end of the war, spending part of his service as a prisoner of war at the Salisbury, North Carolina, Danville, Virginia, and Libby (Richmond, Virginia) prisons.

De Witt moved to Paulding, Ohio in 1872, where he taught school before turning to studying law. Admitted to the bar in 1875, he practiced in Paulding until 1891, when he took up agricultural pursuits. He represented his district in the Ohio House of Representatives from 1892 to 1895.

DeWitt married Dell V. William on April 29, 1875, in Paulding. They had seven children. He later remarried to Virginia Darby.

=== Congress ===
DeWitt was elected as a Republican to the 54th United States Congress, where he served a single term from March 4, 1895, to March 3, 1897, and was an unsuccessful candidate for reelection in 1896.

=== Later life ===
After leaving Congress he resumed farming near Paulding. In 1903 De Witt relocated to Standish, Michigan, and returned to the practice of law. He served as register of deeds from 1911 to 1920 and represented his district in the Michigan House of Representatives from 1920 to 1922. He was elected prosecuting attorney of Arenac County, Michigan in 1926 and reelected in 1928, serving in that office until his death.

De Witt died in Standish, Michigan, on March 21, 1929, at the age of 80. He was interred in Live Oak Cemetery in Paulding, Ohio.

Ohio House of Representatives
Preceded by F. W. Knapp	Representative from Paulding County; January 4, 1892-March 3, 1895	Succeeded by R. S. Murphy
U.S. House of Representatives
Preceded by Dennis D. Donovan	United States Representative from Ohio's 5th congressional district March 4, 1895–March 3, 1897	Succeeded by David Meekison
