= Nelson E. Matthews =

American politician

Nelson Matthews

Member of the U.S. House of Representatives from Ohio's 5th district
- In office March 4, 1915 – March 3, 1917
- Preceded by: Timothy T. Ansberry
- Succeeded by: John S. Snook

Personal details
- Born: Nelson Edwin Matthews; April 14, 1852 Ottawa, Ohio, U.S.
- Died: October 13, 1917 (aged 65) Maumee, Ohio, U.S.
- Resting place: Fort Meigs Cemetery, Perrysburg, Ohio
- Party: Republican

Nelson Edwin Matthews (April 14, 1852 – October 13, 1917) was an American politician who served one term as a U.S. representative from Ohio, from 1915 until he died in 1917.

== Biography ==
Born in Ottawa, Ohio, Matthews attended public schools. He was involved in various pursuits in Ottawa, including banking, mercantile, and manufacturing. He served as a delegate to the Republican National Convention in 1908 and the fourth State constitutional convention in 1912.

=== Congress ===
Matthews was elected as a Republican to the Sixty-fourth Congress (March 4, 1915 – March 3, 1917). However, he was unsuccessful in his bid for reelection in 1916 to the Sixty-fifth Congress.

== Death and burial ==
He died in Maumee, Ohio, on October 13, 1917. He was interred in Fort Meigs Cemetery, Perrysburg, Ohio.

== Sources ==
- United States Congress. "Nelson E. Matthews (id: M000254)". Biographical Directory of the United States Congress.

U.S. House of Representatives
Preceded by Timothy T. Ansberry	Member of the U.S. House of Representatives from Ohio's 5th congressional district 1915-1917	Succeeded by John S. Snook
