= Charles J. Thompson =

American politician

Charles James Thompson
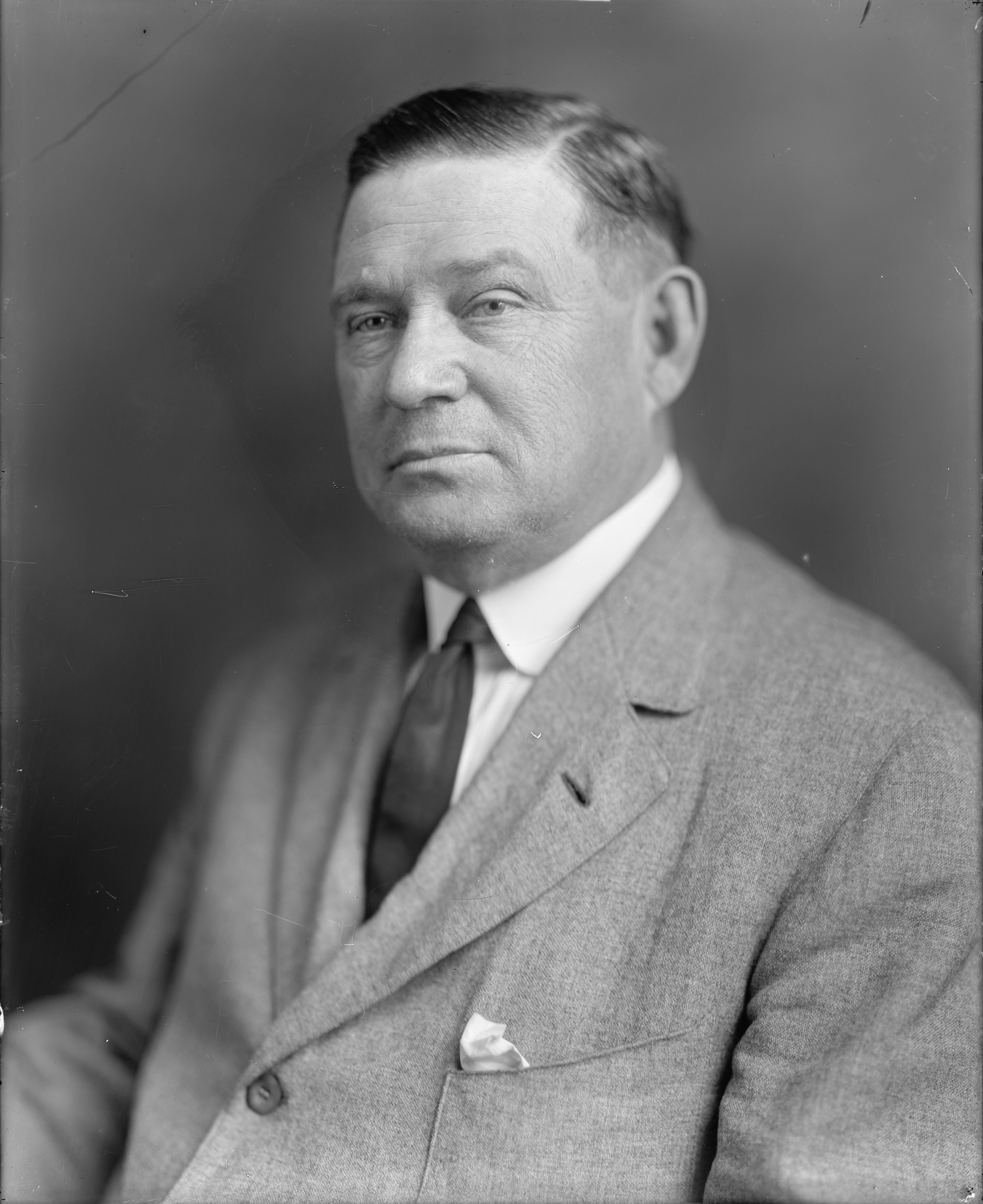

Member of the U.S. House of Representatives from Ohio's 5th district
- In office March 4, 1919 – March 3, 1931
- Preceded by: John S. Snook
- Succeeded by: Frank C. Kniffin

Personal details
- Born: January 24, 1862 Wapakoneta, Ohio, U.S.
- Died: March 27, 1932 (aged 70) Albuquerque, New Mexico, U.S.
- Resting place: Riverside Cemetery, Defiance, Ohio
- Party: Republican
- Education: Ohio Wesleyan University

Charles James Thompson (January 24, 1862 – March 27, 1932) was a U.S. representative from Ohio from 1919 to 1931.

== Biography ==
Born in Wapakoneta, Ohio, Thompson attended the public schools and the Ohio Wesleyan University, Delaware, Ohio. Learned the art of printing 1876–1879. He worked as a journeyman printer in various cities in Ohio, Indiana, and Illinois 1879–1884. He returned to Wapakoneta in 1885 and was employed as a bookkeeper until 1889. He moved to Defiance, Ohio, in 1889 and was owner and publisher of the Defiance Express until 1902. He served as member of the Republican State central committee in 1893 and 1894. Postmaster of Defiance 1898–1915. He was an unsuccessful candidate for mayor in 1915.

=== Congress ===
Thompson was elected as a Republican to the Sixty-sixth and to the five succeeding Congresses (March 4, 1919 – March 3, 1931). He was an unsuccessful candidate for reelection in 1930 to the Seventy-second Congress.

=== Later life ===
He retired from business pursuits. He died in Albuquerque, New Mexico, while on a visit, March 27, 1932. He was interred in Riverside Cemetery, Defiance, Ohio.

== Sources ==
- United States Congress. "Charles J. Thompson (id: T000194)". Biographical Directory of the United States Congress.

U.S. House of Representatives
| Preceded by John S. Snook | Member of the U.S. House of Representatives from Ohio's 5th congressional district 1919-1931 | Succeeded by Frank C. Kniffin |
