= Frank C. Kniffin =

American lawyer and politician

Frank Kniffin
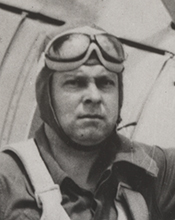

Member of the U.S. House of Representatives from Ohio's 5th district
- In office March 4, 1931 – January 3, 1939
- Preceded by: Charles J. Thompson
- Succeeded by: Cliff Clevenger

Personal details
- Born: Frank Charles Kniffin; April 26, 1894 Stryker, Ohio, U.S.
- Died: April 30, 1968 (aged 74) Napoleon, Ohio, U.S.
- Resting place: Wauseon Cemetery
- Party: Democratic

Frank Charles Kniffin (April 26, 1894 – April 30, 1968) was an American lawyer and politician who served four terms as a U.S. representative from Ohio from 1931 to 1939.

== Early life and career ==
Born on a farm near Stryker, Ohio, Kniffin attended the public schools and then studied law. He was admitted to the bar in 1919 and commenced practice in Napoleon, Ohio.

He was an unsuccessful candidate for election in 1922 to the Sixty-eighth Congress, in 1924 to the Sixty-ninth Congress, in 1926 to the Seventieth Congress, and in 1928 to the Seventy-first Congress.

== Congress ==
Kniffin was elected as a Democrat to the Seventy-second and to the three succeeding Congresses (March 4, 1931–January 3, 1939). He was an unsuccessful candidate for reelection in 1938 to the Seventy-sixth Congress. As of 2020, he is the last Democrat to represent this district in Congress.

== Later career and death ==
Following the end of his term, he resumed the practice of law.

He served as a referee in bankruptcy, northern district of Ohio, western division, from 1939 until his death in Napoleon, Ohio, April 30, 1968. He was interred in Wauseon Cemetery, Wauseon, Ohio.

U.S. House of Representatives
Preceded by Charles J. Thompson	Member of the U.S. House of Representatives from Ohio's 5th congressional district 1931-1939	Succeeded by Cliff Clevenger
