= Charles N. Lamison =

American politician

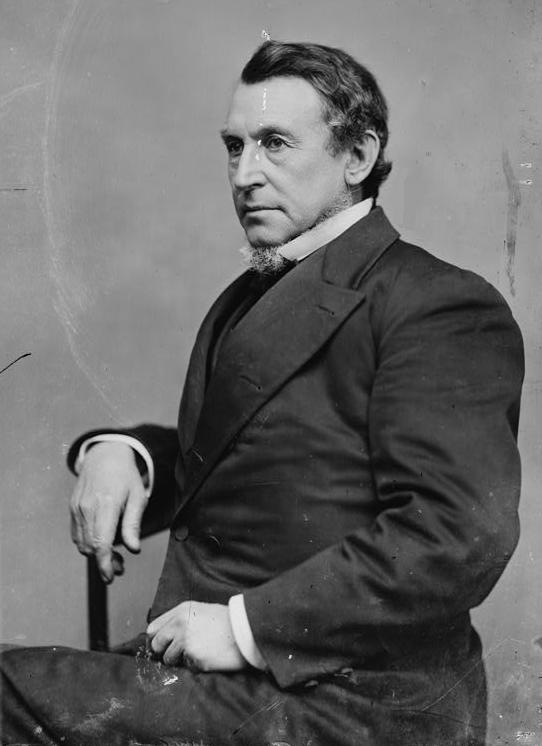

Member of the U.S. House of Representatives from Ohio's 5th district
- In office March 4, 1871 – March 3, 1875
- Preceded by: William Mungen
- Succeeded by: Americus V. Rice

Personal details
- Born: Charles Nelson Lamison c. 1826 Columbia County, Pennsylvania, US
- Died: April 24, 1896 (aged 69–70) Topeka, Kansas, US
- Resting place: Woodlawn Cemetery in Lima, Ohio
- Party: Democratic
- Profession: Politician, Lawyer

Charles Nelson Lamison (c. 1826 – April 24, 1896) was an American politician, soldier, and lawyer who was a two-term United States congressman from Ohio. He served in the United States House of Representatives from 1871 to 1875.

== Early life and career ==
Born in Columbia County, Pennsylvania, Lamison moved with his father in 1836 to Dalton, Ohio, where he was privately instructed in elementary branches. He studied law and was admitted to the bar in 1848, commencing practice in Dalton. In 1852, he moved to Lima, Ohio, where he resumed practicing law and was elected prosecuting attorney of Allen County, Ohio, in 1853. He was defeated for reelection in the position in 1855, but was elected back again in 1857.

=== Civil War ===
At the outbreak of the Civil War, Lamison enlisted in the Union Army and was elected as the initial captain of Company F of the 20th Ohio Infantry, serving in Northern Virginia. He later assisted in raising the 81st Ohio Infantry of which he was appointed as the major.

== Congress ==
After the close of the war, he resumed practicing law in Lima and was an unsuccessful Democratic candidate for the United States House of Representatives in 1866. Lamison was elected to the House of Representatives in 1870, serving from 1871 to 1875, not being a candidate for renomination in 1874.

== Later career and death ==
Afterwards, he was appointed an attorney for several railroad companies and was appointed to the United States General Land Office in 1892, headquartered in Dodge City, Kansas.

Lamison died in Topeka, Kansas, on April 24, 1896, and was interred in Woodlawn Cemetery in Lima, Ohio.

U.S. House of Representatives
Preceded by William Mungen	Member of the U.S. House of Representatives from Ohio's 5th congressional district March 4, 1871 – March 3, 1875	Succeeded by Americus V. Rice
