= Cliff Clevenger =

American politician (1885–1960)

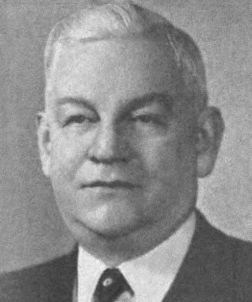

Member of the U.S. House of Representatives from Ohio's 5th district
- In office January 3, 1939 – January 3, 1959
- Preceded by: Frank C. Kniffin
- Succeeded by: Del Latta

Personal details
- Born: August 20, 1885 Brown County, Nebraska, US
- Died: December 13, 1960 (aged 75) Tiffin, Ohio, US
- Resting place: Oak Hill Cemetery, Neenah, Wisconsin, US
- Party: Republican

Cliff Clevenger (August 20, 1885 – December 13, 1960) was a United States representative from Ohio. He served ten terms in Congress from 1939 to 1959.

== Biography ==
Cliff Clevenger was born on a ranch near Long Pine, Nebraska. He moved in 1895 with his parents to Lacona, Iowa, where he attended the public schools. He engaged in the mercantile business at Marengo, Iowa, 1901–1903 and at Appleton, Wisconsin, 1904–1914. He was also president of the Clevenger Stores, Bowling Green, Ohio, 1915–1926 and manager of the F. W. Uhlman Stores, Bryan, Ohio, 1927–1938.

=== Congress ===
Clevenger was elected as a Republican to the Seventy-sixth and to the nine succeeding Congresses (January 3, 1939 - January 3, 1959). He was not a candidate for renomination in 1958. He died at his home in Tiffin, Ohio, in 1960.

Clevenger voted against the Civil Rights Act of 1957.

=== Death ===
He died on December 13, 1960, and was buried in Oak Hill Cemetery, Neenah, Wisconsin.

U.S. House of Representatives
Preceded by Frank C. Kniffin	Member of the U.S. House of Representatives from Ohio's 5th congressional district 1939-1959	Succeeded by Del Latta
