= John S. Snook =

American politician

John Stout Snook
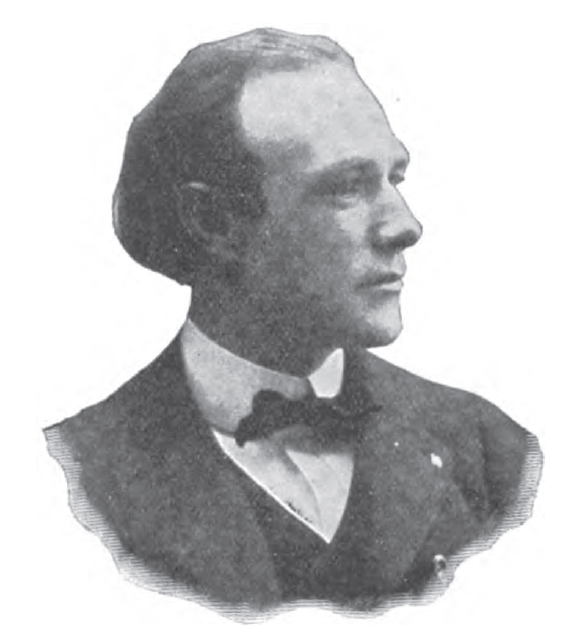

Member of the U.S. House of Representatives from Ohio's 5th district
- In office March 4, 1901 – March 3, 1905
- Preceded by: David Meekison
- Succeeded by: William Wildman Campbell
- In office March 4, 1917 – March 3, 1919
- Preceded by: Nelson E. Matthews
- Succeeded by: Charles J. Thompson

Personal details
- Born: December 18, 1862 Antwerp, Ohio, U.S.
- Died: September 19, 1952 (aged 89) Paulding, Ohio, U.S.
- Party: Democratic
- Education: Cincinnati Law School

John Stout Snook (December 18, 1862 – September 19, 1952) was an American lawyer, jurist, and politician who served as a U.S. representative from Ohio from 1901 to 1905, and again from 1917 to 1919.

== Biography ==
Born near Antwerp, Ohio, Snook was graduated from the Antwerp grade schools in 1881. He attended the Ohio Wesleyan University, Delaware, Ohio, and graduated from the Cincinnati Law School in May 1887. Snook was admitted to the bar the same year and began practice in Antwerp, Ohio, then moved to Paulding, Ohio, in 1890.

=== Congress ===
Snook was elected as a Democrat to the Fifty-seventh and Fifty-eighth Congresses (March 4, 1901 – March 3, 1905). He was not a candidate for renomination in 1904, but resumed the practice of law in Paulding. Snook was later a delegate to the Democratic National Conventions in 1912 and 1932, and served as judge of the court of common pleas from 1913 to 1915.

In 1917, Snook was elected to the Sixty-fifth Congress (March 4, 1917 – March 3, 1919), but was not reelected in 1918.

== Later career and death ==
He returned to practicing law. Snook again served as judge of the court of common pleas from 1930 to 1938, after which he retired. He died in Paulding, Ohio on September 19, 1952, and was interred in Live Oak Cemetery.

U.S. House of Representatives
Preceded by David Meekison	Member of the U.S. House of Representatives from Ohio's 5th congressional district 1901-1905	Succeeded by William W. Campbell
Preceded by Nelson E. Matthews	Member of the U.S. House of Representatives from Ohio's 5th congressional district 1917-1919	Succeeded by Charles J. Thompson
