= Del Latta =

American politician

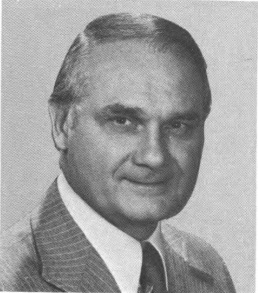

Ranking Member of the House Budget Committee
- In office January 3, 1975 – January 3, 1989
- Preceded by: Position established
- Succeeded by: Bill Frenzel

Member of the U.S. House of Representatives from Ohio's 5th district
- In office January 3, 1959 – January 3, 1989
- Preceded by: Cliff Clevenger
- Succeeded by: Paul Gillmor

Member of the Ohio State Senate
- In office 1953–1958

Personal details
- Born: Delbert Leroy Latta; March 5, 1920 Weston, Ohio, US
- Died: May 12, 2016 (aged 96) Bowling Green, Ohio, US
- Resting place: Union Cemetery, McComb, Ohio, US
- Party: Republican
- Spouse: Rose Mary Kiene
- Children: 2, including Bob
- Education: Findlay College; Ohio Northern University (LLB, AB)

Military service
- Branch/service: United States Army; United States Marine Corps
- Years of service: 1938–1941 (Army); 1942–1943 (Marines)
- Unit: Ohio National Guard; 37th Infantry Division; Marine Forces Reserve
- Del Latta's voice Del Latta criticizes the rule for debate of plant closing and trade bills Recorded July 13, 1988

Delbert Leroy Latta (March 5, 1920 – May 12, 2016) was an American lawyer and politician who served 15 terms as a United States representative from Ohio's 5th district from 1959 to 1989. A Republican, he is one of the state's longest-serving politicians as well as the father of Bob Latta, who has held his father's congressional seat since 2007.

== Life and career ==
Latta was born in Weston, Ohio, the son of Bessie Viola (Thompson) and Lester Latta. He attended the public schools in North Baltimore, Ohio, and graduated from McComb High School in 1938. He attended Findlay College, 1939–1940; Ohio Northern University, LL.B, 1943, and from the same university, A.B., 1945. He served in the Ohio National Guard and the United States Army, 37th Division, 1938–1941, and in the United States Marine Corps Reserve in 1942 and 1943.

He was admitted to the bar in 1944 and was a member of the Ohio Senate from 1953 to 1958, serving three terms. Del Latta practiced law and taught at Ohio Northern University. He was a delegate to the 1968 Republican National Convention.

=== Congress ===
He was elected as a Republican to the 86th and to the 14 succeeding Congresses from January 3, 1959, to January 3, 1989.

In the United States House of Representatives, Latta served on the Agriculture and Rules Committees, as well as being appointed to serve on the House Judiciary Committee during the Watergate hearings. He was one of ten Representatives on the Judiciary Committee supporting President Richard Nixon during impeachment hearings, voting 'no' on all three articles of impeachment. However, he turned against Nixon upon the release of the smoking gun tape, and stated he would vote for impeachment when the articles came up for vote in the full House, as did all of the Republicans who voted against impeachment in committee. Latta said that hearing Nixon's involvement in the cover-up indicated that "we certainly weren't given the truth" by the White House. He also served as the ranking Republican on the House Budget Committee from 1975 to his retirement in 1989. In 1981, he co-sponsored the Gramm-Latta Omnibus Reconciliation Bill which implemented President Ronald Reagan's economic program, including an increase in military spending and some cuts in discretionary and mandatory spending. The law also mandated the Economic Recovery Tax Act of 1981 (the Kemp-Roth Tax Cut).

== Legacy ==
In 2003, the Bowling Green, Ohio, Post Office was designated the Delbert L. Latta Post Office Building, Public Law 108-50.

== Personal life ==
Latta was married to the former Rose Mary Kiene, in rural Pandora, Ohio. They had two children, Rose Ellen and Robert (who currently serves in the congressional seat he formerly held), five grandchildren and four great-grandchildren.

== Death ==
He died at a nursing home in Bowling Green, Ohio, on May 12, 2016.

U.S. House of Representatives
Preceded by Cliff Clevenger	Member of the U.S. House of Representatives from Ohio's 5th congressional district 1959–1989	Succeeded by Paul Gillmor
