= North Central Conference (OHSAA) =

Former high school athletic conference

The North Central Conference was an Ohio High School Athletic Association (OHSAA) athletic league whose final remaining members were located in northwest and north-central Ohio. The league's last day of operation was June 30, 2014.

== Members ==
The following schools were members of the conference at various times. During the conference's existence, membership was never more than ten schools or fewer than seven at one time. At the time of the conference's dissolution in 2014, there were eight members. Six of those schools—Buckeye Central, Cucyrus, Colonel Crawford, Crestline, Galion, and Wynford—were in Crawford County, along with Upper Sandusky in Wyandot County and Riverdale in Hancock County.

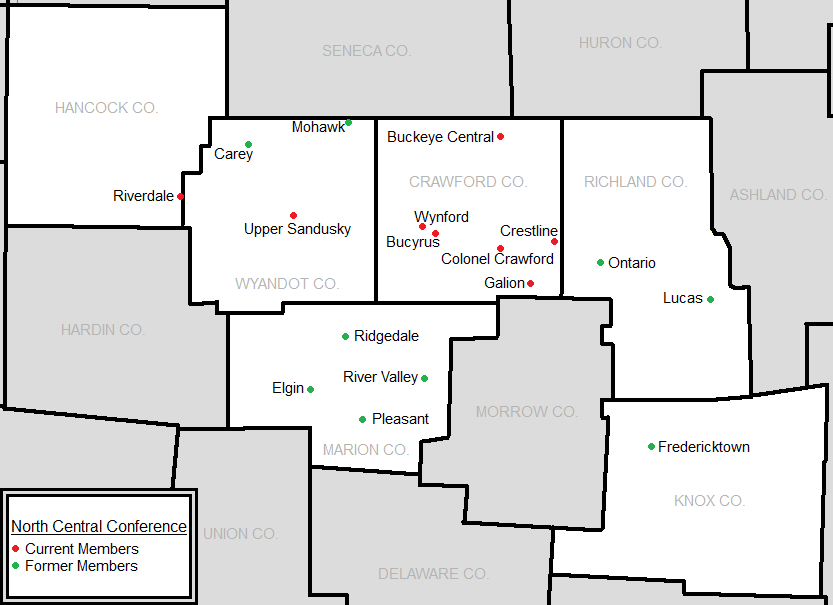
All-time members of the NCC

School	Nickname	Location	Colors	Type	Tenure
Buckeye Central	Bucks	New Washington	Scarlet, Gray	Public	1962–2014
Bucyrus	Redmen	Bucyrus	Red, White	Public	2002–2014
Carey	Blue Devils	Carey	Blue, White	Public	1963–1990
Colonel Crawford	Eagles	North Robinson	Black, Gold	Public	1962–2014
Crestline	Bulldogs	Crestline	Blue, White	Public	1990–2014
Elgin	Comets	Marion	Scarlet, Gray	Public	1962–1990
Fredericktown	Freddies	Fredericktown	Red, Gray	Public	1990–1999
Galion	Tigers	Galion	Orange, Blue	Public	2011–2014
Lucas	Cubs	Lucas	Orange, Black	Public	1998–2013
Mohawk	Warriors	Sycamore	Red, Black, White	Public	1962–1990
Ontario	Warriors	Ontario	Blue, Gold	Public	1990–2013
Pleasant	Spartans	Marion	Red, Black	Public	1962–1990
Ridgedale	Rockets	Morral	Columbia Blue, Red	Public	1962–1990
Riverdale	Falcons	Delaware Township	Royal Blue, White	Public	1962–2014
River Valley	Vikings	Caledonia	Blue, Gold	Public	1962–1990
Upper Sandusky	Rams	Upper Sandusky	Black, Orange	Public	2011–2014
Wynford	Royals	Bucyrus	Royal Blue, Gray	Public	1963–2014

== League history ==
The conference's first year was in the 1962–63 school year. The original members were: Buckeye Central, Colonel Crawford, Elgin, Mohawk, Pleasant, Ridgedale, River Valley and Riverdale. Carey and Wynford joined the NCC for the 1963–64 school year.

The league remained consistent until the 1990–91 school year when Elgin, Pleasant, Ridgedale and River Valley joined the newly formed Mid-Ohio Athletic Conference; Carey and Mohawk left for the Midland Athletic League; while Crestline, Fredericktown and Ontario joined the NCC. Lucas joined the NCC for the 1998–99 school year, while Fredericktown left for the Mid-Buckeye Conference in 1999-2000. Bucyrus joined the NCC for the 2002–03 school year, bringing the NCC to an eight team format.

Upper Sandusky High School and Galion High School were voted in as the league's ninth and tenth members on February 5 and March 4, 2009. Both began league competition for the 2011-12 school year.

The NCC was contacted by Loudonville and Willard in September 2011 for potential membership down the road. Loudonville's league was going to be down to two members in 2013 and Willard's shrinking enrollment had them considering options outside of the Northern Ohio League. Willard ultimately decided to remain in the NOL.

On December 1, 2011, Bucyrus, Buckeye Central, Colonel Crawford, Crestline, Riverdale, and Wynford announced they would be leaving the NCC to help form the new Northern 10 Athletic Conference in 2014 with Carey, Mohawk, Seneca East and Ridgedale. With just 4 members remaining (Galion, Lucas, Ontario, and Upper Sandusky) the league subsequently folded after the 2013-14 school year on June 30, 2014.

Both Upper Sandusky and Galion were invited to join the Mid-Ohio Athletic Conference in early 2012 as Red Division members, with both schools intended to replace Ridgedale in 2014. On February 26, 2012, Lucas announced it would leave the NCC a year before the league dissolved. They applied to join the Mid-Buckeye Conference and were granted membership for 2013. Ontario also announced in March 2012 that they would join the Northern Ohio League in 2013.

Riverdale was invited in April 2013 to join the Blanchard Valley Conference (BVC), which is primarily made up of other schools located in Hancock County. Riverdale accepted the invitation and joined the BVC before the N10 began athletic competition. As a result of Riverdale's departure from its N10 commitment, and despite a report that Upper Sandusky will bypass joining the Mid-Ohio Athletic Conference, the Rams will play the fall season in the MOAC before moving to the Northern 10 in the winter of the 2014-15 school year.

== Football champions ==
Year	Champions
1962	Mohawk, Riverdale, River Valley
1963	Ridgedale
1964	Riverdale
1965	Elgin
1966	River Valley
1967	Elgin
1968	Riverdale
1969	Pleasant
1970	Pleasant
1971	Pleasant
1972	Pleasant
1973	River Valley
1974	Buckeye Central
1975	Carey
1976	Pleasant
1977	River Valley
1978	Carey, Colonel Crawford
1979	Carey, Colonel Crawford
1980	Colonel Crawford, Wynford
1981	Buckeye Central
1982	Pleasant
1983	Elgin
1984	Colonel Crawford, River Valley
1985	Buckeye Central, Pleasant
1986	Carey, Colonel Crawford, River Valley
1987	Wynford
1988	Elgin, Wynford
1989	Pleasant
1990	Fredricktown, Wynford
1991	Riverdale
1992	Colonel Crawford
1993	Crestline, Colonel Crawford
1994	Buckeye Central
1995	Buckeye Central
1996	Crestline
1997	Wynford
1998	Wynford
1999	Wynford
2000	Crestline
2001	Ontario
2002	Wynford
2003	Ontario
2004	Ontario
2005	Wynford
2006	Wynford
2007	Wynford
2008	Wynford
2009	Wynford
2010	Wynford
2011	Wynford
2012	Galion
2013	Colonel Crawford, Galion

== Championships by school ==
Team	Championships
Wynford	15
Colonel Crawford	8
Pleasant	8
River Valley	6
Buckeye Central	5
Carey	4
Elgin	4
Riverdale	4
Crestline	3
Ontario	3
Mohawk	1
Ridgedale	1
