= Northern Ohio League =

High school athletic conference

The Northern Ohio League (NOL) was an Ohio High School Athletic Association athletic league in north central Ohio that began competition in 1944 and disbanded in 2017 after six of its seven members joined the Sandusky Bay Conference.

== All-time members ==
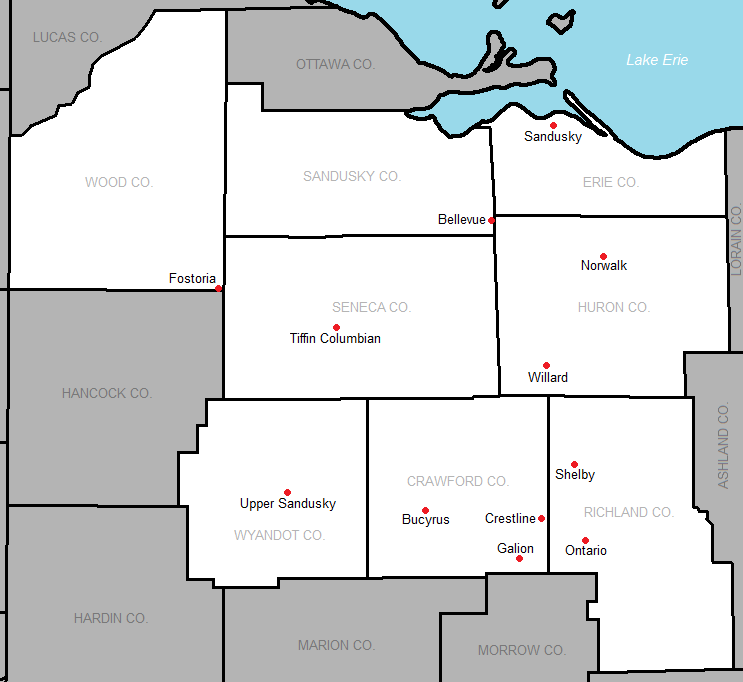
The all-time member schools of the NOL.

School	Nickname	Location	Colors	Tenure	Left for	Current league (2026)
Bellevue	Redmen	Bellevue	Red, White	1944-2017	SBC	SBC Lake Division, Northern Ohio Conference
Bucyrus	Redmen	Bucyrus	Red, White	1944–2002	NCC	N10
Columbian	Tornadoes	Tiffin	Blue, Gold	1954-2017	SBC	SBC Lake Division, Northern Ohio Conference
Crestline	Bulldogs	Crestline	Blue, White	1944–1954	JAC	MBC
Fostoria	Redmen	Fostoria	Red, Black	2002–2011	NBC	NBC
Galion	Tigers	Galion	Orange, Blue	1944–2011	NCC	MOAC
Norwalk	Truckers	Norwalk	Blue, Gold	1944-2017	SBC	SBC Lake Division, Northern Ohio Conference
Ontario	Warriors	Ontario	Blue, Gold	2013-2017	MOAC	MOAC
Sandusky	Blue Streaks	Sandusky	Blue, White	2011-2017	SBC	SBC Lake Division, Northern Ohio Conference
Shelby	Whippets	Shelby	Red, Gray	1944-2017	SBC	MOAC
Upper Sandusky	Rams	Upper Sandusky	Black, Orange	1944–2011	NCC	N10
Willard	Crimson Flashes	Willard	Crimson, White	1944-2017	SBC	SBC Bay/River Divisions

== League History ==
=== 1940s ===
- The NOL was formed in 1944 as the third-oldest high school league in Ohio. The original members were Bellevue, Bucyrus, Crestline, Galion, Norwalk, Shelby, Upper Sandusky and Willard.

=== 1950s ===
- In 1954, Crestline left and was replaced by Tiffin Columbian.

=== 2000s ===
- In what was accepted as a move based on competing with schools closer to their size, Bucyrus left after the 2001-02 school year for the North Central Conference and was replaced by Fostoria during winter of the 2002-03 school year. Fostoria had considered joining the NOL back in 1961.
- In February and March 2009, Upper Sandusky and Galion were accepted as the ninth and tenth members of the North Central Conference, beginning in fall 2011. Both schools had cited long travel for NOL games as partial factors. Meanwhile, Fostoria applied for membership in the Suburban Lakes League, but was initially turned down.
- In June 2009, the member schools of the NOL voted to accept Sandusky into the league, with competition beginning in 2011.
- On August 17, 2009, Fostoria voted to join the newly formed Northern Buckeye Conference in 2011 with Rossford, coming from the Northern Lakes League and Eastwood, Elmwood, Genoa, Lake, Otsego and Woodmore, all schools that are coming from the Suburban Lakes League.
- Clear Fork (Ohio Cardinal Conference) and Vermilion (West Shore Conference) are brought up as potential candidates to bring the league's membership back to 8 schools.

=== 2010s ===
- After a proposal to merge with the Sandusky Bay Conference was turned down by SBC principals, the NOL sought out additional members for their league.
- Vermilion was initially admitted as a future member in 2011, to join in all sports but football for 2012-13, and for football in 2013-14. However, at a board meeting on June 11, 2012, they decided to recommit to the West Shore Conference and not leave for the NOL in 2012.
- Ontario was admitted as a member of the NOL for the 2013-14 school year. This happened a year before the North Central Conference folded in 2014. Galion was also invited to re-join the league, but they ultimately decided to join the MOAC after citing concern over potential league trips to Vermilion.
- According to the Willard Times-Junction, letters were sent to schools to consider NOL membership: former NOL members Upper Sandusky and Galion; Clyde, Edison, and Huron of the Sandusky Bay Conference; Clear Fork of the Ohio Cardinal Conference; and Western Reserve of the Firelands Conference.
- Because of their shrinking enrollment, it had been rumored that Willard considered options outside of the NOL, including the newly formed Northern 10 Athletic Conference.
- On March 8, 2016, Ontario announced that they would join the Mid-Ohio Athletic Conference in the 2017-18 school year as they were not invited to join the SBC. Eight days later, it was announced by Clyde High School principal William J. Webb that the remaining six NOL schools would join the Sandusky Bay Conference for the 2017-18 school year, ending the NOL after 73 years of competition.

== Championships ==
=== Boys Championships ===
All league champions have been updated besides champions from Crestline, Fostoria and Galion.

Year	Football	Cross Country	Golf	Soccer	Basketball	Bowling	Swimming	Wrestling	Baseball	Track & Field	Tennis
1944-45	Bellevue, Galion				Bellevue	Started 2014-15	Started 2008-09				
1945-46	Upper Sandusky				Norwalk		Started 2008-09		Shelby	Upper Sandusky	
1946-47	Shelby				Bellevue, Upper Sandusky		Started 2008-09		Galion	Upper Sandusky	
1947-48	Upper Sandusky				Bellevue		Started 2008-09		Willard	Upper Sandusky	
1948-49	Bucyrus				Bucyrus		Started 2008-09		Galion		
1949-50	Shelby				Shelby, Willard		Started 2008-09			Upper Sandusky	
1950-51	Shelby				Bucyrus, Galion		Started 2008-09		Galion	Upper Sandusky	
1951-52	Bellevue		Norwalk		Bellevue		Started 2008-09		Willard	Shelby	
1952-53	Shelby, Upper Sandusky		Norwalk, Shelby		Bellevue, Bucyrus, Shelby		Started 2008-09		Bucyrus	Bellevue	
1953-54	Shelby		Shelby		Bellevue		Started 2008-09		Galion	Bellevue	
1954-55	Shelby		Shelby		Shelby		Started 2008-09		Shelby	Shelby	
1955-56	Upper Sandusky		Shelby		Shelby		Started 2008-09		Shelby	Shelby	
1956-57	Shelby				Shelby		Started 2008-09		Galion	Shelby	
1957-58	Galion				Galion		Started 2008-09			Bucyrus	
1958-59	Galion				Upper Sandusky, Willard		Started 2008-09			Bucyrus	
1959-60	Shelby				Norwalk		Started 2008-09			Bucyrus	
1960-61	Shelby				Willard		Started 2008-09			Bucyrus	
1961-62	Bellevue				Norwalk		Started 2008-09		Willard	Columbian	
1962-63	Bellevue				Columbian		Started 2008-09		Galion	Columbian	
1963-64	Bellevue, Bucyrus, Willard				Upper Sandusky		Started 2008-09		Galion	Columbian	Bellevue
1964-65	Bellevue				Bucyrus		Started 2008-09		Galion	Shelby	Bellevue
1965-66	Shelby		Shelby		Columbian		Started 2008-09		Galion	Columbian	Shelby
1966-67	Bellevue				Columbian		Started 2008-09		Galion	Columbian	Bellevue, Shelby
1967-68	Shelby				Bucyrus, Willard		Started 2008-09		Galion, Shelby	Shelby	Shelby
1968-69	Shelby	Norwalk			Bellevue		Started 2008-09		Galion, Shelby	Shelby	Bellevue
1969-70	Shelby	Columbian			Bellevue, Columbian		Started 2008-09		Columbian, Willard	Columbian	Bucyrus
1970-71	Bucyrus	Columbian	Upper Sandusky		Columbian		Started 2008-09	Norwalk	Columbian	Upper Sandusky	Bucyrus
1971-72	Columbian, Shelby	Columbian	Columbian		Galion		Started 2008-09	Norwalk	Galion	Shelby	Bucyrus
1972-73	Bellevue				Willard		Started 2008-09	Norwalk	Galion	Bellevue	
1973-74	Bellevue	Norwalk			Galion, Willard		Started 2008-09	Bellevue	Columbian		Shelby
1974-75	Columbian, Norwalk, Shelby	Bucyrus	Shelby		Galion		Started 2008-09	Norwalk	Norwalk	Shelby	Shelby
1975-76	Bellevue	Shelby			Willard		Started 2008-09	Bellevue	Norwalk, Shelby		Shelby
1976-77	Norwalk	Columbian	Shelby		Willard		Started 2008-09	Norwalk	Galion	Shelby	Norwalk
1977-78	Shelby	Columbian	Shelby		Columbian		Started 2008-09		Galion	Upper Sandusky	
1978-79	Galion	Columbian	Shelby		Willard		Started 2008-09	Norwalk	Bellevue	Columbian	Columbian
1979-80	Willard	Shelby	Shelby		Willard		Started 2008-09		Norwalk	Columbian	Willard
1980-81	Shelby	Shelby	Shelby		Willard		Started 2008-09	Columbian	Norwalk, Shelby	Galion	Willard
1981-82	Bellevue	Bellevue	Shelby		Willard		Started 2008-09	Norwalk	Shelby	Galion	Willard
1982-83	Bellevue	Bellevue	Shelby		Bellevue		Started 2008-09	Columbian	Shelby	Galion	Columbian
1983-84	Columbian		Bellevue		Willard		Started 2008-09		Shelby	Columbian	Columbian
1984-85	Shelby	Bellevue, Shelby	Bellevue		Bellevue		Started 2008-09		Shelby	Shelby	Norwalk
1985-86	Galion		Bellevue		Willard		Started 2008-09		Shelby	Shelby	Norwalk
1986-87	Columbian, Galion	Shelby	Upper Sandusky		Willard		Started 2008-09		Columbian, Shelby	Shelby	Norwalk
1987-88	Columbian	Columbian	Upper Sandusky		Willard		Started 2008-09	Bellevue	Columbian	Columbian	Norwalk
1988-89	Columbian	Shelby	Upper Sandusky		Willard		Started 2008-09	Bellevue	Bellevue	Columbian	Norwalk
1989-90	Columbian, Galion	Columbian, Shelby	Upper Sandusky		Bellevue		Started 2008-09	Bellevue	Bucyrus	Willard	Norwalk
1990-91	Willard	Columbian			Willard		Started 2008-09	Norwalk	Bucyrus, Galion	Columbian	Norwalk
1991-92	Bellevue, Bucyrus, Willard	Columbian	Bellevue		Shelby, Willard		Started 2008-09	Bellevue	Bucyrus	Columbian	Shelby
1992-93	Bellevue	Columbian	Bellevue		Bellevue, Willard		Started 2008-09	Bellevue	Bucyrus	Columbian	Bucyrus, Shelby
1993-94	Bellevue	Columbian	Bellevue, Shelby		Bellevue		Started 2008-09	Bellevue, Norwalk	Shelby, Upper Sandusky	Willard	Norwalk
1994-95	Bellevue	Columbian	Shelby		Bellevue		Started 2008-09	Bellevue	Bellevue, Columbian	Willard	Norwalk
1995-96	Columbian	Columbian	Upper Sandusky		Bellevue, Columbian		Started 2008-09	Bellevue	Columbian		Upper Sandusky
1996-97	Bellevue, Columbian		Willard		Bellevue		Started 2008-09	Bellevue	Bucyrus, Galion	Shelby	Norwalk
1997-98	Bellevue, Galion	Columbian	Upper Sandusky		Bellevue, Shelby		Started 2008-09	Bellevue	Bellevue	Shelby	Norwalk
1998-99	Shelby	Columbian	Shelby		Shelby		Started 2008-09	Bellevue	Shelby	Columbian	Norwalk
1999-00	Bellevue, Willard	Columbian	Shelby		Willard		Started 2008-09	Bellevue	Galion	Columbian	Norwalk
2000-01	Bellevue, Columbian, Shelby	Columbian	Shelby		Willard		Started 2008-09	Bellevue	Norwalk	Shelby	Norwalk
2001-02	Bellevue, Columbian	Columbian			Willard		Started 2008-09	Bellevue	Bellevue, Columbian	Shelby	Norwalk
2002-03	Columbian	Columbian	Shelby		Willard		Started 2008-09	Bellevue	Columbian	Shelby	Norwalk
2003-04	Bellevue, Columbian, Upper Sandusky	Columbian	Norwalk		Fostoria		Started 2008-09	Bellevue, Willard	Galion	Shelby	Norwalk, Willard
2004-05	Bellevue	Columbian	Upper Sandusky		Upper Sandusky		Started 2008-09	Willard	Bellevue	Bellevue	Norwalk
2005-06	Columbian		Norwalk, Willard		Willard		Started 2008-09	Bellevue	Norwalk, Shelby	Galion	Columbian, Norwalk
2006-07	Columbian	Columbian			Upper Sandusky		Started 2008-09		Shelby	Shelby	Norwalk
2007-08	Columbian, Fostoria	Willard			Fostoria		Started 2008-09	Bellevue	Fostoria	Shelby	Bellevue
2008-09	Columbian, Fostoria	Willard			Columbian, Upper Sandusky		Columbian	Bellevue	Fostoria	Columbian	Willard
2009-10	Galion	Shelby	Columbian, Shelby	Columbian	Bellevue, Columbian, Shelby		Galion	Norwalk	Bellevue, Columbian, Norwalk	Shelby	Norwalk
2010-11	Columbian	Columbian	Upper Sandusky		Norwalk, Shelby		Galion	Norwalk	Norwalk	Shelby	Norwalk
2011-12	Sandusky	Norwalk	Willard		Norwalk		Sandusky	Norwalk	Columbian, Bellevue, Norwalk	Bellevue	Norwalk
2012-13	Columbian	Norwalk	Willard		Norwalk		Sandusky	Sandusky	Norwalk	Norwalk	Norwalk
2013-14	Columbian	Columbian	Bellevue	Columbian	Norwalk, Ontario		Ontario	Sandusky	Ontario	Norwalk	Shelby
2014-15	Norwalk	Willard	Bellevue	Norwalk	Ontario	Willard	Ontario	Bellevue, Sandusky	Bellevue	Sandusky	Shelby
2015-16	Bellevue	Norwalk	Norwalk	Ontario	Ontario, Sandusky	Columbian	Shelby	Bellevue	Shelby	Shelby	Norwalk
2016-17	Sandusky	Norwalk	Norwalk	Ontario	Sandusky	Sandusky	Sandusky	Sandusky	Shelby	Bellevue	Norwalk
Year	Football	Cross Country	Golf	Soccer	Basketball	Bowling	Swimming	Wrestling	Baseball	Track & Field	Tennis

=== Girls Championships ===
All league champions have been updated besides champions from Fostoria and Galion.

Year	Volleyball	Cross Country	Golf	Soccer	Tennis	Basketball	Bowling	Swimming	Softball	Track & Field
1974-75	Bellevue		Started 2013-14	Started 2015-16		Shelby, Upper Sandusky	Started 2014-15	Started 1999-00	Started 1977-78	Upper Sandusky
1975-76	Bellevue		Started 2013-14	Started 2015-16	Shelby	Bellevue	Started 2014-15	Started 1999-00	Started 1977-78	
1976-77	Willard		Started 2013-14	Started 2015-16	Bellevue	Shelby	Started 2014-15	Started 1999-00	Started 1977-78	
1977-78	Bellevue		Started 2013-14	Started 2015-16	Bellevue	Upper Sandusky	Started 2014-15	Started 1999-00	Shelby	Willard
1978-79	Columbian		Started 2013-14	Started 2015-16	Columbian	Columbian	Started 2014-15	Started 1999-00	Shelby	
1979-80	Columbian		Started 2013-14	Started 2015-16	Shelby	Columbian	Started 2014-15	Started 1999-00	Shelby	Bellevue
1980-81	Upper Sandusky	Bellevue	Started 2013-14	Started 2015-16	Shelby	Upper Sandusky	Started 2014-15	Started 1999-00	Galion	Bellevue
1981-82	Norwalk		Started 2013-14	Started 2015-16		Upper Sandusky	Started 2014-15	Started 1999-00	Galion	Bellevue
1982-83	Bellevue, Norwalk, Willard	Columbian	Started 2013-14	Started 2015-16	Bellevue	Shelby	Started 2014-15	Started 1999-00	Shelby	Columbian
1983-84	Bellevue, Norwalk	Columbian	Started 2013-14	Started 2015-16	Bellevue	Bellevue	Started 2014-15	Started 1999-00	Shelby	
1984-85	Bellevue	Columbian, Norwalk	Started 2013-14	Started 2015-16	Bucyrus	Upper Sandusky	Started 2014-15	Started 1999-00	Galion	Willard
1985-86	Columbian	Bellevue	Started 2013-14	Started 2015-16	Columbian	Shelby	Started 2014-15	Started 1999-00	Willard	Bellevue
1986-87	Norwalk	Bellevue	Started 2013-14	Started 2015-16	Columbian	Galion	Started 2014-15	Started 1999-00	Bellevue	Bellevue
1987-88	Shelby	Bellevue	Started 2013-14	Started 2015-16	Columbian	Shelby	Started 2014-15	Started 1999-00	Bellevue, Bucyrus	Bellevue
1988-89	Bellevue, Shelby	Columbian	Started 2013-14	Started 2015-16	Columbian	Shelby, Upper Sandusky	Started 2014-15	Started 1999-00	Bellevue, Bucyrus	Columbian
1989-90	Bellevue	Columbian	Started 2013-14	Started 2015-16	Bucyrus, Columbian	Willard	Started 2014-15	Started 1999-00	Bucyrus, Shelby	Columbian
1990-91	Columbian, Shelby	Columbian	Started 2013-14	Started 2015-16	Bucyrus	Willard	Started 2014-15	Started 1999-00	Bucyrus	Columbian
1991-92		Columbian	Started 2013-14	Started 2015-16	Shelby	Shelby	Started 2014-15	Started 1999-00	Shelby	Columbian
1992-93	Norwalk	Columbian	Started 2013-14	Started 2015-16	Columbian	Willard	Started 2014-15	Started 1999-00	Shelby	Columbian
1993-94	Norwalk	Columbian	Started 2013-14	Started 2015-16	Shelby	Willard	Started 2014-15	Started 1999-00	Bucyrus	Shelby
1994-95	Bellevue, Norwalk, Shelby	Columbian	Started 2013-14	Started 2015-16	Bucyrus	Columbian	Started 2014-15	Started 1999-00	Bellevue, Bucyrus	Willard
1995-96	Norwalk	Columbian	Started 2013-14	Started 2015-16	Bucyrus, Columbian	Upper Sandusky	Started 2014-15	Started 1999-00	Willard	Shelby
1996-97	Norwalk	Bellevue	Started 2013-14	Started 2015-16	Bellevue	Shelby	Started 2014-15	Started 1999-00	Willard	Bellevue
1997-98		Bucyrus	Started 2013-14	Started 2015-16	Norwalk	Shelby	Started 2014-15	Started 1999-00	Columbian, Willard	Upper Sandusky
1998-99		Columbian	Started 2013-14	Started 2015-16	Upper Sandusky	Shelby	Started 2014-15	Started 1999-00	Shelby	Upper Sandusky
1999-00	Columbian	Bellevue	Started 2013-14	Started 2015-16	Columbian	Columbian, Upper Sandusky, Willard	Started 2014-15	Galion	Bellevue	Upper Sandusky
2000-01		Columbian	Started 2013-14	Started 2015-16	Upper Sandusky	Willard	Started 2014-15	Galion	Columbian	Upper Sandusky
2001-02		Willard	Started 2013-14	Started 2015-16	Columbian	Willard	Started 2014-15	Galion	Willard	Columbian, Shelby
2002-03	Norwalk	Columbian	Started 2013-14	Started 2015-16		Bellevue	Started 2014-15	Galion	Bellevue	Shelby
2003-04	Bellevue	Shelby	Started 2013-14	Started 2015-16	Upper Sandusky	Upper Sandusky	Started 2014-15	Galion	Bellevue, Shelby	Shelby
2004-05	Bellevue, Norwalk	Columbian	Started 2013-14	Started 2015-16		Upper Sandusky	Started 2014-15		Bellevue	Shelby
2005-06	Bellevue	Upper Sandusky	Started 2013-14	Started 2015-16		Shelby	Started 2014-15	Galion	Bellevue	Bellevue
2006-07	Columbian	Bellevue	Started 2013-14	Started 2015-16	Shelby	Shelby	Started 2014-15	Galion	Bellevue	Shelby
2007-08	Norwalk		Started 2013-14	Started 2015-16	Shelby	Shelby	Started 2014-15	Shelby	Bellevue	Shelby
2008-09	Columbian	Columbian	Started 2013-14	Started 2015-16	Shelby	Columbian	Started 2014-15	Shelby	Bellevue	Columbian
2009-10	Columbian	Shelby	Started 2013-14	Started 2015-16	Norwalk	Columbian	Started 2014-15	Shelby	Willard	Shelby
2010-11	Norwalk	Shelby	Started 2013-14	Started 2015-16	Willard	Bellevue	Started 2014-15	Shelby	Shelby	Columbian
2011-12	Norwalk	Bellevue	Started 2013-14	Started 2015-16	Willard	Bellevue, Shelby	Started 2014-15	Sandusky	Bellevue	Columbian
2012-13	Norwalk	Bellevue	Started 2013-14	Started 2015-16	Columbian	Bellevue, Shelby	Started 2014-15	Sandusky	Bellevue	Bellevue
2013-14	Norwalk	Bellevue	Shelby	Started 2015-16	Norwalk	Bellevue	Started 2014-15	Sandusky	Bellevue	Bellevue
2014-15	Norwalk	Bellevue		Started 2015-16	Norwalk	Bellevue	Norwalk, Willard	Sandusky	Bellevue	Bellevue
2015-16	Norwalk	Bellevue	Bellevue	Ontario	Norwalk	Bellevue, Willard	Willard	Sandusky	Bellevue	Ontario
2016-17	Norwalk	Bellevue	Shelby	Ontario	Norwalk	Bellevue, Shelby	Willard	Sandusky	Bellevue	Ontario
Year	Volleyball	Cross Country	Golf	Soccer	Tennis	Basketball	Bowling	Swimming	Softball	Track & Field

== See also ==
- Ohio High School Athletic Conferences
