= National Register of Historic Places listings in Crawford County, Ohio =

Location of Crawford County in Ohio

This is a list of the National Register of Historic Places listings in Crawford County, Ohio.

This is intended to be a complete list of the properties and districts on the National Register of Historic Places in Crawford County, Ohio, United States. The locations of National Register properties and districts for which the latitude and longitude coordinates are included below, may be seen in a Google map.

There are 26 properties and districts listed on the National Register in the county. Another property was once listed but has been removed.

This National Park Service list is complete through NPS recent listings posted May 1, 2026.

== Current listings ==
	Name on the Register	Image	Date listed	Location	City or town	Description
1	Judge Thomas Beer House	Judge Thomas Beer House	March 24, 1980 (#80002968)	306 W. Southern Ave. 40°47′51″N 82°58′40″W	Bucyrus	
2	Big Four Depot	Big Four Depot	July 7, 1975 (#75001350)	Southeastern corner of Church and Washington Sts. 40°44′04″N 82°47′02″W	Galion	
3	Herbert S. Blair House	Herbert S. Blair House	March 24, 1980 (#80002969)	212 S. Lane St. 40°48′25″N 82°58′19″W	Bucyrus	
4	Brownella Cottage and Grace Episcopal Church and Rectory	Brownella Cottage and Grace Episcopal Church and Rectory	September 27, 1980 (#80002975)	S. Union and Walnut Sts. 40°43′58″N 82°47′28″W	Galion	
5	Bucyrus Commercial Historic District	Bucyrus Commercial Historic District	February 28, 1985 (#85000401)	Sandusky Ave. and Mansfield St. 40°48′31″N 82°58′32″W	Bucyrus	
6	Bucyrus Mausoleum	Bucyrus Mausoleum	September 27, 1980 (#80002970)	Southern Ave. 40°47′49″N 82°59′08″W	Bucyrus	
7	Central Hotel, Hackedorn and Zimmerman Building	Central Hotel, Hackedorn and Zimmerman Building	November 13, 1976 (#76001386)	Southwestern corner of Harding Way E. and Market Sts. 40°44′01″N 82°47′24″W	Galion	
8	Dr. John Chesney House	Dr. John Chesney House	March 24, 1980 (#80002971)	225 E. Mansfield St. 40°48′30″N 82°58′21″W	Bucyrus	
9	Col. William Crawford Capture Site	Col. William Crawford Capture Site	April 3, 1979 (#79002812)	0.5 miles east of State Route 598 and County Road 229, east of Leesville; 40°47′51″N 82°46′56″W	Jefferson Township	
10	Crestline City Hall	Crestline City Hall	May 8, 1974 (#74001427)	121 W. Bucyrus St. 40°47′03″N 82°45′04″W	Crestline	Demolished in 1990
11	Stephen R. Harris House	Stephen R. Harris House	July 24, 1980 (#80002972)	548 East St. 40°48′12″N 82°58′14″W	Bucyrus	
12	Harvey One-Room School	Harvey One-Room School	March 17, 2010 (#10000083)	1120 Caldwell Rd., southwest of Bucyrus; 40°44′49″N 83°03′32″W	Bucyrus Township	
13	Heckler Farmhouse	Heckler Farmhouse	May 3, 1976 (#76001385)	North of downtown Crestline off State Route 61 on Oldfield Rd. 40°47′55″N 82°44′16″W	Crestline	
14	Hoffman House	Hoffman House	November 29, 1978 (#78002030)	211 Thoman St. 40°47′08″N 82°44′17″W	Crestline	
15	Hosford House	Hosford House	April 30, 1976 (#76001387)	6288 Hosford Rd., southwest of Galion; 40°43′24″N 82°49′00″W	Polk Township	
16	Adam Howard House	Adam Howard House	March 30, 1978 (#78002032)	230 S. Boston St. 40°43′53″N 82°47′36″W	Galion	
17	J & M Trading Post	J & M Trading Post	April 3, 1979 (#79002811)	6867 Leesville Rd. in Leesville; 40°47′43″N 82°47′18″W	Jefferson Township	
18	J & M Trading Post - Annex	J & M Trading Post - Annex	April 3, 1979 (#79002809)	Leesville Rd. in Leesville; 40°47′43″N 82°47′17″W	Jefferson Township	
19	Leesville Town Hall	Leesville Town Hall	April 3, 1979 (#79002810)	State Route 598 and County Road 229 in Leesville; 40°47′44″N 82°47′18″W	Jefferson Township	
20	McGraw House	McGraw House	July 18, 1975 (#75001349)	116 S. Walnut St. 40°48′29″N 82°58′26″W	Bucyrus	
21	Methodist Episcopal Church	Methodist Episcopal Church	October 27, 1978 (#78002031)	Thoman and Union Sts. 40°47′08″N 82°44′18″W	Crestline	
22	Monnett Memorial M. E. Chapel	Monnett Memorial M. E. Chapel	December 29, 1986 (#86003494)	999 State Route 98, southwest of Bucyrus; 40°44′21″N 82°59′35″W	Bucyrus Township	
23	D. Picking and Company	D. Picking and Company	July 11, 1974 (#74001425)	119 S. Walnut St. 40°48′29″N 82°58′28″W	Bucyrus	
24	Scroggs House	Scroggs House	October 9, 1974 (#74001426)	202 S. Walnut St. 40°48′27″N 82°58′26″W	Bucyrus	
25	Smith Road Bridge	Smith Road Bridge	October 7, 1980 (#80002973)	Northwest of Bucyrus; 40°55′37″N 83°02′08″W	Lykens Township	
26	Toledo and Ohio Central Depot	Toledo and Ohio Central Depot	October 3, 1980 (#80002974)	700 E. Rensselaer St. 40°48′28″N 82°58′02″W	Bucyrus	

== Former listing ==
	Name on the Register	Image	Date listed	Date removed	Location	City or town	Description
1	Calvary Reformed Church		November 29, 1978 (#78002029)	February 20, 1980	Thoman and John Sts.	Crestline	

== See also ==
- List of National Historic Landmarks in Ohio
- Listings in neighboring counties: Huron, Marion, Morrow, Richland, Seneca, Wyandot
- National Register of Historic Places listings in Ohio
