= Crestline High School =

Crestline High And Elementary school

Location
- 435 Oldfield Road; Crestline, (Crawford County), Ohio 44827; United States
- 40°48′0″N 82°44′32″W

Information
- Type: Public, coeducational high school
- School district: Crestline Exempted Village School District
- Superintendent: Matthew Henderson
- Principal: Kevin Fourman
- Teaching staff: 12.00 (FTE)
- Grades: 6-12
- Student to teacher ratio: 23.75
- Colors: Blue and white
- Athletics conference: Mid-Buckeye Conference
- Team name: Bulldogs
- Website: Crestline High School website

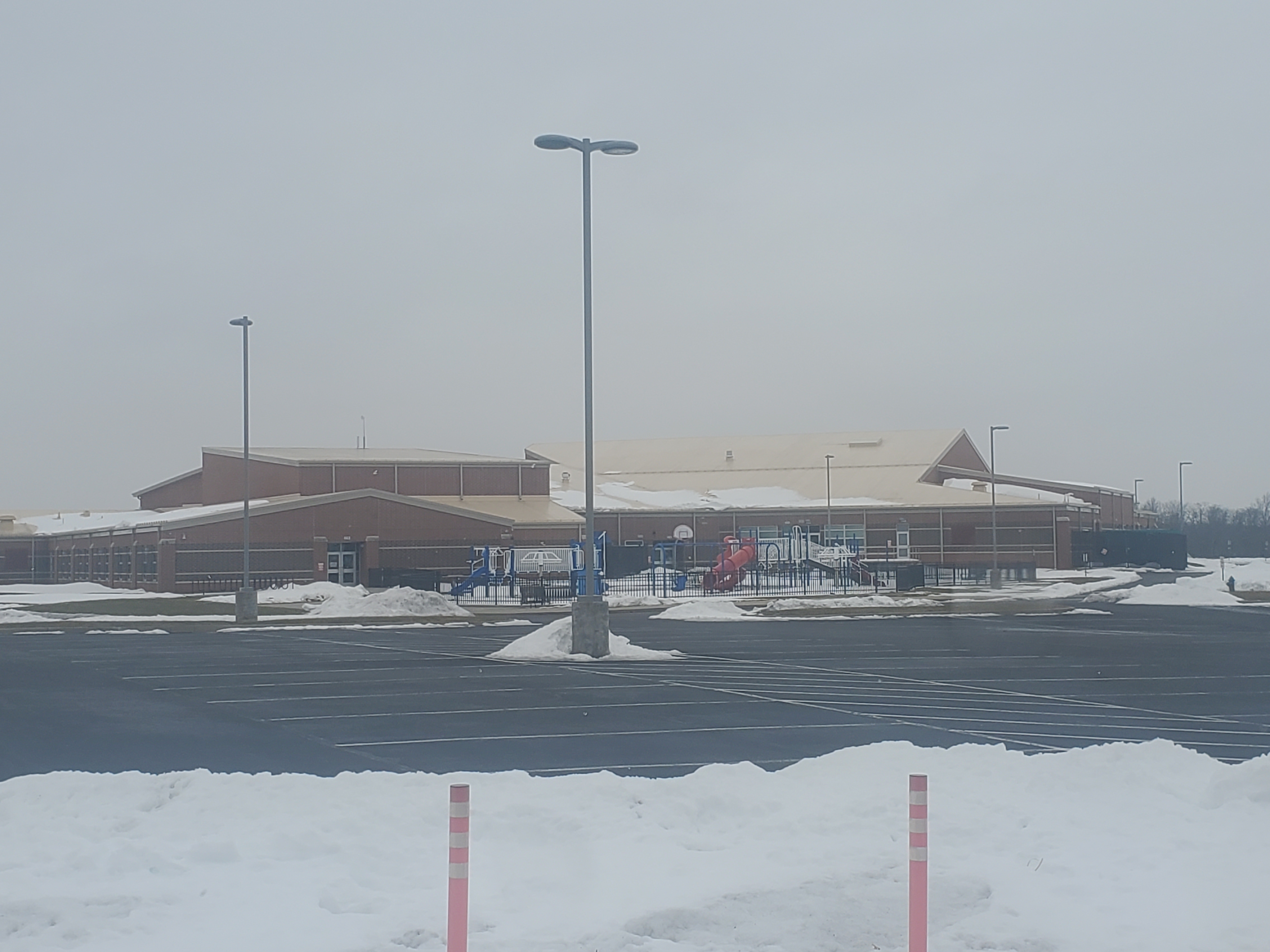
Crestline High School.jpg

Crestline High School is a public high school in Crestline, Ohio, United States. It is the only high school in the Crestline Exempted Village School District.

== Ohio High School Athletic Association State Championships ==
- Girls' softball – 2004

=== Athletic league affiliations ===
- League of Six Nations: 1933-1940
- Independent: 1940-1944
- Northern Ohio League: 1944-1954
- Independent: 1954-1961
- Johnny Appleseed Conference: 1961-1977
- Mid-Ohio Conference: 1977-1990
- North Central Conference: 1990-2014
- Northern 10 Athletic Conference: 2014-2015
- Mid-Buckeye Conference: 2015-
- Northwest Central Conference (football only):

2021-

== Notable alumni ==
- Gates Brown, former MLB player (Detroit Tigers)
- Jack Harbaugh, football coach and former player
