= Mid-Buckeye Conference =

The Mid-Buckeye Conference, known also at times as the Middle Buckeye Conference, is an OHSAA athletics conference with member schools located in Ashland, Crawford, Richland, and Wayne counties.

The following are the current members:

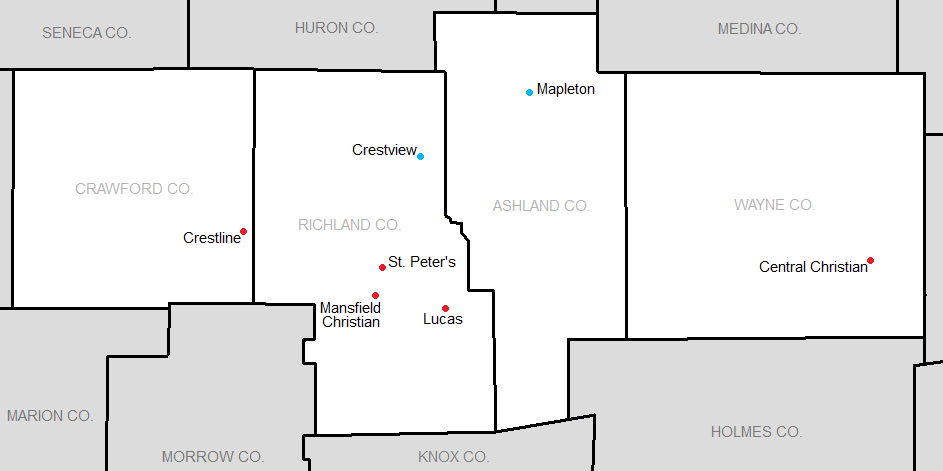
The membership of the Mid-Buckeye Conference beginning with the 2024-2025 school year. Full members are in red, affiliates for Girls Soccer are in blue.

School	Nickname	Location	Colors	Tenure
Full Members
Central Christian	Comets	Kidron	Blue, White	Spring 2015–present
Crestline	Bulldogs	Crestline	Blue, White	2015-
Mansfield Christian	Flames	Mansfield	Red, White	2013–present
St. Peter's	Spartans	Mansfield	Blue, White	2013–present
Affiliate Members
Crestview	Cougars	Ashland (Weller Township, Richland County)	Red, White, Black	2014- (Girls Soccer)
Mapleton	Mounties	Ashland (Orange Township)	Royal Blue, Red	2014- (Girls Soccer)

== Former members ==
- Ashley Aces (Charter member, 1948-1952)
- Cardington-Lincoln Pirates (Charter member, 1948-1954)
- Centerburg Trojans (Charter member, 1948-1962, 1963-1977, 1981-2013)
- Sunbury Eagles (Charter member, 1948-1949)
- Mount Gilead Indians (1949-1954)
- Richwood Tigers (1950-1952, 1953-1954)
- Sunbury Big Walnut Golden Eagles (Consolidation of Sunbury and Galena, 1950-1954)
- Ashley Elm Valley Aces (Consolidation of Ashley, 1952-1954)
- Granville Blue Aces (1954-1962)
- Summit Station Hornets (1954-1956)
- Pataskala Watkins Memorial Warriors (1955-1962)
- Summit Station Licking Heights Hornets (Consolidation of Summit Station, 1956-1962)
- Howard Bulldogs (First reformation charter member, 1963-1964)
- Mount Vernon St. Vincent de Paul Blue Streaks (First reformation charter member, 1963-1968/School closed)
- New Albany Eagles (1965-1972, 1984-1990)
- Gahanna Columbus Academy Vikings (1966-1977)
- Newark Catholic Green Wave (1966-1973)
- Lucas Cubs (1968-1979, Second reformation charter member, 1982-1999)
- Zanesville Bishop Rosecrans Bishops (1977-1979)
- Bowerston Conotton Valley Rockets (1978-1979)
- Mansfield Christian Flames (1982-1983/no football)
- Worthington Christian Warriors (1982-2004/no football)
- Fredericktown Freddies (1999-2013)
- Johnstown-Monroe Johnnies (1950-1962, 1994-2013)
- Northridge Vikings (1986-2013)
- Utica Redskins (1951-1958, 1960-1962, 1999-2013)
- Howard East Knox Bulldogs (1964-1979, 1981-2014)
- Danville Blue Devils (1954-1962, 1963-1979, 1981-2017)
- Loudonville Redbirds (2004-2016 (football & wrestling), 2004-2024 (all other sports))
- Lucas Cubs (1968–1979, Second reformation charter member 1981–1999, 2013-2026)

== League History ==
Originally formed in 1948, the league has had three separate incarnations. The original league lasted until 1962. The MBC reformed again in 1963 and lasted until 1979. The third and final reformation so far, took place in 1981 and that league has lasted to this day.

=== The league's future ===
The future of the MBC was threatened by more re-alignment in OHSAA conferences, as five of the league's former members submitted "intent to withdraw" letters to commissioner Wintermute in 2011. Johnstown-Monroe, Northridge, and Utica agreed to join the revamped Licking County League in 2013. Centerburg, Danville, East Knox, and Fredericktown expressed interest in joining the Mid-Ohio Athletic Conference, a league that was exploring expansion in May 2011. MOAC membership was initially only extended to Centerburg and Fredericktown, both of which agreed to join the league in 2013-14. East Knox was offered membership on February 23, 2012 and joined in 2014.

By 2014, the MBC had the possibility of being down to 2 members (Danville and Loudonville). However, applications for admission were submitted by Lucas, Mansfield Christian, and Mansfield St. Peter's to join in 2013-14, and were approved by the league shortly thereafter. The league will continue to look for additional members, although they will not support a football championship. Danville, East Knox, Loudonville, and Lucas began competing as football independents in 2013. Central Christian will join in the Spring of 2015 and Crestline will join in the Fall of 2015. As of the Fall of 2014, both Mapleton and Crestview compete in the MBC for girls soccer.

On April 18, 2015, Loudonville announced that they would remain within the Mid-Buckeye Conference for all sports except football, which will join the Principals Athletic Conference for the 2017-2018 school year.

In late 2015, Danville announced they would leave the MBC to help form the Knox Morrow Athletic Conference with seven schools from the Blue Division of the MOAC.

In March 2023, Loudonville's Board of Education approved leaving the MBC to join the Knox Morrow Athletic Conference (KMAC) as a full-fledged member beginning with the 2024-25 school year.

In February 2025, the Northern 10 Athletic Conference invited Lucas to join their conference starting with the 2026-27 school year. Lucas accepted the invitation on March 18, 2025.

== See also ==
- Ohio High School Athletic Conferences
