= Crestline Exempted Village School District =

School district in Ohio

Crestline Exempted Village School District is a public school district serving students in the city of Crestline and Jackson Township in Crawford County, Ohio, United States. Also the school district extends into neighboring Richland County in parts of Sandusky Township. The district enrolled 820 students during the 2007–2008 academic year. A new facility for students of all ages opened in December 2012.

== Schools ==
=== Elementary schools ===
Crestline Elementary School (Grades PK through 5th)

=== Middle and High Schools ===
- Crestline High School (Grades 6th through 12th)
