= St. Peter's High School (Mansfield, Ohio) =

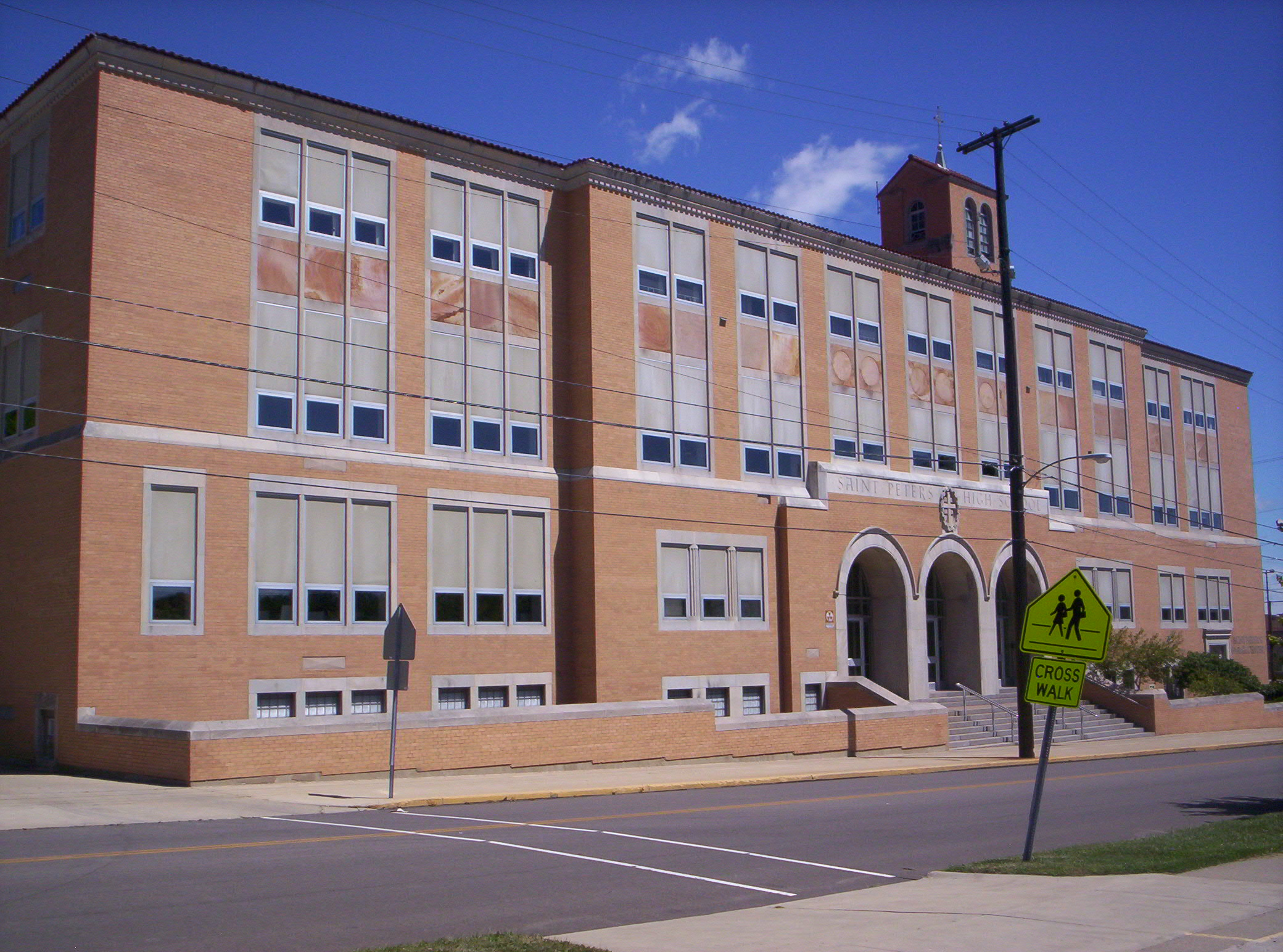

Location
- 104 West First Street; Mansfield, Richland County, Ohio 44902; United States; 40°45′24″N 82°31′10″W

Information
- Type: Private, Coeducational
- Religious affiliation: Christian
- Denomination: Roman Catholic
- Established: 1868
- Superintendent: Fr. John Miller
- Principal: John Cuttita
- Faculty: 27
- Grades: 9–12
- Enrollment: 217 (2016-2017)
- Student to teacher ratio: 9:1
- Campus type: Urban
- Colors: Blue and White
- Athletics conference: Mid-Buckeye Conference
- Sports: basketball, soccer, softball, baseball, tennis, volleyball, track, cheerleading, cross country, swimming
- Mascot: Spartan warrior
- Nickname: Sparty
- Team name: Spartans
- Rival: Mansfield Christian Flames
- Accreditation: Ohio Catholic Schools Accrediting Association
- Newspaper: The Key
- Website: www.mansfieldstpeters.org

Mansfield St. Peter's High School is a private, Catholic, co-educational secondary school located in Mansfield, Ohio, United States. It is part of the Roman Catholic Diocese of Toledo.

== Ohio High School Athletic Association state championships ==
- Boys Basketball – 1968, 1978
- Girls Basketball – 1980

The St. Peter's Spartans compete in the Mid-Buckeye Conference, since the 2013–2014 school year started.

== Notable alumni ==
- Richard "Rick" Nesta, 1966. One of the guitar players for The Music Explosion.
