= Lucas High School (Ohio) =

Location
- 5 First Avenue; Lucas, Ohio 44843; United States
- 40°42′18″N 82°25′04″W

Information
- Type: Public
- School district: Lucas Local School District
- Superintendent: Brad Herman
- Principal: Jim Metcalf
- Faculty: 15.00 ((on an FTE basis))
- Grades: 8–12
- Enrollment: 151 (2023–2024)
- Student to teacher ratio: 10.07
- Colors: Orange & Black
- Athletics conference: Northern 10 Athletic Conference
- Mascot: Cub
- Website: www.lucascubs.org/lucashighschool_home.aspx

Lucas High School is located in Lucas, Ohio, United States and is part of the Lucas Local School District.

== Mission statement ==
"We are here to prepare students to achieve and succeed."

== Athletics ==
- Football
- Baseball
- Basketball
- Volleyball
- Softball
- Cross Country
- Cheerleading
- Track and Field
- Wrestling

The Lucas football team has participated in the 2000, 2006, 2014, 2015, 2016, 2017, 2018, 2019, 2020 and 2021 state playoffs. In 2019, the football team played in the D7 state championship on December 7, 2019, at the Tom Benson Stadium and lost to Marion Local by a score of 28–6. In 1991, the Lucas baseball team reached the state semi-finals. In 2005, Angela Foss won the schools only individual state championship. She took first place at the state meet in the pole vault. In 2017, the girls softball team reached the state semi-finals.

League Affiliation

- Richland County League: 19??–1963
- Johnny Appleseed Conference: 1963–1967
- Independent: 1967–1968
- Mid-Buckeye Conference: 1968–1979
- Black Fork Valley Conference: 1979–1981
- Mid-Buckeye Conference: 1981–1998
- North Central Conference: 1998–2013
- Mid-Buckeye Conference: 2013–2026 (football was independent of a league)
- Northern 10 Athletic Conference: 2026-

== Clubs ==
- Leo Club
- FCCLA
- CACY
- National Honor Society
- Spanish Club
- Academic Challenge
- FFA
- Big Brothers, Big Sisters
- Ski Club
- Band

== Report card ==
During the 2010–2011 academic year, Lucas High School received a high percentage rate of tenth grade students who passed the Ohio Graduation Test. These percentages are above or at the proficient level:

- Reading 100%
- Mathematics 100%
- Writing 100%
- Science 96.9%
- Social Studies 100%

The state of Ohio recognized the Lucas Local school district's designation as excellent.

== Notable faculty ==
- Tim Seder - Football player for the Dallas Cowboys and the Jacksonville Jaguars. He also taught health and physical education at Lucas High School; and coached the football, baseball, and basketball teams.
