= Lucas, Ohio =

- Village
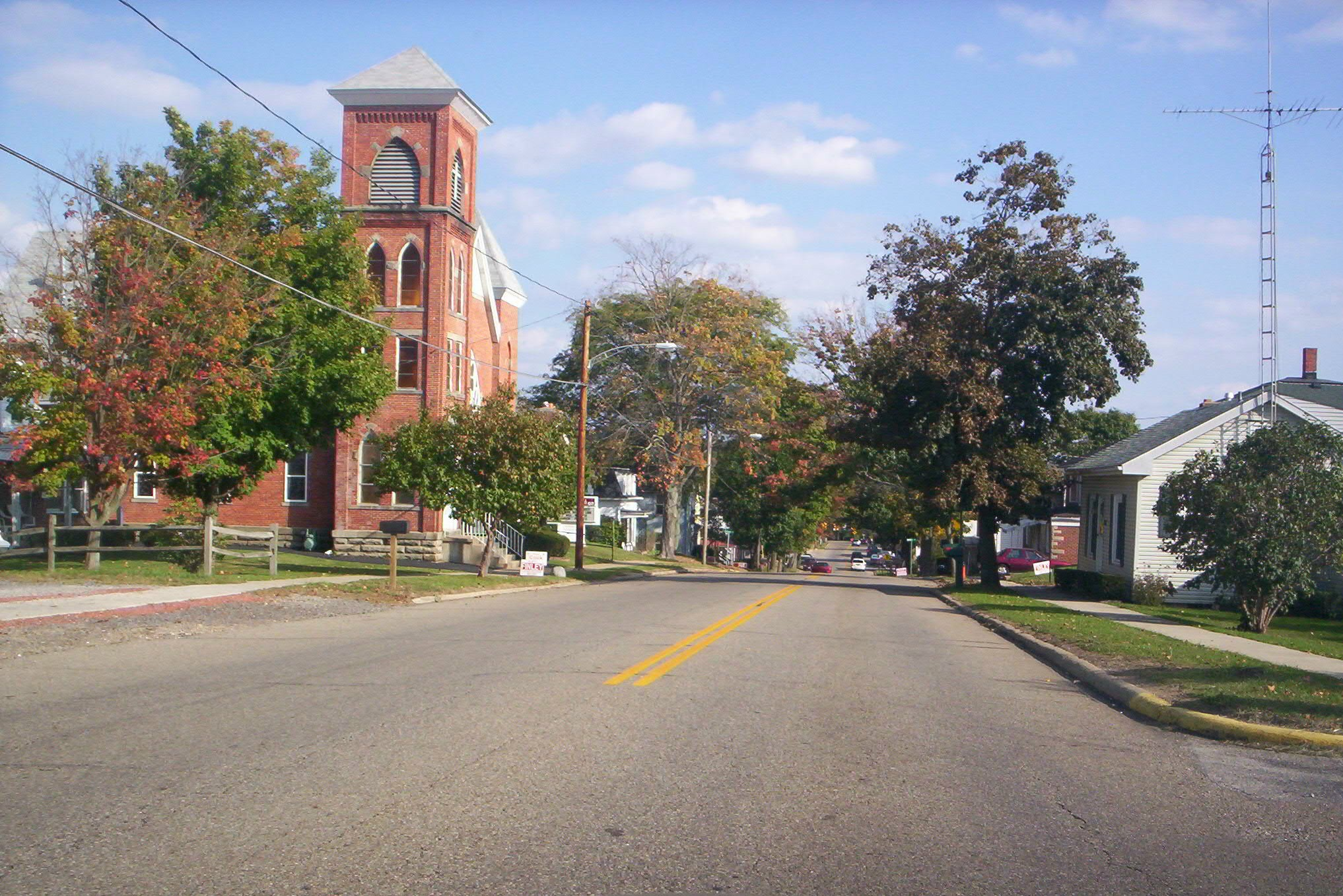
- West Main Street in 2007

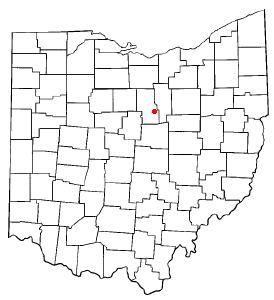
- Location of Lucas, Ohio

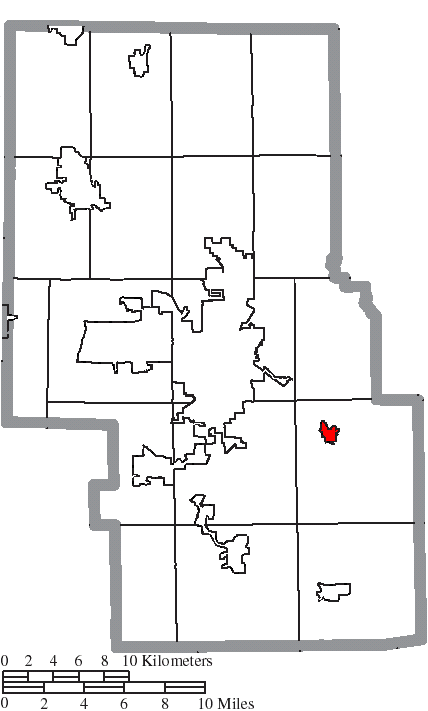
- Location of Lucas in Richland County
- Coordinates: 40°42′15″N 82°25′20″W
- Country: United States
- State: Ohio
- County: Richland

Government
  - Mayor: Todd R. Hall

Area
  - Total: 0.68 sq mi (1.76 km^{2})
  - Land: 0.68 sq mi (1.75 km^{2})
  - Water: 0 sq mi (0.00 km^{2})
- Elevation: 1,132 ft (345 m)

Population (2020)
  - Total: 589
  - Density: 869.7/sq mi (335.81/km^{2})
- Time zone: UTC-5 (Eastern (EST))
  - Summer (DST): UTC-4 (EDT)
- ZIP code: 44843
- Area code: 419
- FIPS code: 39-45276
- GNIS feature ID: 2399197

Lucas is a village in southeastern Richland County, Ohio, United States. Lucas is part of the Mansfield, Ohio Metropolitan Statistical Area. The population was 589 at the 2020 census.

== History ==
David Tucker, a New Hampshire resident, moved to Richland County in 1819, where he set in a proposal to buy land in the rural country of the county. He was granted this proposal in 1824, allowing him to buy land from the state at $1.25 per acre. After purchasing a mass quantity of land from the state, Tucker hired Mr. Steward to survey the land for auctioning out. David's brother, John, was placed in charge as the head attorney authored to sell land to incoming settlers and pioneers in 1829. The auction was advertised in the local handbill "The Mansfield Shield and Banner", in which the land was described as "as good as a wheat growing country as the state can have." In response to this statement, the land for three major wheat mills was bought that year and mills were built in the following months. The town officially built and commissioned a postal office later that year. In 1830, the Chicago Railroad Company paid for tracks to be laid down on the south side of town of the town as well as a depot. By 1834, the Lucas area was full of houses and shops, becoming a major rural center for Richland County, mostly due to being the first town in the county to receive federal aid in its building because the land where Lucas presided was a campsite of General John Brooks as he marched north from Mansfield during the War of 1812, thus qualifying it as a historical site at the time. Currently three theories exist on how the Village of Lucas acquired its name:

1. The town was named after the current at the time and 12th governor of Ohio, Robert Lucas.
2. The town was named in honor of Governor Lucas's brother, a major land owner for the town.
3. The town was named in honor of the Tucker brothers' mother's maiden name, Lucas.

However the name came to be, the town of Lucas was officially established according to Ohio standards at the time in 1836.

== Geography ==
Lucas lies southeast of Mansfield, a few miles from Interstate 71 on State Route 39. Lucas is surrounded by the Rocky Fork and Black Fork rivers, and the Charles Mill Lake to the east, and the Pleasant Hill Lake to the south. Lucas has many hills and forests and is part of the Mohican Valley area, along with Loudonville, Perrysville, Butler and Bellville. According to the United States Census Bureau, the village has a total area of 0.69 square miles (1.79 km^{2}), all land.

== Demographics ==
Historical population
Census	Pop.	Note	%±
1870	312		—
1880	381		22.1%
1890	347		−8.9%
1900	306		−11.8%
1910	272		−11.1%
1920	337		23.9%
1930	369		9.5%
1940	484		31.2%
1950	573		18.4%
1960	719		25.5%
1970	771		7.2%
1980	753		−2.3%
1990	730		−3.1%
2000	620		−15.1%
2010	615		−0.8%
2020	589		−4.2%

=== 2010 census ===
As of the census of 2010, there were 615 people, 237 households, and 176 families residing in the village. The population density was 891.3 inhabitants per square mile (344.1/km^{2}). There were 269 housing units at an average density of 389.9 per square mile (150.5/km^{2}). The racial makeup of the village was 98.0% White, 0.3% African American, and 1.6% from two or more races.

There were 237 households, of which 42.2% had children under the age of 18 living with them, 50.2% were married couples living together, 16.9% had a female householder with no husband present, 7.2% had a male householder with no wife present, and 25.7% were non-families. 21.5% of all households were made up of individuals, and 8.4% had someone living alone who was 65 years of age or older. The average household size was 2.59 and the average family size was 2.97.

The median age in the village was 34.9 years. 29.1% of residents were under the age of 18; 9.4% were between the ages of 18 and 24; 27.8% were from 25 to 44; 21.9% were from 45 to 64; and 11.7% were 65 years of age or older. The gender makeup of the village was 49.1% male and 50.9% female.

=== 2000 census ===
As of the census of 2000, there were 620 people, 246 households, and 172 families residing in the village. The population density was 1,037.1 inhabitants per square mile (400.4/km^{2}). There were 268 housing units at an average density of 448.3 per square mile (173.1/km^{2}). The racial makeup of the village was 97.42% White, 0.81% African American, 0.48% Native American, 0.16% from other races, and 1.13% from two or more races. Hispanic or Latino of any race were 0.16% of the population.

There were 246 households, out of which 33.7% had children under the age of 18 living with them, 53.7% were married couples living together, 12.2% had a female householder with no husband present, and 29.7% were non-families. 24.4% of all households were made up of individuals, and 11.4% had someone living alone who was 65 years of age or older. The average household size was 2.52 and the average family size was 3.01.

In the village, the population was spread out, with 27.6% under the age of 18, 7.4% from 18 to 24, 31.3% from 25 to 44, 20.3% from 45 to 64, and 13.4% who were 65 years of age or older. The median age was 36 years. For every 100 females there were 96.2 males. For every 100 females age 18 and over, there were 87.1 males.

The median income for a household in the village was $37,813, and the median income for a family was $42,917. Males had a median income of $36,094 versus $20,625 for females. The per capita income for the village was $17,653. About 2.7% of families and 6.2% of the population were below the poverty line, including 3.3% of those under age 18 and 7.8% of those age 65 or over.

== Education and athletics ==
Lucas is in the Lucas Local School District. The district enrolls 584 students and administers 3 public schools including Lucas Elementary School, Lucas Heritage Middle School, and Lucas High School.

The Lucas "Cubs" are a member of the Mid-Buckeye Conference, participating in sports such as baseball, football, basketball, track, cross country, girls volleyball and girls softball.

Lucas has a public library, a branch of the Mansfield–Richland County Public Library.

== Notable people ==
- Louis Bromfield, Pulitzer Prize–winning author and world-famous conservationist
- John Chapman, also known as Johnny Appleseed, American pioneer nurseryman
- Tim Seder, Dallas Cowboys and Jacksonville Jaguars placekicker
