= Marc Wilkins (baseball) =

American baseball player (born 1970)

- Pitcher
- Born: October 21, 1970 (age 55); Mansfield, Ohio, U.S.
- Batted: Right Threw: Right

MLB debut
- May 11, 1996, for the Pittsburgh Pirates

Last MLB appearance
- August 29, 2001, for the Pittsburgh Pirates

MLB statistics
- Win–loss record: 19–14
- Earned run average: 4.28
- Strikeouts: 218
- Stats at Baseball Reference

Teams
- Pittsburgh Pirates (1996–2001)

Marc Allen Wilkins (born October 21, 1970) is an American former professional baseball pitcher. He played in Major League Baseball (MLB) for the Pittsburgh Pirates from 1996 to 2001. Wilkins attended high school at Ontario High School in Ontario, Ohio and college at the University of Toledo.
