= Galion High School =

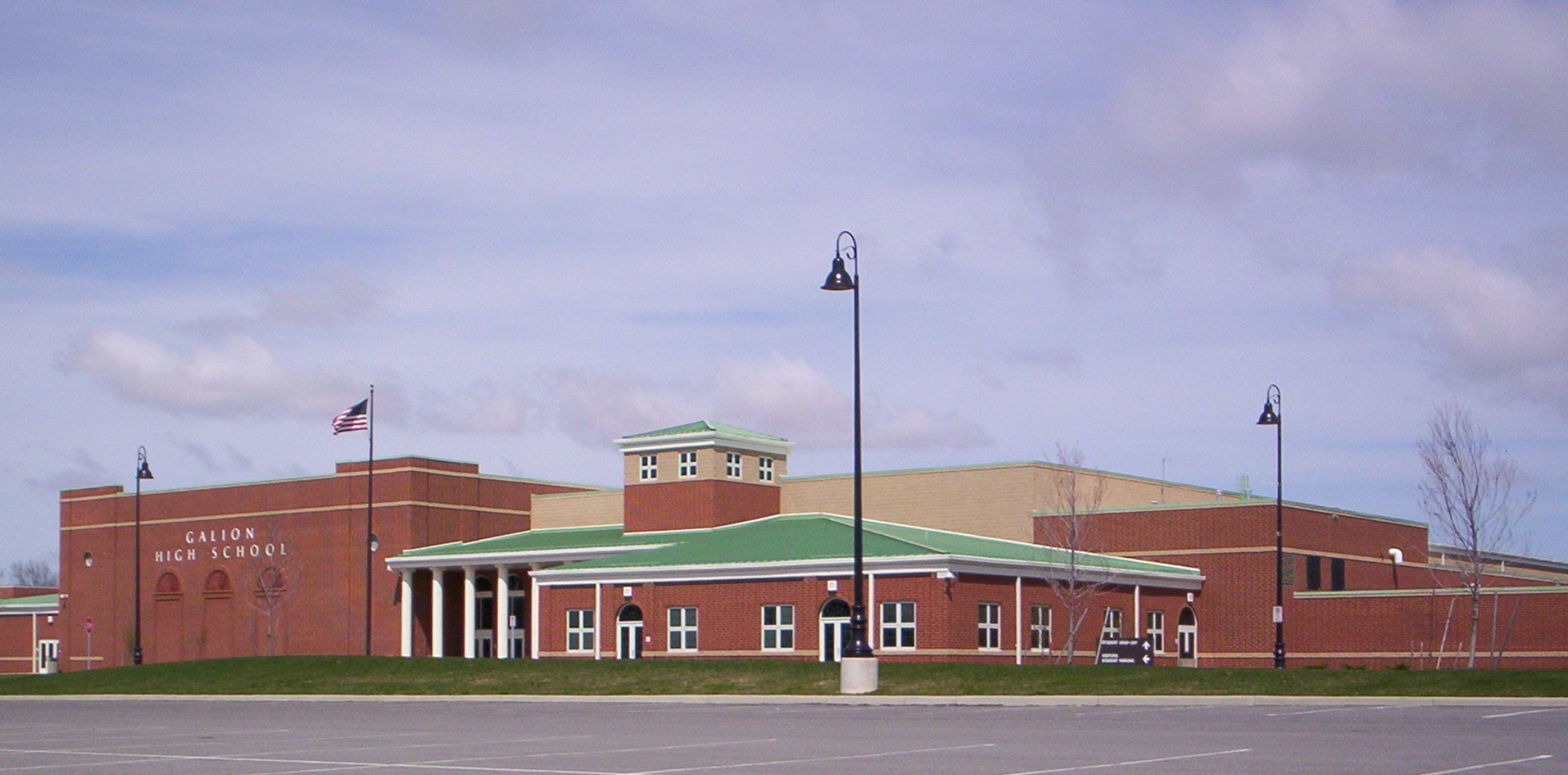

Location
- 472 Portland Way North; Galion, Ohio 44833; United States
- 40°44′24″N 82°48′19″W

Information
- Type: Public, Coeducational high school
- School district: Galion City School District
- Principal: Don Vogt
- Staff: 21.74 (FTE)
- Grades: 9–12
- Student to teacher ratio: 18.54
- Colors: Orange and blue
- Athletics conference: Mid-Ohio Athletic Conference (MOAC)
- Team name: Tigers
- Website: highschool.galionschools.org

Galion High School is a public high school located in Galion, Ohio, United States. It serves students ranging from grades 9 through 12. The school colors are blue and orange and its athletic teams are known as the Tigers. The current high school building opened in 2007 following the demolition of the previous home of Galion High School on North Union Street.

== Facilities ==
This building is located on Portland Way North on a campus with the district's other schools. It opened in 2007 along with a new middle school to replace the aging building that was on North Union Street.

== History ==
The first Galion Union High School was built in 1868 on West Walnut Street and served as Galion High School until 1917. This building was demolished in 1924 and a new junior high school was built on the site in 1925, which was razed in April 2008. The second home of GHS was built in 1917 on the site of a former cemetery on North Union Street. This building was extended in 1962, adding features such as a large gymnasium. This building was in use until the end of the 2006–2007 school year, with the new Galion High School opening in late 2007.

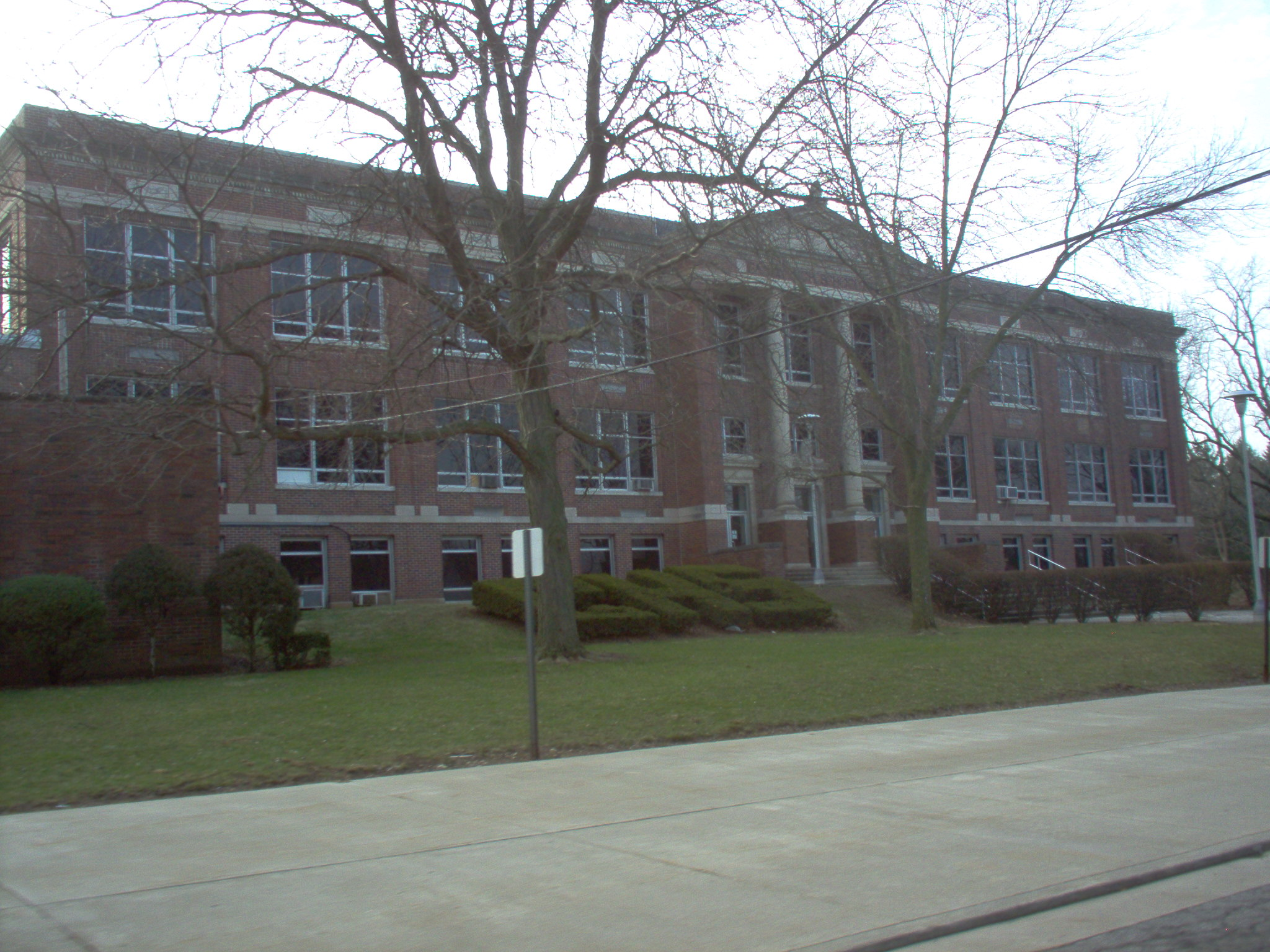
The second Galion High School built in 1917, demolished in 2008

== State championships ==
- Football – 1985
- Boys' track and field – 1921
- Girls' volleyball – 1999, 2000

=== Athletic league affiliations ===
- North Central Ohio League: 1919–1945
- Northern Ohio League: 1944–2011
- North Central Conference: 2011–2014
- Mid-Ohio Athletic Conference: 2014–present

== Notable alumni ==
- J. B. Shuck, professional baseball player in Major League Baseball
- Nate Reinking, professional basketball player for the British Basketball League and the Great Britain men's national basketball team; head coach in the NBA G League
