= Augusta W. Urquhart =

Augusta W. Urquhart

Augusta W. Urquhart (née Wynkoop; often referred to in print after marriage as Mrs. John C. Urquhart; 1870–1960) was an American social leader and clubwoman, interested in civic and international affairs. She served as president of the California State Woman's Christian Temperance Union (WCTU) and president of the Western States Federation of Women's Clubs.

== Biography ==
Augusta Wynkoop was born in Crestline, Ohio in 1870. Her parents were Henry W. and Mary C. Wynkoop.

She lived in California since 1913. Her husband was Dr. John C. Urquhart.

Associated with the General Federation of Women's Clubs, Urquhart was President of the Western States Federation of Women's Clubs, 1927–28. Previously, she served as California State president, Federation of Women's Clubs, 1923–25, and as president, Los Angeles District Federation of Women's Clubs, 1921–23. While serving as president of the State Federation, Urquhart led a major fundraising campaign for the State Federation's 90 acres (36 ha) redwood grove at North Dyerville Flat, California.

Urquhart was the first president of the California State WCTU. She later served as the National WCTU's director in the department of motion pictures.

She was president, Santa Monica Bay Woman's Club; chair, Americanization for Los Angeles District Federation of Women's Clubs; and organizer and chair, Women's Law Enforcement Committee of Southern California. In addition, she was a member of the Friday Morning Club and the Woman's Athletic Club. A member of the Los Angeles League of Women Voters, she served as the league's chair of International Co-Operation to Prevent War.

Augusta Urquhart died in Pasadena, California, on January 13, 1960. Interment was at Hollywood Cemetery.
