= Lucas Local School District =

School district in Ohio

Lucas Local School District is a public school district serving students in the village of Lucas, most of Monroe Township, eastern parts of Washington Township, and southern parts of Mifflin Township in Richland County, Ohio, United States. The school district enrolls 584 students as of the 2007–2008 academic year.

== Schools ==
=== Elementary schools ===
- Lucas Elementary School (Grades K through 5th)
- 425 students

=== Middle schools ===
- Lucas Heritage Middle School (Grades 6th and 7th)

=== High schools ===
- Lucas High School (Grades 8th through 12th)
