= Central Christian High School (Kidron, Ohio) =

Central Christian School
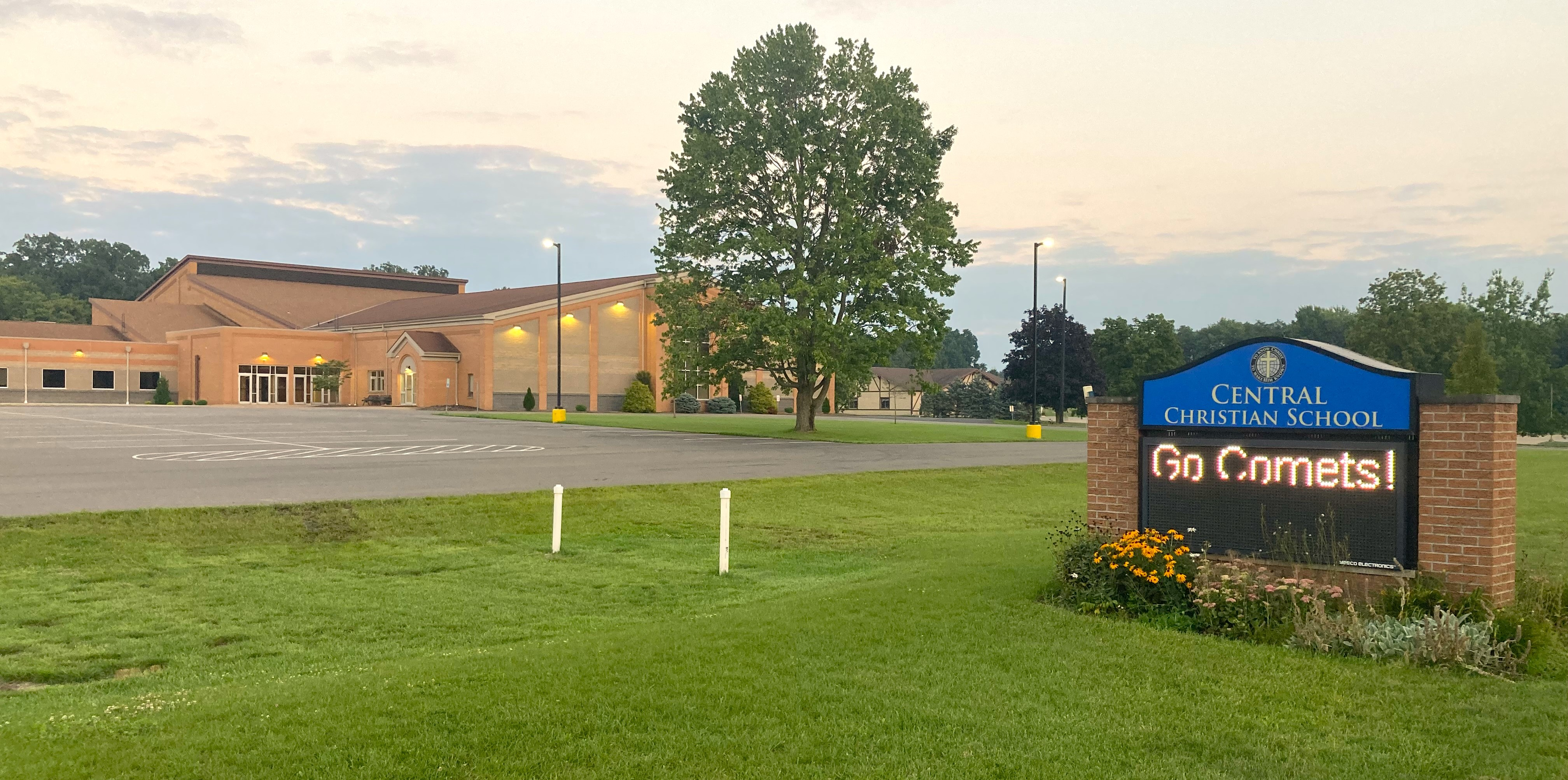

Location
- 3970 Kidron Road; Kidron, Ohio 44636; United States; 40.751°N 81.743°W

Information
- Type: Private, Co-Ed
- Motto: To know Christ and to make Him known
- Religious affiliation: Mennonite Church USA
- Established: 1961
- Superintendent: Nate Holton
- Principal: Craig Martin
- Grades: [Kindergarten]-12
- Average class size: 30
- Hours in school day: 7
- Colors: Blue & White
- Athletics conference: Mid-Buckeye Conference
- Nickname: Comets
- Website: http://www.ccscomets.org

Central Christian School is a private Mennonite Christian school in Kidron, Ohio. It is a coed school, and they serve 330 students in grades Kindergarten through 12.

== History ==
Central Christian was founded in 1961 and is owned and operated by the Ohio Conference of the Mennonite Church. It is the first Mennonite high school in Ohio. Their mascot is a Comet, although they were known as the Crusaders until June 2000. The school is also a member of both the OHSAA and the OCSAA.

A longtime independent, Central Christian joined the Mid-Buckeye Conference in the Spring of 2015.
