= Ontario Local Schools =

School district in Ohio

Address
- 457 Shelby-Ontario Road Mansfield, Ohio, 44906; United States

District information
- Type: Public
- Grades: PK–12
- Superintendent: Keith Strickler
- Schools: 3
- Budget: Revenue: (2018–19); US$20.4 million; Expenses: (2018–19); US$21.1 million

Students and staff
- Students: 1,948 (2021–22)
- Teachers: 92.98 (FTE) (2021–22)
- Staff: 136.41 (FTE) (2021–22)
- Student–teacher ratio: 20.95 (2021–22)

Other information
- Website: ontarioschools.org

Ontario Local Schools is a public school district serving students in the city of Ontario, most of Springfield Township, and southern parts of Sandusky Township in Richland County, Ohio (U.S.).

== Schools ==
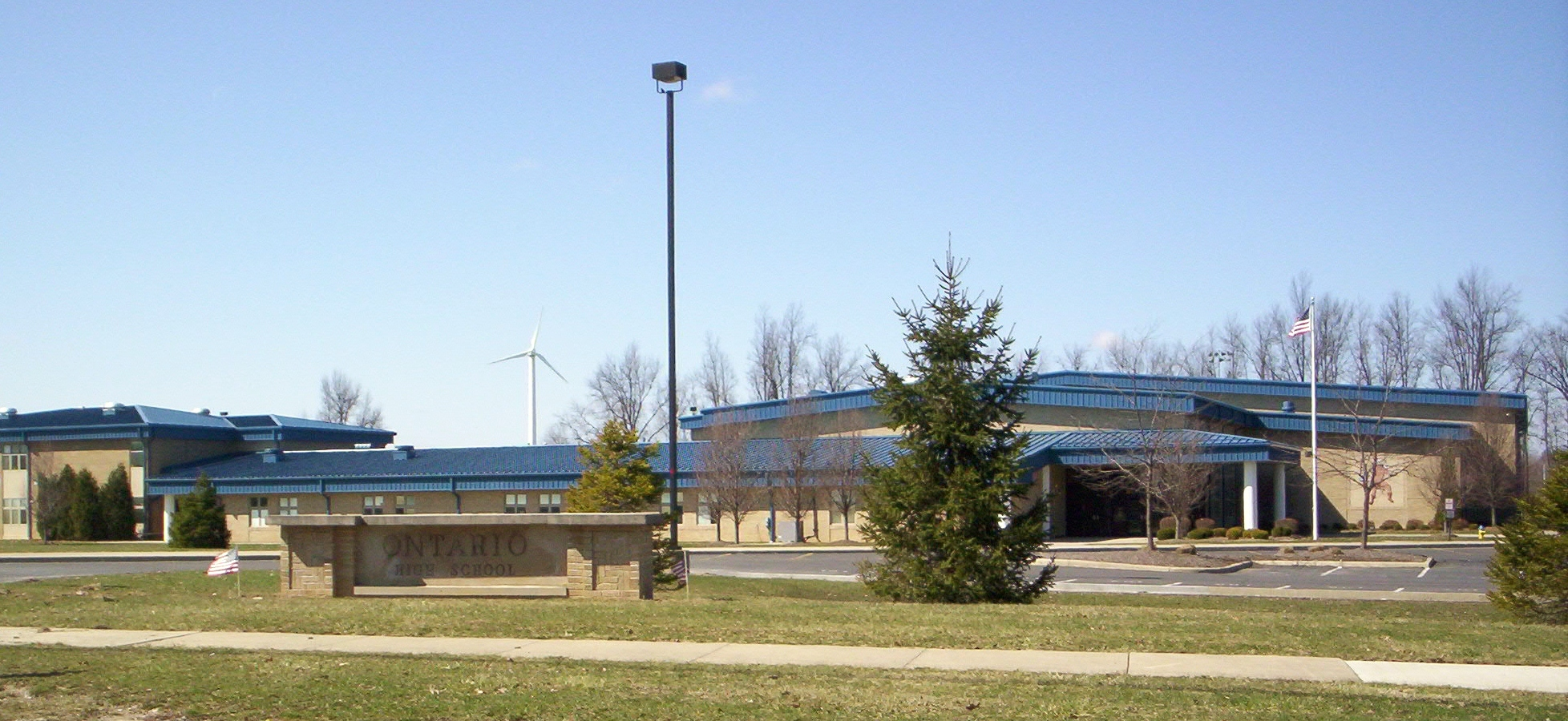
Ontario High School

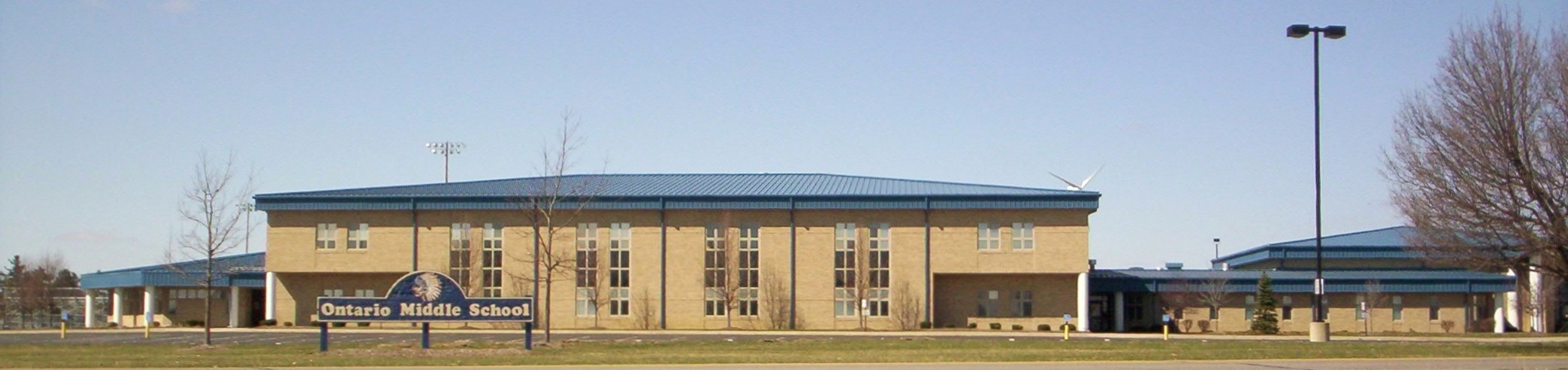
Ontario Middle School

Elementary schools

- Stingel Elementary School (K–5)

Middle schools

- Ontario Middle School (6–8)

High schools

- Ontario High School (9–12)

Former schools

- Bedford School – (now the Ontario Free United Methodist Church is located at the old Bedford School site)
- Springfield Township School – built in 1928–1929, was the Ontario Junior High School before it closed for good. On April 24, 2003, the old school was listed on the National Register of Historic Places. In 2007, the old school was demolished to make way for the new Park Meadows Senior Apartments.
