= Mansfield Christian School =

Mansfield Christian Schools

Location
- 500 Logan Road; Mansfield, Ohio 448209321; 40.721667°N 82.530278°W

Information
- Type: Private
- Grades: K-12
- Colors: Red & White
- Athletics conference: Mid-Buckeye Conference
- Mascot: Flames
- Information: (419) 756-5651
- Website: http://mcsflames.org/

Mansfield Christian School is a private K-12 Christian school in Mansfield, Ohio, United States.

== History ==
In the fall of 1961 Mansfield Christian School began in the lower level of Marion Avenue Grace Brethren Church. The school started with thirty-five students and three faculty members. For a little over two years, the school operated at this location. These first parents and staff members held to the conviction that parents have been given the responsibility by God to teach and train their children. They also held to the principle that education should result from a Biblical philosophy and the next generation should be taught a Christian worldview.

In the fall of 1963 the school was moved to the current facilities located on Logan Road. A gift of 40 acres (160,000 m^{2}) allowed the school to build its first building. In subsequent years, the school experienced four building expansions that included additional classrooms, a gymnasium, athletic fields, and a student-run radio station, WVMC-FM. By 1972 the first graduating class with nineteen students received their diplomas.

View of Mansfield Christian School from Logan Road.

== Academics ==
Mansfield Christian School offers programs for daycare, early education, elementary, middle school, and high school students. The school also offers College Credit Plus courses, honors courses, STEM programming, independent studies, and career-focused programs in health professions, ministry and missions, and STEM.

== Athletics ==
The Mansfield Christian Flames are members of the Mid-Buckeye Conference, beginning in 2013. Mansfield Christian School students excel not only in the classroom but also in athletics. Christ is always at the heart of our efforts, achieving glory in service to a Christian purpose. Our students perform in high-level competitions in accordance with Christian morality.

As Mid-Buckeye Conference Champions in Boys Basketball, Boys and Girls Soccer, our combined total of 12 varsity teams of boys and girls achieve success as they demonstrate the grace of Christian-focused sportsmanship. Since joining the Ohio High School Athletic Association (OHSAA) in the 1970s, our well-rounded sports program has grown so well that today, 80% of secondary students in 7th–12th grade participate in some way. Earning multiple OHSAA scholar-athlete awards, ranking 26 All-Ohio athletes, and not only delivering state qualifiers in track and cross country but winning the 2014 Boys Soccer State Champions, the Flames garner consistent recognition for their hard work. From district to regional and state competitions, the Flames have been champions in sports and as representatives of Christ.

The Flames compete in the following sports:

Fall Sports	Winter Sports	Spring Sports
Boys Cross Country; Girls Cross Country; Boys Soccer; Girls Soccer; Volleyball	Cheerleaders; Boys Basketball; Girls Basketball; Swimming	Boys Track; Girls Track; Girls Softball; Boys Baseball

=== Ohio High School Athletic Association State Championships ===
- Boys Soccer - 2014
