= Methodist Episcopal Church (Crestline, Ohio) =

Historic church in Ohio, United States

- U.S. National Register of Historic Places
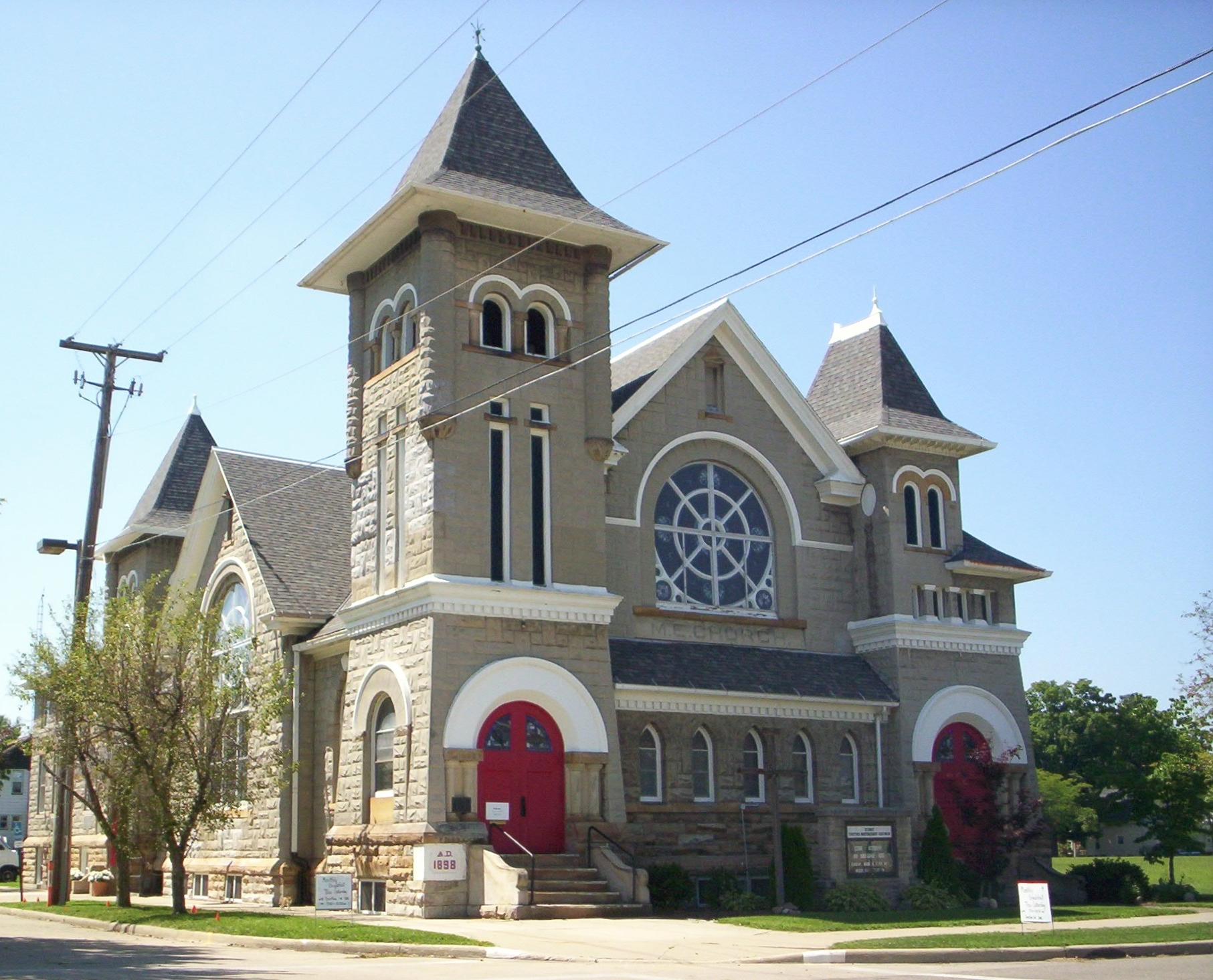
- A view of Methodist Episcopal Church in July 2011.

- Location within Ohio Location within the United States
- Interactive map showing the location of Methodist Episcopalian Church, Crestline
- Location: Thoman and Union Sts., Crestline, Ohio
- Coordinates: 40°47′8″N 82°44′18″W
- Built: 1898
- Architect: Bauer, Minich and Emmer
- Architectural style: Romanesque
- NRHP reference No.: 78002031
- Added to NRHP: October 27, 1978

The Methodist Episcopal Church built in 1890 is an historic Methodist church located at Thoman and Union streets, in Crestline, Ohio. It was built by Bauer, Minich and Emmer in the Romanesque style. On October 27, 1978, it was added to the National Register of Historic Places. It is now the First United Methodist Church.
