= Kidron, Ohio =

- CDP
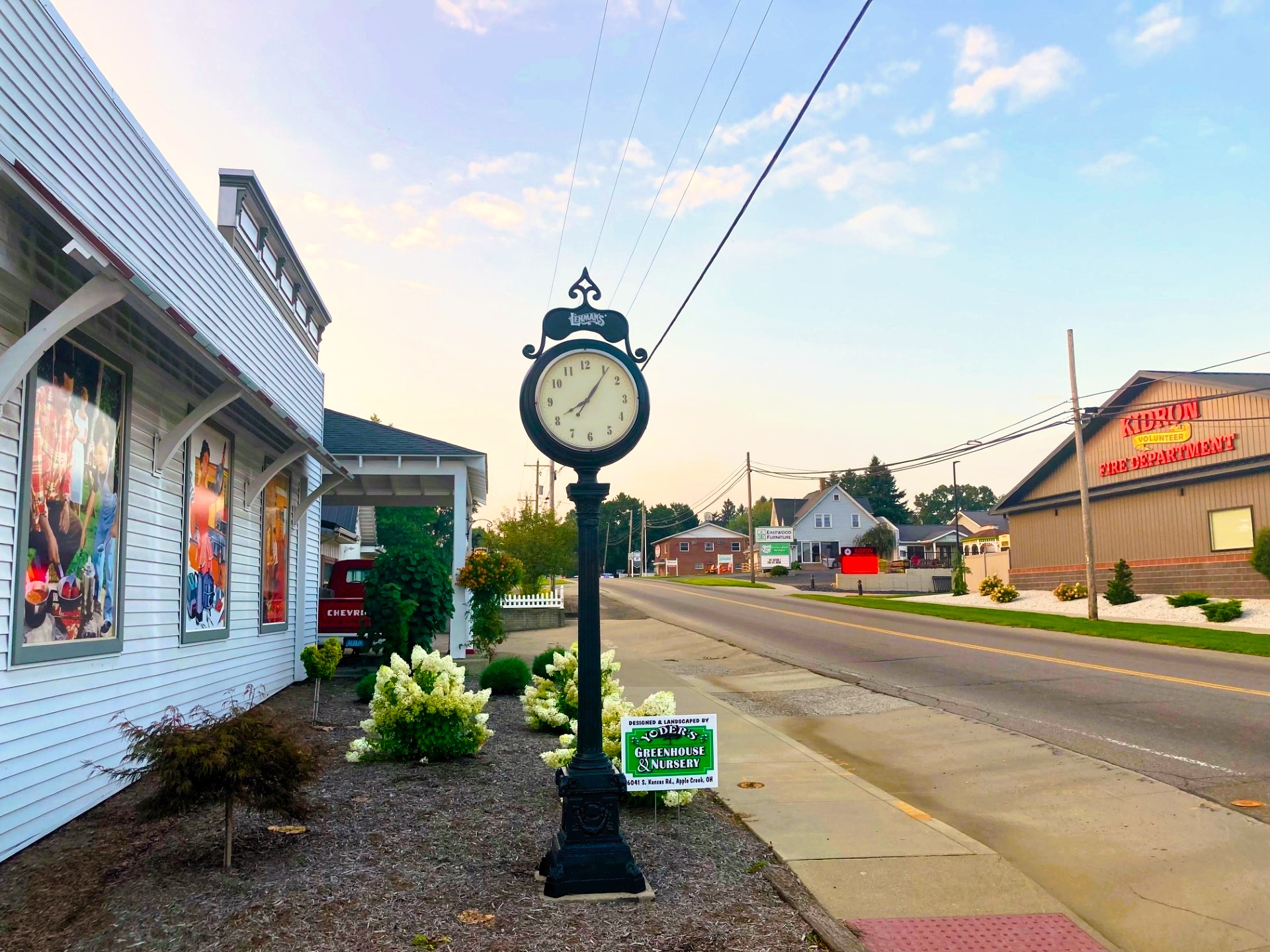
- Downtown Kidron

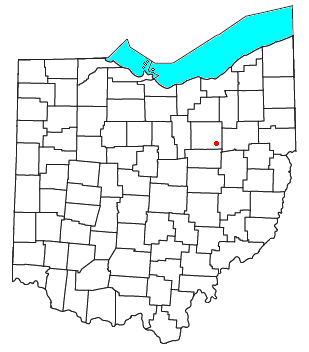
- Location of Kidron, Ohio
- Coordinates: 40°44′38″N 81°44′48″W
- Country: United States
- State: Ohio
- County: Wayne
- Township: Sugar Creek
- Elevation: 1,119 ft (341 m)

Population (2020)
  - Total: 966
- Time zone: UTC-5 (Eastern (EST))
  - Summer (DST): UTC-4 (EDT)
- Area code: 330
- GNIS feature ID: 2584364

Kidron is a census-designated place in southwestern Sugar Creek Township, Wayne County, Ohio, United States. The population was 966 at the 2020 census.

== History ==
Kidron was originally settled in 1819 by a group of Swiss Mennonites wishing to escape religious persecution and poor farming conditions in their homeland in the Sonnenberg area of Switzerland near the Jura Mountains. In Switzerland, the Swiss Mennonites were referred to as "Die Stillen im Lande" meaning "the quiet people in the country." They originally named their new home Sonnenberg, but later this gave way to the present day name of Kidron.

== Education ==
Residents may attend a small public school in the nearby village of Dalton. The Kidron Elementary School was recently torn down (2014), however a new school building (in Dalton) for kindergarten through 8th grade was just built and used in the 2014–2015 school year. Central Christian School is a private K–12 school located in Kidron, and is owned and operated by the Ohio Conference of the Mennonite Church.

== In popular culture ==
On an episode of the Fox TV series 24 that aired on January 26, 2009, a city named "Kidron, Ohio" was the location of a foiled terrorist attack. The city depicted in the show was many times larger than the actual Kidron; its name was chosen because of its obscurity.

== Notable people ==
- Ron Amstutz, Ohio State Senator
