= Tim Seder =

American football player (born 1974)

No. 6, 3
- Position: Placekicker

Personal information
- Born: September 17, 1974 (age 52); Ashland, Ohio, U.S.
- Listed height: 5 ft 10 in (1.78 m)
- Listed weight: 190 lb (86 kg)

Career information
- High school: Ashland
- College: Ashland
- NFL draft: 1998: undrafted

Career history
- Dallas Cowboys (2000–2001); Minnesota Vikings (2002)*; Jacksonville Jaguars (2002); Columbus Destroyers (2005)*; Philadelphia Soul (2005); Utah Blaze (2005)*; Kansas City Brigade (2006)
- * Offseason or practice squad member only

Awards and highlights
- All-MIFC (1997); Baseball second-team All-MIFC (1997)

Career NFL statistics
- Field goals made: 44
- Field goals attempted: 62
- Field goal %: 71
- Longest field goal: 48
- Stats at Pro Football Reference

Career AFL statistics
- Field goals made: 14
- Field goal attempts: 37
- Field goal %: 37.8
- Stats at ArenaFan.com

Timothy R. Seder (born September 17, 1974) is an American former professional football player who was a placekicker in the National Football League (NFL) for the Dallas Cowboys, Minnesota Vikings, and Jacksonville Jaguars. He played college football for the Ashland Eagles.

== Early life ==
Seder attended Ashland High School in Ashland, Ohio. He walked on at Division II Ashland University. He became a starter at placekicker as a freshman, making 6-of-12 field goals and 28-of-29 extra points for 46 points. He would lead the team in scoring in each of his final three seasons.

As a senior, he recorded 64 points on 14-of-19 field goals and 22-of-24 extra point attempts. His 14 field goals ranked second in school history and earned him All-MIFC honors. He received second-team All-MIFC honors as a center fielder in baseball. He finished his college career with 41 field goals (school record) and 204 career points (fourth in school history).

In 2013, he was inducted into the Ashland University Hall of Fame.

== Professional career ==
=== Dallas Cowboys ===
In 2000, although he was only a rookie, he won the placekicker job over rookie Rian Lindell.

As a rookie, he led the Cowboys in scoring with 108 points (third in franchise history by a rookie), converting 25 field goals (franchise record for rookies) for a 75.8% and all 27 extra point opportunities. He also had one rush for a touchdown against the Cincinnati Bengals, which was the first one by a kicker in Cowboys history.

In 2001, he had an eight-yard touchdown run in the fourth game against the Oakland Raiders, although he had 2 field goal attempts blocked. In the fifth game against the Washington Redskins, he scored all Cowboys points including a 26-yard field goal as time expired for a 9-7 win, earning NFC Special Teams Player of the Week honors. In the eighth game against the Atlanta Falcons, he injured his right ankle trying to recover an errant snap from rookie long snapper Randy Chevrier. He was placed on the injured reserve list on November 14. He made 11 out of 17 field goals (64.7%) in the year and was replaced with Jon Hilbert.

On September 1, 2002, he was waived after being passed on the depth chart by rookie Billy Cundiff.

=== Minnesota Vikings ===
On September 1, 2002, he was claimed off waivers by the Minnesota Vikings. He was released on September 3, after spending just one day with the team and losing a kicking tryout against Doug Brien.

=== Jacksonville Jaguars ===
On October 23, 2002, he signed as a free agent with the Jacksonville Jaguars to replace a struggling Hayden Epstein. He was cut on November 26, after making 8-of-12 field goals, missing from 40 yards in a 21-24 loss against the Houston Texans and 41 yards in a 19-21 loss against the Dallas Cowboys. He was replaced with Richie Cunningham.

=== Columbus Destroyers ===
On January 11, 2005, he was signed by the Columbus Destroyers of the Arena Football League. He was waived four days later, on January 15.

=== Philadelphia Soul ===
On March 18, 2005, he signed with the Philadelphia Soul of the Arena Football League. On September 28, he was traded to the Utah Blaze in exchange for Donny Klein.

=== Utah Blaze ===
On November 10, 2005, he was traded along with Fred Ray to the Kansas City Brigade in exchange for Hans Olsen.

=== Kansas City Brigade ===
On January 8, 2006, he was activated by the Kansas City Brigade. He was released on March 16.

== Coaching career ==
From 1998 to 1999, he coached football, baseball and the freshman basketball team, while also teaching health and physical education at Lucas High School.

In 2003, he was a graduate assistant football coach at Ashland University. In 2005, he was a volunteer assistant football coach at Ohio State University. In 2006, he was a volunteer assistant football coach at West Mesquite High School. In 2013, he became a health teacher and the football defensive coordinator at John Horn High School. On March 22, 2018, he was announced as the head coach at North Mesquite High School.
