= Ontario, Ohio =

- City
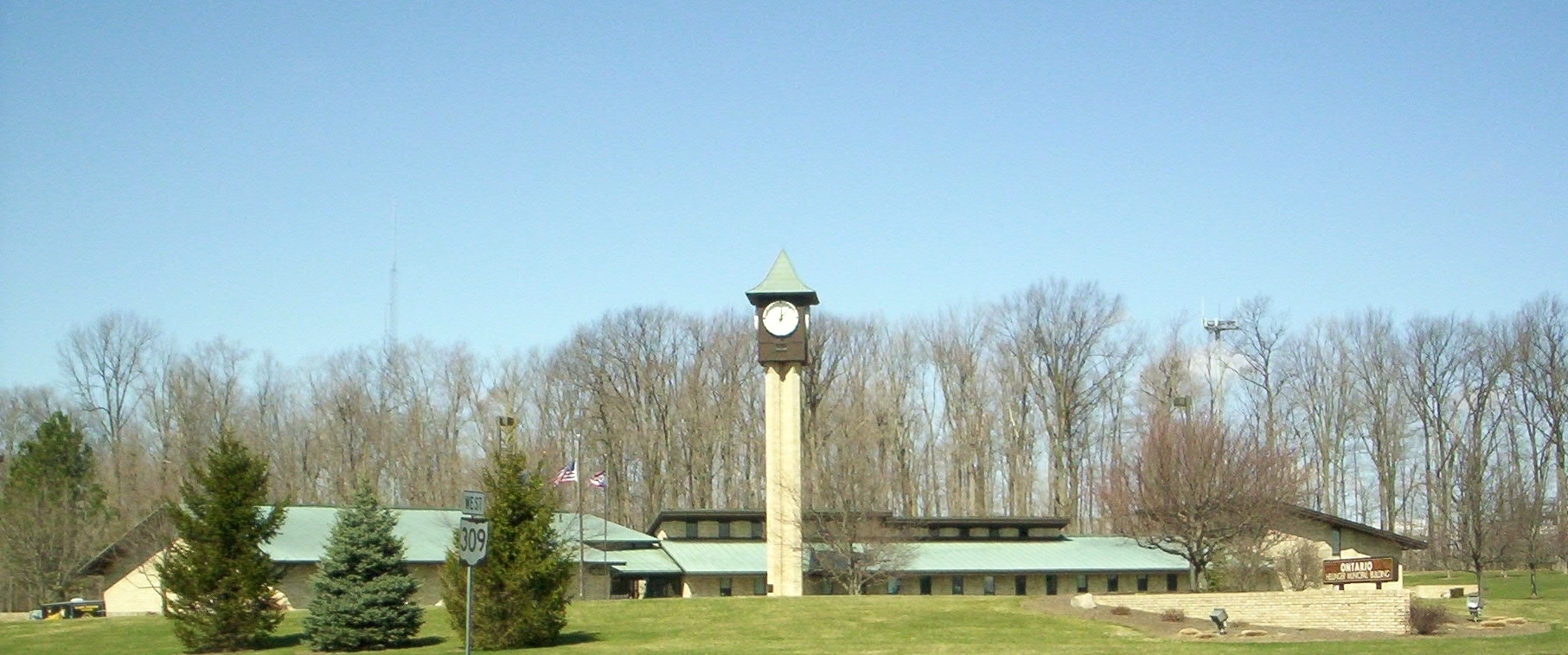
- Ontario Hellinger Municipal Building

- Flag Seal Logo
- Motto: "We Serve Community Education Industry"
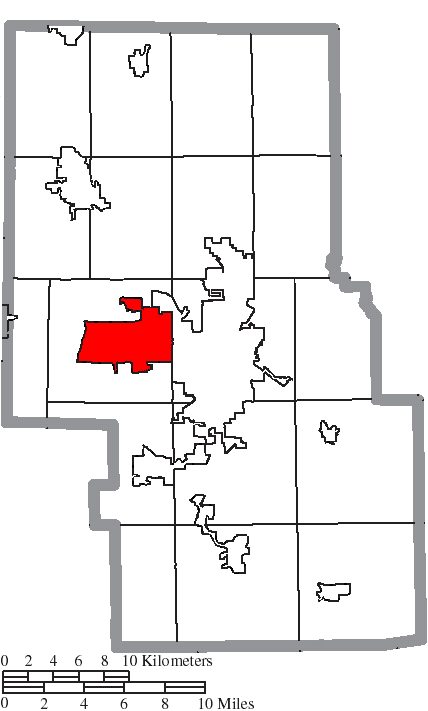
- Location of Ontario in Richland County

- Location within Ohio Location within the United States
- Coordinates: 40°46′05″N 82°36′41″W
- Country: United States
- State: Ohio
- County: Richland
- Founded: 1834
- Incorporated: 1958 (village)
- -: 2001 (city)

Area
  - Total: 11.09 sq mi (28.72 km^{2})
  - Land: 11.07 sq mi (28.66 km^{2})
  - Water: 0.023 sq mi (0.06 km^{2})
- Elevation: 1,371 ft (418 m)

Population (2020)
  - Total: 6,656
  - Density: 601.5/sq mi (232.23/km^{2})
- Time zone: UTC-5 (Eastern (EST))
  - Summer (DST): UTC-4 (EDT)
- ZIP code: 44906
- Area code: 419
- FIPS code: 39-58520
- GNIS feature ID: 2396070
- Website: https://ontarioohio.org/

Ontario is a city in Richland County, Ohio, United States. As of the 2020 census, the city had a population of 6,656. It is part of the Mansfield metropolitan area.

It was founded in 1834 on the western edge of the Allegheny Plateau, just west of the city of Mansfield. After being incorporated in 1958, Ontario became a heavy manufacturing center because of the Erie Railroad line, and its proximity to Mansfield. However, its status in that regard began to decline in the late 20th century, when much of the Erie Railroad that once ran through the city was abandoned; and shifts in the manufacturing industry led to the relocation or repositioning of many factories. The city's industry has since diversified into the service economy, including education, finance and healthcare. The city is also a major regional retail hub serving the entire North-Central Ohio area, with a shopping population of over 150,000.

== History ==
Ontario was founded by Hiram Cook, and was platted in December 1834 as a settlement in Springfield Township near Mansfield. During that same month thereafter, the original settlement of Ontario merged with New Castle, another small settlement that was originally located just to the west of the Ontario settlement along the Mansfield and Bucyrus route (known today as State Route 309) that had just been laid out and platted. New Castle was named for Henry Cassell, while others stated that it was named in honor of Newcastle upon Tyne, a city in England. Ontario was named after Ontario County, New York, the native place of the founder of the town. In 1863, the Atlantic and Great Western Railroad (later Erie Railroad mainline) reached Ontario and a train station was built, but was later demolished after much of the railway was abandoned in the late 20th century.

The arrival of the Lincoln Highway to Ontario in 1913 was a major influence on the development of the town. Upon the advent of the federal numbered highway system in 1928, the Lincoln Highway through Ontario became U.S. Route 30.

In 1956, General Motors built a large Fisher Body stamping plant in Springfield Township and on June 25, 1958, the residents voted to incorporate Ontario into a village to bring the new General Motors plant into Ontario. In 1960, the new Ontario High School was built, complete with an indoor swimming pool, a theatre, 3 shops, and numerous high-tech classrooms and labs for college-preparatory studies. New school construction and renovation has continued over the years, and today the Ontario School District is the main district.

The arrival of both General Motors and the Richland Mall to Ontario was the beginning of the eventual shift of commerce and industry from the adjacent rust belt city of Mansfield to the new suburb-satellite town of Ontario. On June 1, 2009, General Motors filed for Chapter 11 bankruptcy protection and announced that its Ontario stamping plant (Mansfield-Ontario Metal Center) will close in June 2010. Several annexations have been made to Ontario since its incorporation and millions of dollars have been spent on public infrastructure including streets, water and sewer facilities, parks, schools, and new civic buildings for Administrative offices, Public Safety Departments and the Water Department. The city administration offices have been housed in several different locations including the "Old Library" which is now being used as a Senior Center. In 1986, the city's offices were moved to the newly constructed Charles K. Hellinger Municipal Building. On April 30, 2001, Ontario became a city with a population over 5,300.

Since the 1960s, Ontario has been a location of choice for residential development, due in part to its civic administration, its school system, and significant commercial and industrial development.

== Geography ==
According to the United States Census Bureau, the city has a total area of 11.10 square miles (28.75 km^{2}), of which 11.08 square miles (28.70 km^{2}) is land and 0.02 square miles (0.05 km^{2}) is water.

== Demographics ==
=== 2020 census ===
As of the 2020 census, Ontario had a population of 6,656, and the population density was 601.5 inhabitants per square mile (232.2/km^{2}).

The median age was 43.1 years. 21.3% of residents were under the age of 18 and 22.9% of residents were 65 years of age or older. For every 100 females there were 91.1 males, and for every 100 females age 18 and over there were 87.6 males age 18 and over.

There were 2,778 households, of which 28.1% had children under the age of 18 living in them. Of all households, 48.1% were married-couple households, 15.8% were households with a male householder and no spouse or partner present, and 30.8% were households with a female householder and no spouse or partner present. About 31.1% of all households were made up of individuals and 15.9% had someone living alone who was 65 years of age or older. Among the households, 1,817 were families.

There were 2,961 housing units, of which 6.2% were vacant. The homeowner vacancy rate was 1.2% and the rental vacancy rate was 11.8%.

83.0% of residents lived in urban areas, while 17.0% lived in rural areas.

Racial composition as of the 2020 census
Race	Number	Percent
White	5,661	85.1%
Black or African American	303	4.6%
American Indian and Alaska Native	13	0.2%
Asian	199	3.0%
Native Hawaiian and Other Pacific Islander	0	0.0%
Some other race	102	1.5%
Two or more races	378	5.7%
Hispanic or Latino (of any race)	165	2.5%

Historical population
Census	Pop.	Note	%±
1960	3,049		—
1970	4,345		42.5%
1980	4,123		−5.1%
1990	4,026		−2.4%
2000	5,303		31.7%
2010	6,225		17.4%
2020	6,656		6.9%

=== 2010 census ===
As of the census of 2010, there were 6,225 people, 2,616 households, and 1,748 families residing in the city. The population density was 561.8 inhabitants per square mile (216.9/km^{2}). There were 2,808 housing units at an average density of 253.4 per square mile (97.8/km^{2}). The racial makeup of the city was 90.8% White, 4.0% African American, 0.3% Native American, 2.6% Asian, 0.5% from other races, and 1.8% from two or more races. Hispanic or Latino of any race were 1.6% of the population.

There were 2,616 households, of which 30.1% had children under the age of 18 living with them, 52.5% were married couples living together, 10.7% had a female householder with no husband present, 3.6% had a male householder with no wife present, and 33.2% were non-families. 28.9% of all households were made up of individuals, and 14.5% had someone living alone who was 65 years of age or older. The average household size was 2.35 and the average family size was 2.88.

The median age in the city was 43.1 years. 22.8% of residents were under the age of 18; 7.1% were between the ages of 18 and 24; 22.3% were from 25 to 44; 27.7% were from 45 to 64; and 20.2% were 65 years of age or older. The gender makeup of the city was 47.1% male and 52.9% female.

=== 2000 census ===
As of the census of 2000, there were 5,303 people, 2,186 households, and 1,554 families residing in the city. The population density was 485.7 inhabitants per square mile (187.5/km^{2}). The racial makeup of the city was 92.36% White, 4.11% African American, 0.04% Native American, 1.58% Asian, 0.04% Pacific Islander, 0.57% from other races, and 1.30% from two or more races. Hispanic or Latino of any race were 1.07% of the population.

There were 2,186 households, out of which 32.1% had children under the age of 18 living with them, 58.8% were married couples living together, 9.7% had a female householder with no husband present, and 28.9% were non-families. 25.0% of all households were made up of individuals, and 10.6% had someone living alone who was 65 years of age or older. The average household size was 2.43 and the average family size was 2.90.

In the city the population was spread out, with 25.2% under the age of 18, 6.7% from 18 to 24, 28.0% from 25 to 44, 24.8% from 45 to 64, and 15.4% who were 65 years of age or older. The median age was 39 years. For every 100 females, there were 95.0 males. For every 100 females age 18 and over, there were 88.4 males.

The median income for a household in the city was $46,146, and the median income for a family was $51,201. Males had a median income of $41,053 versus $26,250 for females. The per capita income for the city was $22,016. About 6.0% of families and 6.2% of the population were below the poverty line, including 11.6% of those under age 18 and 3.5% of those age 65 or over.

== Education ==
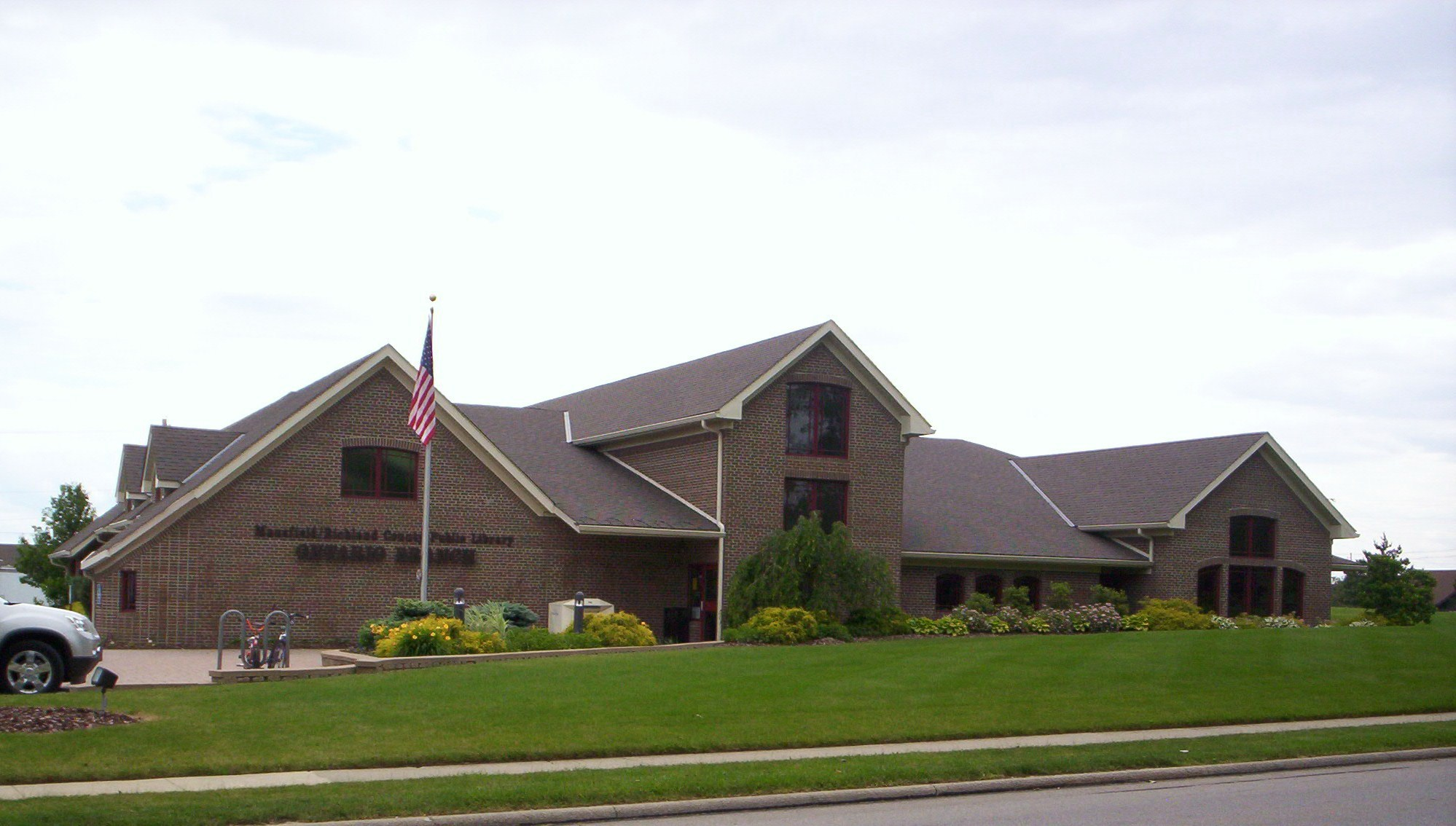
Mansfield/Richland County Public Library Ontario Branch

Ontario Public Schools enroll 1,820 students in public primary and secondary grades. The district administers 3 public schools including one elementary school, one middle school, and one high school (Ontario High School).

=== Libraries ===
The Mansfield/Richland County Public Library operates a library branch in Ontario.

== Transportation ==
=== Railroads ===
In 1863, the Atlantic and Great Western Railroad (later Erie Railroad mainline) reaches Ontario, but was abandoned in the late 20th century. Today, only a 5 miles (8 km) spur of the abandoned Erie Railroad remains. It leads west from the Norfolk Southern Railway in Mansfield to what used to be the General Motors metal stamping plant in Ontario.

=== Highways ===
Ontario is located on a major east-west transportation corridor that was originally known in the early 1900s as "Ohio Market Route 3." This route was chosen in 1913 to become part of the historic Lincoln Highway which was the first road across America, connecting New York City to San Francisco. Upon the advent of the federal numbered highway system in 1928, the Lincoln Highway became U.S. Route 30. In later years, however, the northern route that ran from Ontario to Delphos (now the Lincoln Highway) was improved and became U.S. Route 30N, while the southern route that ran from Ontario to Delphos (now State Route 309) became U.S. Route 30S. In 1974, the divided routes were removed with U.S. Route 30N, becoming U.S. Route 30 and U.S. Route 30S would become State Route 309. In 2005, the newly upgraded section of U.S. Route 30, a four-lane limited access highway between Bucyrus and Ontario open to traffic.

Ontario is connected by four major highways, U.S. Route 30, which connects Mansfield and Interstate 71 to the east with Bucyrus to the west, State Route 309, which connects Mansfield to the east with Galion to the west, State Route 314, which connects Shelby to the north with Chesterville to the south, and State Route 430 (Park Avenue West) connecting Ontario to downtown Mansfield.

Busy thoroughfares in Ontario are; Park Avenue West (State Route 430), West Fourth Street, Walker Lake Road, Home Road (along the eastern city limits at Mansfield), and Lexington-Springmill Road, which connects Springmill and State Route 39 to the north with Lexington to the south.

=== Public transit ===
The Richland County Transit (RCT) operates local bus service five days a week, except for Saturdays and Sundays. The RCT bus line operates 9 fixed routes within the cities of Mansfield and Ontario along with fixed routes extending into the city of Shelby and Madison Township.

== Notable people ==
- Marc Wilkins, major league baseball player
- Charles F. Wishart, President of the College of Wooster from 1919 to 1944
