= Ontario High School (Ohio) =

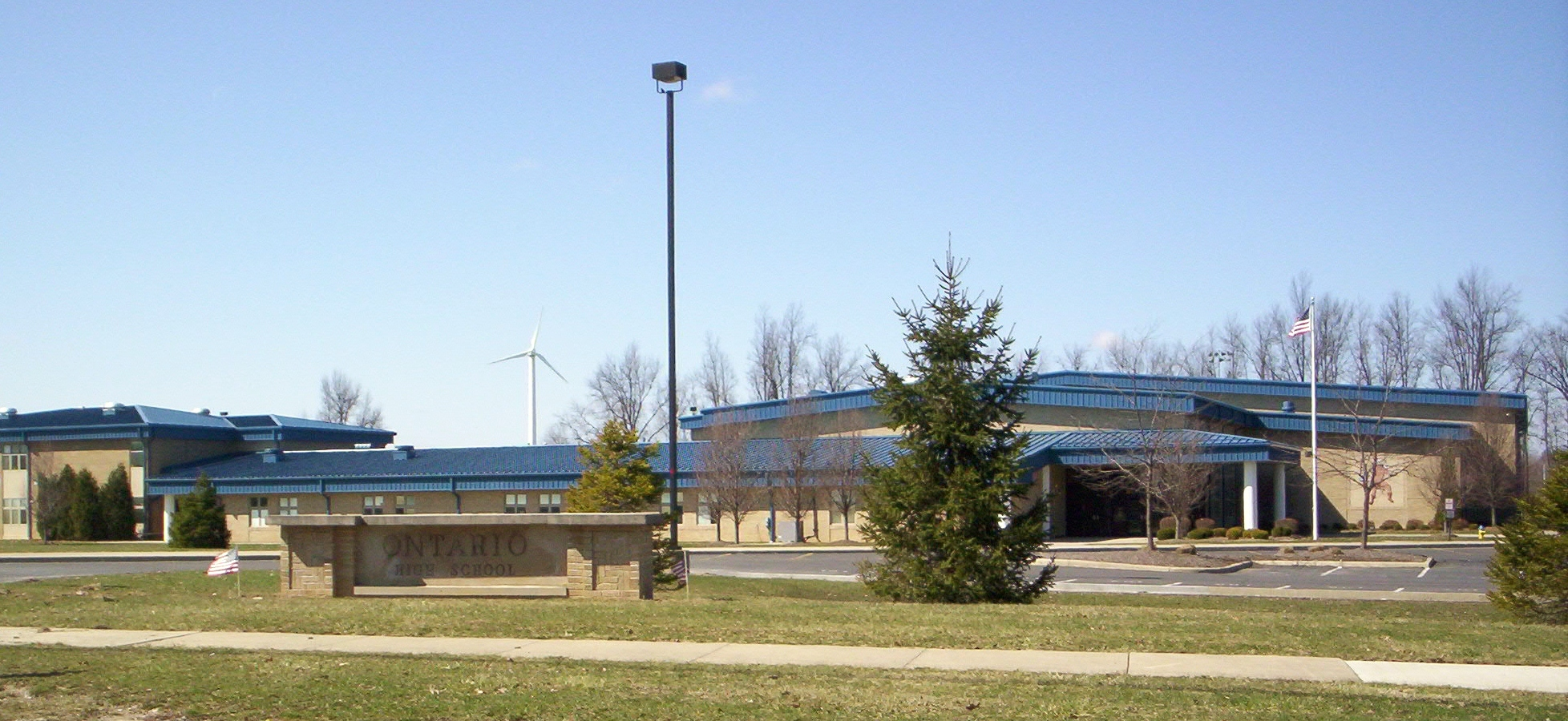

Location
- 467 Shelby Ontario Road; Mansfield, Ohio 44906; United States
- Coordinates: 40°45′57″N 82°38′52″W

Information
- Type: Public high school
- School district: Ontario Local Schools
- Superintendent: Keith Strickler
- Principal: Chris Smith
- Teaching staff: 29.62 (FTE)
- Gender: Coeducational
- Enrollment: 534 (2023–2024)
- Student to teacher ratio: 18.03
- Colors: Blue & Gold
- Athletics conference: Mid-Ohio Athletic Conference
- Nickname: Warriors
- Rival: Lexington
- Website: ontarioschools.org/ontariohighschool_home.aspx

Ontario High School is a public high school located in Ontario, Ohio (U.S). The school serves students in grades 9 to 12 and is part of the Ontario Local Schools district. The school mascot is a warrior.

== Demographics ==
For the 2021–2022 school year, of the 512 students, 417 (81%) were white, 37 (7%) two or more races, 22 (4%) black, 19 (4%) Hispanic, 14 (3%) Asian, two (0.4%) American Indian/Alaska Native, and one (0.2%) Native Hawaiian/Pacific Islander.

== State championships ==
- Boys Baseball – 1994

== Notable alumni ==
- Marc Wilkins – American baseball player (born 1970) – (class of 1989)
