= Crestline, Ohio =

American village in Crawford and Richland Counties in the U.S. state of Ohio

- Village
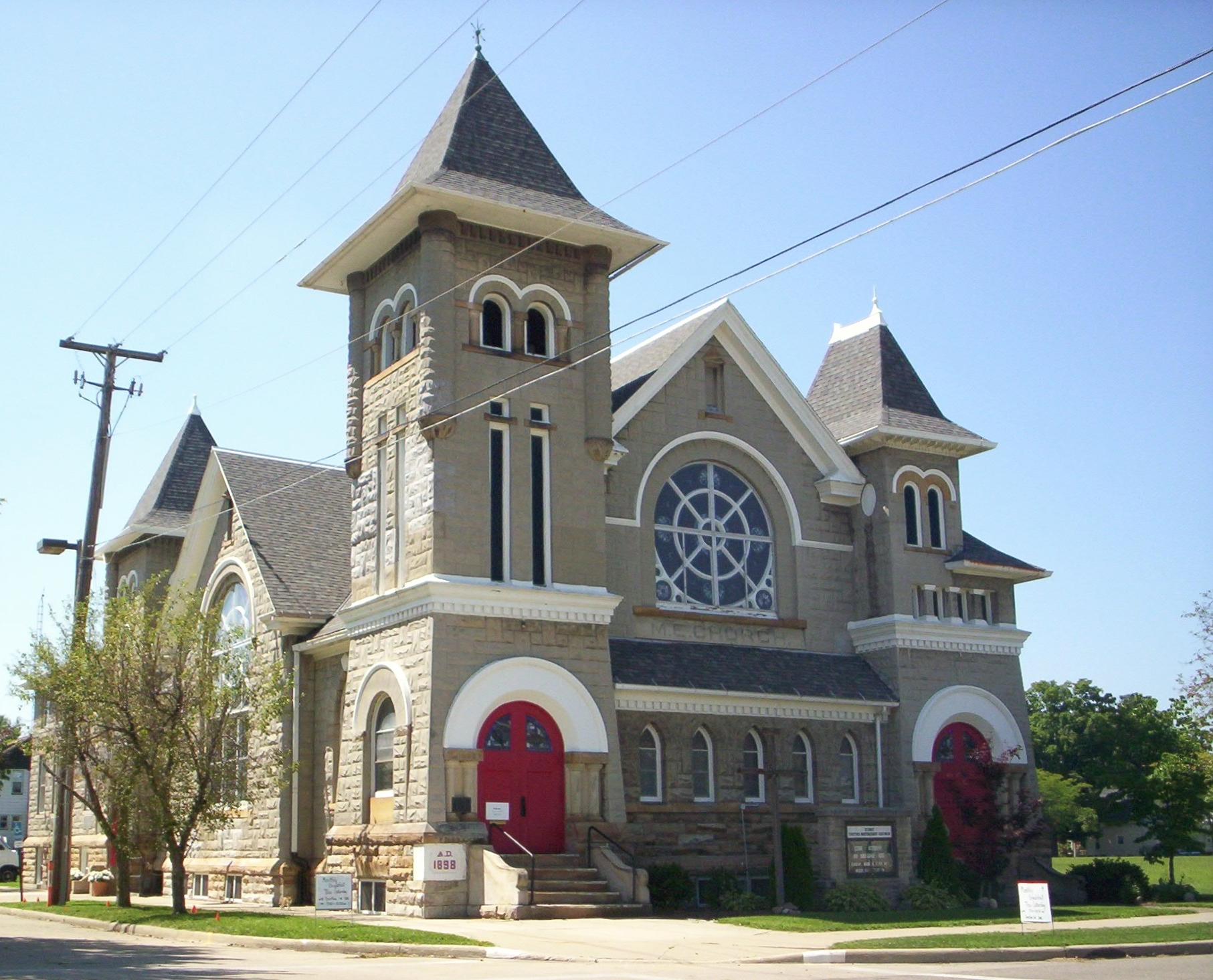
- First United Methodist Church

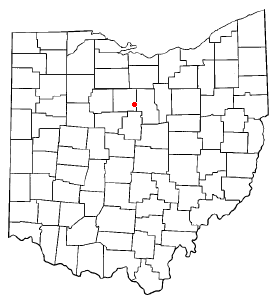
- Location of Crestline, Ohio

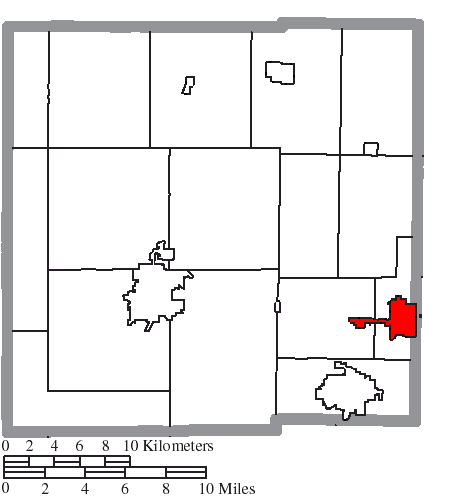
- Location of Crestline in Crawford County
- Coordinates: 40°46′56″N 82°45′35″W
- Country: United States
- State: Ohio
- Counties: Crawford, Richland
- Township: Jackson, Jefferson, Sandusky
- Founded: 1851

Government
  - Mayor: Linda Horning Pitt

Area
  - Total: 3.40 sq mi (8.80 km^{2})
  - Land: 3.39 sq mi (8.79 km^{2})
  - Water: 0.0039 sq mi (0.01 km^{2})
- Elevation: 1,152 ft (351 m)

Population (2020)
  - Total: 4,525
  - Estimate (2023): 4,460
  - Density: 1,333.2/sq mi (514.76/km^{2})
- Time zone: UTC-5 (Eastern (EST))
  - Summer (DST): UTC-4 (EDT)
- ZIP code: 44827
- Area code: 419
- FIPS code: 39-19330
- GNIS feature ID: 2393671
- Website: http://www.crestlineoh.com/

Crestline is a village in Crawford and Richland Counties in the U.S. state of Ohio. Crestline's population was 4,525 at the 2020 census. It is the third largest municipality in Crawford County. The Crawford County portion of Crestline is part of the Bucyrus Micropolitan Statistical Area, while the small portion of the village that extends into Richland County is considered part of the Mansfield Metropolitan Statistical Area. Both sections form the Mansfield–Bucyrus, OH Combined Statistical Area.

== History ==
=== Early history ===
The Cleveland, Columbus and Cincinnati Railroad, or the "Bee Line" as it was known then, predated Crestline. Since there was no town between Shelby and Galion, it was decided that a station should be placed halfway for passenger convenience. The station was constructed where the line crossed the Leesville road.

Crestline was platted in 1852. It was once thought to be the highest point in Ohio and was named from its high elevation.

This station soon developed into a village, with a general store, post office, and a few homes. Early settlers in the village believed that the town was the watershed of the state, where streams to the north emptied into Lake Erie and those to the south emptied into the Ohio River, thus the name Crestline. The town was not directly on the watershed line (but rather just north of the divide), but the name stuck and eventually became one word.

=== Abraham Lincoln's funeral train ===
Following his death by assassination, the body of Abraham Lincoln was brought from Washington, D.C. to its final resting place in Lincoln's hometown of Springfield, Illinois, by funeral train. The train left Washington, D.C., on April 21, 1865, at 12:30 pm and traveled 1,654 miles (2,662 km) to Springfield, arriving on May 3, 1865. Several stops were made along the way, including Crestline on April 29, 1865, at 4:07 am.

=== 20th century ===
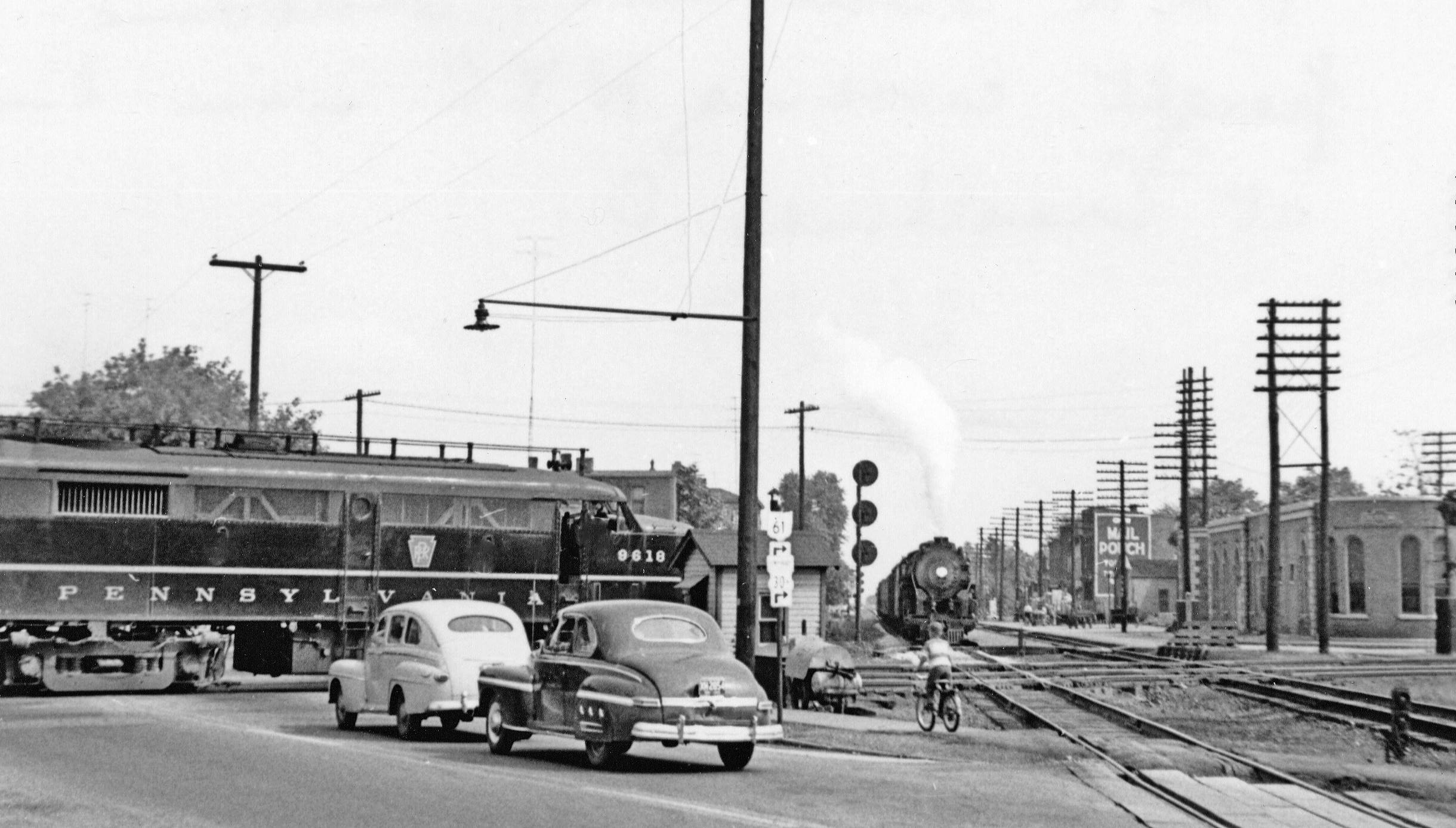
New York Central line crossing the Pennsylvania Railroad mainline, along with Ohio State Route 61 in Crestline

During its heyday, Crestline was a division point for the Pennsylvania Railroad's Pittsburgh, Fort Wayne and Chicago Railway. The city housed major engine facilities and would often be the point where motive power was changed for the relatively flat runs to and from Chicago, Illinois. In addition to the town's station being a stop on the Pennsylvania Railroad's east–west trains, the station served as a transfer point to the New York Central Railroad's northeast–southwest trains.

On November 1, 1903, two Pennsylvania line train cars carrying dynamite exploded, causing damage to the rail lines and several train cars. This disaster is noted as one of the catalysts which began the regulation of the shipping of hazardous substances.

The Pennsylvania Railroad's engine facilities included a roundhouse on Crestline Road, decommissioned in 1968 in the aftermath of the merger between the Pennsylvania Railroad and the New York Central Railroad to form Penn Central. Demolition of the historic roundhouse commenced in 2007 after years of neglect. But, some buildings still stand. Today, Chicago, Fort Wayne and Eastern Railroad, CSX and Norfolk Southern trains operate in and around Crestline.

=== 21st century ===
On September 4, 2017, at approximately 10:45 p.m. a tornado passed from the west to just north of the village causing extensive damage to rural properties near the village. The National Weather Service classified the twister as an EF-2 with winds above 115 miles per hour. This incident was a rare event.

== Geography ==
Crestline is located along the Sandusky River near its headwaters.

According to the United States Census Bureau, the city has a total area of 3.18 square miles (8.24 km^{2}), of which 3.17 square miles (8.21 km^{2}) is land and 0.01 square miles (0.03 km^{2}) is water.

== Demographics ==
Historical population
Census	Pop.	Note	%±
1860	1,487		—
1870	2,279		53.3%
1880	2,848		25.0%
1890	2,911		2.2%
1900	3,282		12.7%
1910	3,807		16.0%
1920	4,313		13.3%
1930	4,425		2.6%
1940	4,337		−2.0%
1950	4,614		6.4%
1960	5,521		19.7%
1970	5,947		7.7%
1980	5,406		−9.1%
1990	4,934		−8.7%
2000	5,088		3.1%
2010	4,630		−9.0%
2020	4,525		−2.3%
2023 (est.)	4,460	▼	−1.4%
U.S. Decennial Census

=== 2020 census ===
As of the 2020 census, Crestline had a population of 4,525. The median age was 39.7 years. 23.7% of residents were under the age of 18 and 18.8% of residents were 65 years of age or older. For every 100 females there were 92.5 males, and for every 100 females age 18 and over there were 88.1 males age 18 and over.

99.9% of residents lived in urban areas, while 0.1% lived in rural areas.

There were 1,987 households in Crestline, of which 26.2% had children under the age of 18 living in them. Of all households, 36.9% were married-couple households, 21.3% were households with a male householder and no spouse or partner present, and 31.9% were households with a female householder and no spouse or partner present. About 34.4% of all households were made up of individuals and 14.7% had someone living alone who was 65 years of age or older.

There were 2,182 housing units, of which 8.9% were vacant. The homeowner vacancy rate was 1.8% and the rental vacancy rate was 6.8%.

Racial composition as of the 2020 census
Race	Number	Percent
White	4,168	92.1%
Black or African American	97	2.1%
American Indian and Alaska Native	3	0.1%
Asian	16	0.4%
Native Hawaiian and Other Pacific Islander	1	0.0%
Some other race	15	0.3%
Two or more races	225	5.0%
Hispanic or Latino (of any race)	57	1.3%

=== 2010 census ===
As of the census of 2010, there were 4,630 people, 1,914 households, and 1,256 families residing in the city. The population density was 1,460.6 inhabitants per square mile (563.9/km^{2}). There were 2,169 housing units at an average density of 684.2 per square mile (264.2/km^{2}). The racial makeup of the city was 94.1% White, 2.7% African American, 0.2% Native American, 0.5% Asian, 0.2% from other races, and 2.3% from two or more races. Hispanic or Latino of any race were 1.1% of the population.

There were 1,914 households, of which 33.6% had children under the age of 18 living with them, 44.0% were married couples living together, 15.1% had a female householder with no husband present, 6.5% had a male householder with no wife present, and 34.4% were non-families. 30.0% of all households were made up of individuals, and 13.6% had someone living alone who was 65 years of age or older. The average household size was 2.41 and the average family size was 2.94.

The median age in the city was 37.8 years. 26.6% of residents were under the age of 18; 9.3% were between the ages of 18 and 24; 22.8% were from 25 to 44; 24.8% were from 45 to 64; and 16.5% were 65 years of age or older. The gender makeup of the city was 47.6% male and 52.4% female.

=== 2000 census ===
As of the census of 2000, there were 5,088 people, 2,070 households, and 1,370 families residing in the city. The population density was 1,761.8 inhabitants per square mile (680.2/km^{2}). There were 2,251 housing units at an average density of 779.5 per square mile (301.0/km^{2}). The racial makeup of the city was 96.58% White, 1.81% African American, 0.18% Native American, 0.26% Asian, 0.06% Pacific Islander, 0.22% from other races, and 0.90% from two or more races. Hispanic or Latino of any race were 0.67% of the population.

There were 2,070 households, out of which 33.3% had children under the age of 18 living with them, 48.9% were married couples living together, 12.6% had a female householder with no husband present, and 33.8% were non-families. 29.2% of all households were made up of individuals, and 13.1% had someone living alone who was 65 years of age or older. The average household size was 2.44 and the average family size was 3.01.

In the city the population was spread out, with 26.7% under the age of 18, 8.6% from 18 to 24, 29.1% from 25 to 44, 21.0% from 45 to 64, and 14.5% who were 65 years of age or older. The median age was 36 years. For every 100 females there were 92.1 males. For every 100 females age 18 and over, there were 87.9 males.

The median income for a household in the city was $31,392, and the median income for a family was $37,275. Males had a median income of $33,520 versus $22,455 for females. The per capita income for the city was $16,522. About 9.8% of families and 12.4% of the population were below the poverty line, including 16.5% of those under age 18 and 5.2% of those age 65 or over.

== Government ==
The Census Bureau recognizes Crestline as a village, its 2026 population of 4,471 makes it a village under Ohio law.

Crestline operates under a mayor-council system, with a council of six members: Cheryl Downey, Kevin Eckert, David Sharrock, Kimberly-Bauer Gonzales, Robert Salvati, and Mike Weisman.

== Education ==
The village is served by the Crestline Exempted Village School District.

== Notable people ==
- Gates Brown, baseball player
- Les Channell, baseball player
- Frank Emmer, baseball player
- Mark Fenton, actor
- Mike Gottfried, football coach, commentator
- Jack Harbaugh, football player, coach, and father of NFL coaches John and Jim Harbaugh
- Kevin Keith, American prisoner
- Robert Kurtzman, film director, producer, screenwriter, special effects artist
- Marabel Morgan, author, anti-feminist
- Augusta W. Urquhart, (1870-1960), social leader, clubwoman
