= Crawford County, Ohio =

County in Ohio, United States

- County
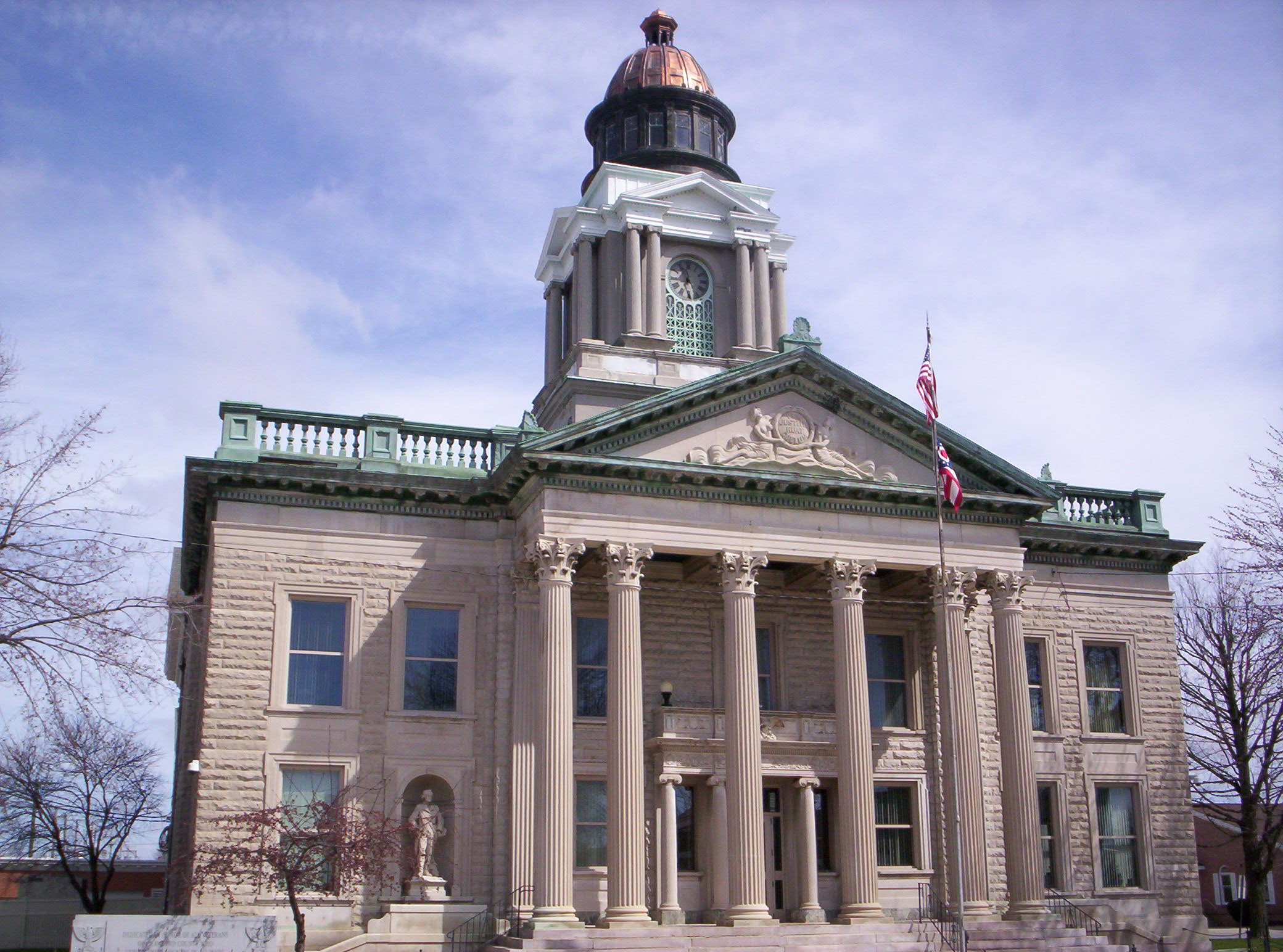
- Crawford County Courthouse

- Flag Seal

- Location within the U.S. state of Ohio
- Coordinates: 40°51′N 82°55′W
- Country: United States
- State: Ohio
- Founded: April 1, 1826
- Named for: Colonel William Crawford
- Seat: Bucyrus
- Largest city: Bucyrus

Area
  - Total: 403 sq mi (1,040 km^{2})
  - Land: 402 sq mi (1,040 km^{2})
  - Water: 0.9 sq mi (2.3 km^{2}) 0.2%

Population (2020)
  - Total: 42,025
  - Estimate (2025): 41,896 ▼
  - Density: 100/sq mi (39/km^{2})
- Time zone: UTC−5 (Eastern)
  - Summer (DST): UTC−4 (EDT)
- Congressional district: 5th
- Website: www.crawford-co.org

Crawford County is a county located in the north central portion of the U.S. state of Ohio. As of the 2020 census, the population was 42,025. Its county seat and largest city is Bucyrus. The county was created in 1820 and later organized in 1836. It was named for Colonel William Crawford, a soldier during the American Revolution. Crawford County comprises the Bucyrus, OH Micropolitan Statistical Area, which is also included in the Mansfield-Ashland-Bucyrus, OH Combined Statistical Area.

== Geography ==
According to the U.S. Census Bureau, the county has a total area of 403 square miles (1,040 km^{2}), of which 402 square miles (1,040 km^{2}) is land and 0.9 square miles (2.3 km^{2}) (0.2%) is water. It is the fourth-smallest county in Ohio by total area.

The county is drained by the Sandusky and Olentangy Rivers.

=== Adjacent counties ===
- Seneca County (north)
- Huron County (northeast)
- Richland County (east)
- Morrow County (southeast)
- Marion County (southwest)
- Wyandot County (west)

== Demographics ==
Historical population
Census	Pop.	Note	%±
1830	4,791		—
1840	13,152		174.5%
1850	18,177		38.2%
1860	23,881		31.4%
1870	25,556		7.0%
1880	30,583		19.7%
1890	31,927		4.4%
1900	33,915		6.2%
1910	34,036		0.4%
1920	36,054		5.9%
1930	35,345		−2.0%
1940	35,571		0.6%
1950	38,738		8.9%
1960	46,775		20.7%
1970	50,364		7.7%
1980	50,075		−0.6%
1990	47,870		−4.4%
2000	46,966		−1.9%
2010	43,784		−6.8%
2020	42,025		−4.0%
2025 (est.)	41,896	▼	−0.3%
U.S. Decennial Census; 1790-1960 1900-1990; 1990-2000 2020

=== 2020 census ===
As of the 2020 census, the county had a population of 42,025 and a median age of 44.5 years. 21.1% of residents were under the age of 18 and 21.8% were 65 years of age or older. For every 100 females there were 95.9 males, and for every 100 females age 18 and over there were 93.9 males.

The racial makeup of the county was 94.4% White, 0.8% Black or African American, 0.1% American Indian and Alaska Native, 0.3% Asian, <0.1% Native Hawaiian and Pacific Islander, 0.4% from some other race, and 4.0% from two or more races. Hispanic or Latino residents of any race comprised 1.5% of the population.

65.9% of residents lived in urban areas, while 34.1% lived in rural areas.

There were 18,069 households in the county, of which 26.2% had children under the age of 18 living in them. Of all households, 44.6% were married-couple households, 19.4% were households with a male householder and no spouse or partner present, and 27.3% were households with a female householder and no spouse or partner present. About 31.8% of all households were made up of individuals and 15.3% had someone living alone who was 65 years of age or older.

There were 19,865 housing units, of which 9.0% were vacant. Among occupied housing units, 68.4% were owner-occupied and 31.6% were renter-occupied. The homeowner vacancy rate was 2.0% and the rental vacancy rate was 8.8%.

=== Racial and ethnic composition ===
Crawford County, Ohio – Racial and ethnic composition Note: the US Census treats Hispanic/Latino as an ethnic category. This table excludes Latinos from the racial categories and assigns them to a separate category. Hispanics/Latinos may be of any race.
Race / Ethnicity (NH = Non-Hispanic)	Pop 1980	Pop 1990	Pop 2000	Pop 2010	Pop 2020	% 1980	% 1990	% 2000	% 2010	% 2020
White alone (NH)	49,256	47,188	45,787	42,227	39,388	98.36%	98.58%	97.49%	96.44%	93.73%
Black or African American alone (NH)	298	252	275	375	305	0.60%	0.53%	0.59%	0.86%	0.73%
Native American or Alaska Native alone (NH)	41	66	87	48	40	0.08%	0.14%	0.19%	0.11%	0.10%
Asian alone (NH)	89	111	145	156	131	0.18%	0.23%	0.31%	0.36%	0.31%
Native Hawaiian or Pacific Islander alone (NH)	x	x	9	7	12	x	x	0.02%	0.02%	0.03%
Other race alone (NH)	41	7	32	28	70	0.08%	0.01%	0.07%	0.06%	0.17%
Mixed race or Multiracial (NH)	x	x	270	410	1,441	x	x	0.57%	0.94%	3.43%
Hispanic or Latino (any race)	350	246	361	533	638	0.70%	0.51%	0.77%	1.22%	1.52%
Total	50,075	47,870	46,966	43,784	42,025	100.00%	100.00%	100.00%	100.00%	100.00%

=== 2010 census ===
As of the 2010 United States census, there were 43,784 people, 18,099 households, and 12,108 families living in the county. The population density was 109.0 inhabitants per square mile (42.1/km^{2}). There were 20,167 housing units at an average density of 50.2 units per square mile (19.4 units/km^{2}). The racial makeup of the county was 97.2% white, 0.9% black or African American, 0.4% Asian, 0.1% American Indian, 0.3% from other races, and 1.1% from two or more races. Those of Hispanic or Latino origin made up 1.2% of the population. In terms of ancestry, 43.3% were German, 14.3% were Irish, 13.7% were American, and 11.0% were English.

Of the 18,099 households, 29.9% had children under the age of 18 living with them, 50.6% were married couples living together, 11.5% had a female householder with no husband present, 33.1% were non-families, and 28.4% of all households were made up of individuals. The average household size was 2.39 and the average family size was 2.89. The median age was 41.9 years.

The median income for a household in the county was $41,228 and the median income for a family was $49,647. Males had a median income of $40,304 versus $28,118 for females. The per capita income for the county was $20,590. About 10.8% of families and 13.0% of the population were below the poverty line, including 21.3% of those under age 18 and 6.2% of those age 65 or over.

=== 2000 census ===
As of the census of 2000, there were 46,966 people, 18,957 households, and 13,175 families living in the county. The population density was 117 inhabitants per square mile (45/km^{2}). There were 20,178 housing units at an average density of 50 units per square mile (19/km^{2}). The racial makeup of the county was 97.99% White, 0.59% Black or African American, 0.20% Native American, 0.31% Asian, 0.02% Pacific Islander, 0.24% from other races, and 0.65% from two or more races. 0.77% of the population were Hispanic or Latino of any race. 40.4% were of German, 21.4% American, 8.1% English and 7.8% Irish ancestry according to Census 2000.

There were 18,957 households, out of which 31.20% had children under the age of 18 living with them, 55.10% were married couples living together, and 30.50% were non-families. 26.30% of all households were made up of individuals, and 11.50% had someone living alone who was 65 years of age or older. The average household size was 2.45 and the average family size was 2.94.

In the county, the population was spread out, with 24.90% under the age of 18, 8.00% from 18 to 24, 27.60% from 25 to 44, 24.30% from 45 to 64, and 15.20% who were 65 years of age or older. The median age was 38 years. For every 100 females there were 93.40 males. For every 100 females age 18 and over, there were 90.80 males.

The median income for a household in the county was $36,227, and the median income for a family was $43,169. Males had a median income of $33,319 versus $21,346 for females. The per capita income for the county was $17,466. About 7.80% of families and 10.40% of the population were below the poverty line, including 13.70% of those under age 18 and 7.50% of those age 65 or over.

According to the United States Census Bureau, women make up about 51.3% of the population, as of 2014.

== Politics ==
Prior to 1924, Crawford County was a strongly Democratic county. Since then, it has become strongly Republican, only backing Democratic candidates three times since then.

Wind power plants are prohibited in Crawford County. In 2022, the county voted overwhelmingly to uphold the ban.

United States presidential election results for Crawford County, Ohio
Year	Republican		Democratic		Third party(ies)	
Year	No.	%	No.	%	No.	%
1856	1,685	43.53%	2,154	55.64%	32	0.83%
1860	2,064	41.69%	2,752	55.58%	135	2.73%
1864	1,955	38.34%	3,144	61.66%	0	0.00%
1868	2,019	35.89%	3,607	64.11%	0	0.00%
1872	2,081	36.36%	3,595	62.81%	48	0.84%
1876	2,312	34.54%	4,365	65.22%	16	0.24%
1880	2,622	36.10%	4,567	62.87%	75	1.03%
1884	2,731	35.40%	4,851	62.88%	133	1.72%
1888	2,681	33.58%	5,085	63.68%	219	2.74%
1892	2,479	32.25%	4,858	63.21%	349	4.54%
1896	3,150	34.37%	5,915	64.53%	101	1.10%
1900	3,150	33.98%	5,968	64.39%	151	1.63%
1904	3,314	39.90%	4,493	54.09%	499	6.01%
1908	3,061	32.84%	6,006	64.44%	253	2.71%
1912	1,432	17.80%	4,733	58.84%	1,879	23.36%
1916	2,673	29.80%	6,014	67.05%	283	3.15%
1920	7,082	44.74%	8,467	53.49%	280	1.77%
1924	5,896	40.83%	4,384	30.36%	4,160	28.81%
1928	11,235	66.90%	5,472	32.59%	86	0.51%
1932	6,538	37.32%	10,593	60.47%	386	2.20%
1936	6,638	36.04%	10,955	59.48%	826	4.48%
1940	10,336	53.55%	8,966	46.45%	0	0.00%
1944	10,464	59.65%	7,079	40.35%	0	0.00%
1948	8,862	53.70%	7,600	46.05%	41	0.25%
1952	13,370	66.12%	6,852	33.88%	0	0.00%
1956	13,763	70.46%	5,769	29.54%	0	0.00%
1960	14,558	67.59%	6,981	32.41%	0	0.00%
1964	8,970	42.84%	11,968	57.16%	0	0.00%
1968	11,898	56.64%	6,737	32.07%	2,373	11.30%
1972	14,632	69.50%	5,518	26.21%	903	4.29%
1976	10,801	57.24%	7,553	40.03%	516	2.73%
1980	12,424	62.89%	6,058	30.67%	1,273	6.44%
1984	14,682	74.08%	4,932	24.88%	206	1.04%
1988	12,472	66.70%	6,018	32.18%	210	1.12%
1992	8,618	41.36%	6,351	30.48%	5,866	28.15%
1996	8,730	44.88%	7,449	38.30%	3,272	16.82%
2000	11,666	60.84%	6,721	35.05%	789	4.11%
2004	13,885	63.69%	7,773	35.65%	143	0.66%
2008	12,316	58.03%	8,289	39.05%	620	2.92%
2012	11,852	59.72%	7,507	37.82%	488	2.46%
2016	13,611	70.42%	4,625	23.93%	1,093	5.65%
2020	15,436	74.52%	4,916	23.73%	361	1.74%
2024	15,402	75.74%	4,683	23.03%	251	1.23%

United States Senate election results for Crawford County, Ohio1
Year	Republican		Democratic		Third party(ies)	
Year	No.	%	No.	%	No.	%
2024	13,938	69.24%	5,400	26.82%	793	3.94%

== Transportation ==
The Port Bucyrus–Crawford County Airport is located one nautical mile (1.2 mi; 1.9 km) south of Bucyrus's central business district.

== Communities ==
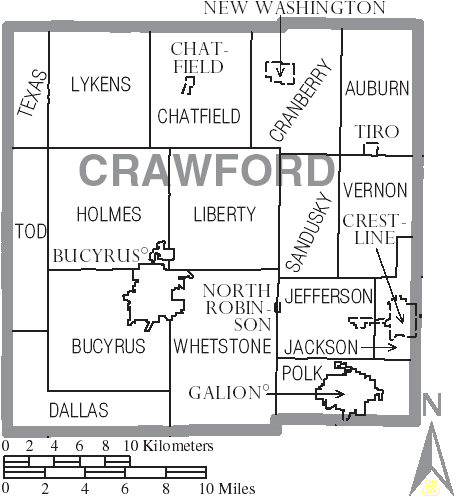
Map of Crawford County, Ohio with Municipal and Township Labels

=== Cities ===
- Bucyrus (county seat)
- Galion

=== Villages ===
- Chatfield
- Crestline
- New Washington
- North Robinson
- Tiro

=== Townships ===
- Auburn
- Bucyrus
- Chatfield
- Cranberry
- Dallas
- Holmes
- Jackson
- Jefferson
- Liberty
- Lykens
- Polk
- Sandusky
- Texas
- Tod
- Vernon
- Whetstone

=== Census-designated places ===
- Oceola
- Sulphur Springs

=== Unincorporated communities ===
- Auburn Center
- Benton
- Brokensword
- DeKalb
- Leesville
- Lemert
- Lykens
- Mechanicsburg
- Middletown
- Monnett
- New Winchester
- Olentangy
- Plankton
- Waynesburg
- West Liberty

== Libraries ==
The following libraries serve the communities of Crawford County.

- Bucyrus Public Library in Bucyrus, Ohio
- Crestline Public Library in Crestline, Ohio
- Galion Public Library in Galion, Ohio

== See also ==
- National Register of Historic Places listings in Crawford County, Ohio
