= Olentangy, Ohio =

OIlentangy, Ohio may refer to:

- Olentangy, Crawford County, Ohio
- Olentangy West, Columbus, Ohio
