= Worthington-New Haven State Road =

Road in Ohio, United States

Old State Road

Route information
- Length: 69.1 mi (111.2 km)
- Existed: ca. 1820–present

Major junctions
- South end: US 23 in Worthington, OH
- SR 750 in Columbus, OH; US 36 / SR 37 near Berkshire, Ohio; SR 521 in Kilbourne, Ohio; SR 229 near Marengo, OH; SR 529 near Cardington, OH; US 42 / SR 95 / SR 61 in Mount Gilead, OH; SR 288 / SR 309 near Iberia, OH; SR 19 in Galion, OH; US 30 in Galion, OH; SR 96 in West Liberty, Ohio; SR 39 near Tiro, OH; SR 98 near Auburn Center, Ohio
- North end: SR 61 in New Haven, OH

Location
- Country: United States
- State: Ohio

Highway system
- Ohio State Highway System; Interstate; US; State; Scenic

The Worthington-New Haven State Road, also known as the Old State Road, is a major road in north-central Ohio, United States, extending from the Columbus suburb of Worthington, in Franklin County, to the village of New Haven, in Huron County, Ohio.

== History ==
In the early 1800s, the legislature of Ohio authorized many state roads to be constructed, in order to connect the major cities of the state with well-engineered roadways (in order to replace the often-treacherous Native American trails, which were still the primary thoroughfares). The Worthington-New Haven state road was built circa 1820 after an act passed by the General Assembly authorized its construction. Unlike many other pre-railroad state roads around Ohio, the New Haven road was evidently not significantly realigned over its lifetime, with exception of the section near Alum Creek Lake (which partially inundated the road south of U.S. Route 36).
