= Lemert, Ohio =

Unincorporated community in Ohio, U.S.

- Unincorporated community
- Interactive map of Lemert, Ohio
- Coordinates: 40.8942234°N 83.0935253°W
- Country: United States
- State: Ohio
- County: Crawford County
- Township: Tod Township
- Established: 1880
- Founder: Col. W. E. Lemert
- Named for: Col. W. E. Lemert

Government
  - Body: Tod Township Board of Trustees
- Elevation: 958 ft (292 m)
- Highest elevation: 1,020 ft (310 m)
- Lowest elevation: 915 ft (279 m)
- Time zone: UTC-5 (EST)
  - Summer (DST): UTC-4 (EDT)
- Postal code: 44882
- Area code: 419

Lemert is an unincorporated community in Tod Township, Crawford County, Ohio, United States.

== History ==
Lemert was laid out in 1880, named for Col. W. E. Lemert, builder of the Toledo and Ohio Central (T & OC) Railroad. Lemert plotted a village at the site of his work camp, founding Lemert.

In 1875, Valentine Underwood bought a farm of seventy-five acres in Tod Township. Underwood leased the Oceola mills for four years, and around 1897, began operating the Lemert roller mills. The mills had a capacity of one hundred barrels.

In 1897, the town's church, the Lemert Methodist Protestant Church, was established. Its first service was held on October 3, 1897, and underwent major remodeling in 1950. The church is no longer active, as it closed on June 30, 2023.

After the Lemert T & OC railroad station went out of service, it was repurposed as the office for the grain elevator in the village, before eventually being destroyed by fire.
