= Waynesburg =

Waynesburg is the name of some places in the United States:

- Waynesburg, Indiana
- Waynesburg, Crawford County, Ohio
- Waynesburg, Ohio, in Stark County
- Waynesburg, Pennsylvania
- also a former name (until 1826) of Jersey Shore, Pennsylvania
