= Tully Township, Marion County, Ohio =

Township in Ohio, US

- Township
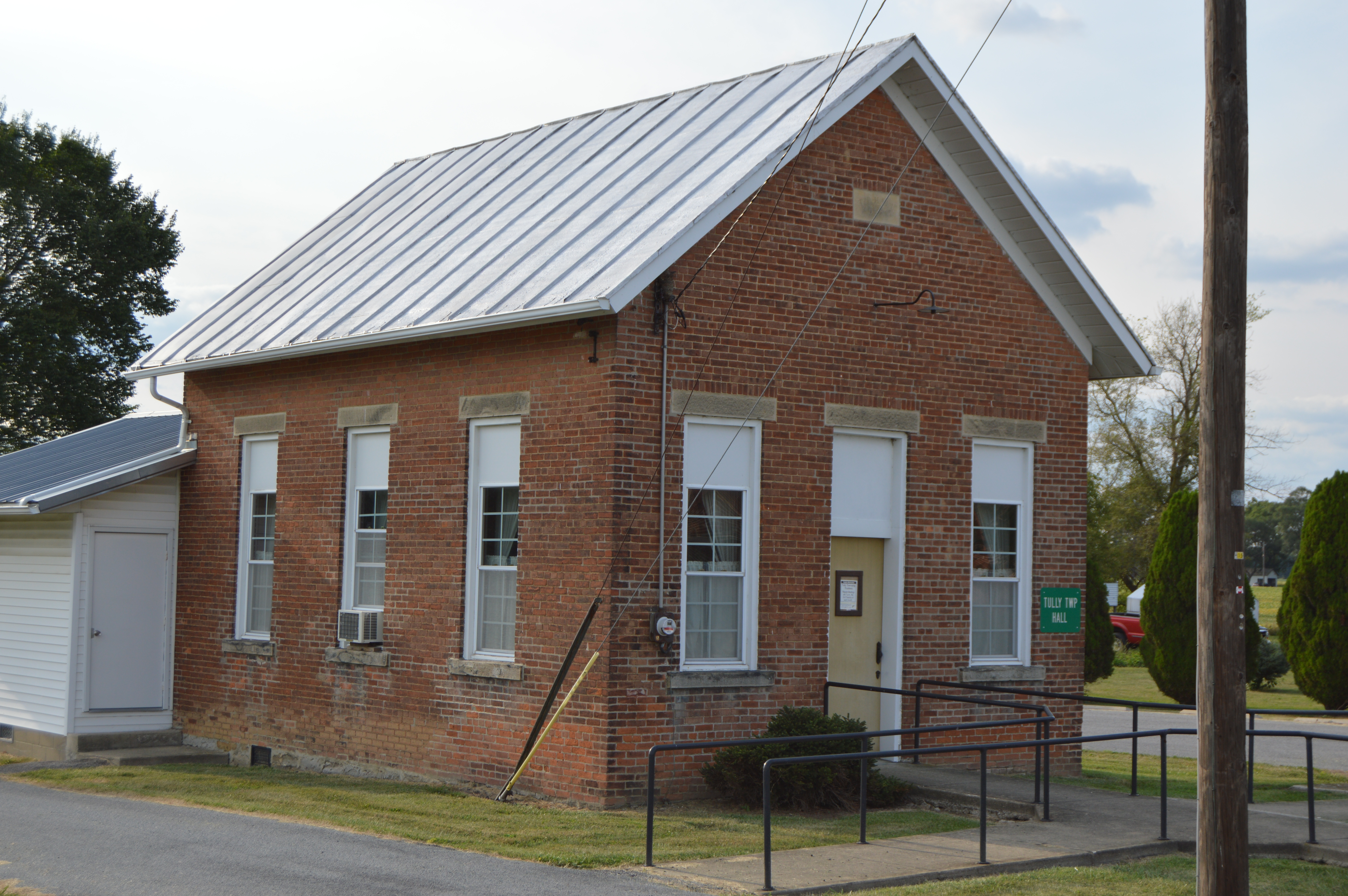
- Township hall at Martel

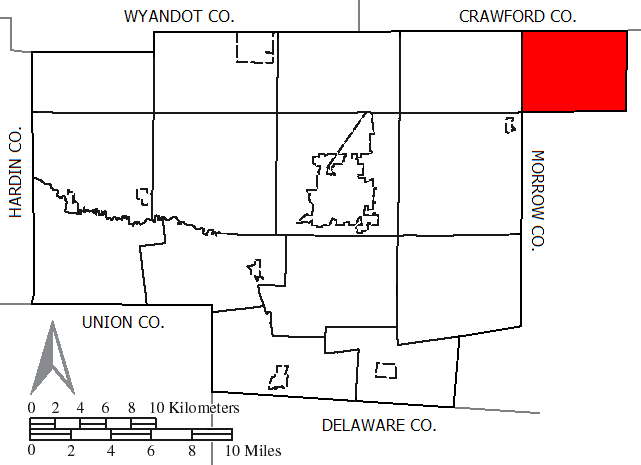
- Location of Tully Township in Marion County
- Coordinates: 40°40′27″N 82°54′19″W
- Country: United States
- State: Ohio
- County: Marion

Area
  - Total: 21.0 sq mi (54.5 km^{2})
  - Land: 21.0 sq mi (54.5 km^{2})
  - Water: 0 sq mi (0.0 km^{2})
- Elevation: 1,020 ft (311 m)

Population (2020)
  - Total: 834
  - Density: 39.6/sq mi (15.3/km^{2})
- Time zone: UTC-5 (Eastern (EST))
  - Summer (DST): UTC-4 (EDT)
- FIPS code: 39-77742
- GNIS feature ID: 1086587

Tully Township is one of the fifteen townships of Marion County, Ohio, United States. The 2020 census found 834 people in the township.

== Geography ==
Located in the northeastern corner of the county, it borders the following townships:

- Whetstone Township, Crawford County - north
- Washington Township, Morrow County - east
- Canaan Township, Morrow County - south
- Claridon Township - southwest corner
- Scott Township - west
- Dallas Township, Crawford County - northwest corner

No municipalities are located in Tully Township, although the unincorporated community of Martel lies in the center of the township.

== Name and history ==
Statewide, the only other Tully Township is located in Van Wert County.

== Government ==
The township is governed by a three-member board of trustees, who are elected in November of odd-numbered years to a four-year term beginning on the following January 1. Two are elected in the year after the presidential election and one is elected in the year before it. There is also an elected township fiscal officer, who serves a four-year term beginning on April 1 of the year after the election, which is held in November of the year before the presidential election. Vacancies in the fiscal officership or on the board of trustees are filled by the remaining trustees.
