= Polk Township, Crawford County, Ohio =

Township in Ohio, US

- Township
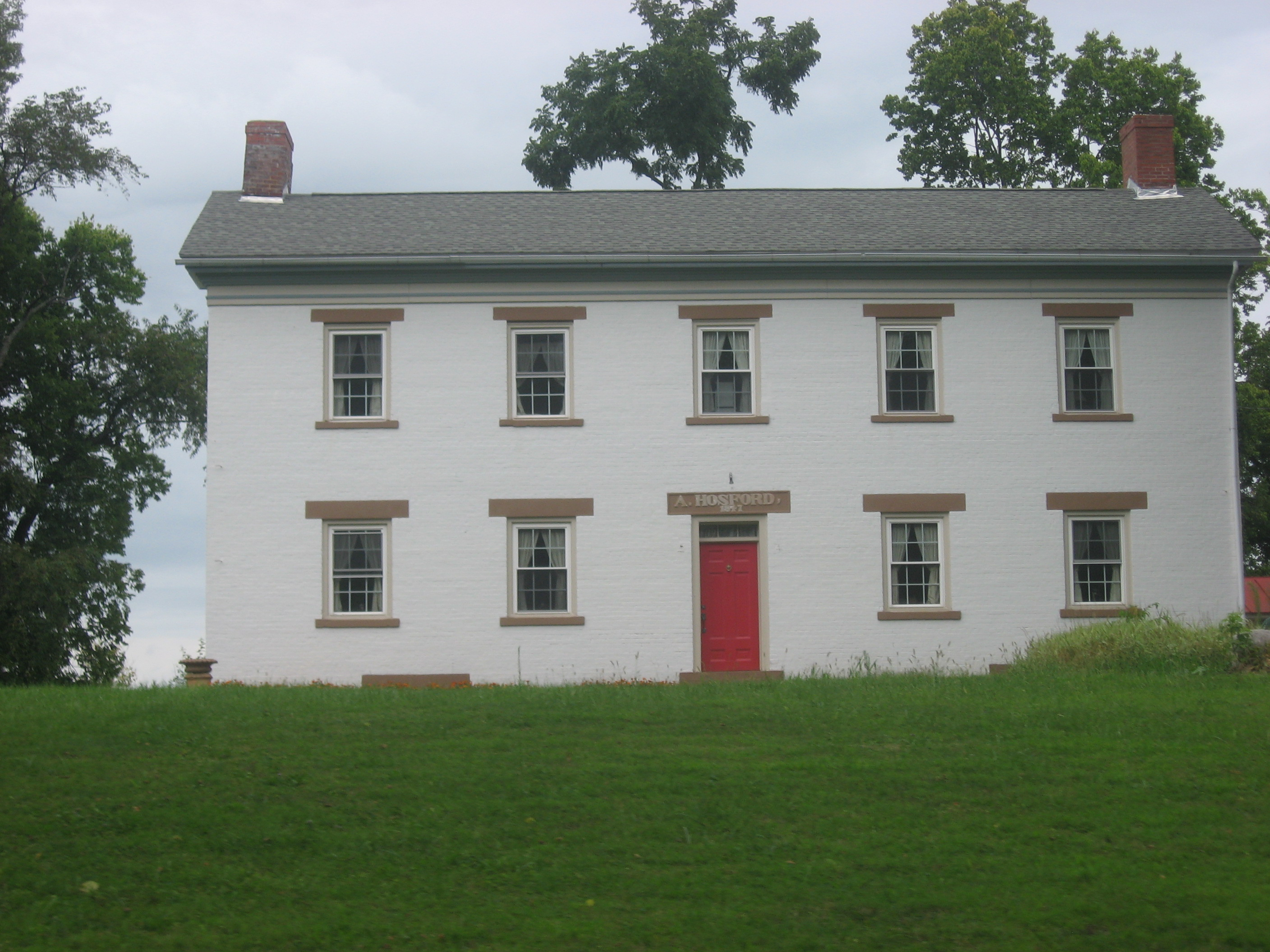
- Hosford House near Galion

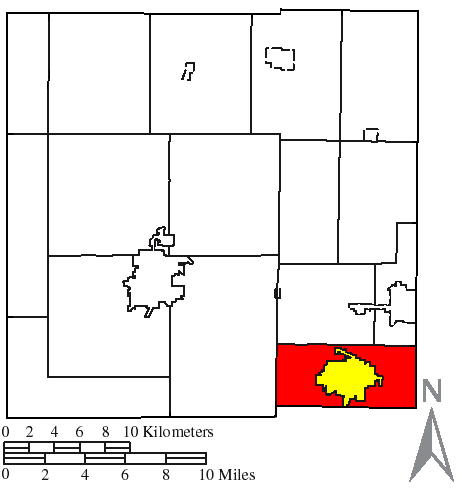
- Location of Polk Township (red) in Crawford County, next to the city of Galion (yellow)
- Coordinates: 40°43′18″N 82°48′12″W
- Country: United States
- State: Ohio
- County: Crawford

Area
  - Total: 14.1 sq mi (36.5 km^{2})
  - Land: 14.0 sq mi (36.3 km^{2})
  - Water: 0.077 sq mi (0.2 km^{2})
- Elevation: 1,150 ft (350 m)

Population (2020)
  - Total: 1,974
  - Density: 141/sq mi (54.4/km^{2})
- Time zone: UTC-5 (Eastern (EST))
  - Summer (DST): UTC-4 (EDT)
- FIPS code: 39-64010
- GNIS feature ID: 1085943
- Website: https://polktwp.net/

Polk Township is one of the sixteen townships of Crawford County, Ohio, United States. As of the 2020 census the population was 1,974.

== Geography ==
Located in the southeastern corner of the county, it borders the following townships:

- Jefferson Township - north
- Jackson Township - northeast
- Sandusky Township, Richland County - east
- North Bloomfield Township, Morrow County - southeast
- Washington Township, Morrow County - southwest
- Whetstone Township - west

The city of Galion is located in central Polk Township.

== Name and history ==
Polk Township was named for President James K. Polk.

It is the only Polk Township statewide.

== Government ==
The township is governed by a three-member board of trustees, who are elected in November of odd-numbered years to a four-year term beginning on the following January 1. Two are elected in the year after the presidential election and one is elected in the year before it. There is also an elected township fiscal officer, who serves a four-year term beginning on April 1 of the year after the election, which is held in November of the year before the presidential election. Vacancies in the fiscal officership or on the board of trustees are filled by the remaining trustees.
