= Jackson Township, Crawford County, Ohio =

Township in Ohio, US

- Township
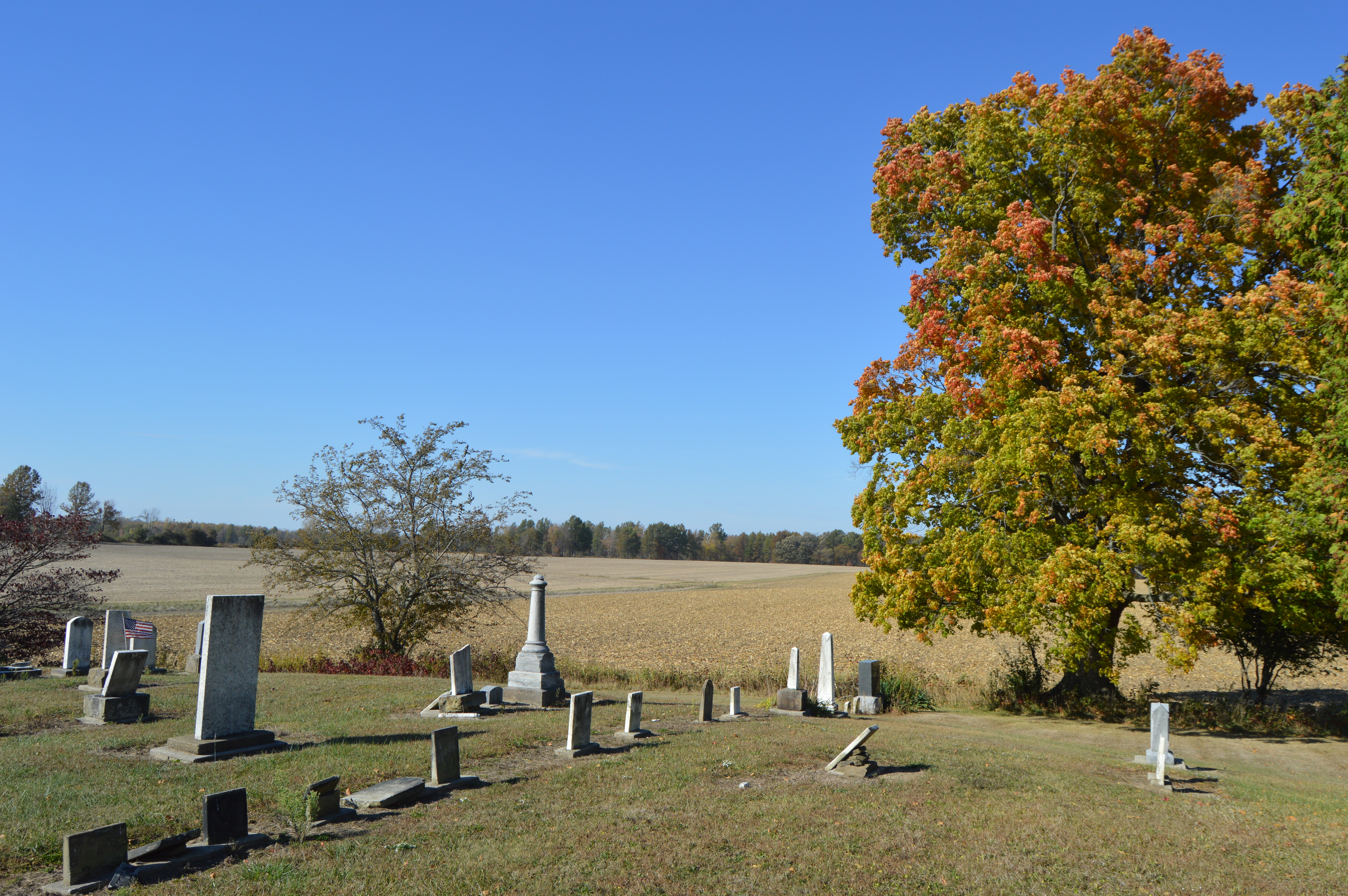
- Countryside southwest of Crestline

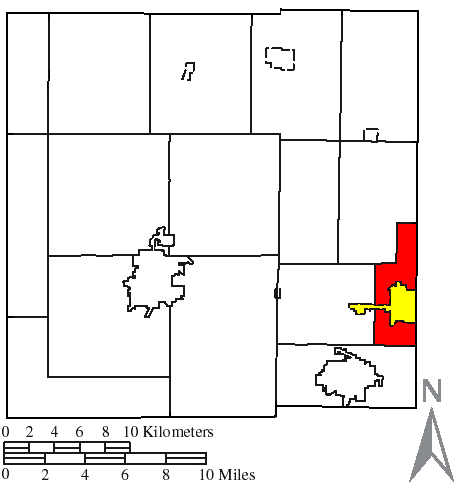
- Location of Jackson Township (red) in Crawford County, next to the city of Crestline (yellow)
- Coordinates: 40°47′13″N 82°44′25″W
- Country: United States
- State: Ohio
- County: Crawford

Area
  - Total: 7.6 sq mi (19.6 km^{2})
  - Land: 7.6 sq mi (19.6 km^{2})
  - Water: 0 sq mi (0.0 km^{2})
- Elevation: 1,152 ft (351 m)

Population (2020)
  - Total: 374
  - Density: 49.4/sq mi (19.1/km^{2})
- Time zone: UTC-5 (Eastern (EST))
  - Summer (DST): UTC-4 (EDT)
- FIPS code: 39-37744
- GNIS feature ID: 1085939

Jackson Township is one of the sixteen townships of Crawford County, Ohio, United States. As of the 2020 census the population of the township was 374.

== Geography ==
Located in the southeastern part of the county, it borders the following townships:

- Vernon Township - north
- Sharon Township, Richland County - northeast
- Sandusky Township, Richland County - southeast
- Polk Township - south
- Jefferson Township - west

Most of the village of Crestline is located in central Jackson Township.

== Name and history ==
Jackson Township was created in 1835. It was named for Andrew Jackson.

It is one of thirty-seven Jackson Townships statewide.

== Government ==
The township is governed by a three-member board of trustees, who are elected in November of odd-numbered years to a four-year term beginning on the following January 1. Two are elected in the year after the presidential election and one is elected in the year before it. There is also an elected township fiscal officer, who serves a four-year term beginning on April 1 of the year after the election, which is held in November of the year before the presidential election. Vacancies in the fiscal officership or on the board of trustees are filled by the remaining trustees.
