= Kirkpatrick, Ohio =

- Unincorporated community
- Kirkpatrick's location in Ohio Kirkpatrick (the United States)
- Coordinates: 40°41′19″N 83°00′31″W
- Country: United States
- State: Ohio
- County: Marion
- Township: Scott
- founded: 1832
- Founder: Marturen Latimbra
- Elevation: 1,007 ft (307 m)
- ZIP Code: 43302 (Marion)
- GNIS feature ID: 1064949

Kirkpatrick is an unincorporated community in northern Scott Township, Marion County, Ohio, United States. The ZIP code assigned to Kirkpatrick by the United States Postal Service is 43302 — the same as Marion. Kirkpatrick is the location of the Scott Township Hall. The current population of Kirkpatrick is less than 200. Kirkpatrick is served by Ridgedale Local School District.

== Geography ==
Kirkpatrick is located at the junction of State Route 98 and Morral-Kirkpatrick Road in Marion County, Ohio. Kirkpatrick is assigned to Range 15 of Scott Township according to the Congress Lands Survey of Ohio.

== History ==
Kirkpatrick was originally called Letimbreville, and under the latter name was platted in 1833.

== Schools ==
The community was once the location of the Scott Township Consolidated School, opened in 1920, which was better known as "Kirkpatrick". Because Scott Township was small in comparison to other local communities, the popular two- story English basement style with instruction rooms was halved, with plans to add the other four rooms at a future point. This resulted in the west facade being almost windowless above ground, yet having the front door to the building. Classrooms overlooked to the east view. The building offered grades 1-11 to students in Scott Township and students from portions of Dallas Township, Crawford County. After the completion of their eleventh grade year, the graduating "junior's" transferred to other accredited school systems and graduated from those school. The school closed in 1949, and students in the township were assigned to other neighboring districts including Marion City Schools, township systems operated by Tully, Claridon, and Grand Prairie Townships, and Mount Zion in Crawford County, Ohio. The school building, which was never completed as planned, was razed after the system closure, though its gym - which had been built as the township hall - remained into the late 1970s when it was superseded by a modern structure.
