= Dallas Township, Ohio =

Township in Ohio, US

- Township
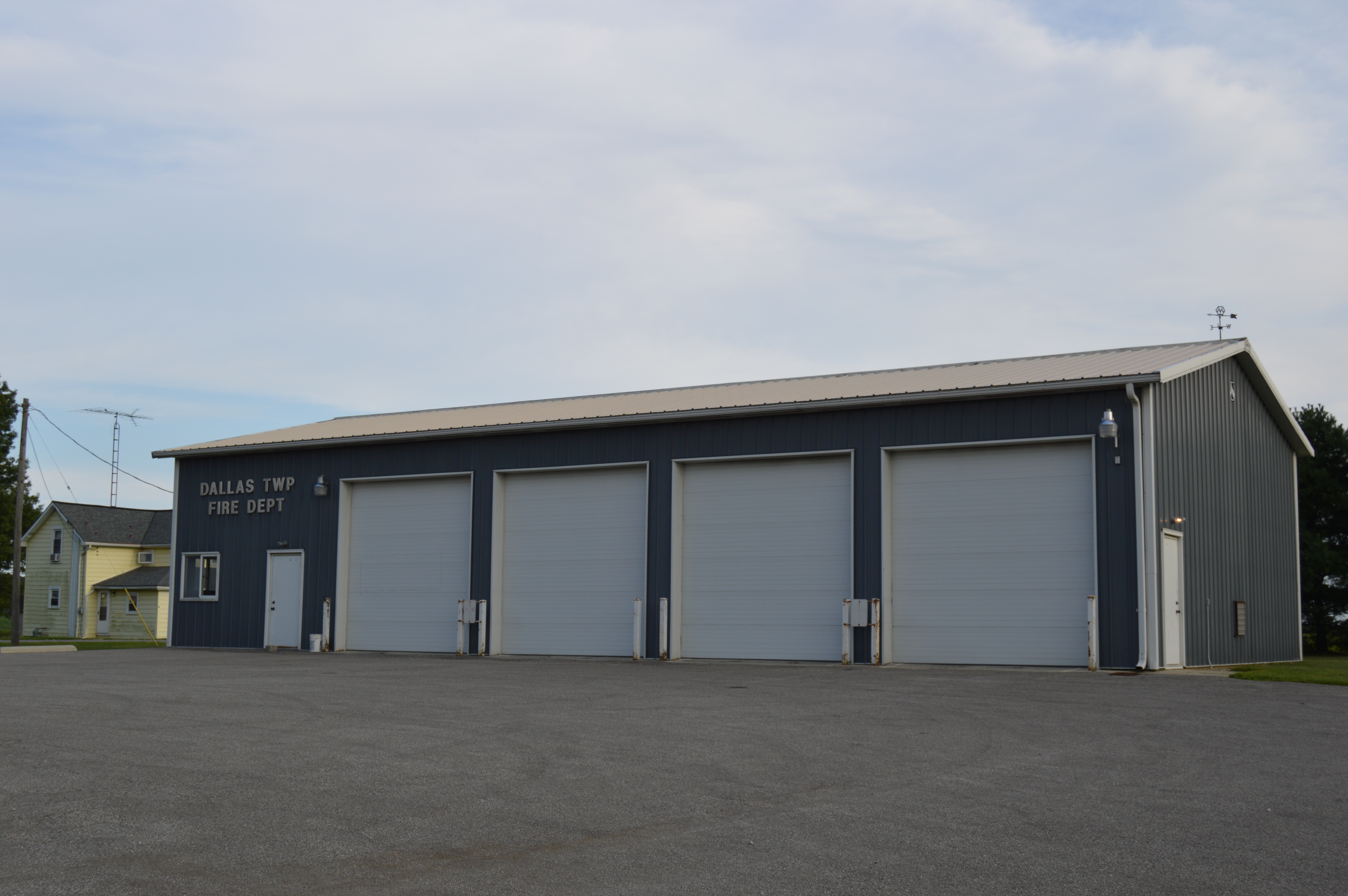
- Fire station in Monnett

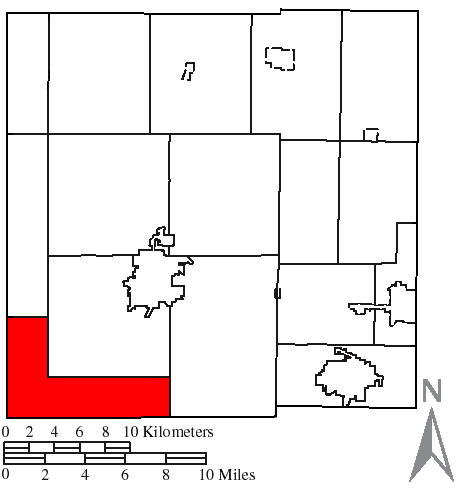
- Location of Dallas Township in Crawford County
- Coordinates: 40°43′12″N 83°3′3″W
- Country: United States
- State: Ohio
- County: Crawford

Area
  - Total: 22.1 sq mi (57.3 km^{2})
  - Land: 22.1 sq mi (57.3 km^{2})
  - Water: 0 sq mi (0.0 km^{2})
- Elevation: 971 ft (296 m)

Population (2020)
  - Total: 459
  - Density: 20.7/sq mi (8.01/km^{2})
- Time zone: UTC-5 (Eastern (EST))
  - Summer (DST): UTC-4 (EDT)
- FIPS code: 39-19932
- GNIS feature ID: 1085936

Dallas Township is one of the sixteen townships of Crawford County, Ohio, United States. As of the 2020 census the population was 459.

== Geography ==
Located in the southwestern corner of the county, it borders the following townships:

- Tod Township - north
- Bucyrus Township - northeast
- Whetstone Township - east
- Tully Township, Marion County - southeast corner
- Scott Township, Marion County - south
- Grand Prairie Township, Marion County - southwest
- Antrim Township, Wyandot County - west

No municipalities are located in Dallas Township.

== Name and history ==
Dallas Township was organized in 1845. It was named for George M. Dallas, a U.S. Senator from Pennsylvania.

It is the only Dallas Township statewide.

== Government ==
The township is governed by a three-member board of trustees, who are elected in November of odd-numbered years to a four-year term beginning on the following January 1. Two are elected in the year after the presidential election and one is elected in the year before it. There is also an elected township fiscal officer, who serves a four-year term beginning on April 1 of the year after the election, which is held in November of the year before the presidential election. Vacancies in the fiscal officership or on the board of trustees are filled by the remaining trustees.
