= Monnett, Ohio =

- Unincorporated community
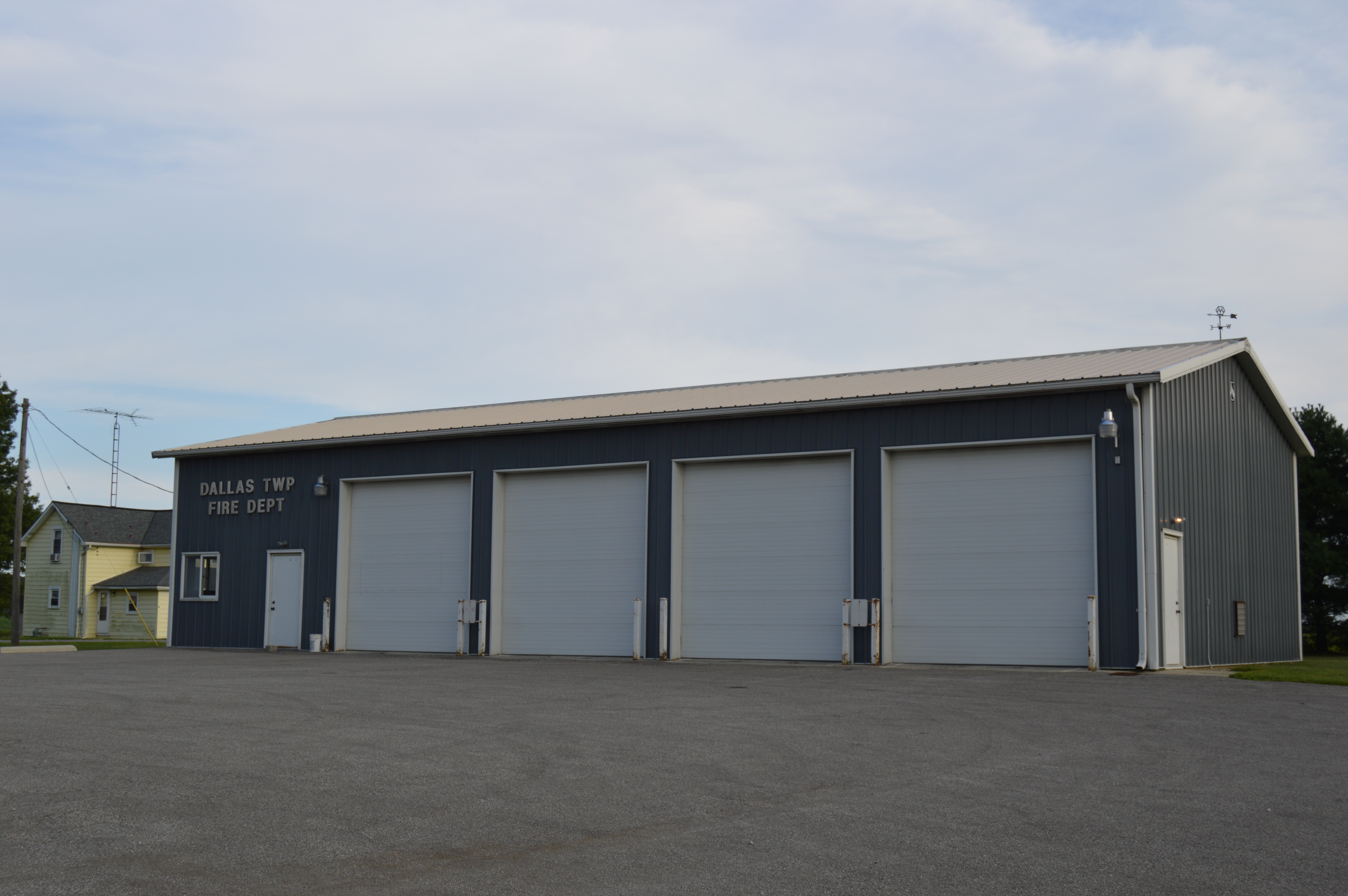
- Fire station on State Route 294

- Monnett's location in Ohio
- Coordinates: 40°43′03″N 83°02′24″W
- Country: United States
- State: Ohio
- County: Crawford County
- Township: Dallas
- founded: 1832
- Founder: Ephraim Monnett, Oliver Monnett, Mervin J. Monnette
- Elevation: 297 m (974 ft)

Population (June 2017)
  - Total: 45
- estimated
- ZIP Code: 43302
- GNIS feature ID: 1065045

Monnett is an unincorporated community in Dallas Township, Crawford County, Ohio, United States. The zipcode assigned to Monnett by the United States Postal Service is 43302, a Marion county zipcode, although Monnett is located inside Crawford County.The population of Monnett (located between both Monnett signs on SR 294) as of 2017 is roughly between 40-45 residents.

== History ==
Monnett was established as a livestock loading stop by brothers Ephraim, Oliver and Mervin J. Monnett (some sources list as Monnette after 1900) along the Toledo and Ohio Central Railway in the 1870s. The Monnett family was Crawford County's largest land owning family between 1860 and 1880, and their cattle shipments to Toledo and Chicago were large enough to make overland drives to Bucyrus impractical. The establishment of Monnett allowed them to ship directly from the heart of their holdings.

The community at one time was home to the Dallas Township School before it was consolidated with Mt. Zion School.The United States Postal Service once operated a Monnett substation for general mail delivery and outgoing mail. The community also provided local farmers with access to a general merchandise store through the early 20th century.

Dallas Township Volunteer Fire Department is located in the center of Monnett.

== Geography ==
Monnett is located on Monnett New Winchester Road, Ohio State Route 294, about mid way between OH State Rt. 4 and OH State Rt. 98.

== Notable person ==
- Orra E. Monnette, Co-founder of Bank of America
