= Scott Township, Marion County, Ohio =

Township in Ohio, US

- Township
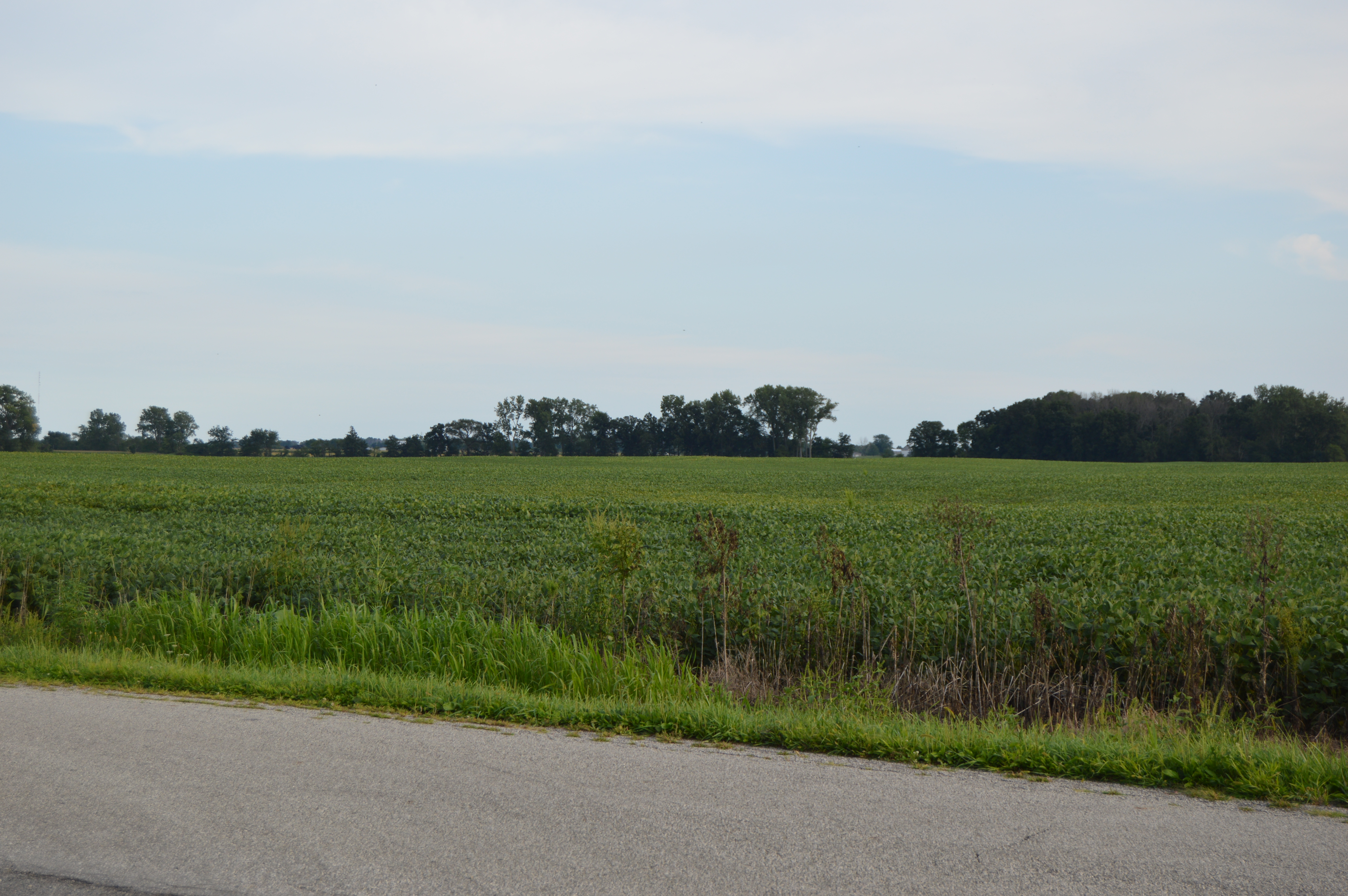
- Fields northwest of Kirkpatrick

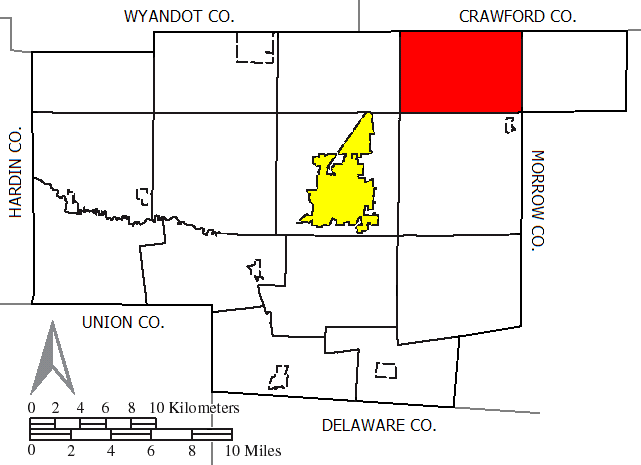
- Location of Scott Township in Marion County
- Coordinates: 40°39′47″N 83°0′32″W
- Country: United States
- State: Ohio
- County: Marion

Area
  - Total: 24.5 sq mi (63.4 km^{2})
  - Land: 24.5 sq mi (63.4 km^{2})
  - Water: 0 sq mi (0.0 km^{2})
- Elevation: 1,004 ft (306 m)

Population (2020)
  - Total: 571
  - Density: 23.3/sq mi (9.01/km^{2})
- Time zone: UTC-5 (Eastern (EST))
  - Summer (DST): UTC-4 (EDT)
- FIPS code: 39-71073
- GNIS feature ID: 1086586

Scott Township is one of the fifteen townships of Marion County, Ohio, United States. The 2020 census found 571 people in the township.

== Geography ==
Located in the northeastern part of the county, it borders the following townships:

- Dallas Township, Crawford County - north
- Whetstone Township, Crawford County - northeast corner
- Tully Township - east
- Canaan Township, Morrow County - southeast corner
- Claridon Township - south
- Marion Township - southwest corner
- Grand Prairie Township - west

No municipalities are located in Scott Township, although the unincorporated community of Kirkpatrick lies in the northern part of the township.

== Name and history ==
Statewide, other Scott Townships are located in Adams, Brown, and Sandusky counties.

== Government ==
The township is governed by a three-member board of trustees. These trustees are elected in November of odd-numbered years and serve four-year terms beginning on January 1 of the following year. Two trustees are elected the year after the presidential election, and one is elected the year before. Additionally, there is an elected township fiscal officer, who serves a four-year term starting on April 1 of the year after the election, which takes place in November of the year before the presidential election. Vacancies in either the fiscal officer position or on the board of trustees are filled by the remaining trustees.

Police protection for Scott Township is provided by the Marion County Sheriff’s Department.

== Education ==
Children in Scott Township attend one of two different school systems: those from the western part of the township attend the Ridgedale Local School District, while those from the eastern part attend the River Valley Local School District.
