= Grand Prairie Township, Marion County, Ohio =

Township in Ohio, US

- Township
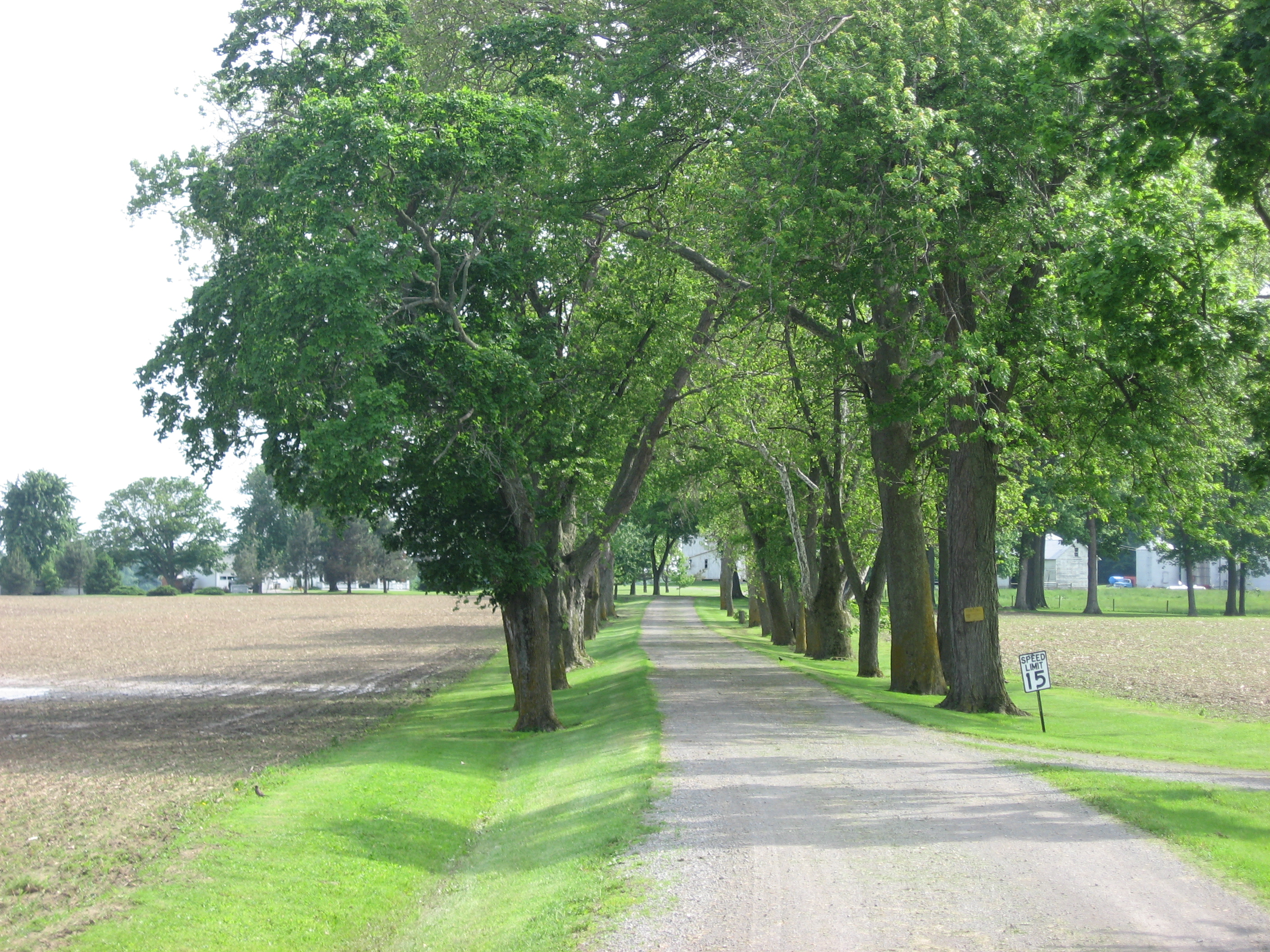
- Tree-lined farmstead driveway on Morral-Kirkpatrick Road

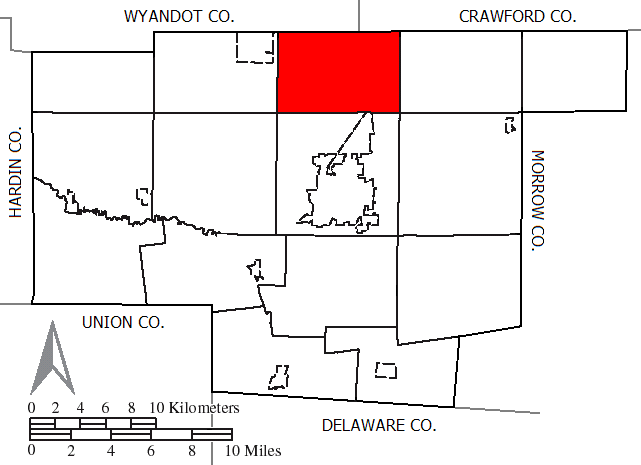
- Location of Grand Prairie Township in Marion County
- Coordinates: 40°40′16″N 83°6′39″W
- Country: United States
- State: Ohio
- County: Marion

Area
  - Total: 24.3 sq mi (62.9 km^{2})
  - Land: 24.2 sq mi (62.8 km^{2})
  - Water: 0 sq mi (0.0 km^{2})
- Elevation: 928 ft (283 m)

Population (2020)
  - Total: 1,586
  - Density: 65.4/sq mi (25.3/km^{2})
- Time zone: UTC-5 (Eastern (EST))
  - Summer (DST): UTC-4 (EDT)
- FIPS code: 39-31192
- GNIS feature ID: 1086578

Grand Prairie Township is one of the fifteen townships of Marion County, Ohio, United States. The 2020 census found 1,586 people in the township.

== Geography ==
Located in the northern part of the county, it borders the following townships:

- Antrim Township, Wyandot County - north
- Dallas Township, Crawford County - northeast
- Scott Township - east
- Claridon Township - southeast corner
- Marion Township - south
- Big Island Township - southwest corner
- Salt Rock Township - west
- Pitt Township, Wyandot County - northwest corner

No municipalities are located in Grand Prairie Township, although there is the unincorporated community of Brush Ridge.

== Name and history ==
It is the only Grand Prairie Township statewide.

== Government ==
The township is governed by a three-member board of trustees, who are elected in November of odd-numbered years to a four-year term beginning on the following January 1. Two are elected in the year after the presidential election and one is elected in the year before it. There is also an elected township fiscal officer, who serves a four-year term beginning on April 1 of the year after the election, which is held in November of the year before the presidential election. Vacancies in the fiscal officership or on the board of trustees are filled by the remaining trustees.
