= Olentangy West (Columbus, Ohio) =

- Neighborhood in Columbus
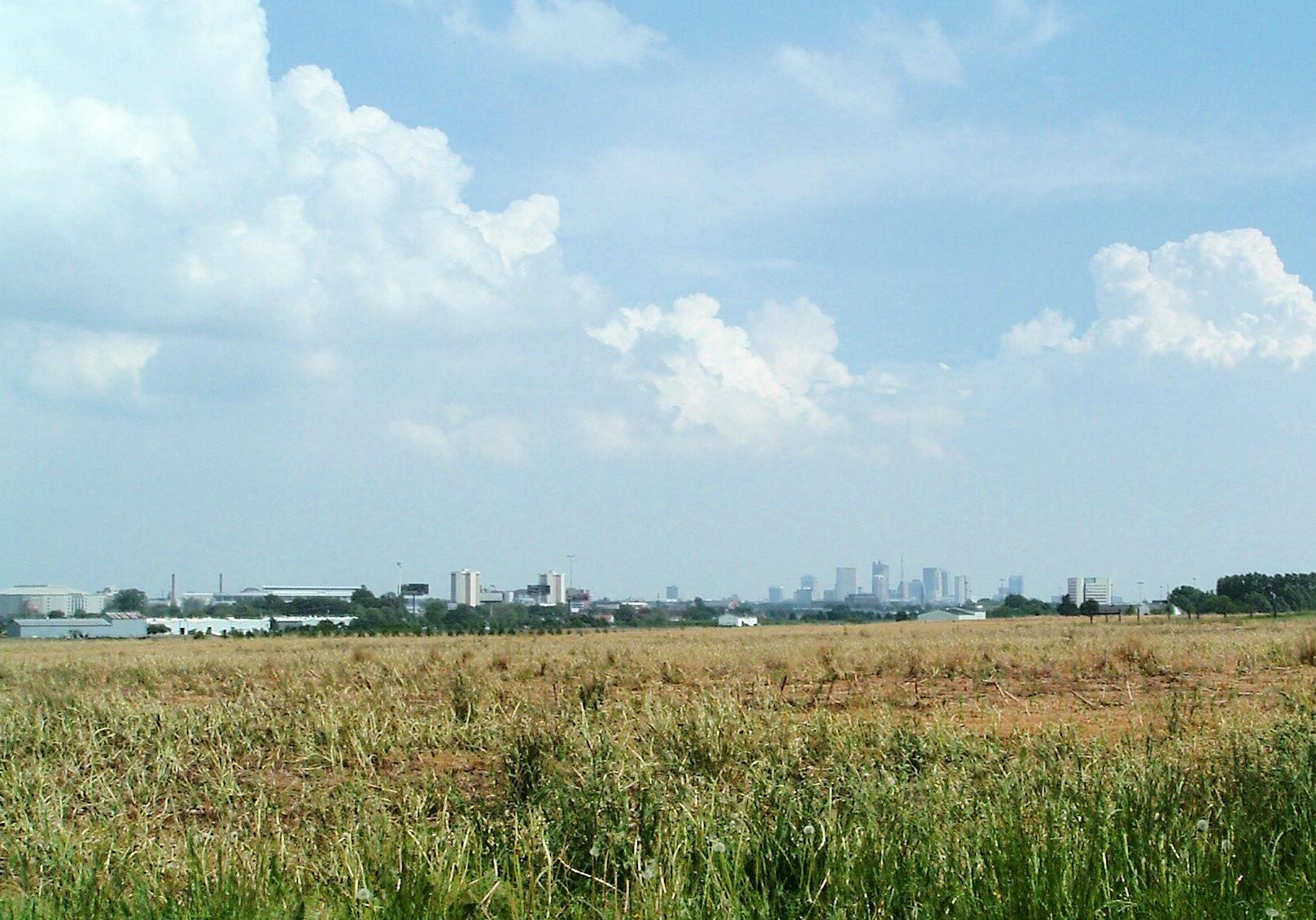
- Skyline of Columbus and Ohio State from Olentangy West
- Interactive map of the neighborhood
- Coordinates: 40.02952°N 83.03943°W
- Country: United States
- State: Ohio
- County: Franklin
- City: Columbus
- Settled: 1806

Area
  - Total: 5 sq mi (13 km^{2})
- Elevation: 800 ft (240 m)

Population (2010)
  - Total: 11,765
- Time zone: UTC-5 (EST)
  - Summer (DST): UTC-4 (EDT)
- ZIP Codes: 43202, 43214, 43220, 43221
- Area code: 614

Olentangy West is a neighborhood approximately 5 miles (8 km) northwest of downtown Columbus, Ohio, United States. Also called West Olentangy, it is generally bordered by West Henderson Road on the north, the Olentangy River and Clintonville on the east, Kinnear Road on the south, and Upper Arlington on the west. The area is primarily residential, although the large Riverside Methodist Hospital and the headquarters for Chemical Abstracts Service are located within its boundaries. Additionally, the west campus of Ohio State University is located within the southern boundary of the area.

== History ==
The area that makes up Olentangy West was originally designated as part of the United States Military Lands. This area was set aside as payment for soldiers who served in the American Revolutionary War. Shortly after Franklin County was established, the area became part of Clinton and Perry Townships. Simon and Alexander Shattuck were major landholders in the area, having moved to Ohio from Groton, Massachusetts. They farmed the land and established a settlement called "Shattucksburg" near the current site of the Marburn subdivision. A small schoolhouse was built nearby in 1856, which was later converted to a private residence. Union Cemetery was established in 1847, having previously been used as a burial site for the Hess family, and is now one of the largest cemeteries in Columbus.

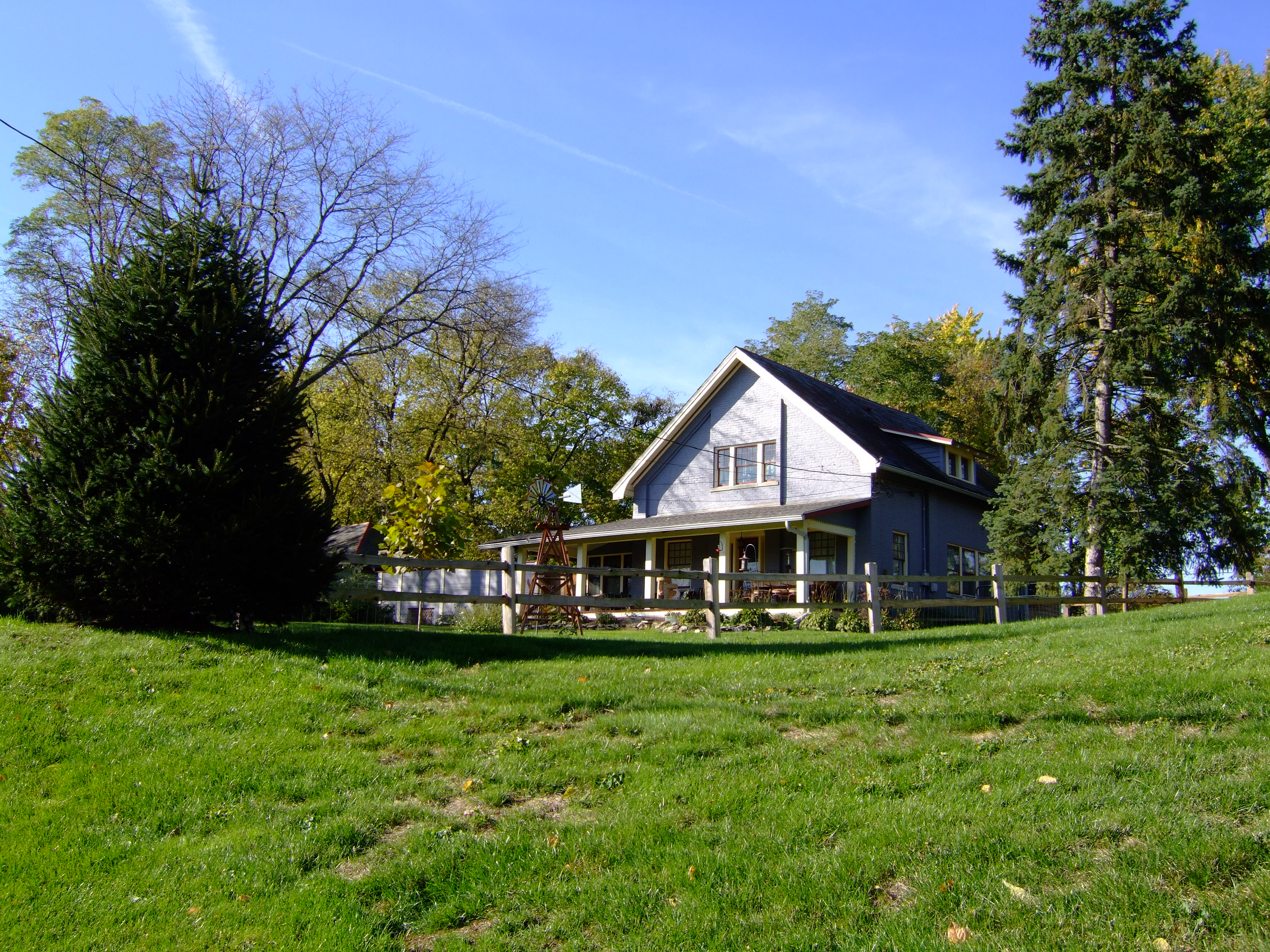
1856 Schoolhouse located on Olentangy River Road, now a private residence.

Olentangy River Road was constructed in 1828 and connected the area to Franklinton and Delaware. The railroad came to the area in 1876 with the completion of the Columbus and Toledo Railroad. This track is still in service today as a freight line operated by CSX. In 1939, a bridge was built across the Olentangy River that extended North Broadway from High Street to Olentangy River Road.

In the late 1940s, John D. Kraus set up OSU's first Radio telescope in the west campus farm fields next to Ackerman Run. This was the first iteration of what would later be called the Big Ear. However, when more space was needed for an expansion, the project moved adjacent to Perkins Observatory in Delaware in 1961. Though the site has long since been abandoned, the ruins of the original control building and the antenna footings remain.

Urban development in the area began in earnest in the 1950s, as the city of Columbus grew outward and baby boomers desired new houses away from the crowded conditions of the inner city. Olentangy River Road was expanded from two to four lanes north of Ackerman in 1956, and the University City Shopping Center was built in 1961, catering to the new families in the area as well as those in Clintonville and Old North Columbus. As the area grew, traffic congestion became a major problem, particularly on Olentangy River Road as residents commuted to jobs at Ohio State campus and Downtown Columbus. A new freeway called the Olentangy Freeway - later designated State Route 315 - was proposed by city and state officials in the early 1960s.

Many problems were encountered during the process to determine the route. Officials at the Ohio State University objected to the new road running through parts of campus and causing disruption to the students and faculty. This resulted in the route being shifted west to run adjacent to the Chesapeake and Ohio Railway tracks where it approaches the campus from the south. The reconfigured route required highway officials to purchase and remove a commercial building, part of the University City subdivision, and an undeveloped part of Union Cemetery. However, the owners of the Cemetery strongly objected to having their property taken for the realignment to bypass OSU. The Cemetery obtained a permanent injunction in 1967 to prevent construction through its land and suggested a tunnel under the property be built instead. The Ohio legislature then passed a bill to mend a statue and allow the right of way to be purchased for the freeway to pass through the cemetery property. Many homeowners further north also objected to having the freeway run near the river and ruining the scenic nature of the area, as well as expressing concern about safety problems from heavy fog that sometimes forms in the valley. As a compromise, state officials proposed purchasing and developing land in the area for parks. The section between Kinnear Road and Ackerman road was opened on August 7, 1972 after more than a decade of wrangling. The impasse with Union Cemetery was resolved in 1975. However, due to the years of delays, construction costs for the section through the cemetery came in higher than the original projections for the entire freeway from downtown to Worthington. The freeway route through the cemetery was completed in 1975 and the entire freeway between downtown and Interstate 270 was completed in 1980.

In recent years, the area has become prized for being a centrally located yet quiet and easygoing place to live. In particular, the areas west of Route 315 are regarded as very safe and desirable neighborhoods.

== Demographics ==
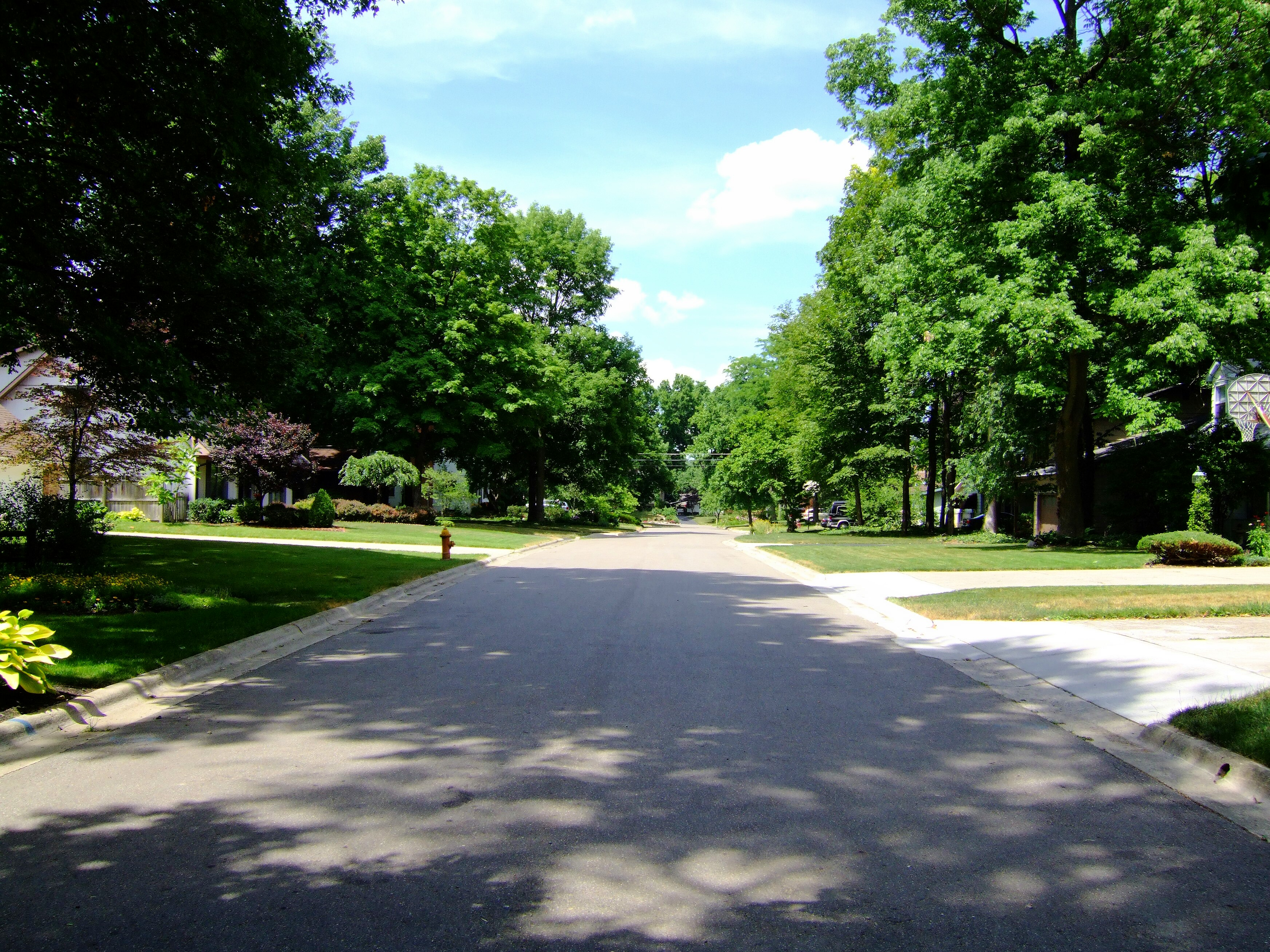
Typical neighborhood street in Olentangy West

As of the 2010 census, there were 11,765 residents and 5,917 households in the area. The racial makeup of the community was 72.06% White, 17.8% Asian, 6.0% Black, and 4.12% from other races or two or more races. The average household size is 1.99 persons, and the area has a relatively low vacancy rate of 6%. With the Ohio State campus nearby, a number of students live in Olentangy West, particularly graduate and professional students. The Buckeye Village student family housing area is home to many international students, with approximately 85% of residents in the complex foreign born. Renters make up 58% of the overall population while 42% are homeowners. However, within the subdivisions approximately 90% of houses are owner occupied.

As of the 2000 census, approximately 95% of residents had attained a high school diploma or higher and 50% had attained a bachelor's degree or higher. Median family income in 2000 was approximately $58,200 ($79,330 in 2015 dollars).

== Education ==
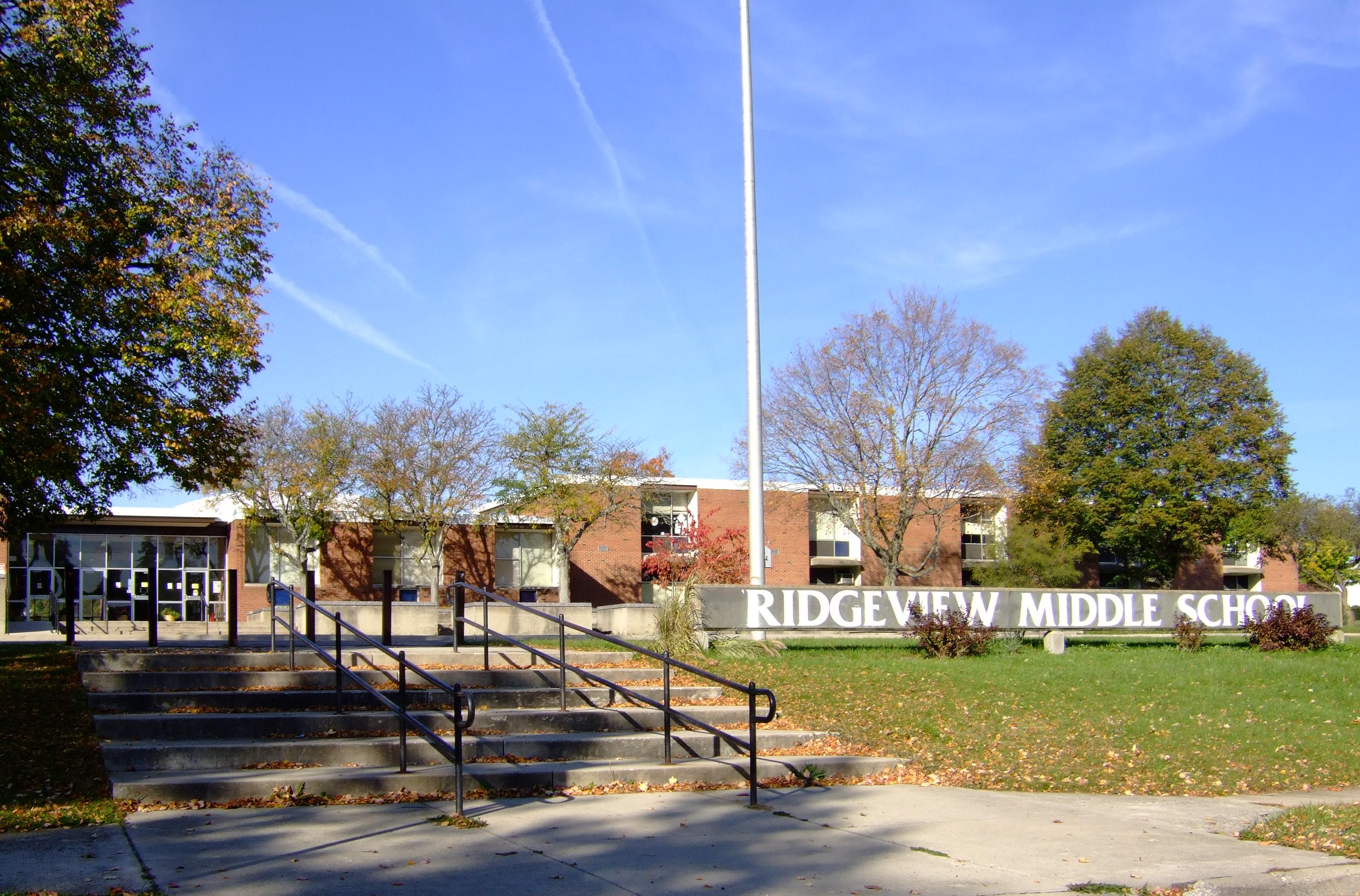
Ridgeview Middle School

Pre-kindergarten schools in Olentangy West include Arlington Children's Center, Bright Horizons, Early Childhood Learning Center, OSU Childcare Center, and Riverside Learning Center. There are numerous public and private K-12 schools in the area as well. Public elementary schools include Cranbrook and Winterset Elementary schools in the Cranbrook and Knolls-West subdivisions respectively. In addition, Ecolé Kenwood (a French immersion school) is a Magnet school with enrollment via lottery that serves grades K-8 and is located in Greenfield Estates. In the Knolls subdivision, Ridgeview Middle school serves students in grades 6-8. Just to the north of Olentangy West, Centennial High School serves all students in the area in grades 9-12 and is recognized as one of the top High Schools in the United States by U.S. News & World Report. Additionally, semi-public The Metro School is located in the southern portion of the area on Ohio State's west campus. Private schools include St. Timothy School, a Catholic school.

== Economy ==
Approximately 25,000 people work in Olentangy West, with approximately 16,000 working in the health care sector due to the presence of Riverside Hospital. Retail trade is the next largest industry, with approximately 2,000 workers. The area was formerly home to a major branch of Swiss firm ABB Group. In 2002, the company elected to move to another located during restructuring, and the 500,000 square feet (46,000 m^{2}) complex on Ackerman Road was promptly bought by the Ohio State University for much needed office and laboratory space. The headquarters of Commerce National Bank are also located in Olentangy West, adjacent to Route 315. The Ohio Supercomputer Center is located in the far southern part of the area.

== Neighborhoods ==
Olentangy West is divided into several official and unofficial subareas. They include:

- Riverview - The area bounded by the Ohio State Campus on the south, State Route 315 on the west, North Broadway on the north, and the Olentangy River on the west, this is the most populous subarea with 3,896 people as of 2000. It includes the University City Shopping Center.
- Cranbrook - The reverse L-shaped area bounded by Ackerman Road on the south, the Upper Arlington border on the west, North Broadway on the north, and State Route 315 on the east, this area encompasses the subdivisions of Shady Hill Estates, Kenny Heights, University City (west), Cranford, and the namesake Cranbrook subdivision.
- Brentwood Park - The area bounded by North Broadway on the south, the Upper Arlington border on the west, Highland Drive on the north, and the CSX right of way on the east, this area includes Greenfield Estates as well as the namesake Brentwood Park subdivisions.
- Kendale - The area bounded by Highland Drive on the south, the Upper Arlington Border on the west, commercial and multifamily property along Folkstone Road on the north, and the CSX right of way on the east, this area includes only its namesake subdivision.
- Knolls Thomas - The area bounded by Riverside Hospital on the south, the CSX right of way on the west, Henderson Road on the north, and State Route 315 on the east, this area includes the historic Marburn subdivision, Beautyview, and namesake Knolls and Thomas subdivisions.
- Knolls West - The area bounded by the Upper Arlington Border on the south and west, Henderson Road on the north, and the CSX right of way on the east, this area includes the Kenny Centre shopping center as well as its namesake Knolls West subdivision.
- Shattucksburg - The area bounded by Mobile Drive, Old Henderson Road, the CSX Railroad, and Kendale, it is a ghost neighborhood of Columbus. Once a residential neighborhood from the 1930s, it has since been turned into businesses, warehouses, and industries. Well-ignored by most.

== Transportation ==
The area is easily accessed by car via State Route 315 along with many other major roads including North Broadway, Kenny Road, Olentangy River Road, and Henderson Road. COTA provides extensive bus service to the area via routes 1, 32, 33, and 72. Additionally, OSU's Campus Area Bus Service (CABS) provides free bus service between the University City, Shady Hill Estates, and Cranbrook subdivisions and OSU's central campus via a stop at Kenny & Ackerman Roads.

Bicycling infrastructure includes the Olentangy Trail which runs along the eastern edge of the Olentangy River. It is accessible via the footbridge between the Knolls subdivision and Whetstone Park, by crossing North Broadway to Milton Road, or via Dodridge Street. Additionally, a multi-use trail was completed in 2014 along Henderson Road, as well as a similar trail along Olentangy River Road between North Broadway and Ackerman which finished construction in early 2015.

== Media ==
The area is served by the weekly Northwest News, published by ThisWeek Community News which is a subsidiary of the Dispatch Media Group. The studios for WOSU-FM, WOSA, and WOSU-TV are located in the Fawcett Center in the southern part of the district on Olentangy River Road, along with WOSU-FM's broadcast tower on Dodridge Street. Television station WCMH-TV has its main broadcast studio on Olentangy River Road as well.

== Parks and Open Space ==
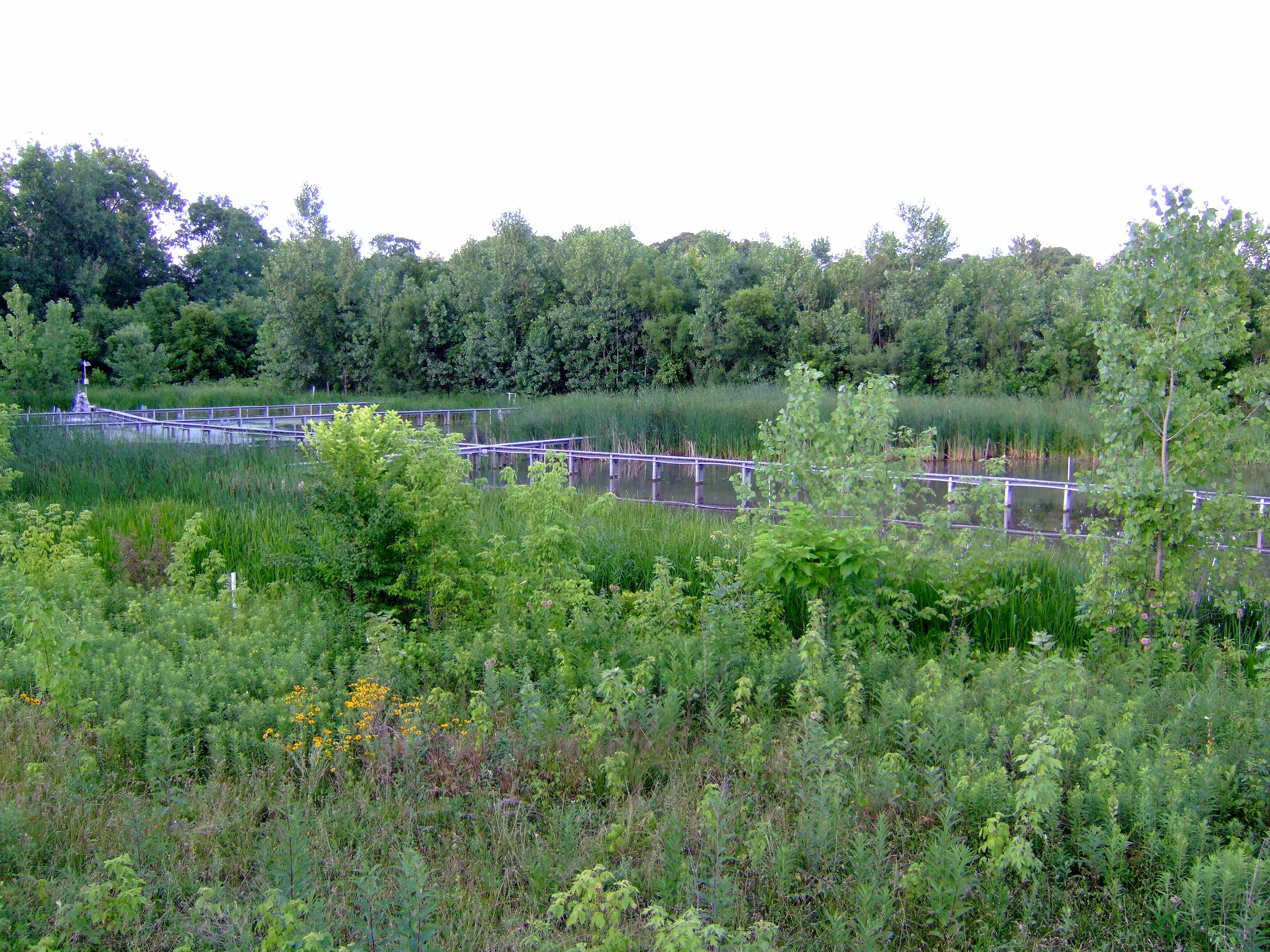
Schiermeier Research Wetlands

The largest open space is the area of Ohio State's west campus, which includes the Waterman Agricultural and Natural Resources Laboratory adjacent to Kenny Road. The outdoor laboratory includes a working dairy farm with grade A fluid milk production, horticulture, crop science, turf grass, forestry, wetlands, floriculture, and apiculture. The 60 acres (24 ha) Chadwick Arboretum is located on the southern end of the area on Ohio State's Agriculture Campus. Parks in the area include Fred Beekman park, the Wilma H. Schiermeier Olentangy River Wetland Research Park, Whetstone Park (including the Park of Roses), Northcrest Park, Anheuser Busch Sports Park, and Clinton-Como Park. The open space of Union Cemetery is often visited by birdwatching groups, as it attracts a variety of bird species to the grounds.
