= Vernon Township, Crawford County, Ohio =

Township in Ohio

- Township
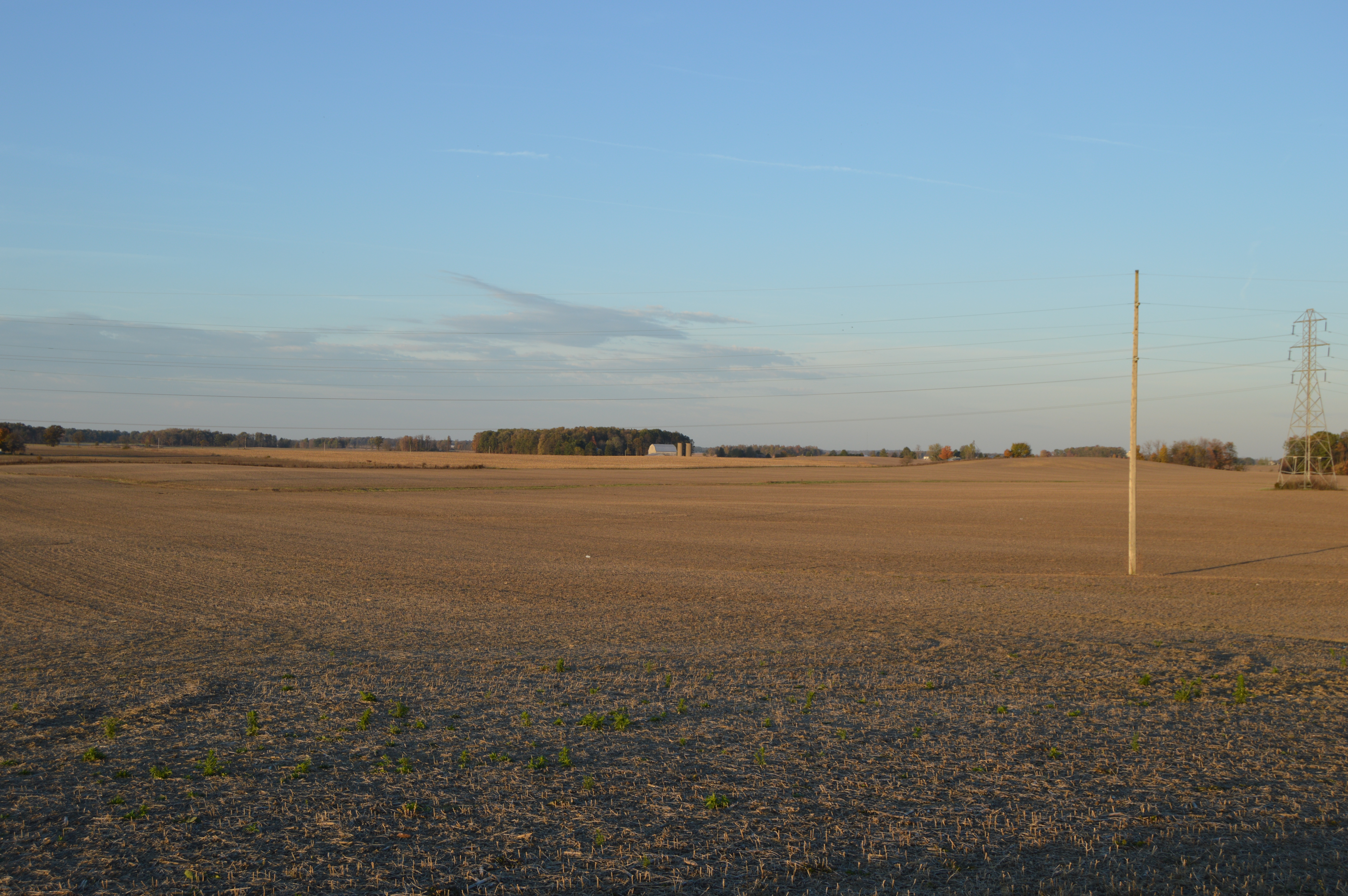
- Fields southeast of Tiro

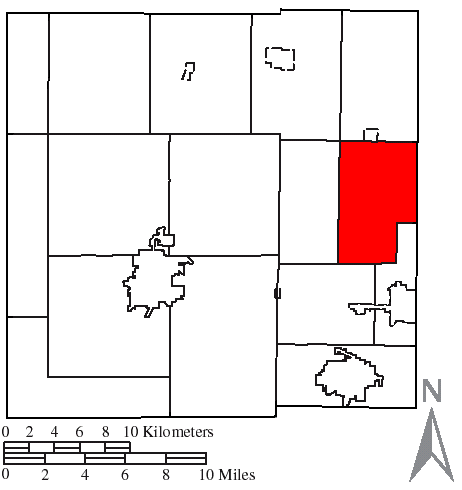
- Location of Vernon Township in Crawford County
- Coordinates: 40°51′49″N 82°46′13″W
- Country: United States
- State: Ohio
- County: Crawford

Area
  - Total: 21.48 sq mi (55.64 km^{2})
  - Land: 21.48 sq mi (55.63 km^{2})
  - Water: 0.0039 sq mi (0.01 km^{2})
- Elevation: 1,119 ft (341 m)

Population (2020)
  - Total: 740
  - Density: 34/sq mi (13/km^{2})
- Time zone: UTC-5 (Eastern (EST))
  - Summer (DST): UTC-4 (EDT)
- FIPS code: 39-79786
- GNIS feature ID: 1085947

Vernon Township is one of the sixteen townships of Crawford County, Ohio. As of the 2020 census the population was 740.

== Geography ==
Located in the eastern part of the county, it borders the following townships:

- Auburn Township - north
- Plymouth Township, Richland County - northeast corner
- Sharon Township, Richland County - east
- Jackson Township - southeast
- Jefferson Township - southwest
- Sandusky Township - west
- Cranberry Township - northwest corner

No municipalities are located in Vernon Township, but it does contain the unincorporated communities of DeKalb and West Liberty.

== Name and history ==
Vernon Township was established in 1825.

Statewide, other Vernon Townships are located in Clinton and Trumbull counties.

== Government ==
The township is governed by a three-member board of trustees, who are elected in November of odd-numbered years to a four-year term beginning on the following January 1. Two are elected in the year after the presidential election and one is elected in the year before it. There is also an elected township fiscal officer, who serves a four-year term beginning on April 1 of the year after the election, which is held in November of the year before the presidential election. Vacancies in the fiscal officership or on the board of trustees are filled by the remaining trustees.
