= Crawford County Courthouse (Ohio) =

Local government building in the United States

- Bucyrus Commercial Historic District
- U.S. Historic district – Contributing property
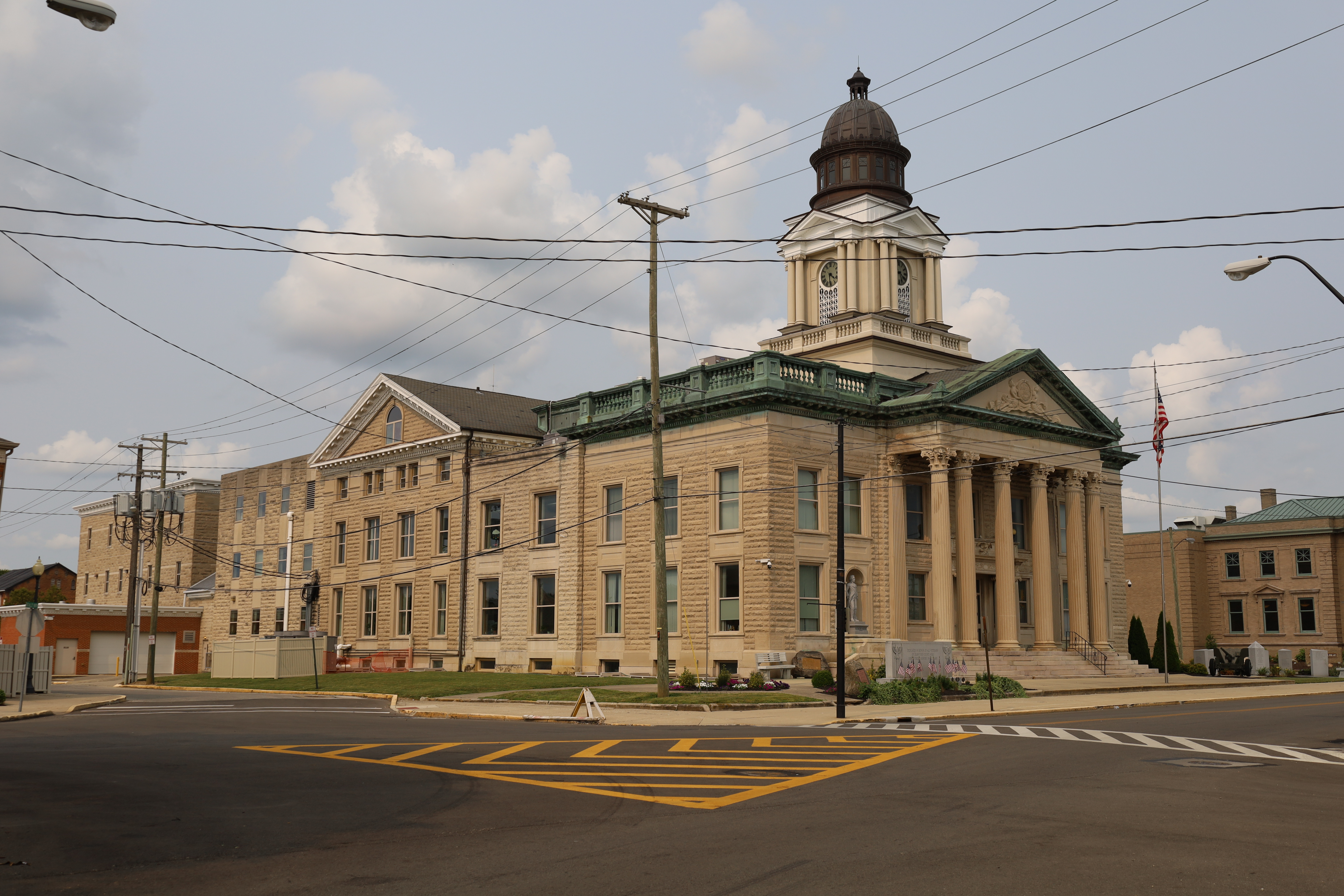
- The courthouse in 2023

- Location within Ohio Location within the United States
- Interactive map showing the location of Crawford County Courthouse
- Location: 112 E. Mansfield St., Bucyrus, Ohio
- Coordinates: 40°48′30″N 82°58′29″W
- Built: 1830
- Architect: Harlan Jones
- Part of: Bucyrus Commercial Historic District (ID85000401)
- Added to NRHP: February 28, 1985

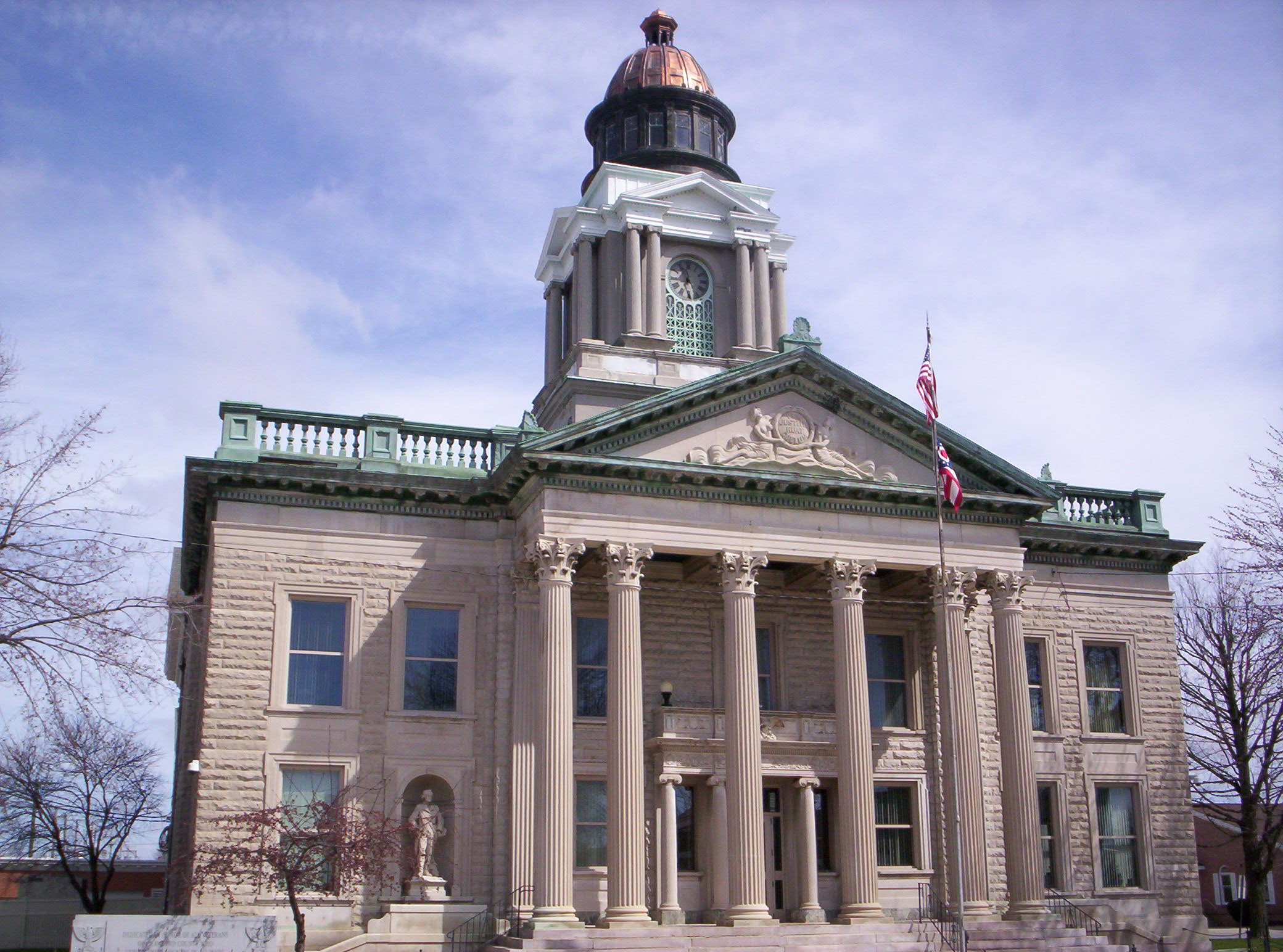
The courthouse in 2009

The Courthouse of Crawford County, Ohio, is a landmark of the county seat, Bucyrus, Ohio. The courthouse was built in 1854 on East Mansfield Street by architect Harlan Jones and was added to the National Register of Historic Places on 1985-02-28 as a part of the Bucyrus Commercial Historic District.

== History ==
Crawford County was established in 1820 but the issue of a county seat was not resolved for 10 years. The county was divided between the northern population, favoring Crawford and the southern citizens who favored Bucyrus. The first county building, the jailhouse was built in 1827. The issues dragged on until the election of 1830, when the commissioners selected Bucyrus to be the temporary county seat. During much exhausting campaigning, it was decided to allow the county seat to remain in Bucyrus.

The first courthouse was designed by Colonel James Kilbourne and was completed in 1832 and accepted by the county in 1833. The two-story brick building resembled the Ohio Statehouse with a flat roof and a central cupola. The entire facade was painted white to give it a more stately appearance. During construction a scaffolding collapsed killing two workers, the names of which are located in the location of their death. In 1837 the decision was made to place a bell in the cupola and the county purchased on for $100.

As the construction on the courthouse was finishing, the old county jail of 1827 burned down. The county did have enough funds to construct a new one and this project was placed on hold until 1839. The new jailhouse was located close to the courthouse. The soft brick used in construction allowed many prisoners to escape which led to the whole block being surrounded by a solid board fence.

The needs of the county were met until it was decided that a new courthouse was needed in the 1850s. The county chose the Greek Revival plans drafted by O.S. Kinney from Cleveland. The red-brick building stood two stories tall and was topped by a cupola of white oak which housed a 1,500-pound cast-iron bell. On either side of the tower was a clock face, added in 1892. In 1895 a new bell was purchased and hung in the old tower. The front of the building contained a central door reached by a flight of stairs and framed by four wooden Doric columns.

The county was again in need of more room and decided on expanding the brick structure already standing. The idea was made to surround the brick building and to fix the weak points by remodeling them. The architect hired for this remodel was Harlan Jones of Mansfield. Extra room was provided by wings and in 1906 to 1908 a new stone-clad exterior was placed over the original brick front facade and the wooden columns were replaced with stone. A front portion was added and included a new courtroom. The roof was reinforced, and a dome was added. The dome was placed over the courtroom for extra light and was made by Bryant Art Glass of Columbus.

== Exterior ==
The courthouse contains three floors and is made up of rusticated sandstone blocks. The bottom floor is partially underground and contains small square windows. The second and third floor windows are large rectangular windows, with the second floor windows capped by stone head casings.

The main entrance is located in a projected portico reached by a flight of steps. Six Corinthian columns support the entablature and pediment above. The doors are surmounted by a transom and sidelights with Ionic columns supporting a false balcony above.

The roof is surrounded by a balustrade with a central drum rising to an entablature. The tower continues to a four-faced clock with decorative iron-work, four Ionic columns support a pedimented roof. A circular drum with large rectangular windows rise to a dome, which in turn supports a small lantern.
