= New Haven, Huron County, Ohio =

New Haven, Ohio
- Census-designated place
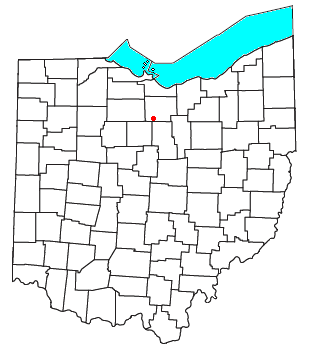
- Location in Ohio
- Coordinates: 41°01′50″N 82°40′53″W
- Country: United States
- State: Ohio
- County: Huron
- Township: New Haven

Area
  - Total: 1.24 sq mi (3.21 km^{2})
  - Land: 1.24 sq mi (3.20 km^{2})
  - Water: 0.0039 sq mi (0.01 km^{2})
- Elevation: 932 ft (284 m)

Population (2020)
  - Total: 356
  - Density: 288.0/sq mi (111.21/km^{2})
- Time zone: UTC-5 (Eastern (EST))
  - Summer (DST): UTC-4 (EDT)
- ZIP code: 44850
- Area code: 419
- FIPS code: 39-54698
- GNIS feature ID: 2628941

New Haven is an unincorporated community and census-designated place (CDP) in central New Haven Township, Huron County, Ohio, United States. As of the 2020 census the population was 356. It has a post office with the ZIP code 44850. It lies at the intersection of U.S. Route 224 with State Routes 61 and 598.

== History ==
New Haven was laid out and platted in 1815. Like many other towns in the Firelands region of Ohio that was settled by former residents of New England who fled the region during the American Revolutionary War, New Haven is named for the Connecticut city of the same name.

In 1833, New Haven contained three stores, two taverns, two physicians, and one tin factory.

New Haven is one of the ending points for what has come to be known as the "Old State Road" or the "Worthington-New Haven Road", an old route that connected this town and the Firelands area to Worthington and subsequently the capital city of Columbus. The Old State Road (not to be confused with current Huron County Road 52, also known as Old State Road), follows present day State Route 598 south to Galion.

== Geography ==
New Haven is in southwestern Huron County, to the west of the West Branch of the Huron River. U.S. Route 224 leads west from New Haven 3 miles (5 km) to Willard and east 8 miles (13 km) to Greenwich. State Route 61 leads north 16 miles (26 km) to Norwalk, the Huron county seat, and south 3 miles (5 km) to Plymouth, while Route 598 leads southwest 22 miles (35 km) to Galion. Mansfield is 22 miles (35 km) to the southeast via Route 61 and county roads.

According to the U.S. Census Bureau, the New Haven CDP has a total area of 1.2 square miles (3.2 km^{2}), of which 2.1 acres (8,335 m^{2}), or 0.26%, are water.

== Demographics ==
Historical population
Census	Pop.	Note	%±
2020	356		—
U.S. Decennial Census
