= Antrim Township, Ohio =

Township in Ohio, US

Antrim Township, Wyandot County, Ohio
- Township
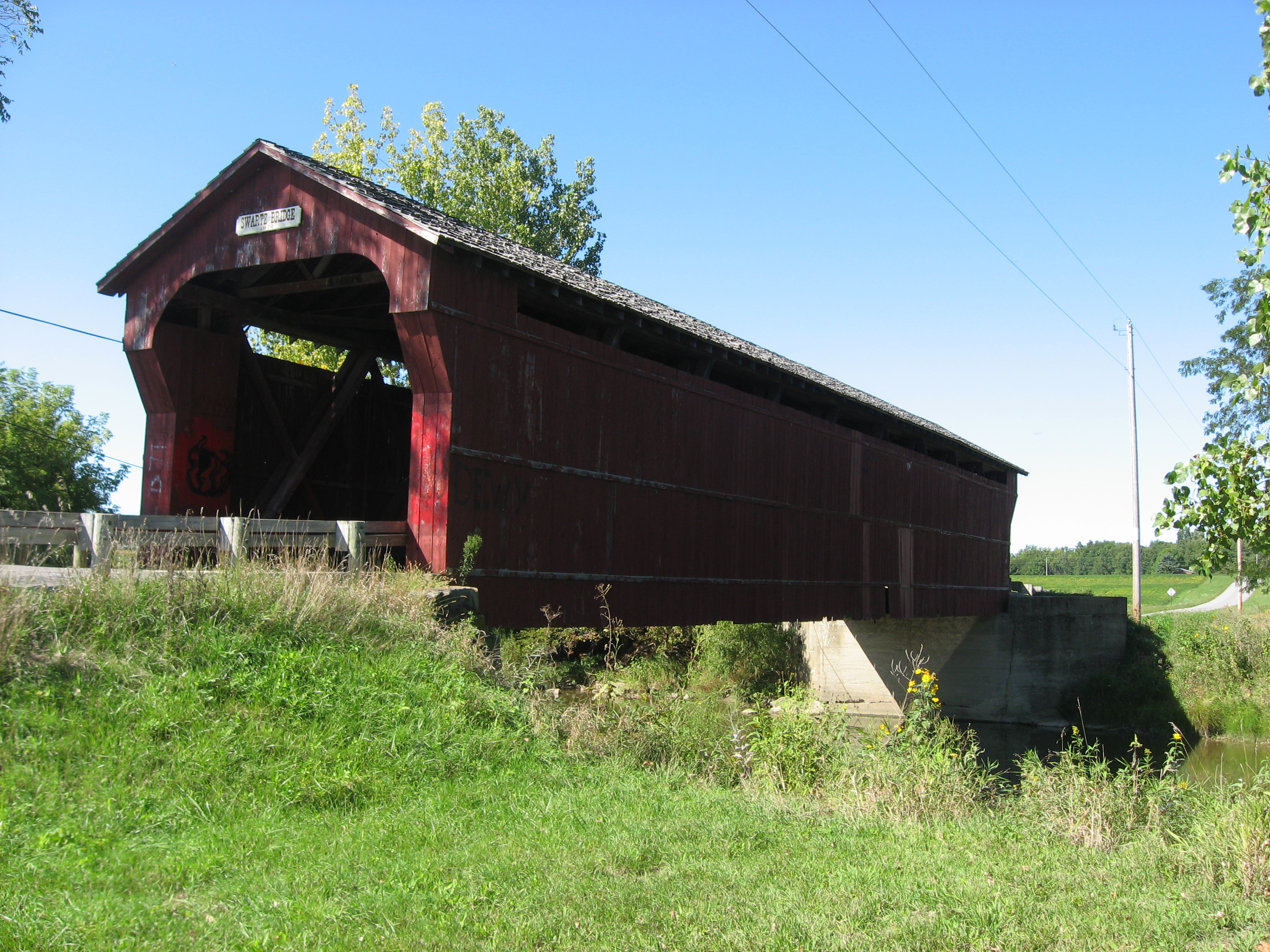
- Swartz Covered Bridge

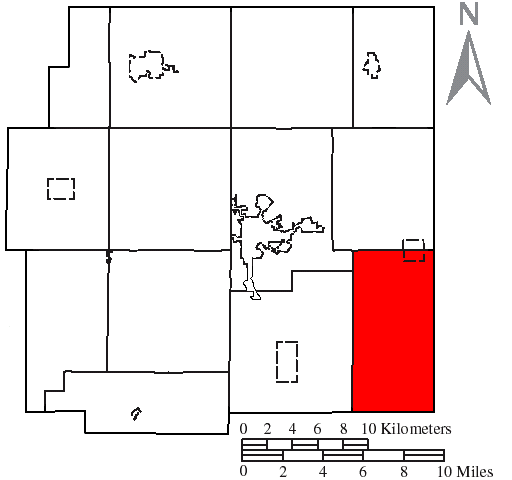
- Location of Antrim Township in Wyandot County
- Coordinates: 40°46′25″N 83°8′47″W
- Country: United States
- State: Ohio
- County: Wyandot

Area
  - Total: 32.3 sq mi (83.6 km^{2})
  - Land: 32.3 sq mi (83.6 km^{2})
  - Water: 0 sq mi (0.0 km^{2})
- Elevation: 922 ft (281 m)

Population (2020)
  - Total: 1,155
  - Density: 35.8/sq mi (13.8/km^{2})
- Time zone: UTC-5 (Eastern (EST))
  - Summer (DST): UTC-4 (EDT)
- FIPS code: 39-02190
- GNIS feature ID: 1087202

Antrim Township is one of the thirteen townships of Wyandot County, Ohio, United States. The 2020 census found 1,155 people in the township.

== Geography ==
Located in the southeastern corner of the county, it borders the following townships:

- Eden Township - north
- Tod Township, Crawford County - northeast
- Dallas Township, Crawford County - east
- Grand Prairie Township, Marion County - south
- Salt Rock Township, Marion County - southwest corner
- Pitt Township - west
- Crane Township - northwest

Part of the village of Nevada is located in northeastern Antrim Township.

== Name and history ==
It is the only Antrim Township statewide. The earliest settlers were John Kirby, Jacob Coon, Zachariah Welsh, Jesse Jurey, and Walter Woolsey.

== Government ==
The township is governed by a three-member board of trustees, who are elected in November of odd-numbered years to a four-year term beginning on the following January 1. Two are elected in the year after the presidential election and one is elected in the year before it. There is also an elected township fiscal officer, who serves a four-year term beginning on April 1 of the year after the election, which is held in November of the year before the presidential election. Vacancies in the fiscal officership or on the board of trustees are filled by the remaining trustees.
