= Auburn Center, Ohio =

Unincorporated community in Ohio, U.S.

- Unincorporated community
- Interactive map of Auburn Center, Ohio
- Coordinates: 40.9450562°N 82.7435125°W
- Country: United States
- State: Ohio
- County: Crawford County
- Township: Auburn Township

Government
  - Body: Auburn Township Board of Trustees
- Elevation: 1,004 ft (306 m)
- Time zone: UTC-5 (EST)
  - Summer (DST): UTC-4 (EDT)
- Area code(s): 419, 567

Auburn Center is an unincorporated community in Auburn Township, Crawford County, Ohio, United States.

== History ==
Auburn Center historically had a school in the settlement, as an 1855 map showed the school on the property of a man named John Sheckler. A later 1873 map had the property labeled as owned by his son, James Sheckler. In c. 1915, the school became a part of the Tiro school district, and was sold in 1922. The school was relocated several times before later being demolished.
