= Swartz Covered Bridge =

- U.S. National Register of Historic Places
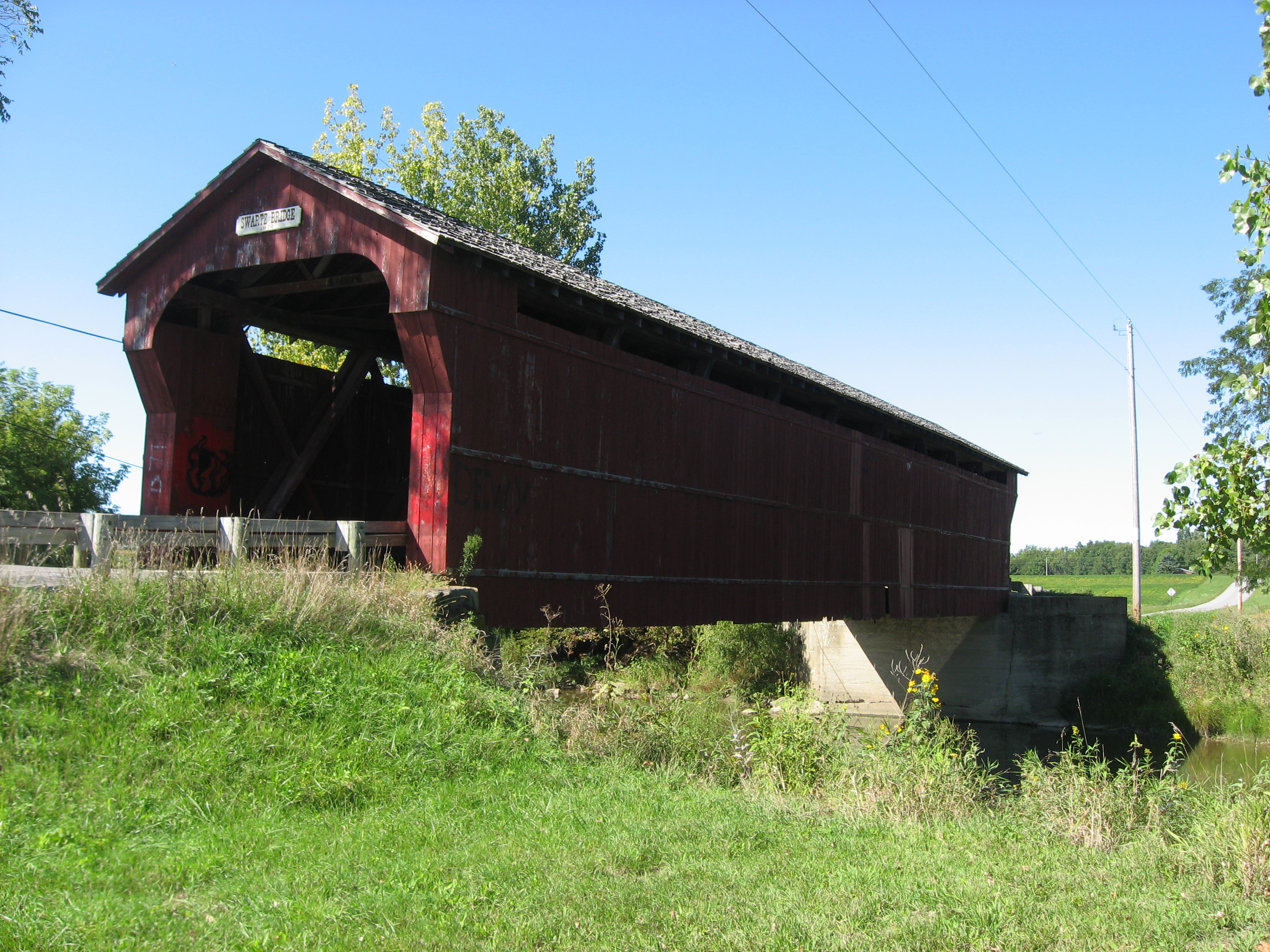

- Location within Ohio
- Nearest city: Wyandot, Ohio
- Coordinates: 40°46′14″N 83°10′09″W
- Area: less than one acre
- Built: 1880
- Architectural style: Howe truss
- NRHP reference No.: 76001553
- Added to NRHP: October 8, 1976

The Swartz Covered Bridge, near Wyandot, Ohio, was built in 1880. It was listed on the National Register of Historic Places in 1976.

It is a Howe truss covered bridge.

It is located northwest of Wyandot on County Road 130, in Antrim Township, Wyandot County, Ohio.

It is covered in the Ohio Historic Places Dictionary.
