= DeKalb, Ohio =

Coordinates: 40°53′33″N 82°46′22″W

DeKalb is an unincorporated community in Vernon Township, Crawford County, Ohio, United States.

== History ==
DeKalb was platted in 1835. A post office called DeKalb was established in 1833, and remained in operation until 1882.
