= Auburn Township, Crawford County, Ohio =

Township in Ohio, US

- Township
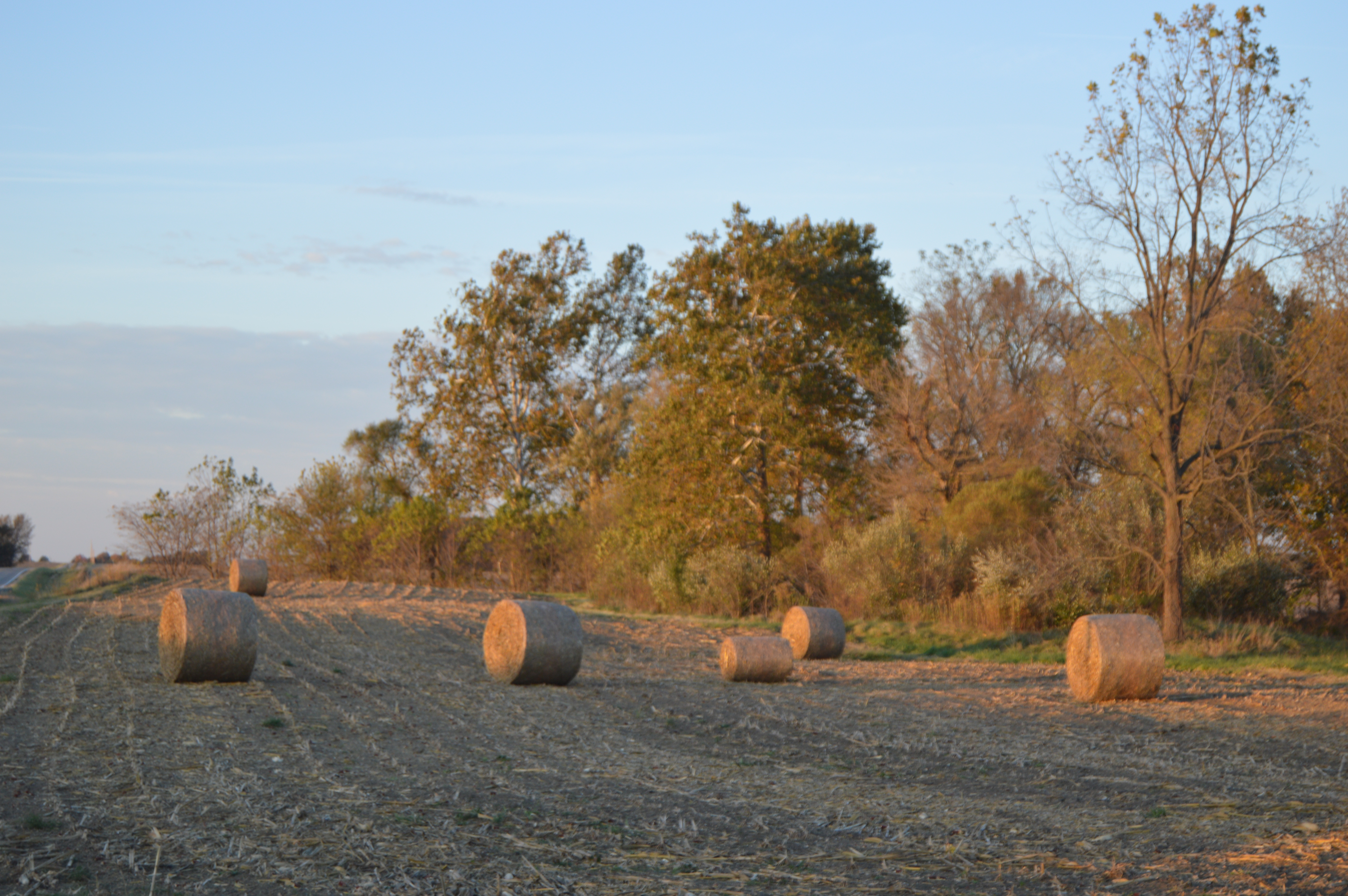
- Corn bales along State Route 39

- Location of Auburn Township in Crawford County
- Coordinates: 40°56′35″N 82°45′37″W
- Country: United States
- State: Ohio
- County: Crawford

Area
  - Total: 24.7 sq mi (64.0 km^{2})
  - Land: 24.6 sq mi (63.7 km^{2})
  - Water: 0.12 sq mi (0.3 km^{2})
- Elevation: 1,020 ft (310 m)

Population (2020)
  - Total: 738
  - Density: 30.0/sq mi (11.6/km^{2})
- Time zone: UTC-5 (Eastern (EST))
  - Summer (DST): UTC-4 (EDT)
- FIPS code: 39-02890
- GNIS feature ID: 1085932

Auburn Township is one of the sixteen townships of Crawford County, Ohio, United States. As of the 2020 census there were 738 people living in the township.

== Geography ==
Located in the northeastern corner of the county, it borders the following townships:

- Richmond Township, Huron County - north
- New Haven Township, Huron County - northeast
- Plymouth Township, Richland County - east
- Sharon Township, Richland County - southeast corner
- Vernon Township - south
- Sandusky Township - southwest corner
- Cranberry Township - west

The village of Tiro is located in southern Auburn Township, and the unincorporated communities of Mechanicsburg and Waynesburg are located in the township's south and northwest, respectively.

== Name and history ==
Auburn Township was established in 1820.

Statewide, other Auburn Townships are located in Geauga and Tuscarawas counties.

== Government ==
The township is governed by a three-member board of trustees, who are elected in November of odd-numbered years to a four-year term beginning on the following January 1. Two are elected in the year after the presidential election and one is elected in the year before it. There is also an elected township fiscal officer, who serves a four-year term beginning on April 1 of the year after the election, which is held in November of the year before the presidential election. Vacancies in the fiscal officership or on the board of trustees are filled by the remaining trustees.
