= West Liberty, Crawford County, Ohio =

Coordinates: 40°51′44″N 82°46′34″W

West Liberty is an unincorporated community in Vernon Township, Crawford County, Ohio, United States.

== History ==
West Liberty was laid out in 1835.
