= Shattucksburg, Ohio =

Shattucksburg
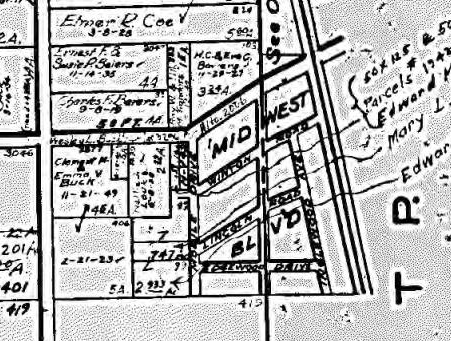
- Shattucksburg in 1950
- Interactive map of Shattucksburg
- Coordinates: 40.0515839°N 83.0452334°W
- Founded: Pre-1856
- Founder: Simon & Alexander Shattuck

Population (2016)
  - Total: 0
- ZIP code: 43220

Shattucksburg, Ohio, an area now within the city of Columbus, is a former community in Perry Township, Franklin County, Ohio. It was first created when Simon Shattuck (1793-1875) from Massachusetts, sold some of his farm land off into some plots, in 1850. Simon Shattuck operated a general store on the southwest at the intersection of Henderson Road and Kenny Road.

== History ==
Shattucksburg took shape some time between 1850 and 1856. Shattucksburg was along what was then Henderson Road, now Old Henderson Road, where it met Kenny Road. According to map records, Shattucksburg was never officially mention as a town. According to Caldwell's Atlas of Franklin Co. and the City of Columbus Ohio," published in 1872, "the place has generally been known as 'Shattucksburg,' though it was never laid out nor intended for a town."

At some point before the 1914 Perry Township map was produced, Kenny Road was renamed Kenny Free Pike and Henderson Road, between Kenny Free Pike (west) and Delaware Pike (east) was renamed Starrett Road. Between 1914 and 1927, the area grew to have six streets, not including Starrett Road. The six streets were Mobile Drive, Midwest Drive, Inglewood Avenue, Winton Road, Lincoln Road, and Edgewood Drive. Prior to 1927, Kenny Free Pike reverted to Kenny Road, Starrett Road remained the same, and Delaware Pike became Delaware Road. By 1936, Kenny Road, north of the intersection of McCoy Rd. and Highland Rd. was renamed Postlewaite Road. Before May 1941, Starrett Rd. was renamed Henderson Rd, and Delaware Rd became Olentangy River Rd. Prior to 1955, the road north of McCoy/Highland was changed back to Kenny Road.

"Shattucksburg" began to disappear from maps in the 1970s, one of the last maps showing the Shattucksburg area, as a whole, was the 1960 Census Tract Map of Franklin County. The roads had disappeared from maps for the most part by 1974, with Winton Road and Mobile Drive as exceptions.

In The City Bulletin, an official publication published by the City of Columbus city council, mentions Shattucksburg on May 17, 1982. During two of their approved city's ordinances, concerning the rezoning of property, the city council's decision stated, "said corner of Rebecca Lang's land being a distance 2277 feet west of the former Shattucksburg cross roads and in the center of Henderson road."

As of 2021, the last original roads remaining are Mobile Drive, Henderson Road (now Old Henderson Road), and Midwest Drive. The former land consists of mostly industrial buildings, including Evans Adhesive, Dale Cleaners, and The Depot Events Center, which has a train museum.

== Gallery ==
Shattucksburg
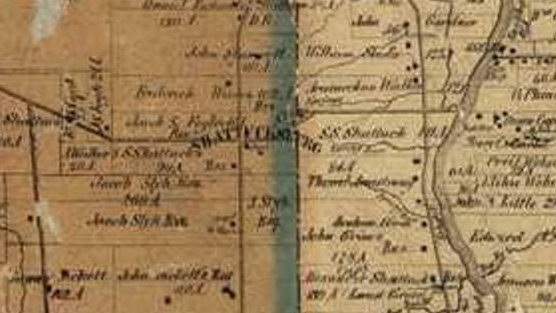
Shattucksburg in the 1856 Franklin County map, when it only had Henderson Road and Kenny Road going through it
