= Tod Township, Crawford County, Ohio =

Township in Ohio, US

- Township
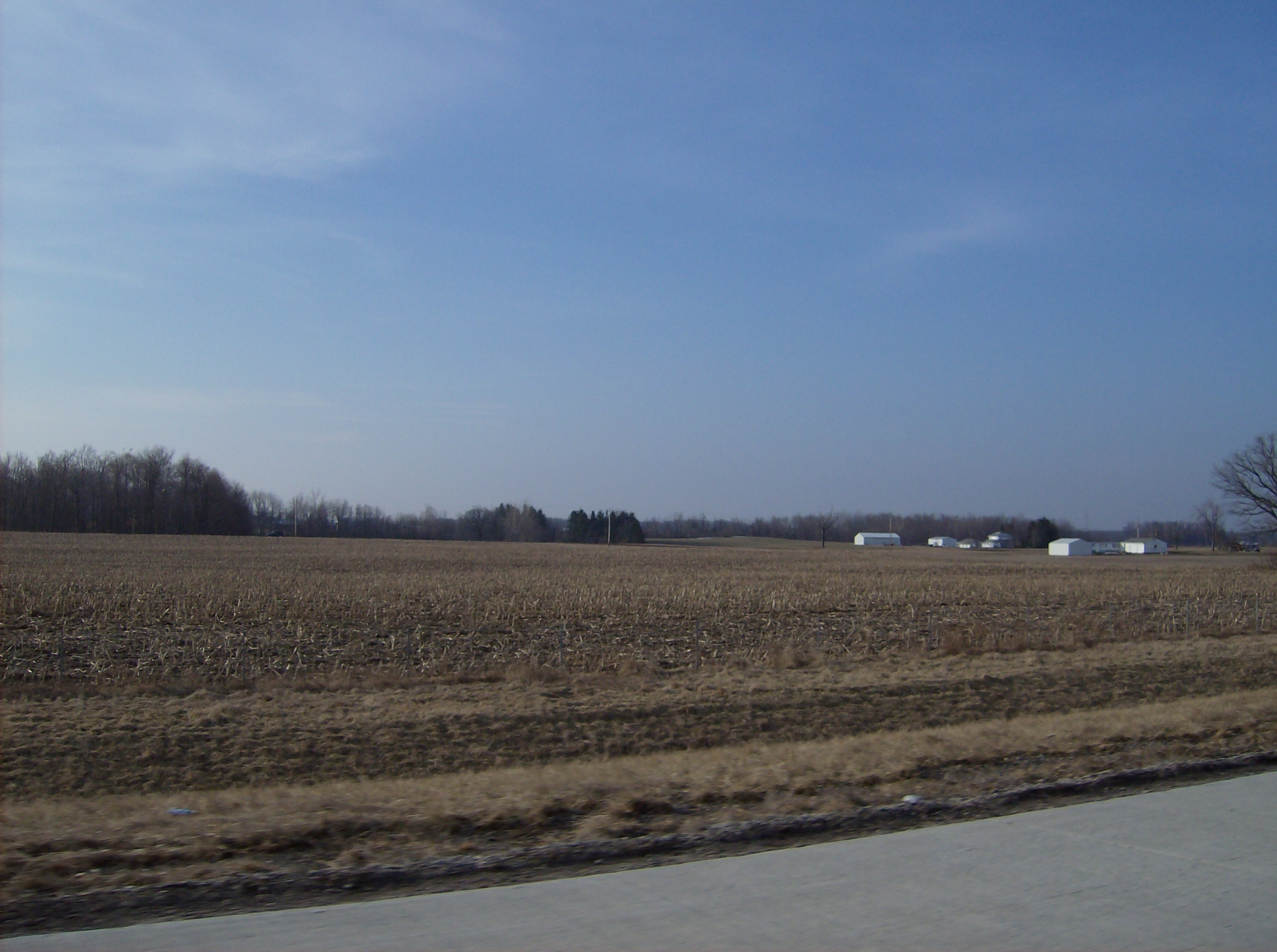
- Much of Tod Township is flat farmland

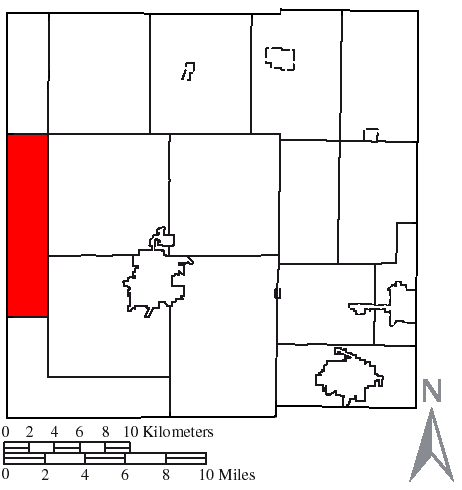
- Location of Tod Township in Crawford County
- Coordinates: 40°50′40″N 83°5′38″W
- Country: United States
- State: Ohio
- County: Crawford

Area
  - Total: 18.21 sq mi (47.17 km^{2})
  - Land: 18.20 sq mi (47.14 km^{2})
  - Water: 0.012 sq mi (0.03 km^{2})
- Elevation: 961 ft (293 m)

Population (2020)
  - Total: 627
  - Density: 34.4/sq mi (13.3/km^{2})
- Time zone: UTC-5 (Eastern (EST))
  - Summer (DST): UTC-4 (EDT)
- FIPS code: 39-76967
- GNIS feature ID: 1085946
- Website: https://todtownship.us/

Tod Township is one of the sixteen townships of Crawford County, Ohio, United States. As of the 2020 census the population was 627.

== Geography ==
Located in the western part of the county, it borders the following townships:

- Texas Township - north
- Lykens Township - northeast corner
- Holmes Township - east
- Bucyrus Township - southeast
- Dallas Township - south
- Antrim Township, Wyandot County - southwest
- Eden Township, Wyandot County - west
- Sycamore Township, Wyandot County - northwest corner

No municipalities are located in Tod Township, although the census-designated place of Oceola lies in the center of the township.

== Name and history ==
Tod Township was named for David Tod, 25th Governor of Ohio.

It is the only Tod Township statewide.

== Government ==
The township is governed by a three-member board of trustees, who are elected in November of odd-numbered years to a four-year term beginning on the following January 1. Two are elected in the year after the presidential election and one is elected in the year before it. There is also an elected township fiscal officer, who serves a four-year term beginning on April 1 of the year after the election, which is held in November of the year before the presidential election. Vacancies in the fiscal officership or on the board of trustees are filled by the remaining trustees.
