= Mechanicsburg, Crawford County, Ohio =

Coordinates: 40°54′52″N 82°46′21″W

Mechanicsburg is an unincorporated community in Auburn Township, Crawford County, Ohio, United States.

== History ==
Mechanicsburg was founded circa 1845 and was so named because many of its original inhabitants had the occupation of mechanic, such as blacksmith, carpenter and cooper.
