= Oceola, Ohio =

Coordinates: 40°50′41″N 83°05′38″W

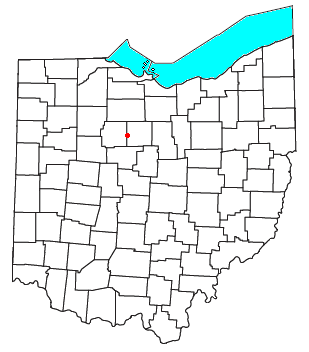
Location of Oceola, Ohio

Oceola is a census-designated place (CDP) in central Tod Township, Crawford County, Ohio, United States. As of the 2020 United States census its population was 156. It has a post office with the ZIP code 44860. It is located along the road that was U.S. Route 30 until being upgraded to a freeway.

== History ==
Oceola was laid out in 1842. The community was named for Osceola, the leader of the Seminole in Florida. A post office called Oceola has been in operation since 1840.

Since 1850, the Oceola United Brethren Church Society, the community's church, officially opened. In the early years of the church, the community of Oceola split and a new church opened, the Oceola Methodist Church. In 1854, the Brethren Society opened the church on the present site.

In 1901, the Society was remodeled, and in 1948, the building underwent a second remodeling, upgrading both the interior and exterior. Construction completed in 1954.

In 1951, the Society celebrated its centennial, with over 147 members at the time. In the same year, a merger of denominations created the Oceola Evangelical-United Brethren Church. In 1968, another merger followed, and the church became known as the Oceola United Methodist Church. The Methodist Church is no longer active, as it closed permanently on May 31, 2016.
