= Olentangy, Crawford County, Ohio =

Coordinates: 40°45′42″N 82°52′25″W

Olentangy is an unincorporated community in Whetstone Township, Crawford County, Ohio, United States.

== History ==
Olentangy was laid out in 1840. The community takes its name from the nearby Olentangy River.
