= Waynesburg, Crawford County, Ohio =

Coordinates: 40°57′37″N 82°47′33″W

Waynesburg is an unincorporated community in Auburn Township, Crawford County, Ohio, United States.

== History ==
Waynesburg was platted in 1833. It was named for General Anthony Wayne.
