= Leesville =

Leesville may refer to:

== Cities in the United States ==
- Batesburg-Leesville, South Carolina
- Leesville, California
- Leesville, Connecticut
- Leesville, Illinois
- Leesville, Indiana
- Leesville, Louisiana
- Leesville, Missouri
- Leesville, New Jersey
- Leesville, North Carolina
- Leesville, Ohio, Carroll County
- Leesville, Crawford County, Ohio
- Leesville, Texas
- Leesville, Virginia

== Civic facilities ==
- Leesville Airport
- Leesville High School
- Leesville Road High School, and its campus Leesville Complex

== See also ==
- Leeville (disambiguation)
