= Anombrocheir bifurcata =

Scientific classification
- Kingdom: Animalia
- Phylum: Arthropoda
- Subphylum: Myriapoda
- Class: Diplopoda
- Order: Polydesmida
- Family: Xystodesmidae
- Genus: Anombrocheir
- Species: A. bifurcata

Binomial name
- Anombrocheir bifurcata Gardner & Buckett, 1969

Species of millipede

Anombrocheir bifurcata is a species of Xystodesmid millipede endemic to the inland coastal range of California. The species was described by Michael R. Gardner and John S. Buckett in 1969 based on samples collected by M.R. and R.C. Gardner.

== Description ==
Anombrocheir bifurcata has an overall similar appearance to Anombrocheir spinosa and differs primarily in the structure of the gonopods. The background color is white to yellowish-grey with yellow to orange colored paranota. The gonopods of Anombrocheir are composed primarily of the large club-like telopodite, which lacks secondary processes. In A. bifurcata, the tip of the telopodite is distinctly bifurcated and this feature is also the basis for the species name.

== Range ==
The species is found in a small localized population in Colusa and Yolo counties just south of the range of A. spinosa. As with A. spinosa, the population lies in the Great Valley Sequence of the Inner Coastal Range of California. The area is dominated by oak grasslands, and the millipedes are primarily found in thick oak duff.
