= Tornadoes of 2017 =

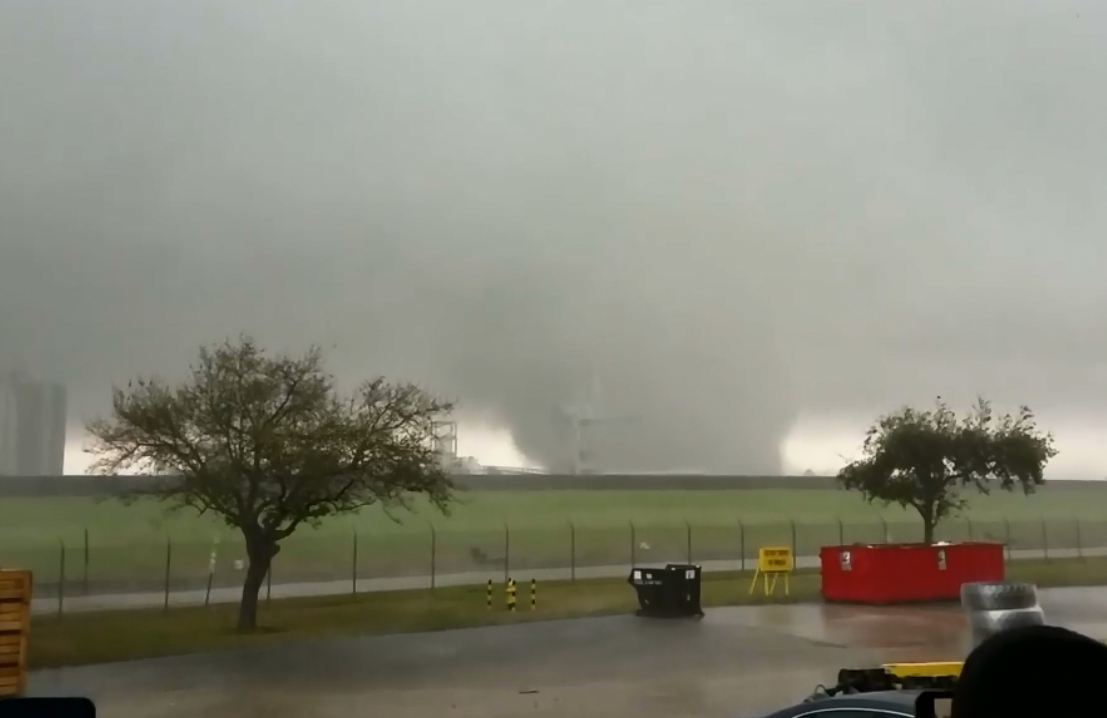
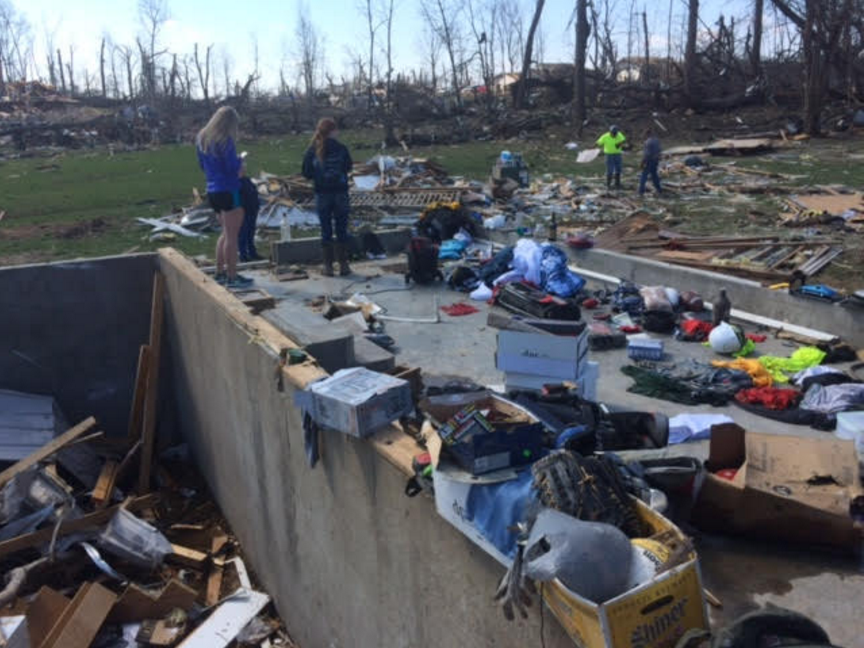
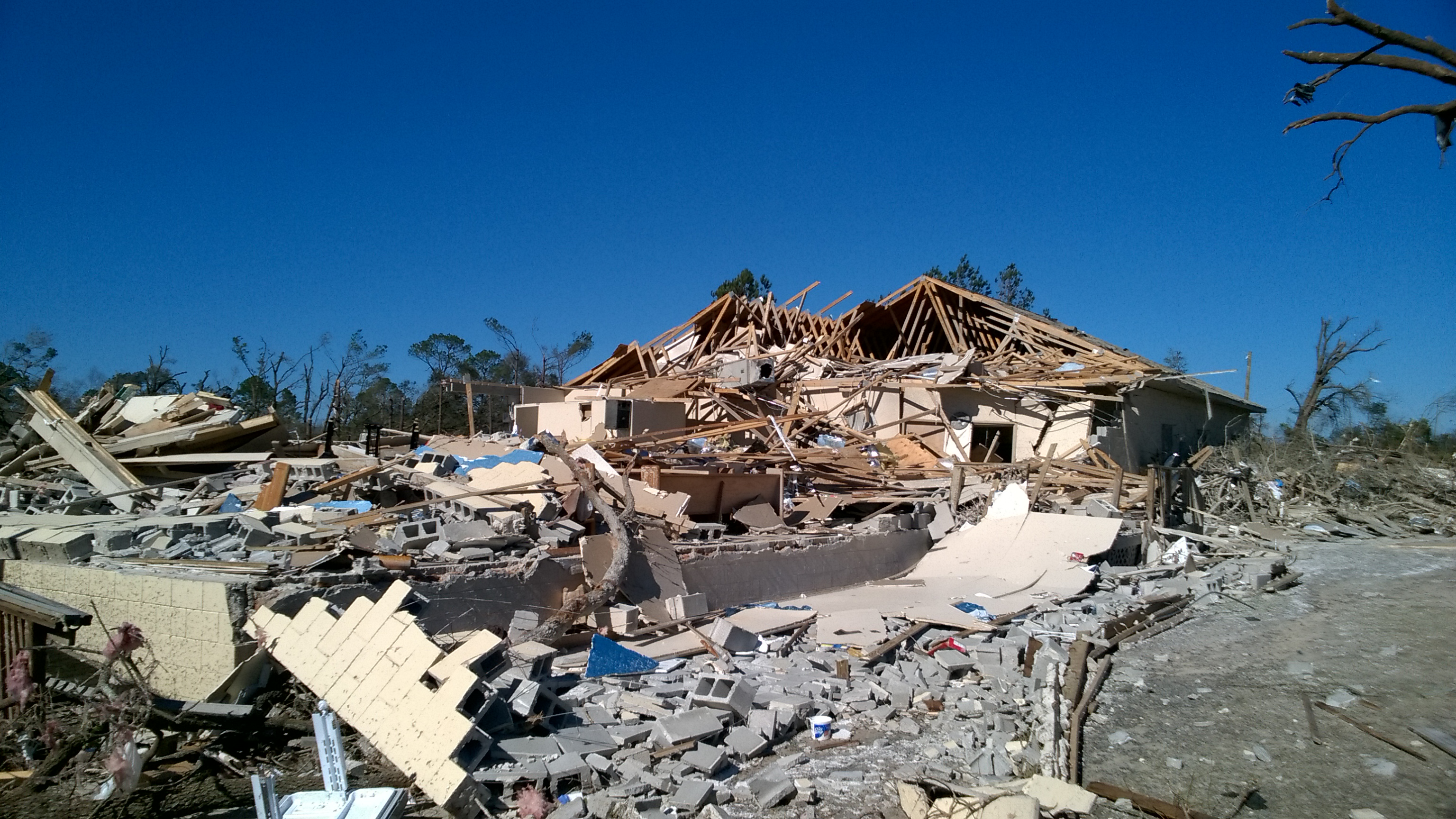
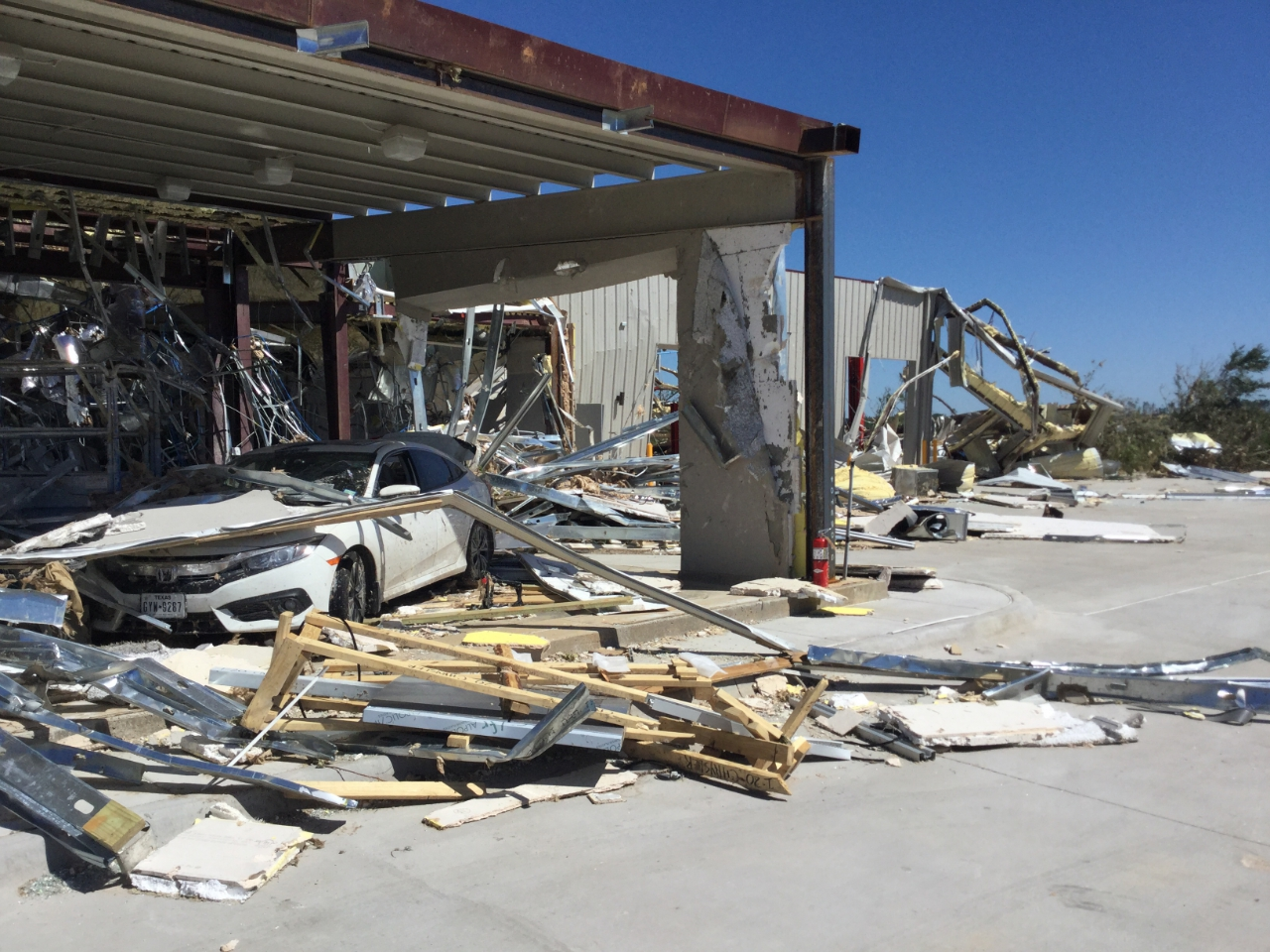
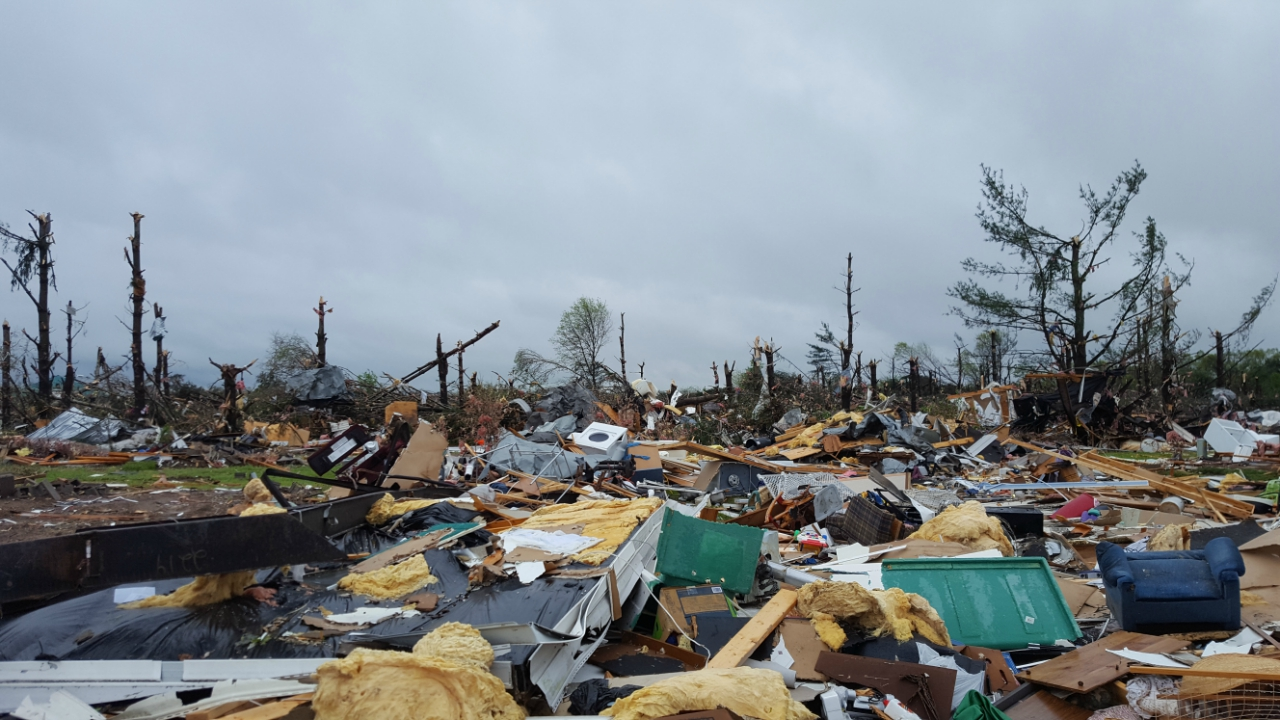
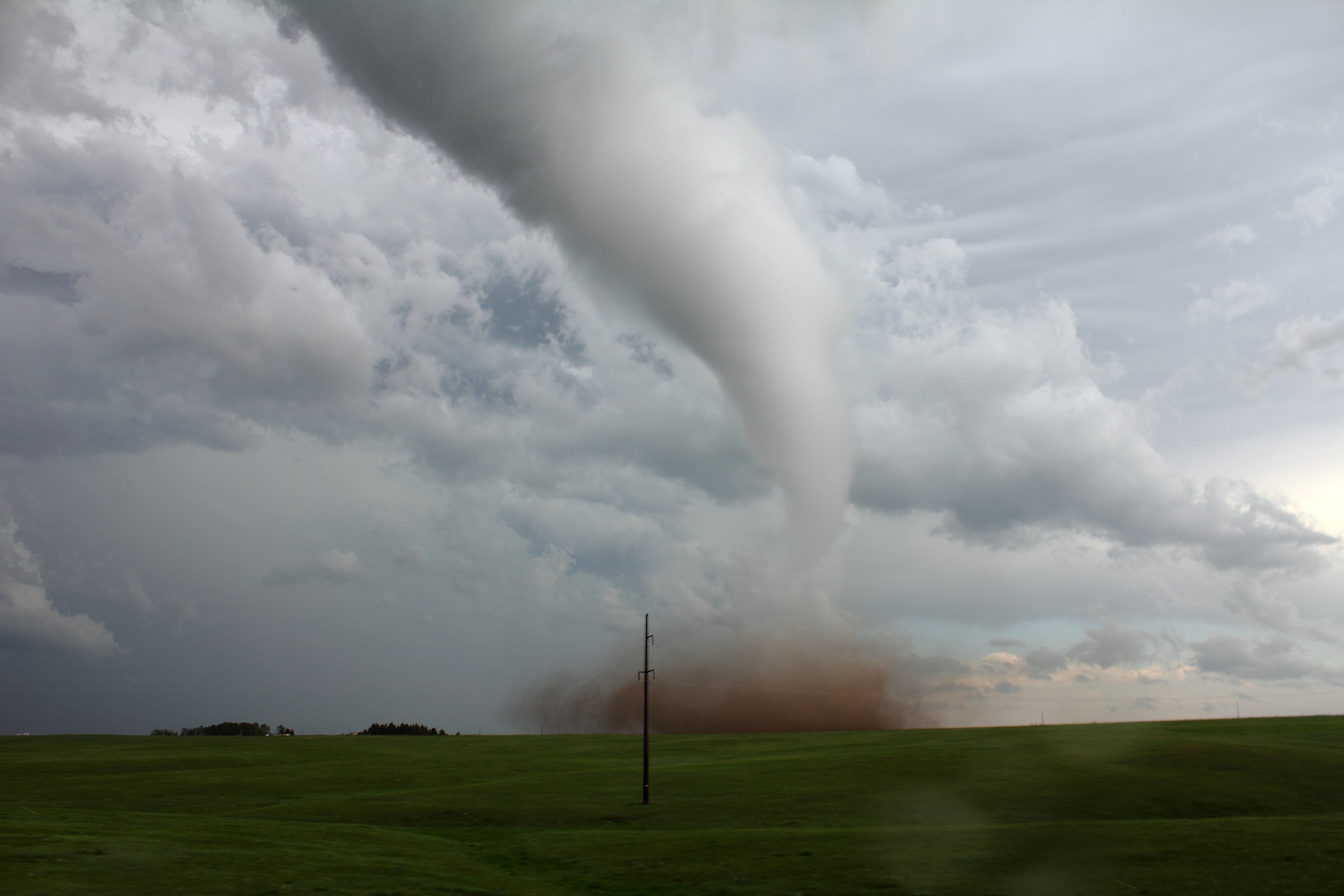
- Clockwise from top: An EF3 tornado near New Orleans, Louisiana on February 7; EF3 damage to a church in Albany, Georgia following a tornado on January 22; Damage to a mobile home community near Chetek, Wisconsin after an EF3 tornado on May 16; An EF1 tornado near Kimball, Nebraska on June 12; Damage to a car dealership in Canton, Texas following an EF3 tornado on April 29; EF4 damage to a home in Perryville, Missouri following a tornado on February 28.
- Timespan: January 2 – December 20
- Maximum rated tornado: EF4 tornado: Perryville, Missouri on February 28; Canton, Texas on April 29; Maloye Pes’yanovo, Kurgan Oblast (IF4) on June 18; Chifeng, Inner Mongolia on August 11 (3 tornadoes)
- Tornadoes in U.S.: 1,420
- Damage (U.S.): > $5 billion
- Fatalities (U.S.): 35
- Fatalities (worldwide): 44

This page documents notable tornadoes and tornado outbreaks worldwide in 2017. Strong and destructive tornadoes form most frequently in the United States, Brazil, Bangladesh, and Eastern India, but they can occur almost anywhere under the right conditions. Tornadoes also develop occasionally in southern Canada during the Northern Hemisphere's summer and somewhat regularly at other times of the year across Europe, Asia, Argentina and Australia. Tornadic events are often accompanied with other forms of severe weather, including strong thunderstorms, strong winds, and hail. There were 1,522 reports of tornadoes in the United States in 2017, of which 1,420 were confirmed. Worldwide, 44 fatalities were confirmed in 2017; 35 in the United States, five in China, two in Paraguay, and one in Brazil.

The tornado season in 2017 started exceptionally early, having the second most active January since records began in 1950, and one of the most active first quarters in recorded history. 2017 also had four high risk outlooks issued by the Storm Prediction Center, the most since five were issued in 2011 and since the start of the five-category outlook system in 2014. 2017 had the 2nd most active January for confirmed tornadoes, behind January 1999 but ahead of January 2023.

== Events ==
=== United States ===
Confirmed tornadoes by Enhanced Fujita rating
EFU	EF0	EF1	EF2	EF3	EF4	EF5	Total
67	618	592*	128	13	2	0	1,420

- Note: An EF2 tornado from Canada crossed into the United States, where that portion of the track was rated EF1.

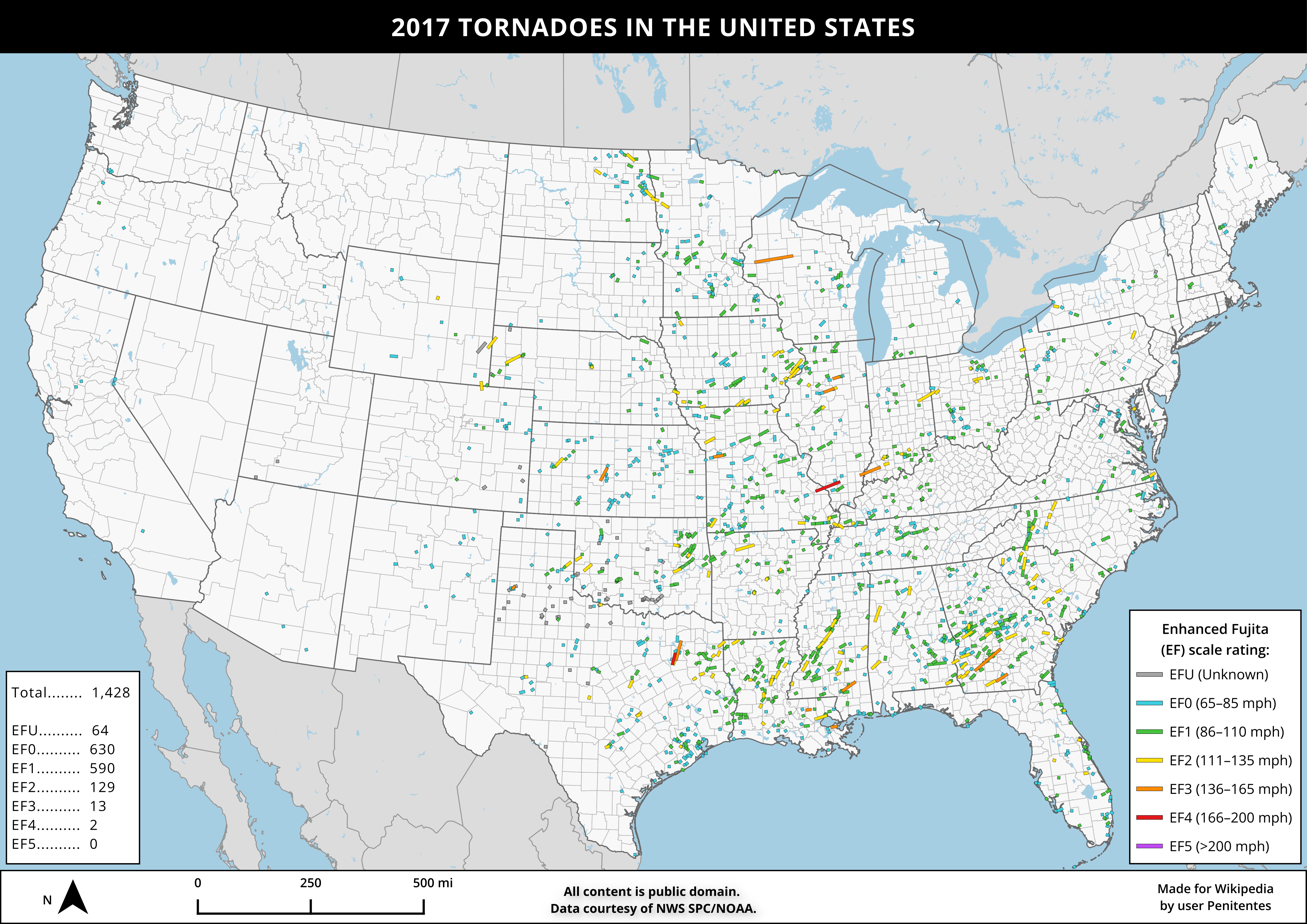
A map of 2017 United States tornado paths from the results of storm surveys.

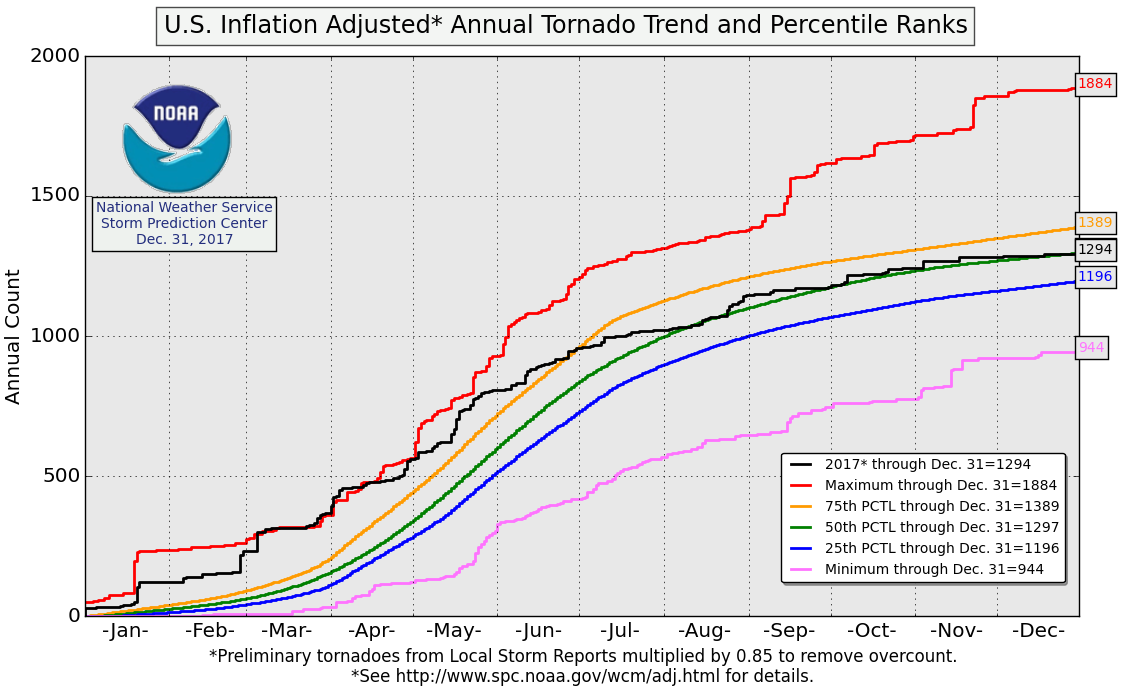
A chart of the 2017 United States tornado count estimated from the number of preliminary reports

Fatal United States tornadoes in 2017
- Approximate touchdown location of killer tornadoes in 2017 Summary of tornadoes: January 21 – Mississippi (4 deaths); January 22 – Georgia (11 deaths); January 22 – Georgia (5 deaths); February 7 – Louisiana (1 death); February 28 – Illinois (2 deaths); February 28 – Missouri (1 death); February 28 – Illinois (1 death); April 2 – Louisiana (2 deaths); April 3 – South Carolina (1 death); April 29 – Texas (2 deaths); April 29 – Texas (2 deaths); April 30 – Mississippi (1 death); May 16 – Wisconsin (1 death); May 16 – Oklahoma (1 death); Total fatalities: 35

== January ==
=== January 2 (United States) ===
EFU	EF0	EF1	EF2	EF3	EF4	EF5
0	5	26	5	0	0	0

On December 26, 2016, the Storm Prediction Center noted the potential for a severe risk to evolve across the Southern United States in the extended range. On December 31, a slight risk for severe weather was noted from southeastern Texas through far western Alabama. The risk area was shifted eastward and heightened to an enhanced risk the following day, with the SPC warning of the potential for damaging wind gusts and a strong tornado or two. A mesoscale convective system developed across eastern Texas early on January 2, aided by the combination of a strong upper-level trough, a moderately unstable atmosphere, and sufficient moisture. As the convection progressed east, hundreds of damaging wind reports and numerous tornado reports were received. The Louisiana towns of Bunkie and Hessmer sustained moderate damage from EF1 tornadoes. An EF2 tornado destroyed chicken houses and caused tree damage near Mount Olive, Mississippi, while another EF2 struck Rehobeth, Alabama, causing considerable damage at a local festival grounds. Rear flank downdraft winds away from the Rehobeth tornado killed four people when a large tree crushed a mobile home. Three separate EF2 tornadoes occurred near Blakely and Arlington, Georgia, causing major tree damage, destroying farm structures, and causing severe roof damage to a few homes. Overall, this outbreak produced 36 tornadoes.

Damage from the storm system exceeded US$250 million.

=== January 15–16 (United States) ===
EFU	EF0	EF1	EF2	EF3	EF4	EF5
0	7	3	2	0	0	0

The SPC first highlighted a severe weather threat area along and south of the Red River in Texas on January 12, valid three days later. A Slight risk was introduced farther southwest over West Texas on January 13, with subsequent shifts northeast. With a negatively tilted upper-level low across the Southwest United States, abundant moisture and strong upper-level winds overspread the risk area, and the SPC warned of semi-discrete/line-embedded supercells capable of large hail, damaging winds, and isolated tornadoes. A total of 11 tornadoes touched down on January 15 through the next morning, including two EF2s that impacted areas near Gatesville, Texas, and Brady, Texas. An EF0 tornado caused minor damage in Grand Prairie, Texas, while an EF1 damaged multiple homes in Clifton.

=== January 21–23 (United States) ===
EFU	EF0	EF1	EF2	EF3	EF4	EF5
0	23	44	11	3	0	0

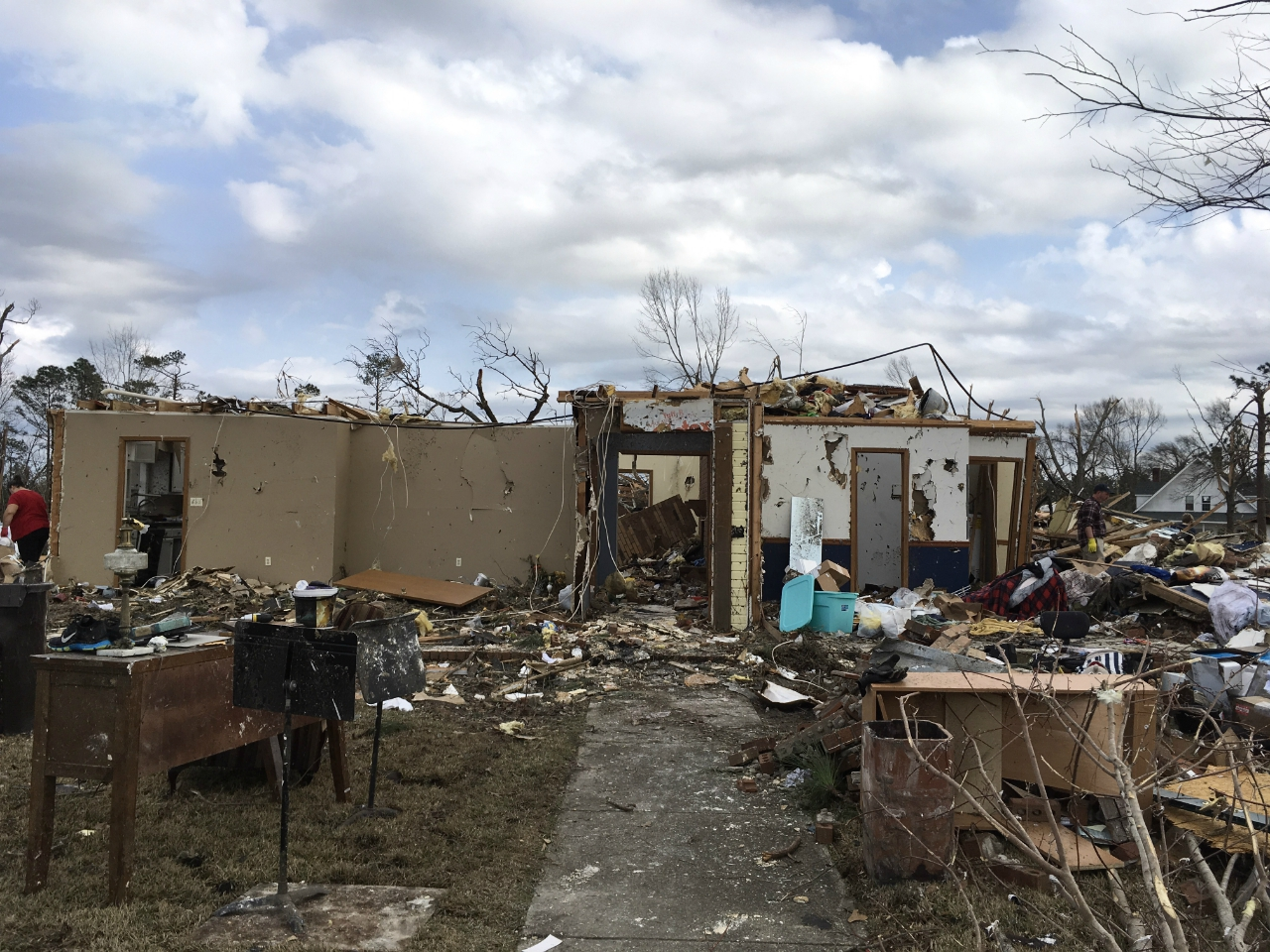
EF3 damage to a house in Hattiesburg, Mississippi.

In the pre-dawn hours of January 21, a complex of strong thunderstorms affected the Gulf Coast states, where the SPC had issued an Enhanced risk of severe weather. The possibility of discrete cells forming ahead of this complex was mentioned, and one such cell led to the formation of a large and destructive EF3 tornado from 09:35 UTC to 10:13 UTC across Lamar, Forrest, and Perry counties in Mississippi. Traveling along a 31.3-mile (50.4 km) path, the EF3 heavily affected sections of Hattiesburg, where 4 deaths occurred. Later that day, a Moderate risk was issued across portions of southern Arkansas, northeastern Louisiana, and western Mississippi. Although the risk area was issued explicitly for the threat of large hail, several tornadoes were assessed to have touched down, including two EF2 tornadoes that impacted areas east of Plain Dealing and Natchez, Louisiana. During the early morning hours of January 22, a devastating EF3 tornado impacted portions of Brooks, Cook, and Berrien counties—most notably in areas around Adel—killing 11 people. This tornado was the deadliest of the entire year.

Later that day, a severe weather and tornado outbreak was expected to occur across northern Florida and southern Georgia, prompting the SPC to issue their first High risk since June 3, 2014, and the first in the winter months since the 2008 Super Tuesday tornado outbreak. An extremely large EF3 wedge tornado affected the southern and eastern reaches of Albany, killing 4 people and injuring more than 50 others. Another person in Albany succumbed to her injuries and died on January 26. This outbreak killed 20 people and injured many more, making it the second deadliest January tornado outbreak since 1950, behind the 1969 Hazlehurst, Mississippi tornado outbreak.

== February ==
=== February 7 (United States) ===
EFU	EF0	EF1	EF2	EF3	EF4	EF5
0	5	6	3	1	0	0

A localized outbreak of 15 tornadoes impacted Southern United States on February 7. A few of these tornadoes were strong, with the most significant damage occurring in Louisiana. A large EF2 wedge tornado destroyed homes near Killian, Louisiana. An EF1 tornado caused considerable damage in the town of Donaldsonville, killing one person. A large, damaging tornado of EF3 intensity ripped through portions of Eastern New Orleans, damaging or destroying numerous homes, businesses, and industrial buildings. An EF2 tornado near Watson toppled metal truss towers and destroyed manufactured homes. At least 33 people were injured by the New Orleans tornado with up to 6 being serious. Another EF2 tornado also damaged multiple homes and destroyed a flea market near Harperville, Mississippi.

=== February 19–20 (United States) ===
EFU	EF0	EF1	EF2	EF3	EF4	EF5
0	4	2	3	0	0	0

Scattered tornadoes impacted the state of Texas on February 19 and 20. This included an EF2 and an EF1 tornado that moved through densely populated parts of San Antonio, Texas. The San Antonio tornadoes caused major roof damage to numerous homes, apartment buildings, and businesses along their paths, and downed numerous trees. EF0 tornadoes also caused minor damage in Windcrest and Garden Ridge. Two simultaneous EF2 tornadoes caused significant damage to grain silos, homes, train cars, and power poles in and around the town of Thrall as well.

=== February 25 (United States) ===
EFU	EF0	EF1	EF2	EF3	EF4	EF5
0	1	3	1	0	0	0

Five tornadoes struck on February 25 in Pennsylvania, Maryland, and Massachusetts. An EF2 in Pennsylvania damaged a metal horse barn, severely damaged two houses, and caused varying degrees of damage to 28 additional houses. An EF1 in Massachusetts caused damage to two houses in Goshen. Farther east, in and near Conway, numerous trees were snapped and uprooted and several other houses were severely damaged. This tornado was the first Massachusetts tornado on record during the month of February.

=== February 28 – March 1 (United States) ===
EFU	EF0	EF1	EF2	EF3	EF4	EF5
0	17	42	8	3	1	0

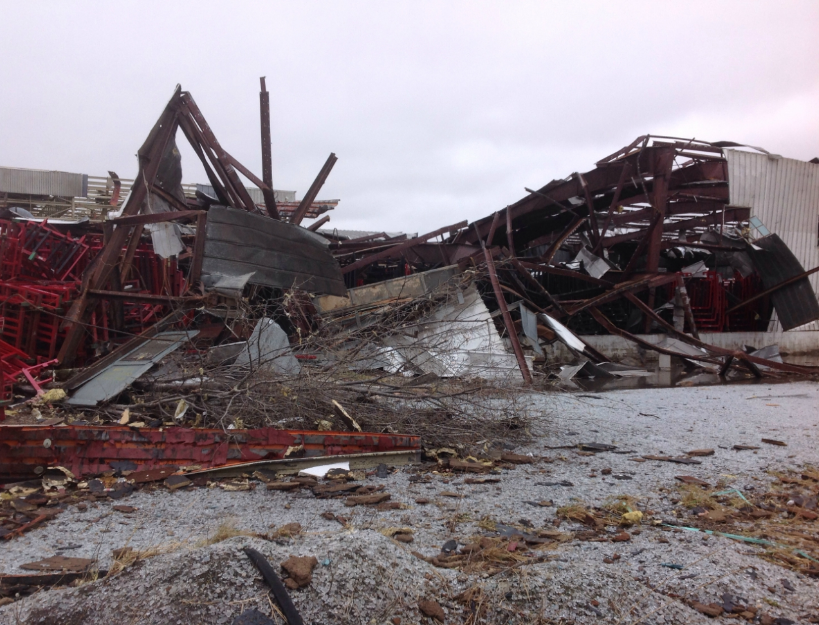
EF3 damage to a glass plant in Naplate, Illinois.

A strong storm complex produced a significant and widespread tornado outbreak in and around the Ohio Valley and the Midwest. A moderate risk was issued by the Storm Prediction Center for Tuesday, February 28. This included a 15% hatched risk area for tornadoes. Several damaging tornadoes touched down, including a violent EF4 that leveled and swept away homes at the north edge of Perryville, Missouri, and killed one person. An EF3 struck the towns of Naplate and Ottawa, Illinois, and killed two people, while a fourth person was killed as a result of a long-track EF3 that passed near Crossville, Illinois, and into Indiana. An EF3 tornado also caused severe damage in and around the town of Washburn, Illinois. This was the most intense February tornado outbreak to affect Illinois since 1950, with at least three tornadoes of EF3 or greater intensity, including the Ottawa event, which was the northernmost February EF3 on record in the state of Illinois. The tornado that impacted the Perryville area tracked at least 50 miles and was also the first violent tornado of 2017. Overall, this outbreak produced 72 tornadoes and killed four people.

== March ==
=== March 6–7 (United States) ===
EFU	EF0	EF1	EF2	EF3	EF4	EF5
0	24	29	9	1	0	0

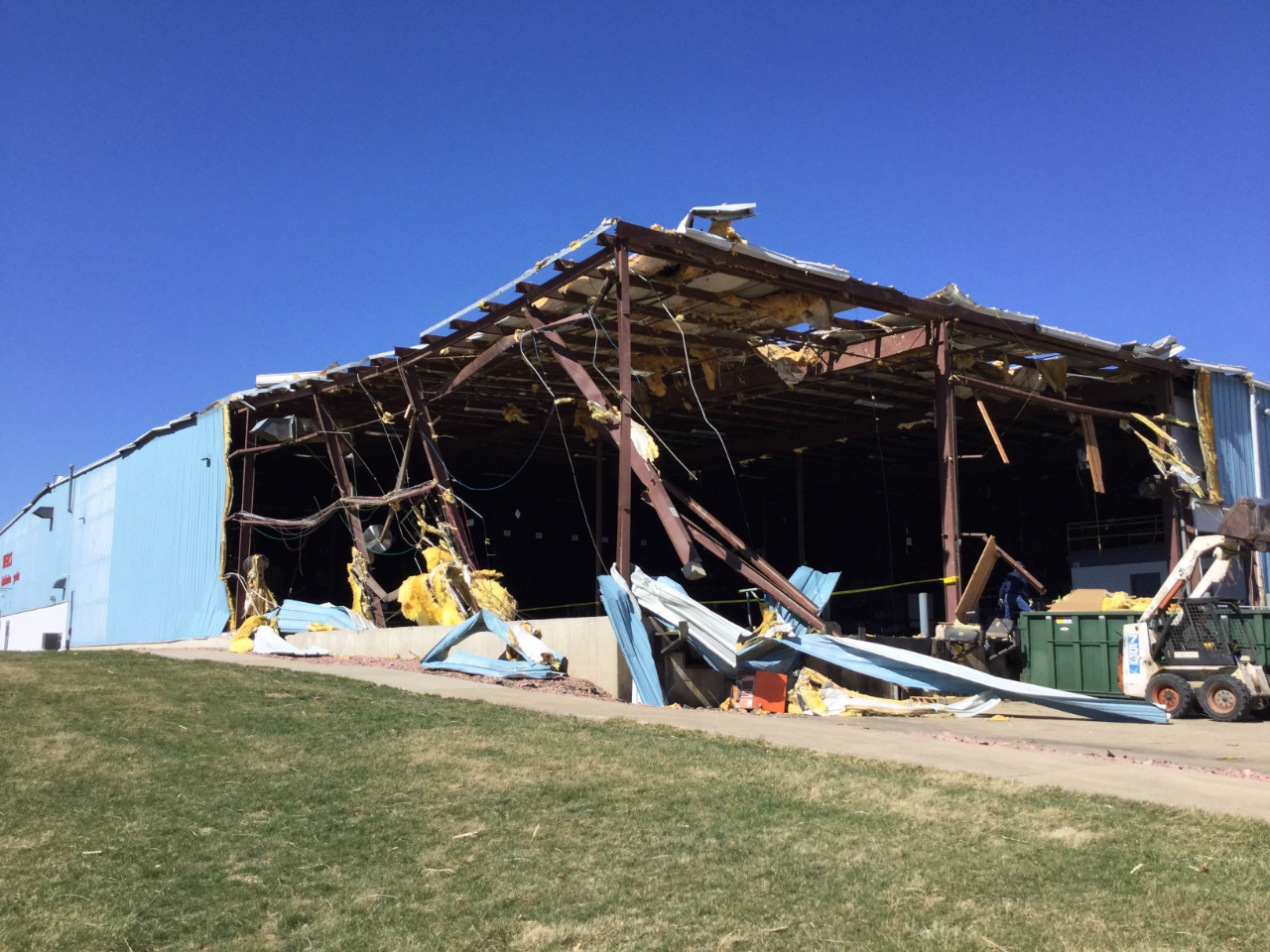
EF2 damage to a manufacturing facility in the southern part of Centerville, Iowa.

Following the issuance of an enhanced risk for severe weather from the Storm Prediction Center; including a 10% hatched risk area for tornadoes, an outbreak of strong tornadoes impacted the Midwest and Ohio Valley for the second time in the matter of days. Most of the tornadoes occurred during the nighttime and early morning hours, and were embedded in a large quasi-linear convective system. This included an EF3 that impacted the southern part of Oak Grove, Missouri, damaging or destroying nearly 500 buildings and injuring 12 people. A high-end EF2 tornado damaged or destroyed multiple homes near Smithville and Lathrop in Missouri. In Iowa, the towns of Muscatine, Centerville, and Seymour all sustained significant damage from EF2 tornadoes. Another EF2 caused heavy damage in Parthenon, Arkansas. An EF1 that touched down near the town of Bricelyn, Minnesota, was the earliest Minnesota tornado on record. A total of 63 tornadoes occurred as a result of this outbreak, and numerous reports of hail and damaging straight-line winds were received as well. No fatalities occurred, though 19 people were injured. But then, just a moment after sunset.

=== March 9 (Germany) ===
An F1 tornado accompanied by a rainbow was recorded and photographed in Kürnach, Germany and caused considerable damage to the roofs of 20 to 30 homes. Two trees were blown over and one garden shed was also blown down. An additional 80 houses were reportedly damaged to a lesser extent.

=== March 9 (United States) ===
EFU	EF0	EF1	EF2	EF3	EF4	EF5
0	7	7	3	0	0	0

A total of 17 tornadoes touched down in the states of Missouri, Tennessee, and Kentucky, including an EF2 that crossed from Missouri into Kentucky near Hickman, Kentucky. The tornado damaged a few sheds, destroyed several grain bins, and blew over some irrigation pivots. Another EF2 formed in Hickman, damaging 45 structures, knocking down numerous power poles, and snapping or uprooting many trees. The tornado briefly continued into Tennessee before dissipating. Near Doniphan, Missouri, an EF2 tornado moved through heavily forested areas, snapping and uprooting thousands of trees along its path and destroying a barn. An EF1 occurred in the southern part of Murray, Kentucky, and caused extensive damage to two dugouts at a high school which had their roofs torn off and hurled, a well-built steel barn was damaged, and a building was destroyed by falling trees. Another EF1 struck the town of Bernie, Missouri, causing moderate damage to several homes.

=== March 12 (Brazil) ===
A significant tornado occurred near Canguçu in southern Rio Grande do Sul. A large number of trees were blown over in a convergent pattern, and some were debarked. Less than 10 hours afterwards, another strong tornado touched down in the city of São Francisco de Paula, where more than 400 houses were damaged, 40 of which were destroyed. Trees were snapped, zinc tiles were stripped from roofs, and metal structures were twisted. A 24-year-old man was killed as a result of the tornado.

=== March 24 (United States) ===
EFU	EF0	EF1	EF2	EF3	EF4	EF5
0	2	6	3	0	0	0

A total of 11 tornadoes impacted the states of Washington, Louisiana, Texas and Arkansas. The first tornado of the event was an EF0 tornado that struck the Vancouver, Washington suburb of Orchards, causing minor tree and property damage. Later that day, an EF2 occurred near Marshall, Texas, and snapped or uprooted many trees, destroyed a metal outbuilding, damaged multiple carports, and ripped roofing off several residences. Another EF2 tornado passed near the town of Gibson, Arkansas, and destroyed four mobile homes and damaged several others. A third EF2 ripped the roof off a house and caused heavy damage to other structures near Lonsdale, Arkansas, as well. A large EF1 wedge tornado passed near Natchitoches, Louisiana, and damaged a metal warehouse, a pool supply building, and several outbuildings and homes. Another EF1 near Stanley started out as a waterspout that moved ashore, lifting three boats out of the water; two were launched 250-300 yards (230–270 m) while the other was deposited in the back yard of a house. Several homes were also damaged by this tornado. No fatalities or serious injuries occurred as a result of this event.

=== March 28–31 (United States) ===
EFU	EF0	EF1	EF2	EF3	EF4	EF5
7	15	14	3	0	0	0

A four-day outbreak of 39 tornadoes impacted the Southern United States and Mid-Atlantic regions. Most of these tornadoes were weak, though a few EF2 tornadoes occurred, including one that struck the town of Oakdale, Louisiana, and caused considerable damage to homes and businesses. Another EF2 tornado near Midkiff, Texas, snapped many power poles, displaced grain silos, and damaged an outbuilding. The most significant tornado of the event was an EF2 that struck parts of Chesapeake and Virginia Beach, Virginia, heavily damaging numerous homes, downing many trees, and partially destroying a church. In addition, several weak EF0 and EF1 tornadoes impacted parts of the Houston metro as well as the Dallas–Fort Worth metroplex, resulting in relatively minor damage. No fatalities or serious injuries occurred as a result of this outbreak.

== April ==
=== April 2–3 (United States) ===
EFU	EF0	EF1	EF2	EF3	EF4	EF5
0	22	32	8	0	0	0

On April 2, the Storm Prediction Center issued a high risk for severe weather, including a 30% risk area for tornadoes across northern Louisiana into far eastern Texas. Strong, long-track tornadoes were expected to occur in the region. Early that day, an EF1 tornado near Breaux Bridge, Louisiana, killed a mother and daughter after destroying their mobile home while they were inside of it. Another EF1 tornado struck Alexandria, causing considerable damage to homes and businesses. Later that afternoon and evening, multiple strong tornadoes touched down in the threat area, including several large, wedge tornadoes. One of these EF2 tornadoes struck Belah and Trout, toppling metal truss towers, snapping many trees and power poles, and collapsing a boat business. Another EF2 tornado struck Aimwell, damaging several homes and a church. An EF2 tornado near Winnsboro tossed trailers and mobile homes, and also destroyed a small home. Several tornadoes continued to touch down across parts of the Southern United States the following day, including an EF1 tornado that killed one person after destroying a mobile home near Whitmire, South Carolina. An EF2 tornado near Cameron snapped many trees and power poles, and destroyed several barns and metal storage buildings. Several businesses in the downtown portion of Gordon, Georgia, sustained significant damage as a result of an EF2 tornado as well. Overall, the outbreak produced 62 tornadoes and resulted three fatalities.

=== April 4–6 (United States) ===
EFU	EF0	EF1	EF2	EF3	EF4	EF5
0	16	16	6	0	0	0

An EF2 tornado struck the town of Goodman, Missouri, during a severe weather outbreak that began on April 4, causing major structural damage to an elementary school and multiple other buildings in the town, including homes and a fire station as well. Numerous trees were also uprooted or blown down. An EF1 also struck a chicken farm near Seligman, Missouri, the same day, while another EF1 occurred near Bergman, Arkansas, damaging homes and destroying a garage and a mobile home. A more significant and widespread outbreak of severe weather was anticipated on April 5, with the Storm Prediction Center initially issuing a moderate risk for severe thunderstorms across parts of the Southern United States. At 16:29 UTC, the SPC upgraded the moderate risk to a high risk for parts of Georgia and South Carolina in anticipation of what was expected to be a major tornado outbreak. However, a mainly unidirectional wind profile was present in the threat area that day, though explosive CAPE values and very steep lapse rates in combination with locally enhanced helicity due to outflow boundaries left behind by earlier storms were expected to compensate for this. Despite these factors, the outbreak of strong and destructive tornadoes that was expected did not occur, aided in part by cold-air damming in northern Georgia, along with large amounts of stratiform rain and shower activity occurring in parts of the state as well as in the Florida Panhandle. This blocked adequate moisture and lapse rates from building, and caused stabilization of the atmosphere in some parts of the threat area.

Despite the reduced threat, a large EF2 wedge tornado touched down near Bakerhill, Alabama, and continued into Georgia before dissipating near Morris, causing major tree damage, ripping much of the roof off a brick house, and damaging several other structures. Another EF2 wedge tornado tracked from the eastern part of Johnston, South Carolina, and directly through Ward, causing damage to a few homes and businesses and snapping or uprooting many trees. A large and damaging EF2 also tracked from just east of Cadwell, Georgia, to near Soperton, destroying an auto body shop, multiple outbuildings, a radio antennae, and much of the second floor of a two-story home. Near Weston, chicken houses, outbuildings, a mobile home, and a peanut farm storage building were destroyed as a result of another EF2 tornado. Weak tornadoes also touched down in Illinois, Indiana, Ohio, Kentucky, Tennessee, and Alabama as well, including rare anticyclonic EF1 tornadoes near Shelbyville, Tennessee, and Eminence, Kentucky. On April 6, an enhanced risk for severe weather was issued for parts of the Mid-Atlantic region, and several additional tornadoes touched down. This included an EF0 tornado that touched down in Arlington, Virginia, and moved directly into downtown Washington D.C. The D.C. tornado damaged light poles in the Pentagon parking lot, downed trees near the George Mason Memorial, and damaged the roof of the St. Aloysius Church. After the initial D.C. tornado dissipated, a second EF0 tornado downed several trees at Bolling Air Force Base, blowing the roof off of an apartment building and damaging flag posts. Further south, an isolated EF2 tornado near Yeehaw Junction, Florida, downed many trees and damaged 20 homes, including three manufactured homes that were destroyed. Overall, this outbreak produced 38 tornadoes and no fatalities.

=== April 8 (Paraguay) ===
On the evening of April 8, a strong tornado struck the small village of San Javier, Paraguay, located just north of San Ignacio. A church and some small brick homes were leveled, and several other structures sustained significant damage, including the town clinic, school, and police station. Many trees were snapped or uprooted, two people were killed, and others were injured.

=== April 25 (Paraguay) ===
For the second time in one month, a strong tornado caused major damage in Paraguay, touching down on the evening of April 25 and causing major damage in the villages of Colonia Neufeld, Cerrito and Loma Hovy, damaging or destroying at least 300 homes. Two schools, two police stations, and other structures were damaged or destroyed as well. Vehicles were flipped, debris was scattered through fields, and severe tree damage occurred along the path. According to officials, 80% of the homes in Colonia Neufeld were badly damaged or destroyed. Structural damage in Loma Hovy was less intense, though 70% of the homes in town sustained roof loss. No known fatalities occurred as a result of this tornado.

=== April 28 – May 1 (United States) ===
EFU	EF0	EF1	EF2	EF3	EF4	EF5
0	25	42	8	1	1	0

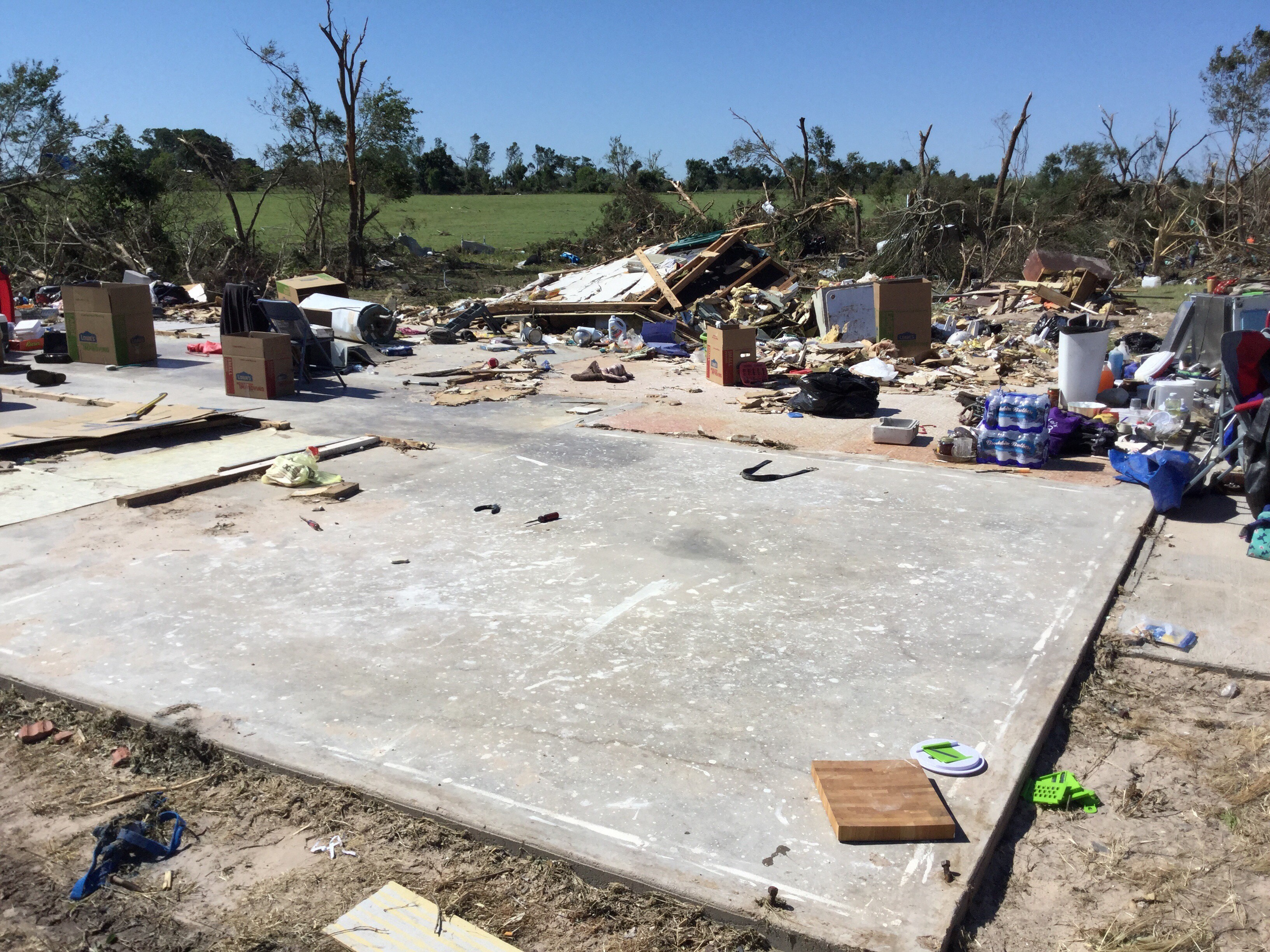
EF4 damage to a two-story brick house southwest of Canton, Texas.

Numerous tornadoes ripped through the central United States as a powerful storm system developed in the Rockies. Mainly EF0 and EF1 tornadoes were seen on April 28. Tornadoes made multiple appearances in Louisiana, Texas, and Arkansas on this day. Massive swaths of large hail up to two inches (5.1 cm) in diameter and wind speeds up to 81 mph (135 km/h) were also reported on April 28. On April 29, two long-lived and particularly dangerous tornadoes ripped through the Canton, Texas area, killing four people and injuring many others. One tornado was rated EF3 and the other was rated EF4 on the Enhanced Fujita Scale. April 30 saw a total of 41 tornadoes touch down in Arkansas, Missouri, Louisiana, Mississippi, Tennessee, and Alabama. An EF2 tornado killed one person and caused considerable damage in the town of Durant, Mississippi. Tornadoes were not the only threat with this storm complex as a large number of Flash Flood Watches went up in areas the storms were impacting. Isolated rainfall totals up to eleven inches were seen in far south Indiana and parts of Missouri. The heavy rainfall combined with the strong winds from the severe thunderstorms allowed for trees to be brought down easily in locations that received excessive rainfall. Streets were reported to be impassable and some roads were even closed due to the heavy rains. A few generally weak tornadoes were scattered around on May 1. Tornadoes were not the primary threat on May 1; however straight line winds in excess of 85 mph (137 km/h) were reported throughout the eastern seaboard of the United States. Overall, this outbreak produced 77 tornadoes and 20 deaths. Only five of the deaths were a direct result of tornadoes, while other deaths occurred from the flooding and heavy snow the storm system brought as well.

== May ==
=== May 15–20 (United States) ===
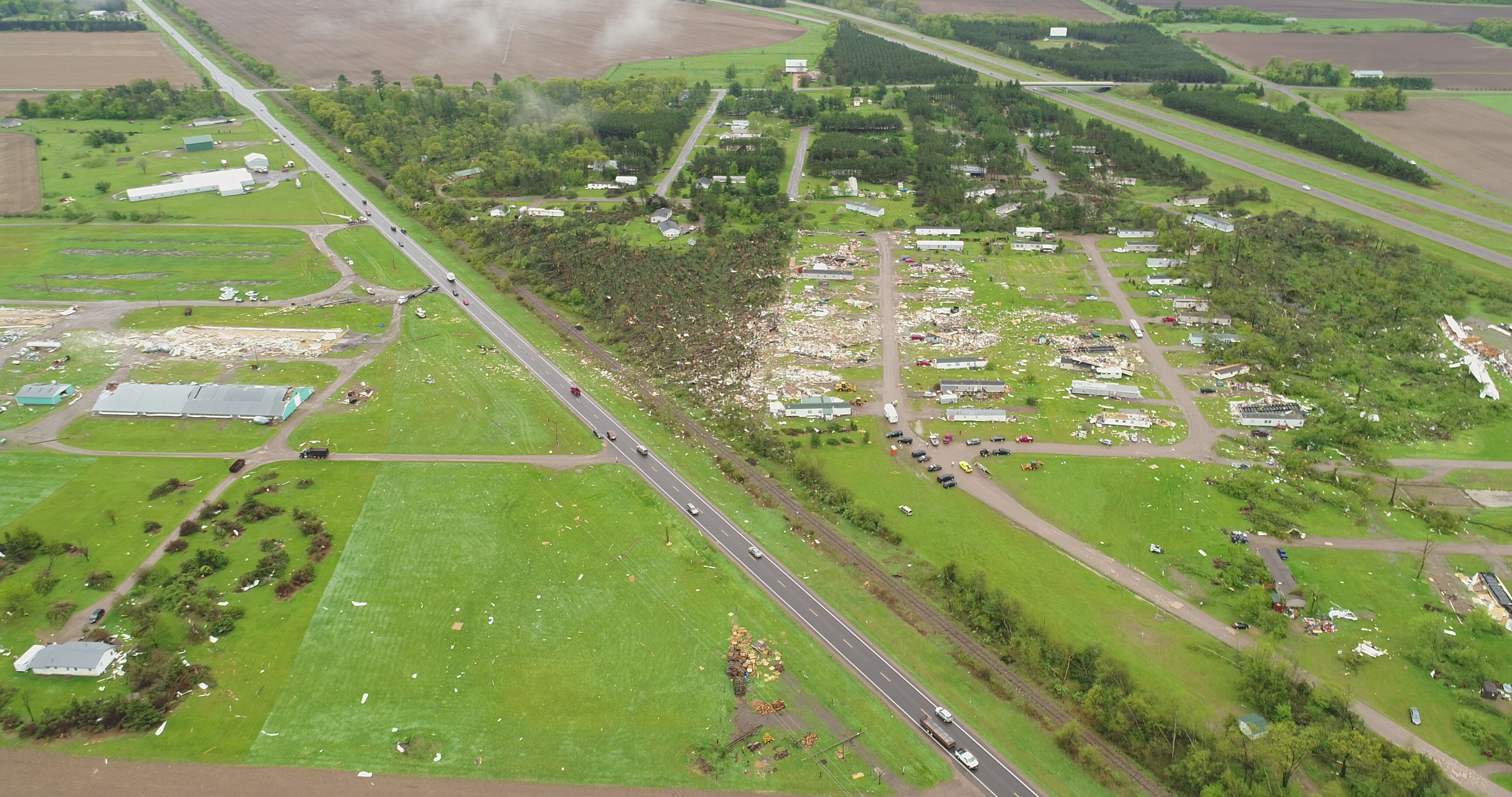
Aerial view of the Prairie Lakes Estates mobile home park near Chetek, Wisconsin, where one person was killed by an EF3 tornado on May 16.

EFU	EF0	EF1	EF2	EF3	EF4	EF5
22	62	41	7	2	0	0

Throughout a six-day period, starting on May 15, numerous tornadoes occurred across portions of the Great Plains, Great Lakes, and Ohio Valley, some of which were strong. The most significant activity occurred on May 16, as numerous tornadoes touched down across the Great Plains states and as far north as Wisconsin. A high-end EF2 tornado struck the southern part of Elk City, Oklahoma, damaging or destroying numerous homes and businesses, tossing vehicles, and killing one person. Another strong tornado caused damage to homes in the town of Pawnee Rock, Kansas, before it passed near Great Bend, debarking trees and completely destroying farm homes at high-end EF3 strength. Another EF3 tornado moved through four counties in Wisconsin, destroying a mobile home park near Chetek, snapping and uprooting countless trees, and destroying a frame home near Conrath. The Chetek/Conrath tornado was officially the longest-tracked tornado in Wisconsin state history, and killed one person while injuring 25 others. Tornado activity was not as intense on May 17, though an EF2 embedded in a squall line ripped the roof off of a house near Galva, Illinois, injuring one person. By May 18, a major outbreak of strong tornadoes was expected across the Great Plains, and a high risk of severe weather was issued by the Storm Prediction Center. However, most of the tornadoes that occurred that afternoon an evening were weak, with the strongest being three EF2s that occurred in parts of Texas and Oklahoma. One of these EF2s struck the city of Muskogee, Oklahoma, causing major damage to trees, apartment buildings, and industrial buildings. A separate EF1 tornado also impacted the western part of Muskogee, causing additional damage to homes and businesses, as well as downing many trees. Numerous EF0 and EF1 tornadoes were observed across multiple states on May 18 and 19 before the outbreak came to an end. Overall, this outbreak sequence produced 134 tornadoes and killed 2 people.

=== May 23–24 (United States) ===
EFU	EF0	EF1	EF2	EF3	EF4	EF5
0	19	12	5	0	0	0

A potent storm system made its way throughout the southern and midwestern portions of the United States on May 23. A high-end EF1 which touched down in Autryville, North Carolina, destroyed a mobile home and the Autryville Volunteer Fire Department, causing one minor injury. Further south in Georgia, an EF2 touched down in Wilmington Island and continued to the Fort Pulaski National Monument, where the visitor center sustained damage. The tornado then entered the Atlantic Ocean as a waterspout and capsized the fishing vessel Miss Debbie. The three crew members aboard were presumed dead on May 27 after a multi-day search. Tornado activity continued on May 24, with multiple tornadoes striking the Carolinas, including four strong EF2 tornadoes. One of these EF2 tornadoes heavily damaged an elementary school near Yadkinville, North Carolina, while another caused major tree and house damage near Statesville. Another EF2 tornado damaged a YMCA camp near Hanging Rock State Park. Near Saluda, South Carolina, an EF2 downed many trees and destroyed several outbuildings. Further north, the towns of Ironton and Park Layne, Ohio, sustained considerable damage from EF1 tornadoes. Overall, this outbreak produced 37 tornadoes and killed three people.

== June ==
=== June 3 (Russia) ===
FU	F0	F1	F2	F3	F4	F5
0	8	17	2	1	0	0

On June 3, an unusual outbreak of tornadoes affected the Ural region of Russia, which is typically not prone to tornado activity. Most of the tornadoes only caused tree damage in this sparsely populated and heavily forested area, though the town of Staroutkinsk sustained a direct hit from an F2 tornado, where dozens of homes were significantly damaged and numerous trees were snapped in forests outside of town. The strongest tornado of the outbreak was a large F3 wedge tornado that passed near Visim, flattening a massive swath of trees in a convergent pattern. Numerous weak tornadoes also caused tree damage in other unpopulated wooded areas. A total of 28 tornadoes were confirmed as a result of this outbreak, none of which caused any injuries or fatalities.

=== June 12–14 (United States) ===
EFU	EF0	EF1	EF2	EF3	EF4	EF5
3	19	17	4	0	0	0

On June 12, the Storm Prediction Center issued a moderate risk for severe thunderstorms across southeast Wyoming, northwest Nebraska, and southwest South Dakota. The risk area included a 15% hatched area for tornadoes across southeastern Wyoming, and a 45% hatched area for severe hail across the entire moderate risk area. In the early afternoon, the Storm Prediction Center issued a Particularly Dangerous Situation tornado watch across the hatched area for tornadoes, as supercells began to form along the northern part of a cold front. Several tornadoes touched down in Colorado, Wyoming, and Nebraska, including four EF2 tornadoes. One of these tornadoes was caught on video and photographed by numerous storm chasers as it passed near Carpenter, Wyoming, causing severe damage to outbuildings, vehicles, power poles, and homes in the area. An EF2 near Torrington tossed vehicles and horse trailers, heavily damaged a home, killed three horses, and injured two people. Another EF2 near Kaycee snapped many trees and destroyed a mobile home. In Nebraska, a long-track, multiple-vortex EF2 tornado passed near Bayard, tearing the roof and an exterior wall from a house, denuding trees, twisting irrigation pivots, damaging outbuildings, and destroying a garage. A separate brief EF1 tornado touched down in Bayard, causing considerable damage to a nursing home. In the late afternoon and early evening, the supercells merged into a squall line and produced isolated damaging wind gusts across South Dakota.

The next day, the Storm Prediction Center issued an enhanced risk for severe weather, including a 10% risk area for tornadoes across parts of the Dakotas and Minnesota. In the mid-afternoon, supercells began to form along a cold front in eastern South Dakota. Additionally, numerous severe thunderstorms formed along the front from Minnesota to Texas. The storms produced multiple weak tornadoes throughout the risk area, none of which exceeded EF1 in intensity. By early evening, the cells merged into a squall line and continued east. The squall line continued to produce a few more tornadoes, in addition to large hail and damaging straight-line winds. On June 14, the squall line continued to produce wind damage, as well as producing a few more weak tornadoes in Wisconsin, all of which did relatively minor damage. Overall, this outbreak produced 40 tornadoes and did not result in any fatalities.

=== June 16 (United States) ===
EFU	EF0	EF1	EF2	EF3	EF4	EF5
0	4	5	1	0	0	0

Two tornadoes spawned by semi-discrete supercell thunderstorms embedded within a larger line of severe storms produced severe damage in the southern suburbs of Omaha, Nebraska, on the evening of June 16. One of these tornadoes was a high-end EF2 that downed many trees and caused major structural damage to homes as it moved through multiple subdivisions in the southern part of Bellevue. The other tornado was an EF1 that struck Offutt Air Force Base, moving planes from their original locations, downing trees, and damaging the roofs of several structures. Several other weak tornadoes were observed across parts of Nebraska and Kansas that evening. In addition, an EF1 tornado struck Pascagoula, Mississippi, causing considerable structural damage to commercial buildings. A total of 10 tornadoes were confirmed.

=== June 18 (Russia) ===
FU	F0	F1	F2	F3	F4	F5
4	4	4	3	0	1	0

On June 18, the Ural region of Russia was affected by a significant tornado outbreak for the second time in one month. Two separate IF2 tornadoes moved through dense forest near Novotroitskoye and Zavodoukovsk, snapping or uprooted numerous trees along their paths. Another large, multiple-vortex IF2 tornado downed numerous trees and damaged multiple homes in the Baksary area as well. The most intense tornado of the outbreak was a violent IF4 that struck the rural community of Maloye Pes'yanovo, where several homes sustained major damage, four well-built log homes were completely leveled, and several people were injured. Vehicles were damaged, and numerous trees were snapped or denuded along the path, some of which sustained severe debarking. The Maloye Pes'yanovo tornado was the first confirmed violent (IF4+) tornado in Russia since 1984. Multiple other weak tornadoes were confirmed across the Ural region and other areas of Russia, including a tornado of unknown intensity that struck Tsentral'noye, where trees were snapped and homes sustained roof damage. A total of 16 tornadoes were confirmed.

=== June 18 (Canada) ===
EFU	EF0	EF1	EF2	EF3	EF4	EF5
0	1	8	4	1	0	0

An outbreak of tornadoes, some of which were strong, impacted parts of Quebec on the afternoon and evening of June 18. An EF2 tornado heavily damaged or destroyed a few homes, cabins, garages and barns hear Hébertville, and downed numerous trees as well. Three other EF2 tornadoes snapped or uprooted numerous large trees in rural areas near Lac Bachon, Lac Tom, and Lac de la Corneille. The strongest tornado of the event produced EF3 damage near Sainte-Anne-du-Lac, as several houses were damaged, and one home was swept from its cinder block foundation and completely destroyed, with only the basement remaining. Large swaths of trees were completely mowed down in forested area near Sainte-Anne-du-Lac, and some barns were damaged or destroyed as well. In other rural areas of Quebec, eight EF1 tornadoes downed trees and caused some damage to structures, while an EF0 tornado briefly touched down near L'Étape, causing no known damage. A total of 14 tornadoes were confirmed.

=== June 28 (United States) ===
EFU	EF0	EF1	EF2	EF3	EF4	EF5
0	10	13	4	0	0	0

A small outbreak of tornadoes affected the Midwestern United States, with the most intense tornadoes touching down in Iowa. The most significant tornado of the event was an EF2 that struck the small town of Prairieburg, Iowa, where a grain elevator sustained major damage, mobile homes were destroyed, and trees were snapped. An EF2 tornado near Monticello destroyed garages, outbuildings, and grain bins, while another EF2 near Sidney ripped the roof off of a home, snapped trees, and destroyed outbuildings. Multiple other weak tornadoes were observed across parts of Wisconsin, Minnesota, Missouri, and Illinois. A total of 27 tornadoes were confirmed.

== July ==
=== July 1 (United States) ===
EFU	EF0	EF1	EF2	EF3	EF4	EF5
0	2	3	0	0	0	0

A small outbreak of weak tornadoes impacted portions of central Maine, specifically Cumberland and Oxford counties. The most impactful tornado was a high-end EF1 tornado that struck the town of Bridgton. The tornado downed numerous large trees, some of which landed on structures and vehicles, and damaged a campground as well. One person was injured by flying glass. With five tornadoes, this became the largest tornado outbreak in Maine.

=== July 20 (United States) ===
EFU	EF0	EF1	EF2	EF3	EF4	EF5
0	1	2	1	0	0	0

Four tornadoes touched down in upstate New York on July 20. An EF1 tornado struck the town of Holland, downing many trees and resulting in many blocked roads and railways in the area. Several structures also sustained damage. The most significant tornado of the event was an EF2 tornado that struck Hamburg, tearing the roof off a building, and damaging numerous cars and the grandstand at the local fairgrounds. Many trees were downed, multiple homes were damaged, and a large garage structure had its roof torn off. An EF1 tornado near Angelica, as well as an EF0 tornado near Houghton caused damage to trees, homes, and outbuildings. No fatalities occurred as a result of these tornadoes.

=== July 24 (United States) ===
During the very early morning hours of July 24, a strong waterspout spawned by an isolated supercell thunderstorm formed over Chesapeake Bay. Moving across Kent Island, the destructive EF2 tornado caused major damage in Stevensville, Maryland. Homes, townhouses, a church, a business, and a warehouse building were all severely damaged or destroyed by the tornado. Vehicles were flipped, a boat was thrown, gas leaks occurred, and trees and metal power poles were downed. One person was injured by flying debris. This became the first EF2 or stronger tornado in Maryland since 2004, and left 3700 customers without power. A brief EF0 tornado was also confirmed near Snydertown, Pennsylvania.

== August ==
=== August 6 (United States) ===
EFU	EF0	EF1	EF2	EF3	EF4	EF5
0	0	3	1	0	0	0

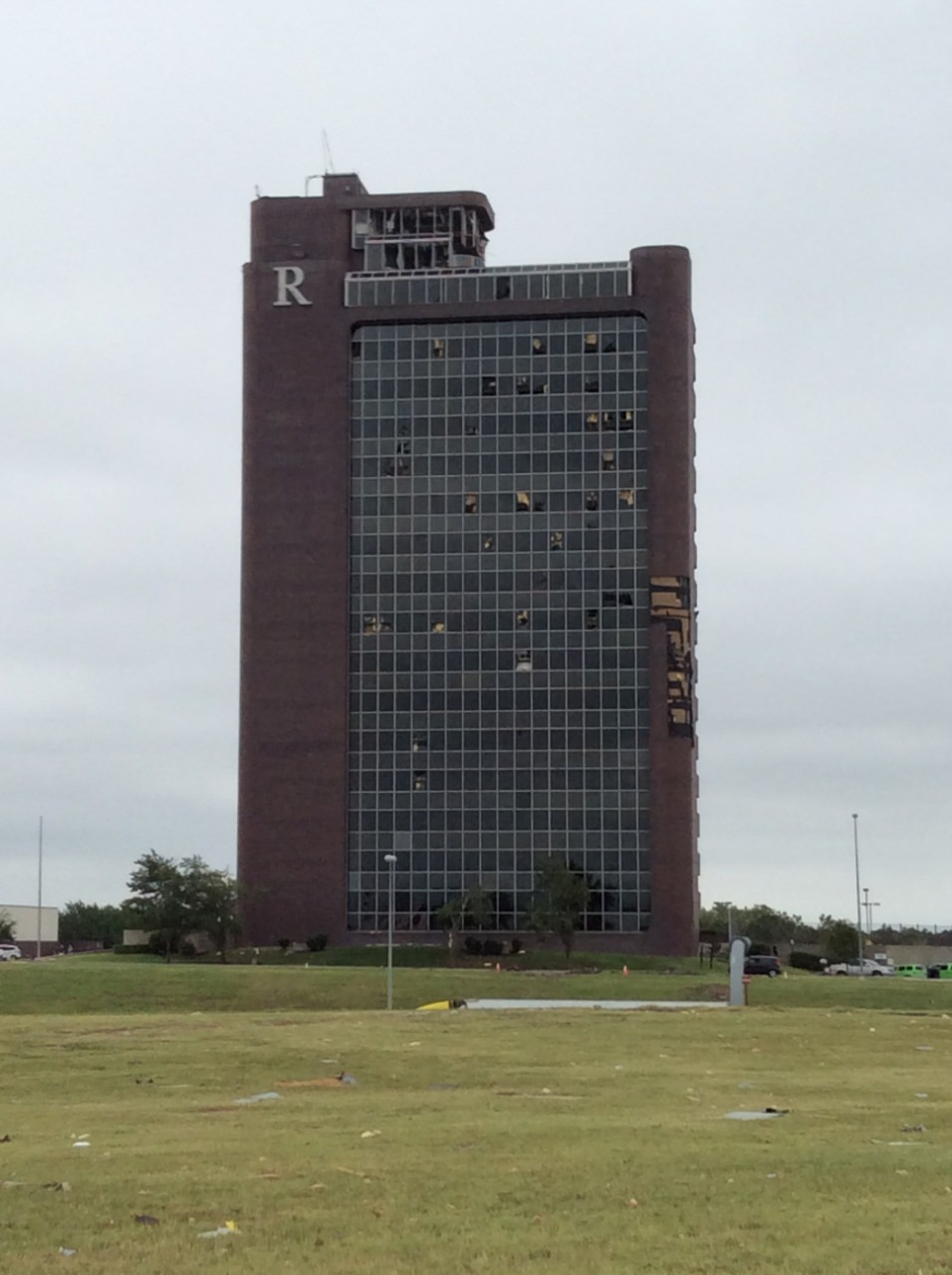
EF2 damage to the 18-story Remington Tower office building in Tulsa, Oklahoma.

During the early morning hours of August 6, a high-end EF2 tornado touched down in the southeastern part of Tulsa, Oklahoma, forming along the leading edge of a bow echo within the eastern segment of a mesoscale convective complex that began sweeping through the state on the evening of August 5. The tornado began at 1:19 a.m. CDT (06:19 UTC) in a residential neighborhood east of South Harvard Avenue and south of East 36th Street South. Damage at the beginning of the path consisted of snapped trees and tree limbs and was rated EF1. The tornado crossed South Yale Avenue, causing additional EF1 damage as wooden power poles were snapped. A nearby 10-story mid-rise Charles Schwab Corporation office building had minor exterior damage and a few broken windows. The tornado then reached high-end EF2 strength as it moved down East 41st Street, damaging or destroying numerous businesses in this area. A T.G.I. Friday's location in the Highland Plaza shopping district sustained collapse of its roof and exterior walls, and at least 8 people had to be rescued from that location. A dentist's office sustained major structural damage, while a Chipotle, a Whataburger, and an AT&T store had their roofs ripped off. The tornado caused infrastructure damage to the BOK Financial Corporation's operations center, disabling its online, mobile and automated telephone systems. Several other businesses and structures sustained major damage in this area, a large billboard was blown over, and vehicles were flipped. Damage to ten of the affected businesses in the Highland Plaza district was so severe that city management designated them to be condemned. Just past this area, the tornado struck the 18-story Remington Tower office building along Skelly Drive. The tower sustained major damage to its facade and exterior, and had many windows blown out. A nearby hotel was also damaged. Continuing eastward, the tornado entered an industrial area of southeastern Tulsa. An industrial building along East 42nd Street sustained EF2 damage, losing its roof and large portions of its masonry exterior walls. Beyond this point, the tornado weakened to EF1 intensity as it moved along an east-southeasterly path through industrial areas, causing minor to moderate damage to warehouses and industrial buildings. Structures in this area had roofing and paneling removed, and some had portions of exterior walls blown out. Power poles were snapped as well. Continuing at EF1 strength, the tornado crossed South Memorial Drive and impacted a residential neighborhood, where trees and tree limbs were downed and homes had windows blown out. The EF1 tornado then crossed South Mingo Road into another industrial area, where several industrial buildings were damaged. Crossing U.S. Route 64 and following East 51st Street South to the east, the tornado continued to produce EF1 damage as a motel and an industrial building sustained damage, and several trees and power poles were downed before the tornado dissipated near the intersection of East 51st Street South and South 145th East Avenue. A total of 30 people were injured by the tornado.

The rare August tornado, the first to hit the Tulsa area since 1958 (and only the third to strike the area since official tornado records began being kept in 1950), injured 26 people – with two experiencing serious injuries – in the eastern part of the city. Despite the presence of strong low-level rotation that was detected on radar, the Tulsa County Emergency Management Agency did not activate civil defense sirens in Tulsa proper as the local National Weather Service forecast office did not issue a tornado warning until 1:25 a.m. CDT (06:25 UTC), two minutes before it spawned an EF1 tornado that spanned a 2.9-mile-long (4.7 km) track across Broken Arrow, causing roof damage to numerous homes and bringing down several large tree limbs in the suburb. A second EF1 touched down east of Oologah at 1:32 a.m. CDT (06:32 UTC), damaging several trees, barns and one home, and downed several electrical poles. A fourth, weak tornado was later confirmed through damage surveys six miles south of Chelsea, which touched down at 2:11 a.m. (07:11 UTC) and uprooted several large trees; this tornado was rated as an EF1.

=== August 11 (China) ===
EFU	EF0	EF1	EF2	EF3	EF4	EF5
0	0	0	0	0	3	0

On August 11, three large, destructive, and slow-moving tornadoes impacted rural areas and small villages near Chifeng, Inner Mongolia in China. The first tornado was at least a mile wide, and moved along a two-mile-long path through a valley outside of Chifeng, striking the outskirts of a small village. Two large brick residences were completely leveled at this location, with masonry scattered long distances from the destroyed structures. Other nearby buildings sustained varying degrees of damage. After the first tornado dissipated, another large wedge tornado touched down in a nearby valley, leveling additional homes. As this second tornado was on the ground, another violent tornado touched down farther east in the same valley. This destructive tornado caused devastating damage in two separate villages, leveling and sweeping away dozens of brick homes. Tractors were thrown and mangled, reinforced concrete power poles were broken, trees were denuded and debarked, and branches were found impaled into walls of structures that remained standing before the third and final tornado dissipated. Five people were killed as a result of the tornadoes, all of which were rated EF4. At least 58 others were injured, some critically.

=== August 25–31 (Hurricane Harvey) ===
EFU	EF0	EF1	EF2	EF3	EF4	EF5
0	37	13	3	0	0	0

Category 4 Hurricane Harvey produced a seven-day outbreak of tornadoes across the Southern United States during and after its landfall along the Texas coast. A majority of these tornadoes were weak, though some impacted the Greater Houston area. On August 29, an EF2 tornado near Evangeline, Louisiana, area damaged vehicles, destroyed homes, and snapped or uprooted many trees. The final day of the outbreak was the most significant, with numerous tornadoes touching down across Mississippi, Alabama, and Tennessee on August 31, including two EF2 tornadoes. One of these EF2 tornadoes struck the town of Reform, Alabama, damaging or destroying several homes and mobile homes, snapping many trees, flipping vehicles, and injuring 6 people. The same tornado heavily damaged a fire station in Palmetto as well. Another EF2 tornado touched down near Holly Pond before dissipating near the city of Arab, completely destroying numerous chicken houses and downing many trees along its path. Overall, this outbreak produced 53 tornadoes and did not result in any fatalities.

== September ==
=== September 4 (United States) ===
During the overnight hours of September 4, an isolated EF2 tornado struck the town of North Robinson, Ohio, destroying detached garages and significantly damaging homes. The tornado went on to destroy multiple outbuildings and garages, snap many trees, and severely damage homes as it passed near the towns of Leesville and Crestline. One home sustained high-end EF2 damage, sustaining loss of most of its roof and collapse of a few exterior walls. Two people inside the home were injured after they were thrown from their bedroom into their yard. No other tornadoes occurred as a result of this severe weather event, though straight line winds downed many trees and power lines in upstate New York. Large hail was also reported in parts of Michigan, Minnesota, Illinois, and Kentucky.

=== September 9–11 (Hurricane Irma) ===
EFU	EF0	EF1	EF2	EF3	EF4	EF5
0	10	15	3	0	0	0

The approach and landfall of Hurricane Irma produced a small three-day outbreak of mostly weak tornadoes across parts of Florida and South Carolina. An EF2 tornado near Polk City, Florida, snapped several wooden high-power transmission poles. Another brief but destructive EF2 tornado near Crescent ripped the roofs and top floor exterior walls from several large condominium buildings, while a third EF2 rolled a pickup truck and damaged homes near Mims. Four weak tornadoes caused damage in the Charleston, South Carolina area as well, including one that caused damage to a control tower at Joint Base Charleston. A total of 28 tornadoes were confirmed.

== October ==
=== October 7–8 (Hurricane Nate) ===
EFU	EF0	EF1	EF2	EF3	EF4	EF5
0	7	7	2	0	0	0

On October 8, multiple weak tornadoes touched down across parts of Alabama and Mississippi as a result of Hurricane Nate. This included a brief EF0 tornado that touched down in the eastern part of Mobile, Alabama, shattering windows, toppling a large billboard, causing minor damage to businesses, and downing tree limbs. Further north, another EF0 tornado tracked through the eastern portions of Madison, Wisconsin, downing many trees and power lines. Falling trees caused major damage to some structures, while others sustained minor roof and fascia damage. More intense tornado activity occurred on October 8, with the most significant tornado of the event being a long-track EF2 that destroyed multiple trailers in a trailer park near Laurens, South Carolina, destroyed a home, and caused damage in Glenn Springs before dissipating. A high-end EF2 tornado also passed near Pickens, damaging or destroying multiple homes and mobile homes, snapping or uprooting many trees, and damaging a communications tower. Moderate damage to also occurred in Tryon, North Carolina, as a result of an EF1 tornado. A total of 16 tornadoes were confirmed as a result of this outbreak, which resulted in no fatalities.

=== October 21–23 (United States) ===
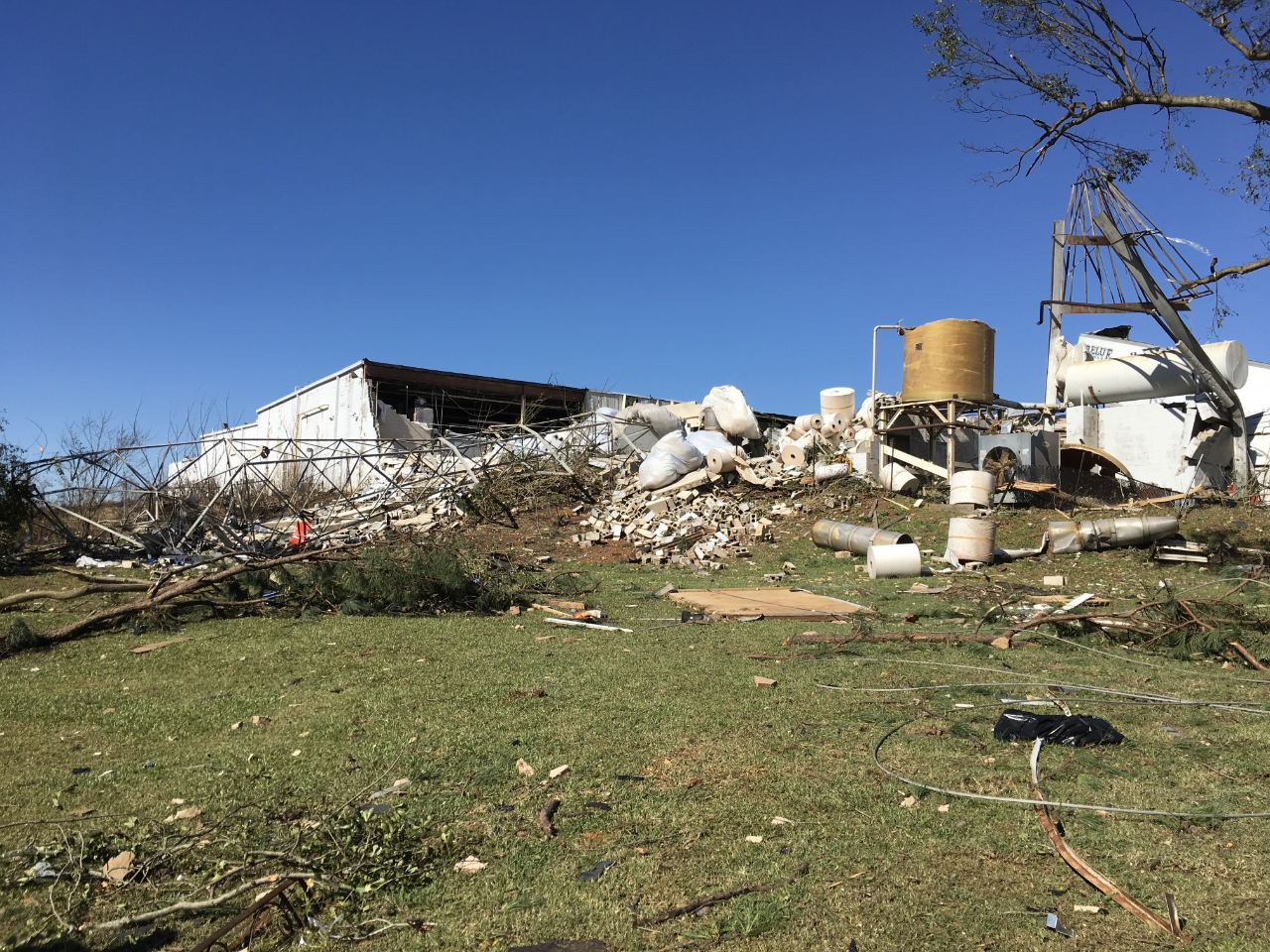
EF2 damage to a metal truss tower and an industrial building in Spartanburg, South Carolina.

EFU	EF0	EF1	EF2	EF3	EF4	EF5
3	1	14	3	0	0	0

On the night of October 21, several tornadoes were reported in Oklahoma. One of these was a high-end EF1 that impacted the southwestern fringes of Norman in the vicinity of I-35 and SH-9. The tornado caused damage to trees and power poles, and damaged or destroyed several metal sheds and outbuildings. The touchdown of the tornado was seen on live television as storm chasers Val and Amy Castor from KWTV-DT were in the immediate vicinity of the tornado when it formed, causing light damage to their vehicle as it passed directly overhead. The tornado also did damage to part of the Riverwind Casino, which at the time was hosting a Beach Boys concert attended by Oklahoma governor Mary Fallin. Despite the damage, no injuries were reported. Another EF1 tornado struck the town of Seminole, where there was considerable damage to homes, businesses, trees, and a church. Tornado activity on October 22 was limited to a single EF1 that injured one person and caused moderate damage to a large industrial building and some trailers in Pascagoula, Mississippi; the second EF1 tornado to cause damage in Pascagoula in the year 2017. The most significant tornado activity occurred on October 23, as an EF1 tornado downed many trees and damaged several homes in Spartanburg, South Carolina. After the initial Spartanburg tornado dissipated, a second, stronger EF2 tornado caused major damage to industrial buildings, a metal truss tower, trees and power poles, a gas station, and vehicles in the northwestern part of the city, and injured one person. Another EF2 tornado damaged or destroyed multiple homes, destroyed outbuildings, and snapped trees and power poles near Gaffney. In North Carolina, an EF2 tornado destroyed a hangar and several planes at the airport in Hickory. The Hickory tornado also downed hundreds of trees onto structures and vehicles. Overall, this outbreak produced 21 tornadoes and did not result in any fatalities. However, it did produce the largest lightning flash in history, at 515 mi (829 km) from Texas to Kansas City, and was verified on July 31, 2025.

== November ==
=== November 5 (United States) ===
EFU	EF0	EF1	EF2	EF3	EF4	EF5
0	3	16	5	0	0	0

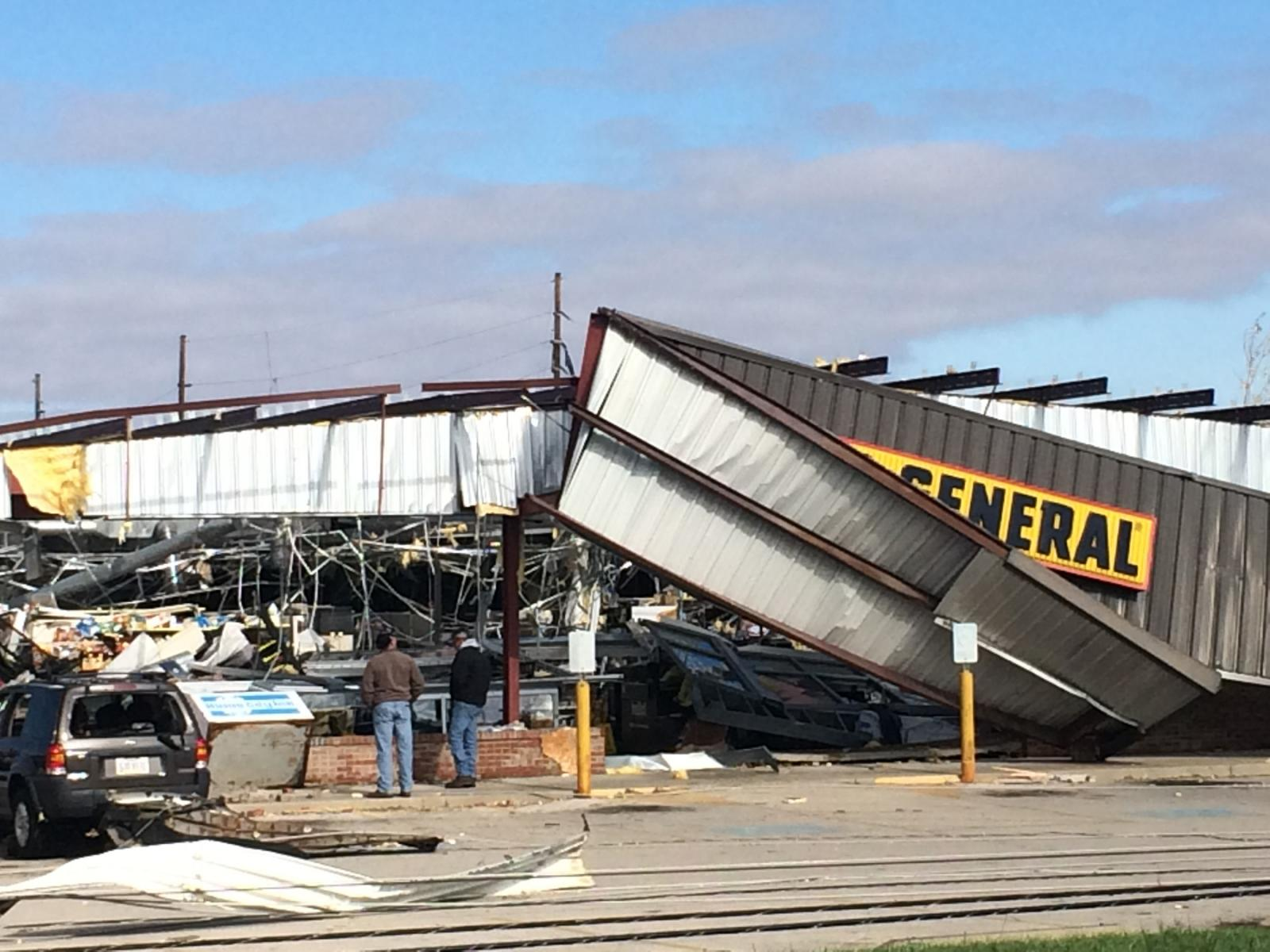
EF2 damage to a Dollar General store in Celina, Ohio.

As multiple areas of low pressure rode along a strong cold front stretching across the Central United States and Ohio River Valley, the Storm Prediction Center issued an enhanced risk of severe weather on November 5 across parts of Illinois, Indiana, and Ohio. This outlook included a 10% risk of tornadoes across the enhanced risk area. Later that day, severe thunderstorm began to organize in a modestly unstable, highly sheared environment spanning from Missouri to New York, resulting in a multitude of hail and wind reports. Rotating supercell thunderstorms developed across parts of the Ohio Valley late that afternoon and evening, and multiple tornadoes began touching down and causing damage. Ohio sustained the most significant impacts during the event, with multiple towns sustaining direct hits from tornadoes, some of which were strong and destructive. The first significant tornado of the event was a long-track, high-end EF2 wedge tornado that passed near the Indiana towns of Dunkirk and Portland before crossing into Ohio and dissipating west of Celina. This damaging tornado heavily damaged or destroyed many homes and manufactured homes, destroyed numerous barns, garages, storage buildings, and outbuildings, damaged a church, an auto repair shop, and a gas plant, snapped numerous trees and power poles, and injured one person along its path. A separate EF2 tornado struck Celina shortly after the initial tornado dissipated, blowing out windows and ripping the roofs off of businesses in town, heavily damaging a large factory building, snapping numerous trees and power poles, and injuring eight people. An EF1 tornado caused considerable damage to sheds, trees, and homes in West Lodi, while another EF1 damaged trees, the roofs of homes, and a heavy equipment sales business in South Vienna. One EF2 tornado struck Galion, tearing the roof off of a house, snapping trees, and severely damaging industrial buildings in town, while another brief EF2 obliterated a barn near Republic. The town of Williamsfield sustained major impacts from an EF2 tornado, where frame homes sustained loss of roofs and exterior walls, and multiple mobile homes were completely destroyed. An EF1 tornado also struck Calcutta, where trees were downed and air conditioning units were ripped from the roof of a YMCA. Further to the east, an EF1 tornado moved through parts of Erie, Pennsylvania, damaging trees, homes, businesses, and a shopping plaza. Tornadoes also struck towns in Indiana that afternoon and evening, including a brief EF1 tornado that damaged roofs and trees in Muncie, and another EF1 that damaged structures in downtown Salem.

In addition to the tornadoes, this severe weather outbreak produced many reports of destructive straight-line winds, including 90-MPH thunderstorm winds that damaged restaurants, industrial buildings, businesses, mobile homes, and Findlay High School in Findlay, Ohio. In northeastern Ohio, a large and powerful macroburst with winds of up to 105-MPH caused significant damage in numerous towns and communities throughout Lorain, Medina, Cuyahoga, Summit, Portage and Geauga counties. These destructive winds shattered windows, stripped roofing and siding from homes, damaged a fire department communications tower, ripped the steeple off of a church, and downed countless trees and power poles across the affected area, with many landing on homes and vehicles. A microburst containing 100-MPH winds also impacted Boardman, where businesses were damaged by the strong winds, and numerous homes were damaged by falling trees, some significantly. With 16 tornadoes in Ohio alone, the November 5 outbreak marked the second-largest in state history for the month, behind only the Tornado outbreak of November 9–11, 2002. Overall, this outbreak produced 24 tornadoes and did not result in any fatalities.

=== November 22 (Indonesia) ===
On November 22, a destructive tornado occurred in a densely populated area of Sidoarjo Regency in East Java, causing damage to 600 homes, with some homes sustaining major damage including roofs and exterior walls ripped off. Thirty-five people were injured by the tornado.

== December ==
=== December 5 (United States) ===
EFU	EF0	EF1	EF2	EF3	EF4	EF5
0	0	2	1	0	0	0

Severe thunderstorms moving through the state of Missouri on December 5 resulted in scattered reports of hail, damaging winds, and a few tornadoes. An EF1 tornado injured two people when it struck and destroyed a mobile home near Higbee. This same tornado caused considerable damage to a frame home, and tossed a pickup truck into a field. The strongest tornado of the event was an EF2 tornado near Wayland that snapped wooden power poles, destroyed a salt shelter building, and injured one person when a semi-truck was overturned. This tornado crossed into Iowa before dissipating. A third tornado caused EF1 damage to a home, an outbuilding, and some trees near Brumley as well.

=== December 16 (Philippines) ===
A tornado spawned by Tropical Storm Kai-tak (Urduja) struck Caibiran, Biliran resulted in a landslide that buried multiple houses and killing 14 peoples.

=== December 19–20 (United States) ===
EFU	EF0	EF1	EF2	EF3	EF4	EF5
0	3	4	2	0	0	0

The final tornado event of 2017 consisted of a small outbreak of 9 tornadoes that affected the Southern United States on December 19 and 20. Two EF2 tornadoes touched down in Texas on December 19, the first of which downed trees and concrete power poles near the town of Rusk, as well as damaging several roofs and outbuildings. The other was a large wedge tornado which blew a home off of its block foundation, snapped many trees, and lofted a small boat near Reklaw. Scattered weak tornadoes occurred in Texas, Louisiana, Mississippi, Alabama and Georgia on December 20. An EF1 tornado damaged trees, barns, and roofs in the rural Texas community of Gist. The town of DeQuincy, Louisiana sustained considerable damage due to an EF1 tornado, where hangars were damaged at a small airport, a batting cage awning was blown down, homes and businesses sustained roof and window damage, many trees and power lines were downed, and a pavilion was destroyed at a local sports complex. No injuries or fatalities occurred as a result of this outbreak.

=== December 31 (Indonesia) ===
A strong and destructive tornado struck Bojonangka Village, Pemalang, Central Java. It caused significant damage to numerous homes, with 50 homes that were largely destroyed and 159 others that were badly damaged. The tornado also swept away a poorly built rice mill. The tornado itself injured 21 people but didn't result in any fatalities.

== See also ==
- Weather of 2017
- Tornado
  - Tornadoes by year
  - Tornado records
  - Tornado climatology
  - Tornado myths
- List of tornado outbreaks
  - List of F5 and EF5 tornadoes
  - List of F4 and EF4 tornadoes
  - List of North American tornadoes and tornado outbreaks
  - List of 21st-century Canadian tornadoes and tornado outbreaks
  - List of European tornadoes and tornado outbreaks
  - List of tornadoes and tornado outbreaks in Asia
  - List of Southern Hemisphere tornadoes and tornado outbreaks
  - List of tornadoes striking downtown areas
  - List of tornadoes with confirmed satellite tornadoes
- Tornado intensity
  - Fujita scale
  - Enhanced Fujita scale
  - International Fujita scale
  - TORRO scale
