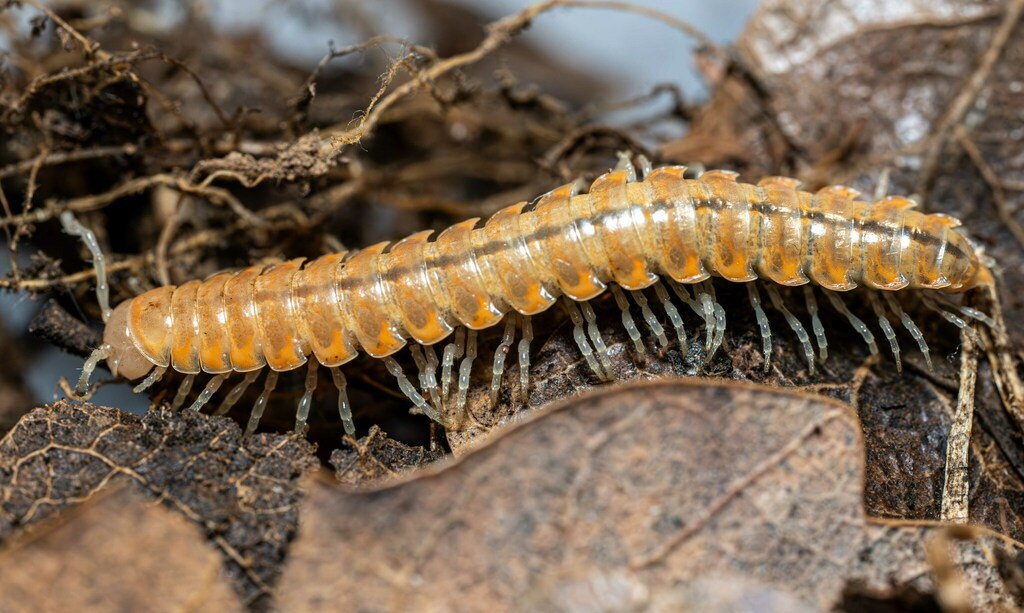

Scientific classification
- Kingdom: Animalia
- Phylum: Arthropoda
- Subphylum: Myriapoda
- Class: Diplopoda
- Order: Polydesmida
- Family: Xystodesmidae
- Genus: Anombrocheir
- Species: A. spinosa

Binomial name
- Anombrocheir spinosa Buckett & Gardner, 1969

= Anombrocheir spinosa =

Species of millipede

Anombrocheir spinosa is a species of Xystodesmid millipede endemic to the inland coastal range of California. The species was described by John S. Buckett and Michael R. Gardner in 1969 based on samples collected by the two in 1965 at a locality near Leesville, California in 1965.

== Description ==
Anombrocheir spinosa is a member of the tribe Xystocheirini and as with other members of this tribe, is generally light colored. The background color is white to yellowish-grey with yellow to orange colored paranota. The species appears similar to the common Xystocheirini species, Xystocheir dissecta, but is smaller in size and can be readily distinguished based on the shape of the gonopod. The gonopods of Anombrocheir are composed primarily of the large club-like telopodite, which lacks secondary processes.

== Range ==
The species is found in a small localized population in Glenn and Colusa counties California. The population lies in the Great Valley Sequence of the Inner Coastal Range of California. The area is dominated by oak grasslands, and the millipedes are primarily found in thick oak duff.
