= Middletown, Crawford County, Ohio =

Unincorporated community in Crawford County, Ohio, United States

Coordinates: 40°46′25″N 82°47′31″W

Middletown is an unincorporated community in Jefferson Township, Crawford County, Ohio, United States.

== History ==
Middletown was laid out circa 1835.
