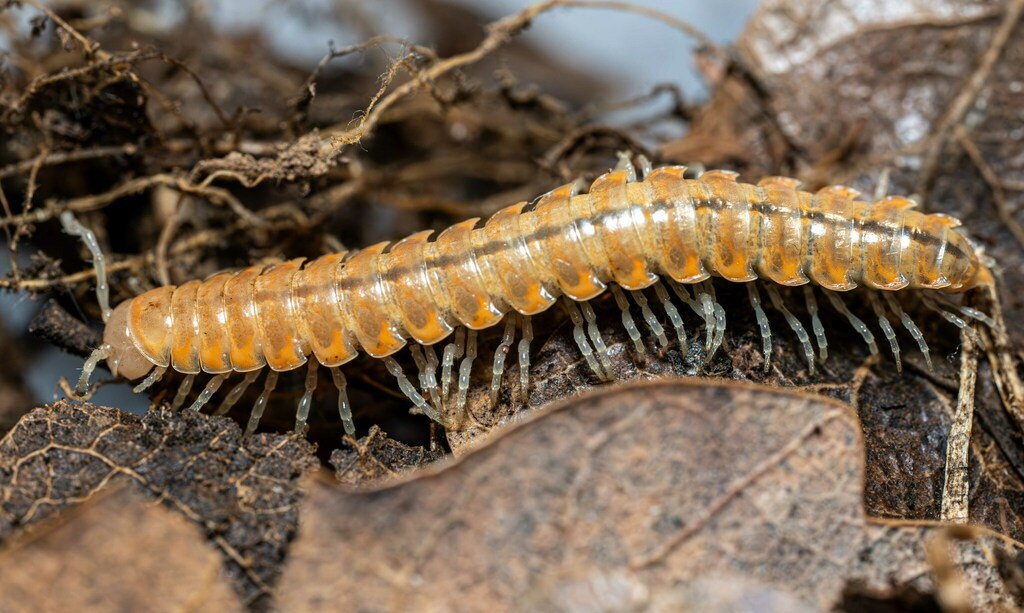
- Anombrocheir spinosa from Colusa County California

Scientific classification
- Kingdom: Animalia
- Phylum: Arthropoda
- Subphylum: Myriapoda
- Class: Diplopoda
- Order: Polydesmida
- Family: Xystodesmidae
- Genus: Anombrocheir; Buckett & Gardner, 1969

= Anombrocheir =

Genus of millipedes

Anombrocheir is a genus of millipedes belonging to the family Xystodesmidae. The species of this genus are endemic to California where they are found in the inner Coastal mountain range of Colusa and Glenn counties.

The genus was erected by J.S. Buckett and M.R. Gardner in 1969 based on samples of the type species, A. spinosa, collected in December 1965.

The species of this genus are differentiated from those of other Xystocheirini by the presence of an exceptionally large telopodite of the male gonopod.

Species:

- Anombrocheir bifurcata Buckett & Gardner, 1969
- Anombrocheir spinosa Buckett & Gardner, 1969
