= Jefferson Township, Crawford County, Ohio =

Township in Ohio, US

- Township
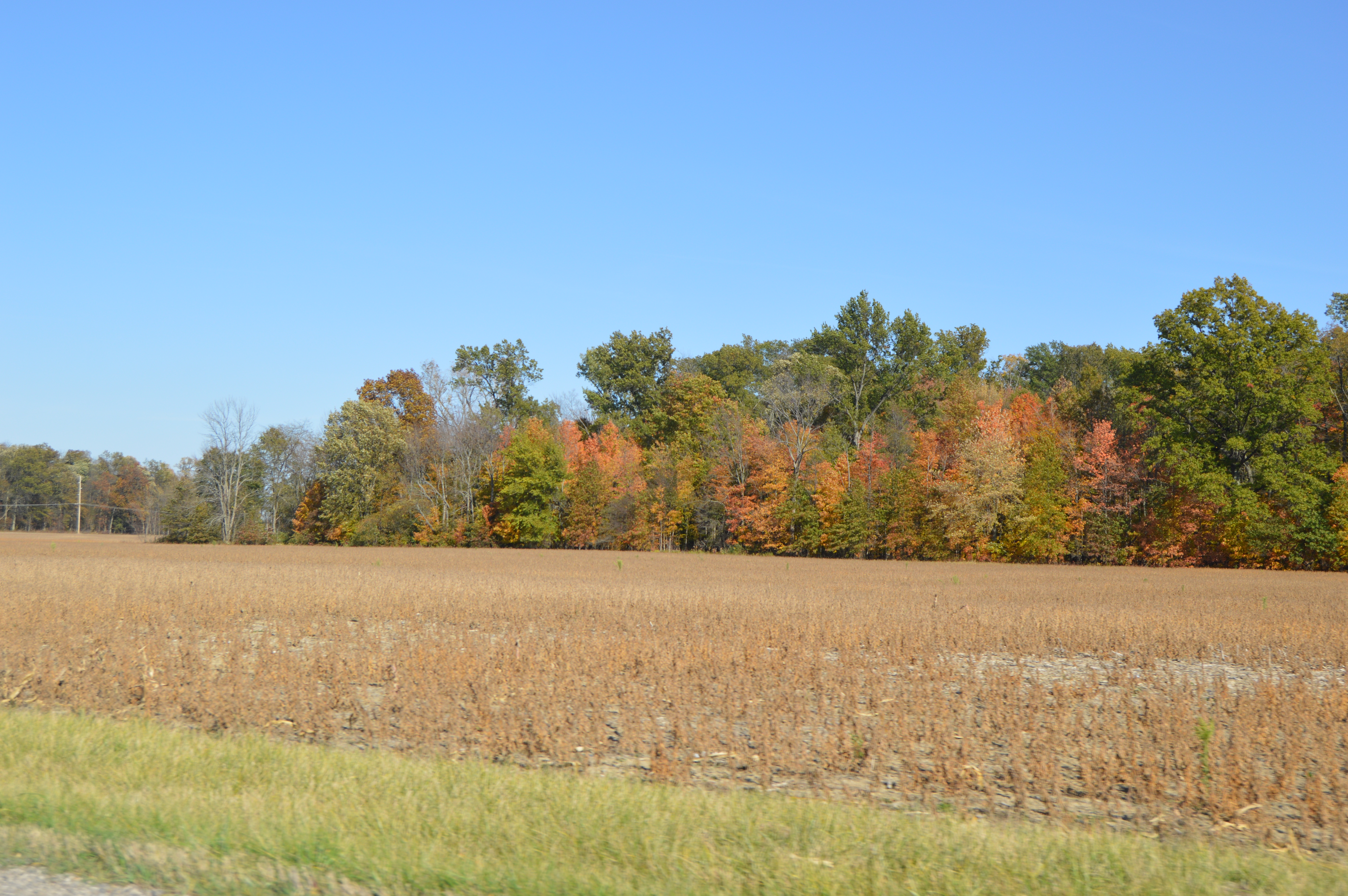
- Fields south of North Robinson

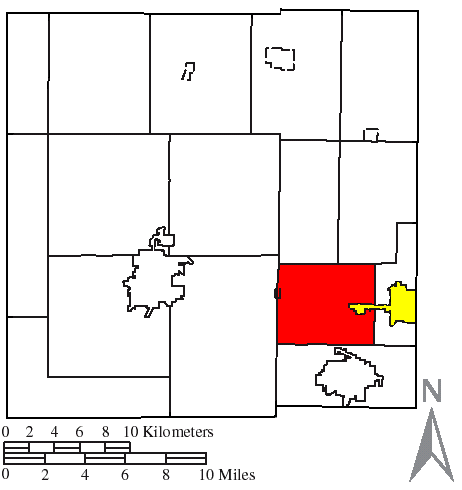
- Location of Jefferson Township (red) in Crawford County, next to the city of Crestline (yellow)
- Coordinates: 40°47′6″N 82°48′5″W
- Country: United States
- State: Ohio
- County: Crawford

Area
  - Total: 18.9 sq mi (49.0 km^{2})
  - Land: 18.8 sq mi (48.7 km^{2})
  - Water: 0.077 sq mi (0.2 km^{2})
- Elevation: 1,112 ft (339 m)

Population (2020)
  - Total: 1,562
  - Density: 83.1/sq mi (32.1/km^{2})
- Time zone: UTC-5 (Eastern (EST))
  - Summer (DST): UTC-4 (EDT)
- FIPS code: 39-38570
- GNIS feature ID: 1085940
- Website: https://www.jeffersontownship.us/

Jefferson Township is one of the sixteen townships of Crawford County, Ohio, United States. As of the 2020 census there were 1,562 people living in the township.

== Geography ==
Located in the southeastern part of the county, it borders the following townships:

- Sandusky Township - north
- Vernon Township - northeast
- Jackson Township - east
- Polk Township - south
- Whetstone Township - west

Parts of two villages are located in Jefferson Township: Crestline in the east, and North Robinson in the west. Jefferson Township contains the unincorporated communities of Leesville and Middletown.

== Name and history ==
Jefferson Township was established in 1873, it is the youngest township in Crawford County. It was named for President Thomas Jefferson.

It is one of twenty-four Jefferson Townships statewide.

== Government ==
The township is governed by a three-member board of trustees, who are elected in November of odd-numbered years to a four-year term beginning on the following January 1. Two are elected in the year after the presidential election and one is elected in the year before it. There is also an elected township fiscal officer, who serves a four-year term beginning on April 1 of the year after the election, which is held in November of the year before the presidential election. Vacancies in the fiscal officership or on the board of trustees are filled by the remaining trustees.
