= Leeville =

Leeville may refer to:

- Leeville, New South Wales
- Leeville, Tennessee
- Leeville, Louisiana

== See also ==
- Leesville (disambiguation)
