= Leesville, California =

Unincorporated community in California, United States

Leesville
- Unincorporated community
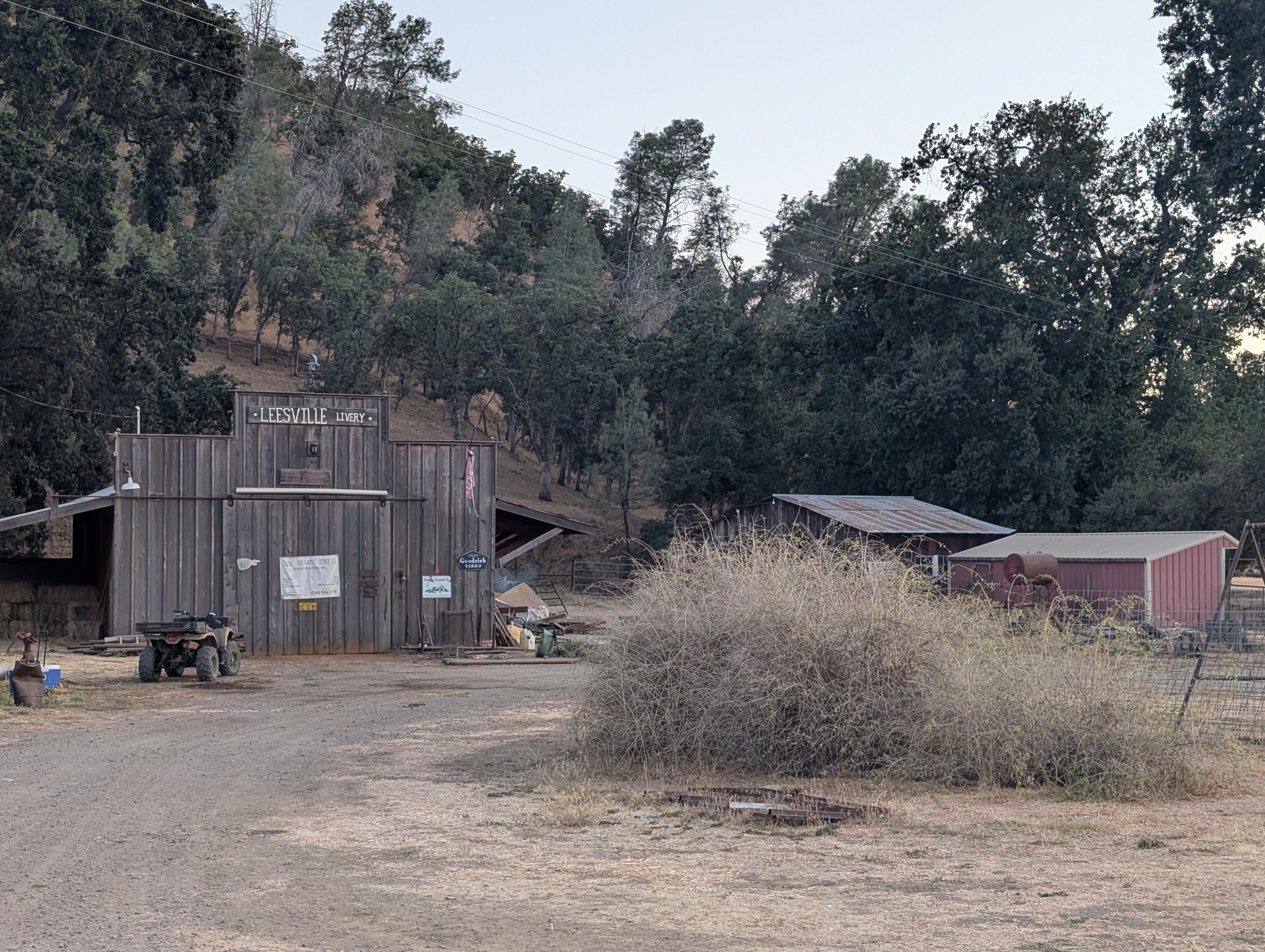
- Leesville

- Location in California Leesville (the United States)
- Coordinates: 39°11′22″N 122°25′25″W
- Country: United States
- State: California
- County: Colusa
- Elevation: 1,427 ft (435 m)

Leesville is an unincorporated community in Colusa County, California, United States. It lies at an elevation of 1434 feet (437 m). It had a post office from 1874 to 1920. The town is named for Lee Harl, a pioneer landowner.

== Climate ==
According to the Köppen Climate Classification system, Leesville has a warm-summer Mediterranean climate, abbreviated "Csa" on climate maps.

== Bibliography ==
- U.S. Geological Survey Geographic Names Information System: Leesville, California
