= Leesville, Crawford County, Ohio =

Unincorporated community in Ohio, U.S.

Coordinates: 40°47′43″N 82°47′18″W

Leesville is an unincorporated community in Jefferson Township, Crawford County, Ohio, in the United States.

== History ==
Leesville was laid out in 1829 by Robert Lee, Sr., and named for him.
