= Lykens Township =

Lykens Township may refer to the following townships in the United States:

- Lykens Township, Pennsylvania
- Lykens Township, Crawford County, Ohio
