= New Winchester =

New Winchester may refer to:

- New Winchester, Indiana
- New Winchester, Ohio (in Crawford County)
