= Brokensword, Ohio =

Unincorporated community in Ohio, U.S.

Coordinates: 40°54′25″N 83°00′58″W

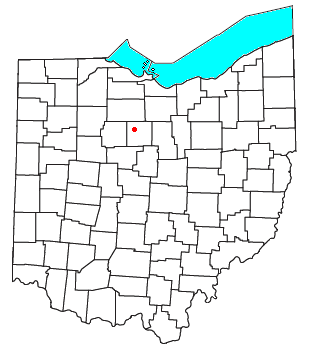
Location of Brokensword, Ohio

Brokensword is an unincorporated community on the border between the Holmes and Lykens townships of Crawford County, Ohio, United States. Located at the intersection of the concurrent State Routes 19 and 100 with Brokensword Road, it is six miles north and two miles west (9½ km and 3¼ km respectively) of the city of Bucyrus, the county seat. Broken Sword Creek flows a short distance to the south of the community.

A post office called Brokensword was established in 1837, and remained in operation until 1906. The community takes its name from nearby Broken Sword Creek.
