= Sandusky Township, Ohio =

Sandusky Township, Ohio may refer to:

- Sandusky Township, Crawford County, Ohio
- Sandusky Township, Richland County, Ohio
- Sandusky Township, Sandusky County, Ohio
