= Clara Ayres =

American nurse

- Born: Clara Edith Work; September 16, 1880; Venice Township, Seneca County, Ohio
- Died: May 17, 1917 (aged 36); USS Mongolia, Atlantic Ocean
- Burial place: Venice Township, Seneca County, Ohio
- Spouse: Wayland D. Ayres (1903–06)
- Parents: James Clarkson Work (father); Mary Jane Work (nee Smith) (mother)

Clara Ayres (September 16, 1880 – May 17, 1917) was an American nurse who joined the United States Army during the First World War. Ayres and Helen Burnett Wood were the first two women to be killed while serving in the United States military, following an explosion on USS Mongolia on May 17, 1917.

== Career ==
Clara Edith Work (later Ayres) was born on September 16, 1880, in Venice Township, Seneca County, Ohio. She was the eldest of three children of James and Mary Work. She was brought up in Attica within the Township. On September 30, 1903, she married grocery store owner Wayland D. Ayres, who died three years later from tetanus from a workplace injury. She attempted to run the store herself, but was eventually employed as a clerk at a dry foods store nearby.

In 1910, she traveled to Chicago to study nursing at the school there. She graduated in 1913 and worked until 1917 as an instructor at the Cook County Hospital. That year she responded to the American Red Cross appeal for trained nurses for the First World War. She was accepted, and was transferred on board the USS Mongolia to travel to France. While sailing the crew underwent a firing practice. The medical staff being transferred watched from near one of the guns, when it exploded, killing Ayres and a fellow nurse Helen Burnett Wood.

The ship returned their bodies to New York City. The two were the first women to be killed while serving in the United States military. Following a service by the Red Cross on May 23, Ayres' body was taken back to Ohio where she was buried with military honors on May 26. A bronze plaque honoring her was placed at the Chicago Training School for Nurses. The deaths made national news, and the United States Navy was accused in the United States Congress of covering up how the women were killed. A historical marker was placed near her grave in 2017.
