= Cranberry Township, Ohio =

Township in Ohio

Cranberry Township, Crawford County, Ohio
- Township
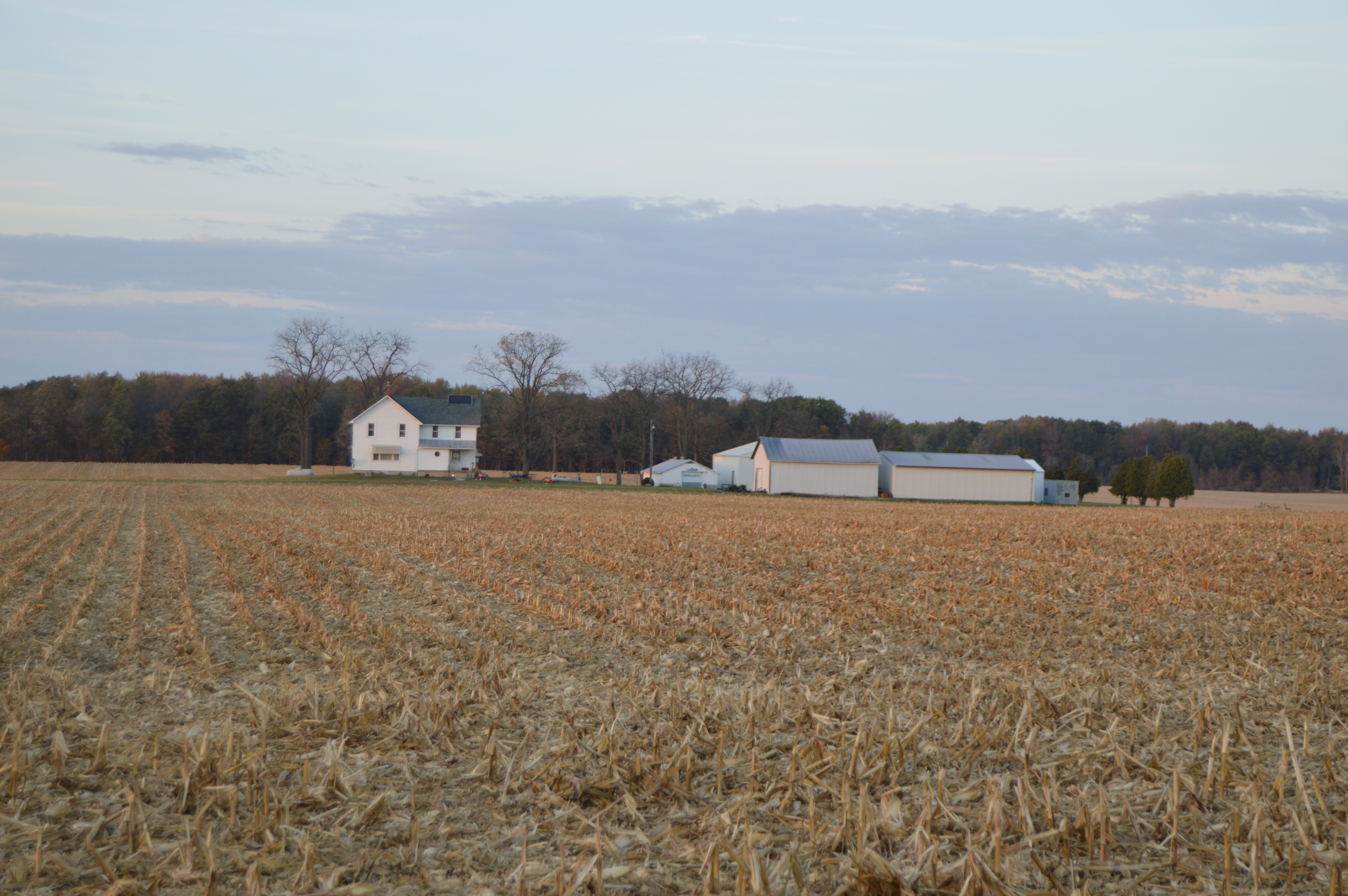
- Farmstead on Swabb Road, west of New Washington

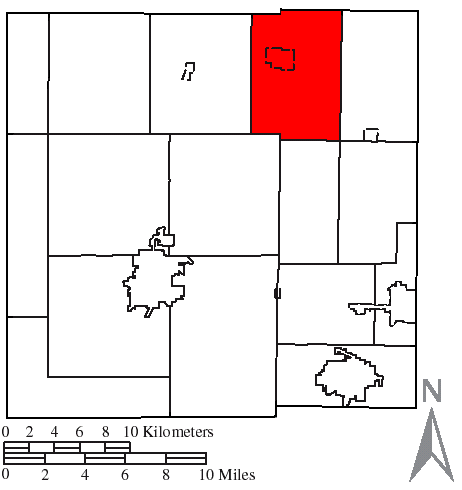
- Location of Cranberry Township in Crawford County
- Coordinates: 40°57′14″N 82°50′57″W
- Country: United States
- State: Ohio
- County: Crawford

Area
  - Total: 28.18 sq mi (72.98 km^{2})
  - Land: 28.17 sq mi (72.95 km^{2})
  - Water: 0.012 sq mi (0.03 km^{2})
- Elevation: 994 ft (303 m)

Population (2020)
  - Total: 1,477
  - Density: 52.44/sq mi (20.25/km^{2})
- Time zone: UTC-5 (Eastern (EST))
  - Summer (DST): UTC-4 (EDT)
- FIPS code: 39-19134
- GNIS feature ID: 1085935

Cranberry Township is one of the sixteen townships of Crawford County, Ohio. As of the 2020 census there were 1,477 people living in the township.

== Geography ==
Located in the northeastern part of the county, it borders the following townships:

- Richmond Township, Huron County – northeast
- Auburn Township – east
- Vernon Township – southeast corner
- Sandusky Township – south
- Liberty Township – southwest
- Chatfield Township – west
- Venice Township, Seneca County – northwest

The village of New Washington is located in northwestern Cranberry Township.

== Name and history ==
Cranberry Township was founded in the 1820s. It was named from a cranberry marsh in the southwestern part.

It is the only Cranberry Township statewide.

== Government ==
The township is governed by a three-member board of trustees, who are elected in November of odd-numbered years to a four-year term beginning on the following January 1. Two are elected in the year after the presidential election and one is elected in the year before it. There is also an elected township fiscal officer, who serves a four-year term beginning on April 1 of the year after the election, which is held in November of the year before the presidential election. Vacancies in the fiscal officership or on the board of trustees are filled by the remaining trustees.
