= Sulphur Springs, Ohio =

Coordinates: 40°52′20″N 82°52′35″W

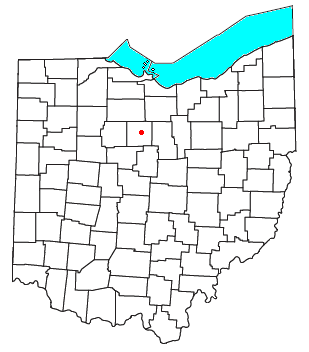
Location of Sulphur Springs, Ohio

Sulphur Springs is a census-designated place (CDP) in eastern Liberty Township, Crawford County, Ohio, United States. As of the 2020 United States census it had a population of 197. It has a post office with the ZIP code 44881. It is located along State Route 98 northeast of the city of Bucyrus, the county seat of Crawford County.

== History ==
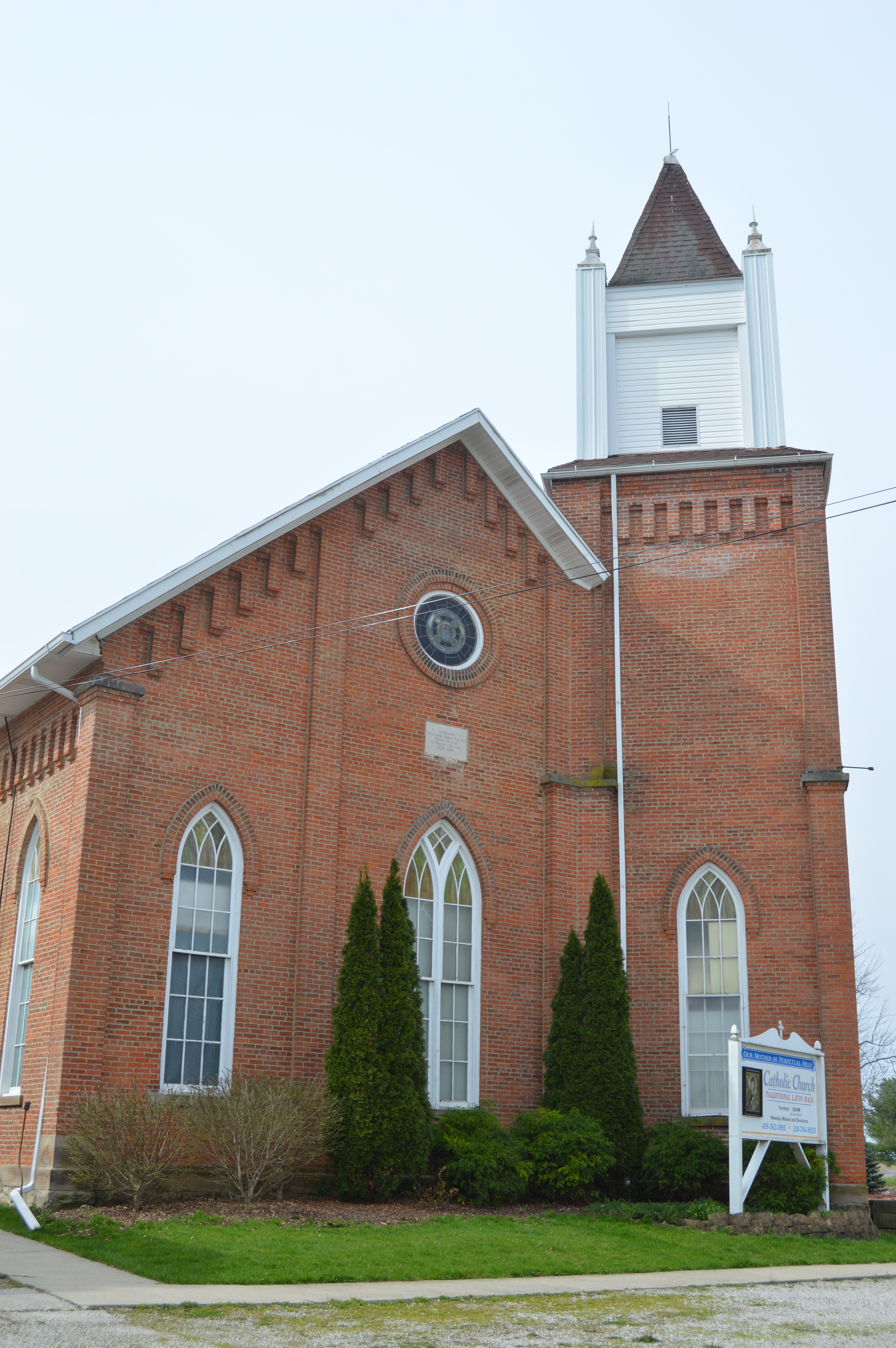
Sedevacantist Catholic church (CMRI) on South Street

In 1833, John Slifer platted Sulphur Springs under the name Annapolis. However, the name didn't stick among the locals, who called it Slifertown to honor its founder.

The name Sulphur Spring was assigned by the postal department when a post office was opened in the community, because of sulphur mineral springs near the original town site. In 1890, the postal department added an "s" to the name to distinguish it from several other settlements in Ohio also named Sulphur Spring.

The post office called Sulphur Springs has been in operation since 1890, while the post office under the name Sulphur Spring opened in 1846 and closed in 1890.

The early population of the community was predominantly German, with early industries in the settlement including a hoop and barrel factory, wagon and buggy shops and tanneries. The first school in Sulphur Springs was a log schoolhouse. In 1837, the school was moved to a new location closer to the spring. A frame school was built in 1857, and was in use until a brick school was built in 1873 for $4,000. The 1923 consolidation of the school district led to the present school building.

The school remained a high school until it became part of the Colonel Crawford Local School District in 1960.
