= Bucyrus Township, Ohio =

Township in Ohio, US

- Township
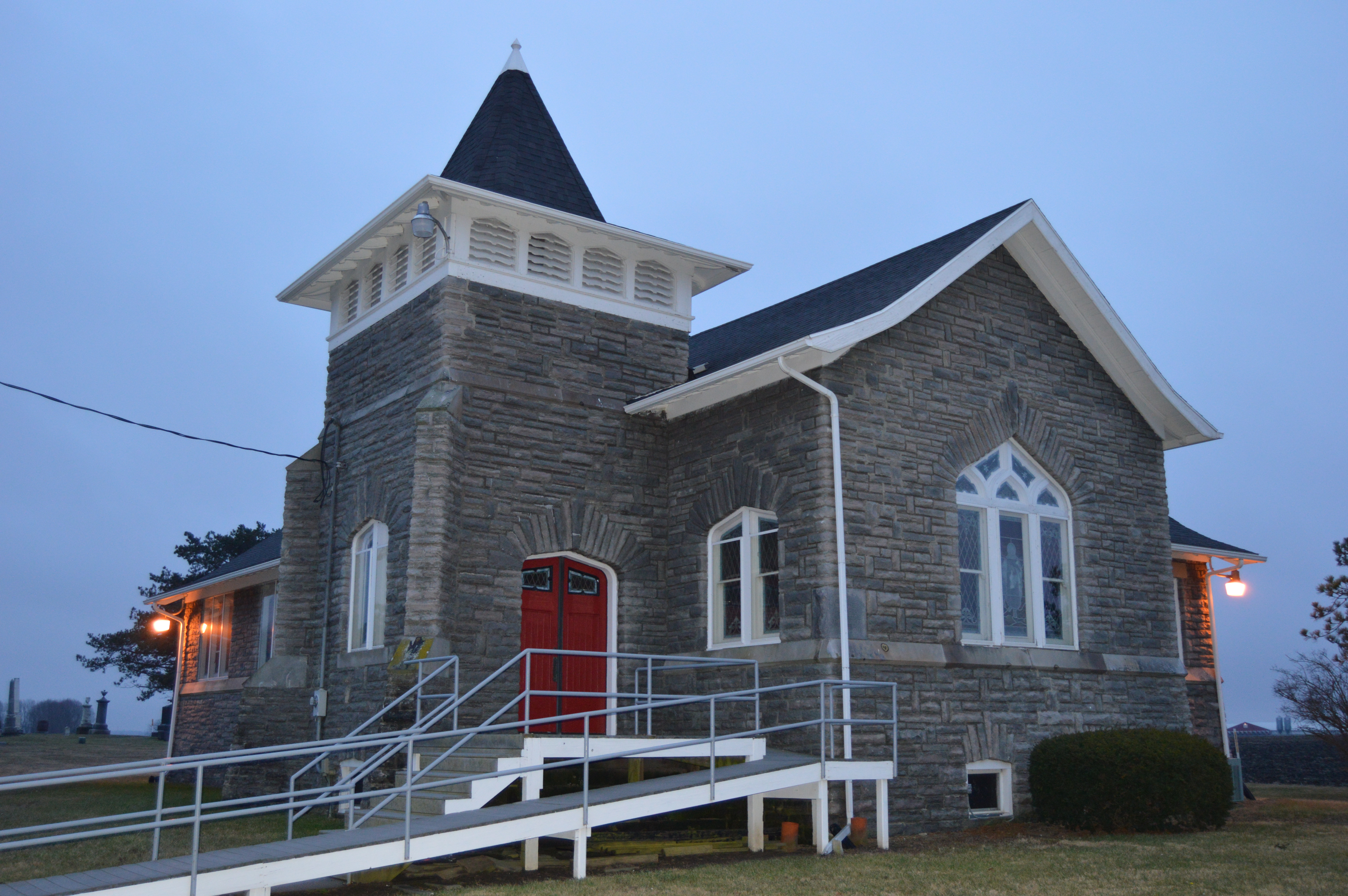
- Lighthouse Baptist Church

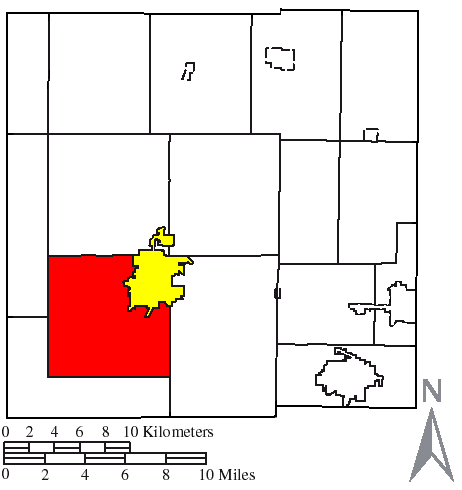
- Location of Bucyrus Township (red) in Crawford County, next to the city of Bucyrus (yellow)
- Coordinates: 40°47′6″N 83°0′34″W
- Country: United States
- State: Ohio
- County: Crawford

Area
  - Total: 31.4 sq mi (81.3 km^{2})
  - Land: 31.3 sq mi (81.1 km^{2})
  - Water: 0.077 sq mi (0.2 km^{2})
- Elevation: 991 ft (302 m)

Population (2020)
  - Total: 821
  - Density: 26.2/sq mi (10.1/km^{2})
- Time zone: UTC-5 (Eastern (EST))
  - Summer (DST): UTC-4 (EDT)
- ZIP code: 44820
- Area code: 419
- FIPS code: 39-10044
- GNIS feature ID: 1085933

Bucyrus Township is one of the sixteen townships of Crawford County, Ohio, United States. As of the 2020 census the population was 821.

== Geography ==
Located in the southwestern part of the county, it borders the following townships:

- Holmes Township - north
- Liberty Township - northeast corner
- Whetstone Township - east
- Dallas Township - southwest
- Tod Township - northwest

Most of the city of Bucyrus, the county seat of Crawford County, is located in northeastern Bucyrus Township.

== Name and history ==
It is the only Bucyrus Township statewide.

== Government ==
The township is governed by a three-member board of trustees, who are elected in November of odd-numbered years to a four-year term beginning on the following January 1. Two are elected in the year after the presidential election and one is elected in the year before it. There is also an elected township fiscal officer, who serves a four-year term beginning on April 1 of the year after the election, which is held in November of the year before the presidential election. Vacancies in the fiscal officership or on the board of trustees are filled by the remaining trustees.
