= Chatfield Township, Ohio =

Township in Ohio, US

- Township
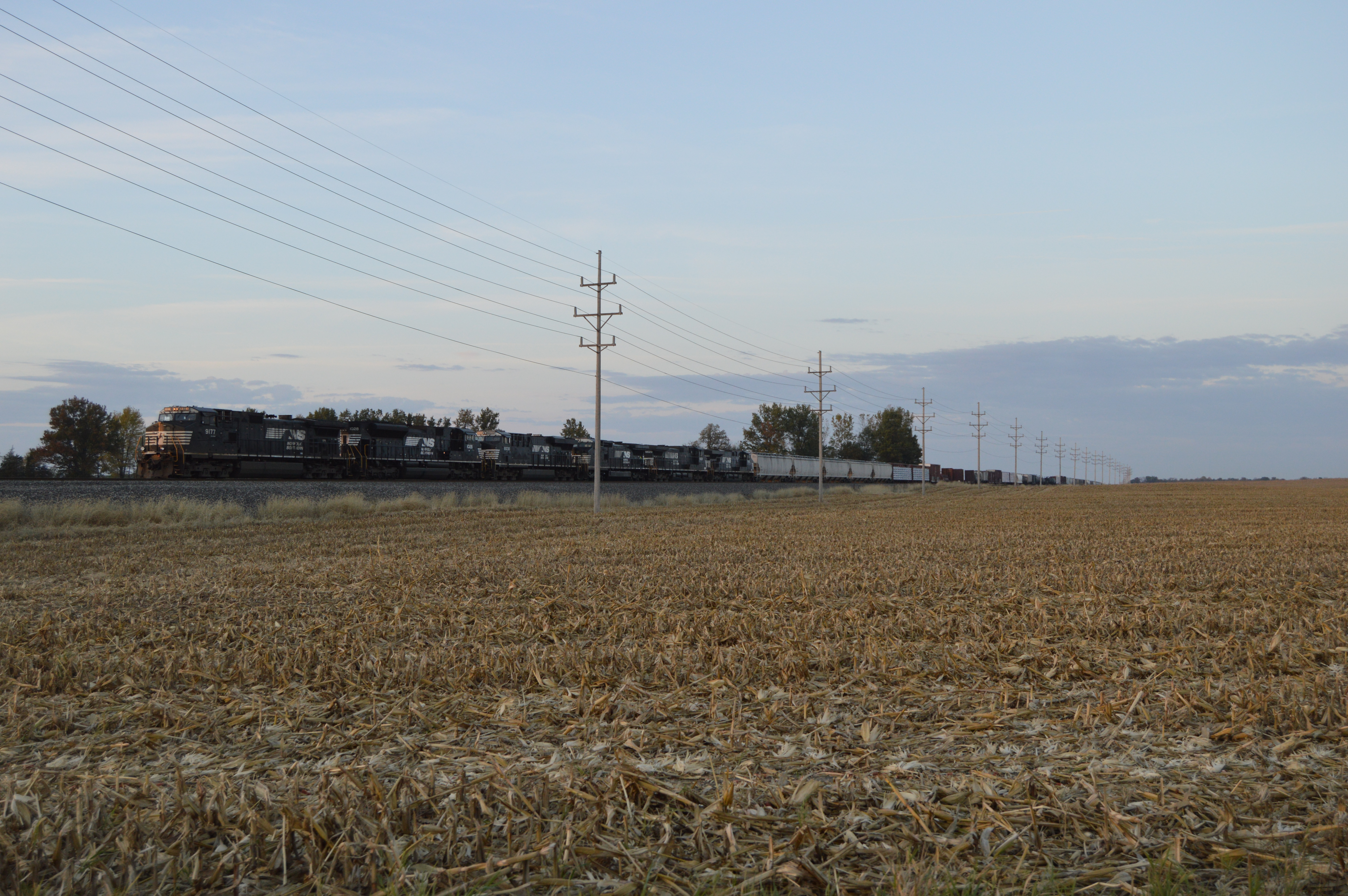
- Rail line and fields north of Chatfield

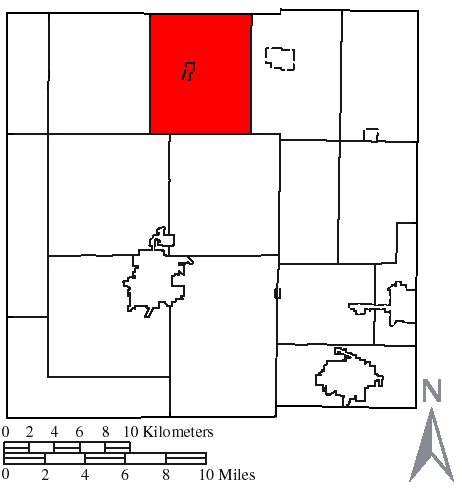
- Location of Chatfield Township in Crawford County
- Coordinates: 40°57′15″N 82°56′16″W
- Country: United States
- State: Ohio
- County: Crawford

Area
  - Total: 29.97 sq mi (77.62 km^{2})
  - Land: 29.94 sq mi (77.55 km^{2})
  - Water: 0.031 sq mi (0.08 km^{2})
- Elevation: 981 ft (299 m)

Population (2020)
  - Total: 696
  - Density: 23.2/sq mi (8.97/km^{2})
- Time zone: UTC-5 (Eastern (EST))
  - Summer (DST): UTC-4 (EDT)
- ZIP code: 44825
- Area code: 419
- FIPS code: 39-13708
- GNIS feature ID: 1085934

Chatfield Township is one of the sixteen townships of Crawford County, Ohio, United States. As of the 2020 census there were 696 people living in the township.

== Geography ==
Located in the northern part of the county, it borders the following townships:

- Venice Township, Seneca County - north
- Cranberry Township - east
- Liberty Township - south
- Holmes Township - southwest
- Lykens Township - west
- Bloom Township, Seneca County - northwest

The village of Chatfield is located in the center of Chatfield Township.

== Name and history ==
Chatfield Township was likely named for Silas and Oliver Chatfield, pioneer settlers.

It is the only Chatfield Township statewide.

== Government ==
The township is governed by a three-member board of trustees, who are elected in November of odd-numbered years to a four-year term beginning on the following January 1. Two are elected in the year after the presidential election and one is elected in the year before it. There is also an elected township fiscal officer, who serves a four-year term beginning on April 1 of the year after the election, which is held in November of the year before the presidential election. Vacancies in the fiscal officership or on the board of trustees are filled by the remaining trustees.
