= Caroline, Ohio =

Caroline
- Unincorporated community
- Location within the state of Ohio
- Coordinates: 41°03′08″N 82°53′37″W
- Country: United States
- State: Ohio
- County: Seneca
- Township: Venice
- Elevation: 929 ft (283 m)
- Time zone: UTC-5 (Eastern (EST))
  - Summer (DST): UTC-4 (EDT)
- ZIP codes: 44807
- GNIS feature ID: 1048583

Caroline is an unincorporated community in Venice Township, Seneca County, Ohio, United States. It is located along State Route 4, just south of Attica. The community is served by the Attica (44807) post office.

== History ==
Caroline was laid out in 1826. The community was named after Caroline, the daughter of a pioneer settler. A post office was established at Caroline in 1827, and discontinued in 1830.
