= Whetstone Township, Crawford County, Ohio =

Township in Ohio, US

- Township
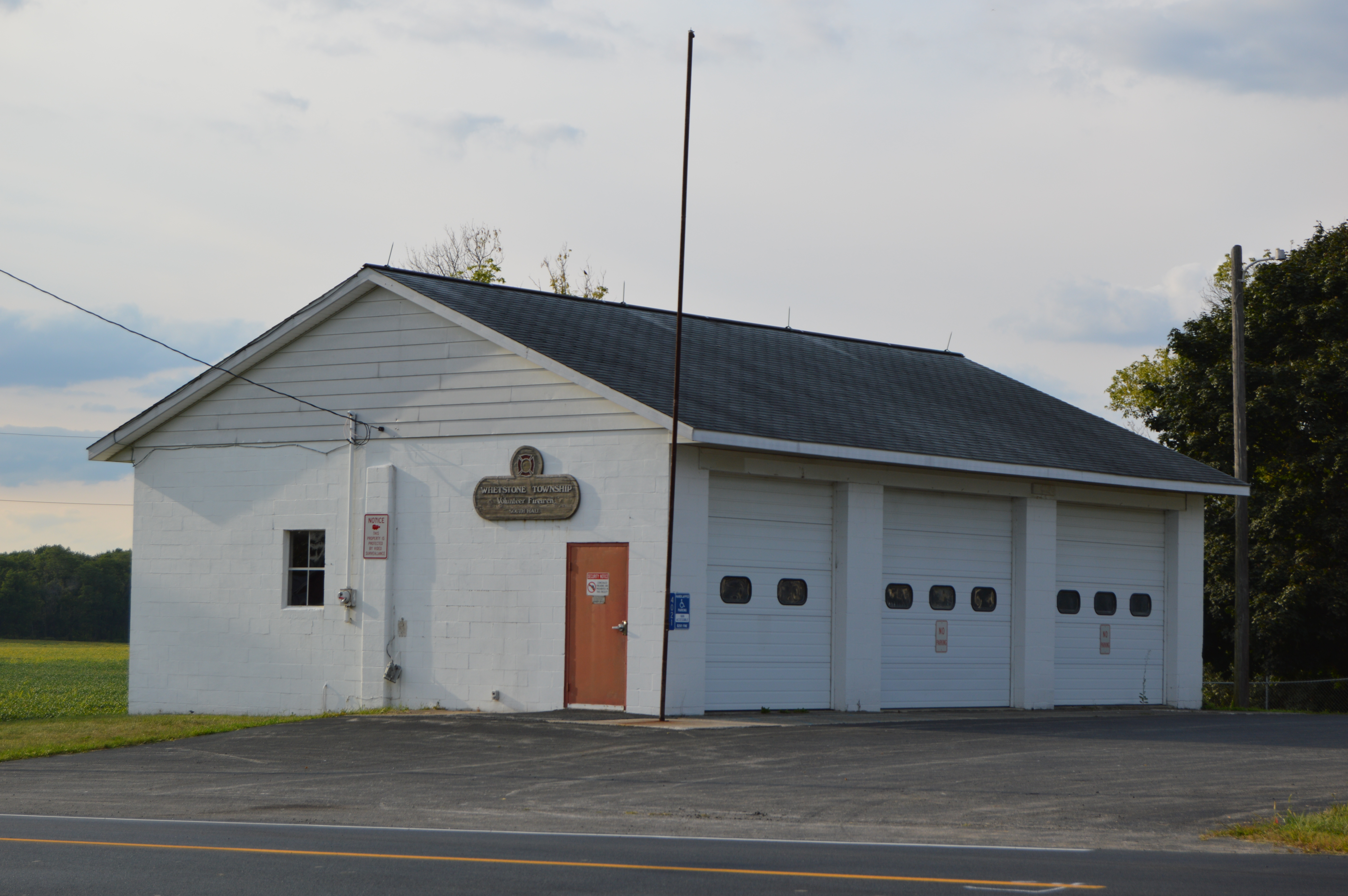
- Fire station in New Winchester

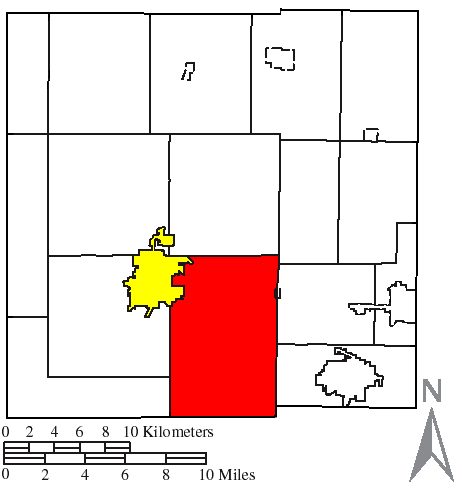
- Location of Whetstone Township (red) in Crawford County, next to the city of Bucyrus (yellow)
- Coordinates: 40°46′17″N 82°54′51″W
- Country: United States
- State: Ohio
- County: Crawford

Area
  - Total: 40.8 sq mi (105.7 km^{2})
  - Land: 40.7 sq mi (105.5 km^{2})
  - Water: 0.077 sq mi (0.2 km^{2})
- Elevation: 1,040 ft (317 m)

Population (2020)
  - Total: 1,931
  - Density: 47.41/sq mi (18.30/km^{2})
- Time zone: UTC-5 (Eastern (EST))
  - Summer (DST): UTC-4 (EDT)
- FIPS code: 39-84644
- GNIS feature ID: 1085948

Whetstone Township is one of the sixteen townships of Crawford County, Ohio, United States. As of the 2020 census the population was 1,931.

== Geography ==
Located in the southern part of the county, it borders the following townships:

- Liberty Township - north
- Sandusky Township - northeast
- Jefferson Township - east
- Polk Township - southeast, north of Washington Township
- Washington Township, Morrow County - southeast, south of Polk Township
- Tully Township, Marion County - south
- Scott Township, Marion County - southwest corner
- Dallas Township - west, south of Bucyrus Township
- Bucyrus Township - west, north of Dallas Township
- Holmes Township - northwest corner

Two municipalities are located in Whetstone Township: part of the village of North Robinson in the northeast, and part of the city of Bucyrus, the county seat of Crawford County, in the northwest. The unincorporated community of New Winchester is located in the township's south.

== Name and history ==
Whetstone Township was formed in the 1820s. It was named from Whetstone Creek.

It is the only Whetstone Township statewide.

== Government ==
The township is governed by a three-member board of trustees, who are elected in November of odd-numbered years to a four-year term beginning on the following January 1. Two are elected in the year after the presidential election and one is elected in the year before it. There is also an elected township fiscal officer, who serves a four-year term beginning on April 1 of the year after the election, which is held in November of the year before the presidential election. Vacancies in the fiscal officership or on the board of trustees are filled by the remaining trustees.
