= Holmes Township, Crawford County, Ohio =

Township in Ohio, US

Holmes Township
- Township
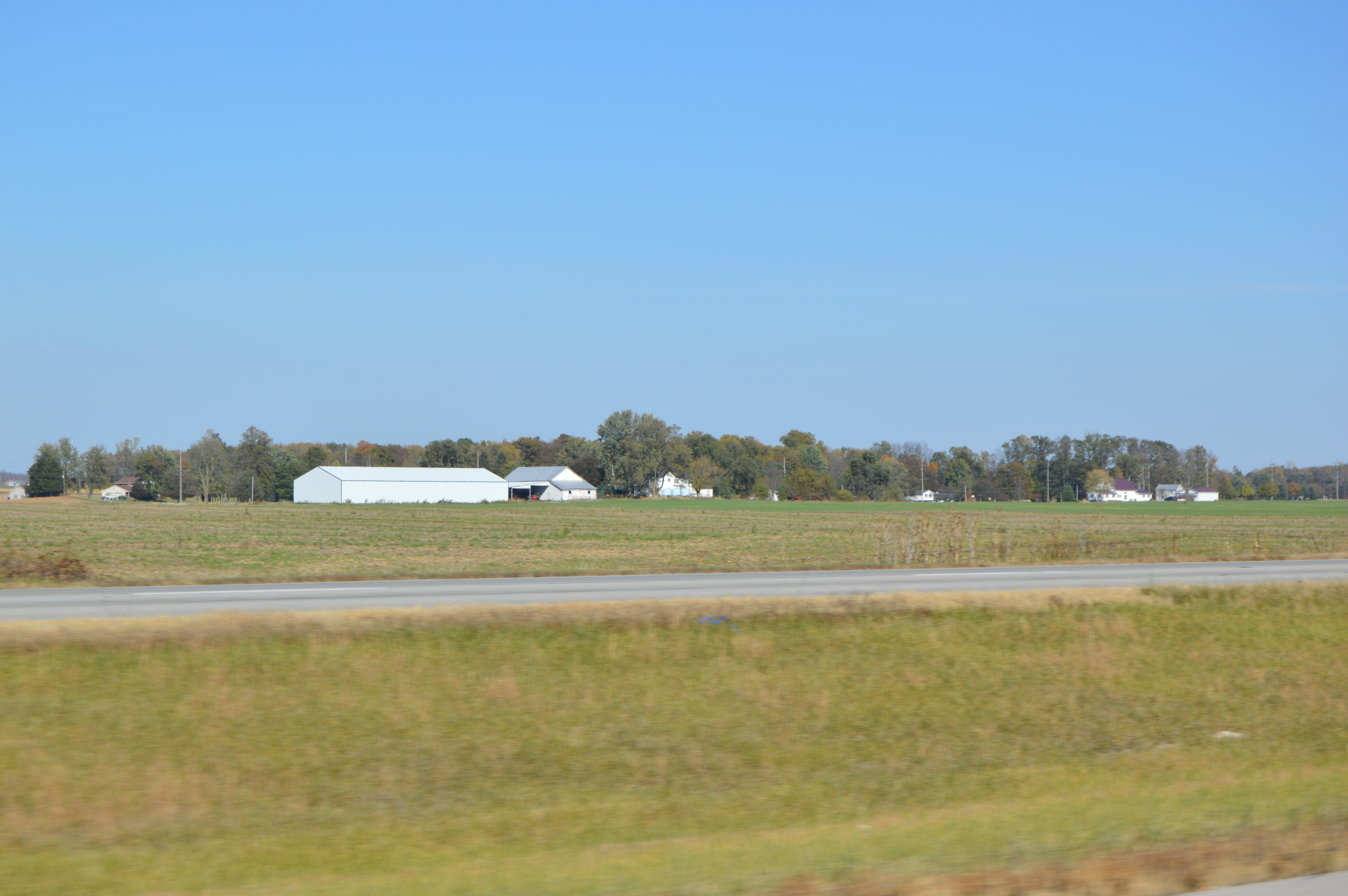
- Along U.S. Route 30 northwest of Bucyrus

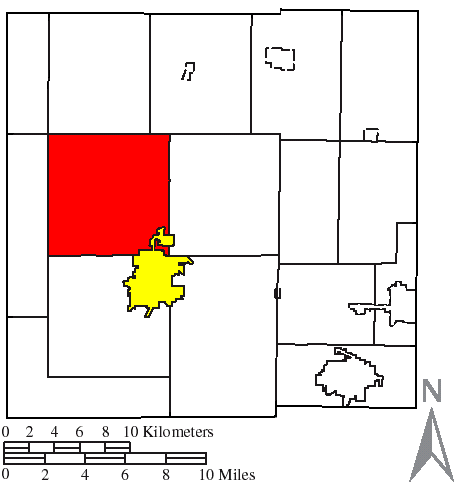
- Location of Holmes Township (red) in Crawford County, next to the city of Bucyrus (yellow)
- Coordinates: 40°51′22″N 83°0′20″W
- Country: United States
- State: Ohio
- County: Crawford

Area
  - Total: 35.1 sq mi (91.0 km^{2})
  - Land: 35.1 sq mi (90.9 km^{2})
  - Water: 0.039 sq mi (0.1 km^{2})
- Elevation: 997 ft (304 m)

Population (2020)
  - Total: 1,246
  - Density: 35.5/sq mi (13.7/km^{2})
- Time zone: UTC-5 (Eastern (EST))
  - Summer (DST): UTC-4 (EDT)
- FIPS code: 39-35980
- GNIS feature ID: 1085938

Holmes Township is one of the sixteen townships of Crawford County, Ohio, United States. As of the 2020 census the population was 1,246.

== Geography ==
Located in the northwestern part of the county, it borders the following townships:

- Lykens Township - north
- Chatfield Township - northeast
- Liberty Township - east
- Whetstone Township - southeast corner
- Bucyrus Township - south
- Tod Township - west
- Texas Township - northwest corner

A small part of the city of Bucyrus, the county seat of Crawford County, is located in southeastern Holmes Township, and the unincorporated community of Brokensword lies on the border with Lykens Township.

== Name and history ==
Holmes Township was named for Deputy Surveyor General Samuel Holmes.

It is the only Holmes Township statewide.

== Government ==
The township is governed by a three-member board of trustees, who are elected in November of odd-numbered years to a four-year term beginning on the following January 1. Two are elected in the year after the presidential election and one is elected in the year before it. There is also an elected township fiscal officer, who serves a four-year term beginning on April 1 of the year after the election, which is held in November of the year before the presidential election. Vacancies in the fiscal officership or on the board of trustees are filled by the remaining trustees.
