= Brandywine Creek (Broken Sword Creek tributary) =

Location
- Country: United States of America

Physical characteristics
- Source
  - location: Crawford County, Ohio
  - coordinates: 40°51′52″N 82°56′14″W
  - elevation: 1,015 ft (309 m)
- Mouth
  - location: Broken Sword Creek, Crawford County, Ohio
  - coordinates: 40°53′20″N 83°1′27″W
  - elevation: 951 ft (290 m)

Brandywine Creek in Crawford County, Ohio is a 6.6-mile-long (10.6 km) tributary of Broken Sword Creek.

== See also ==
- List of rivers of Ohio
