= Liberty Township, Crawford County, Ohio =

Township in Ohio, US

- Township
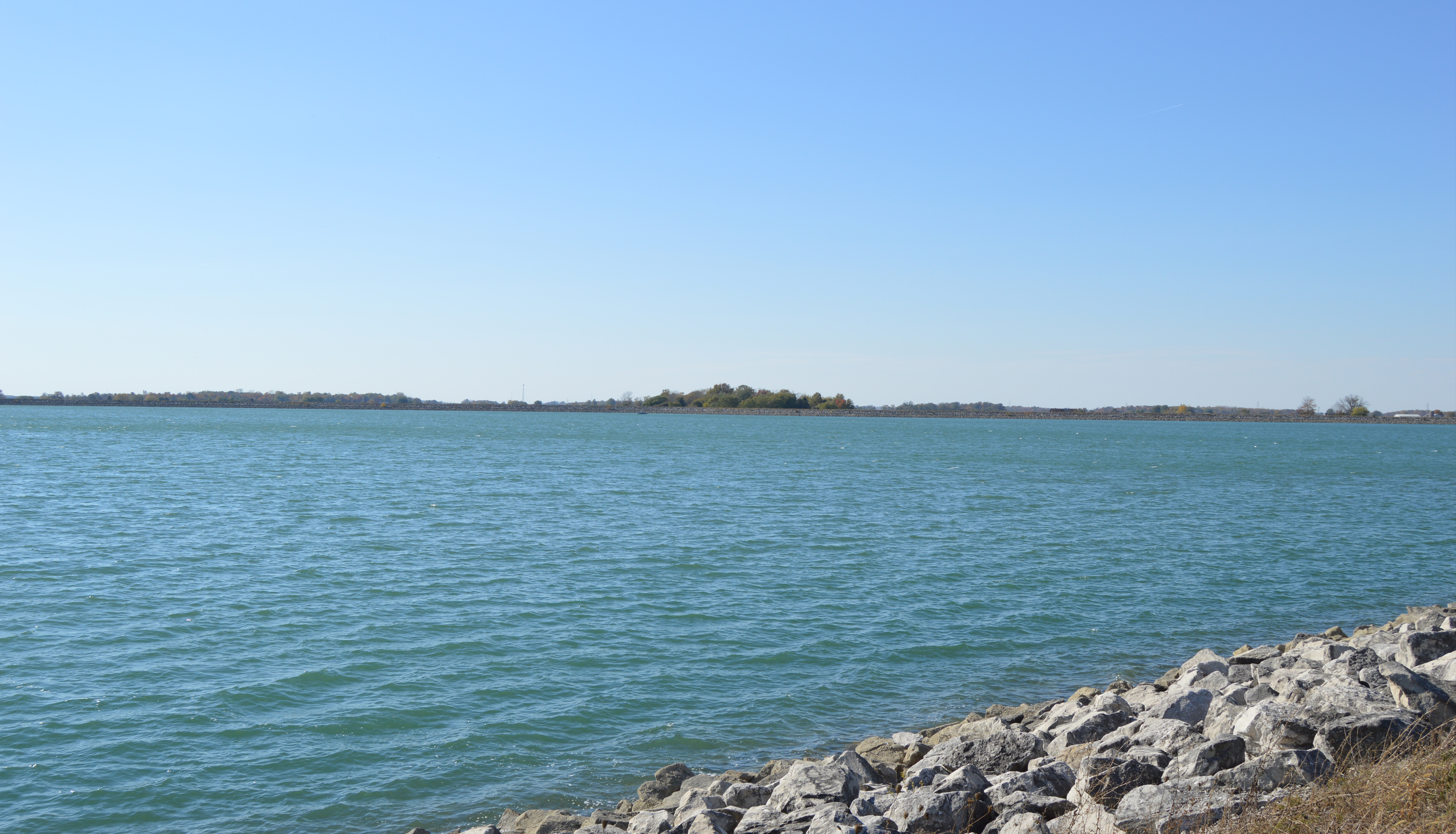
- Bucyrus Reservoir

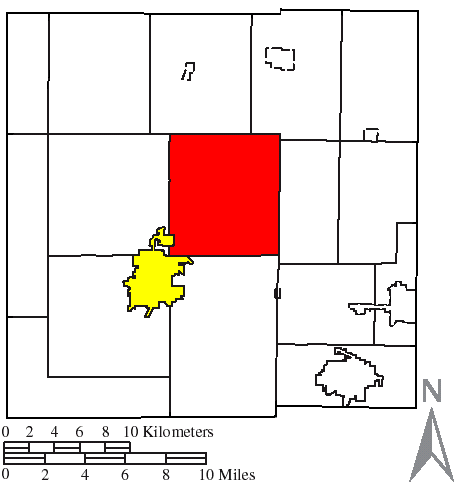
- Location of Liberty Township (red) in Crawford County, next to the city of Bucyrus (yellow)
- Coordinates: 40°52′12″N 82°54′41″W
- Country: United States
- State: Ohio
- County: Crawford

Area
  - Total: 32.7 sq mi (84.7 km^{2})
  - Land: 32.4 sq mi (83.8 km^{2})
  - Water: 0.35 sq mi (0.9 km^{2})
- Elevation: 1,030 ft (314 m)

Population (2020)
  - Total: 1,358
  - Density: 42.0/sq mi (16.2/km^{2})
- Time zone: UTC-5 (Eastern (EST))
  - Summer (DST): UTC-4 (EDT)
- FIPS code: 39-43078
- GNIS feature ID: 1085941
- Website: https://www.libertytwp.cc/

Liberty Township is one of the sixteen townships of Crawford County, Ohio, United States. As of the 2020 census the population was 1,358.

== Geography ==
Located in the center of the county, it borders the following townships:

- Chatfield Township - north
- Cranberry Township - northeast
- Sandusky Township - east
- Whetstone Township - south
- Bucyrus Township - southwest corner
- Holmes Township - west

A small part of the city of Bucyrus, the county seat of Crawford County, is located in southwestern Liberty Township, and the census-designated place of Sulphur Springs lies in the eastern part of the township.

== Name and history ==
Liberty Township was founded in 1825.

It is one of twenty-five Liberty Townships statewide.

== Government ==
The township is governed by a three-member board of trustees, who are elected in November of odd-numbered years to a four-year term beginning on the following January 1. Two are elected in the year after the presidential election and one is elected in the year before it. There is also an elected township fiscal officer, who serves a four-year term beginning on April 1 of the year after the election, which is held in November of the year before the presidential election. Vacancies in the fiscal officership or on the board of trustees are filled by the remaining trustees.
