= Bloom Township, Seneca County, Ohio =

Township in Ohio, US

- Township
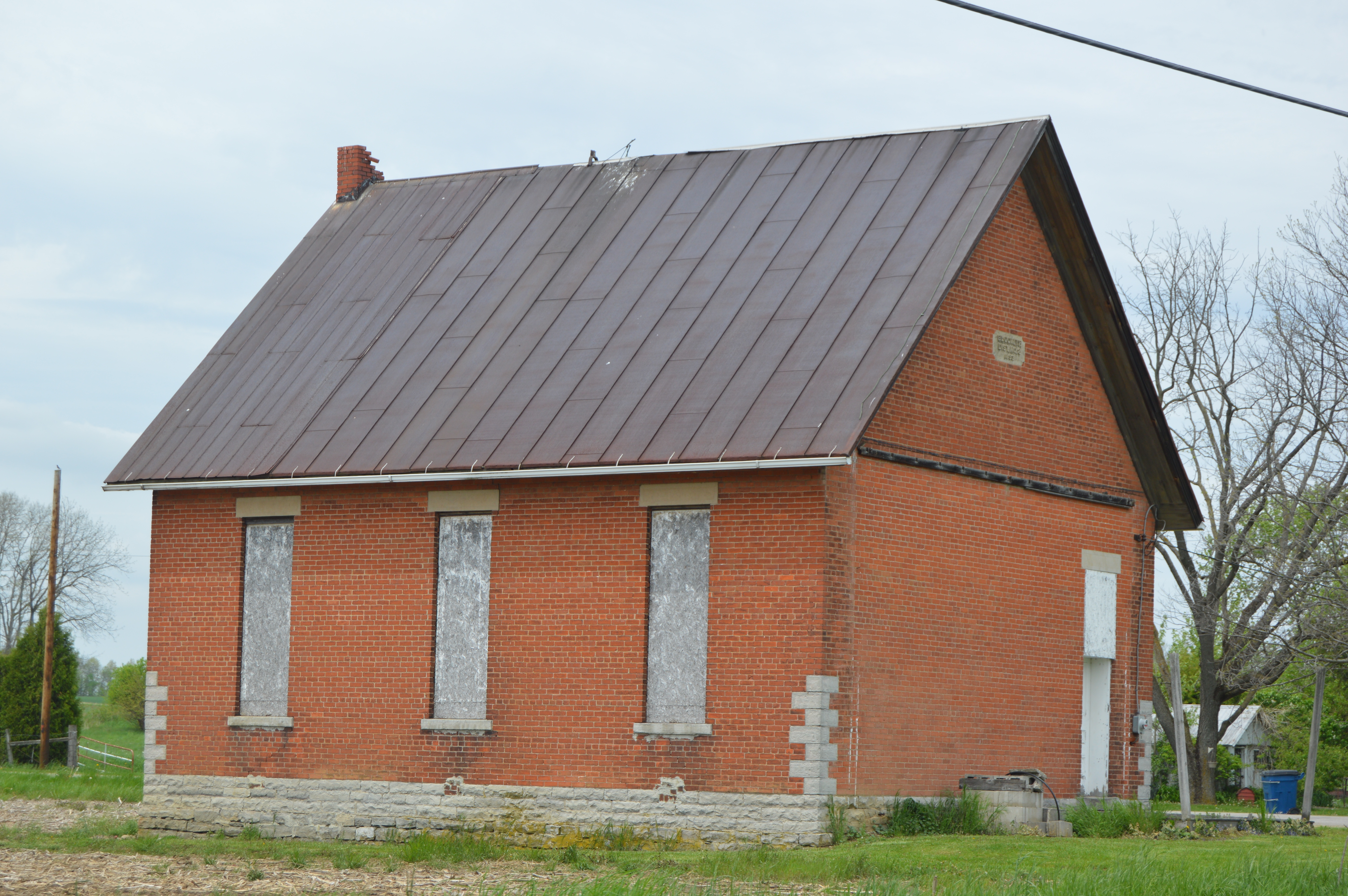
- Former school north of Bloomville

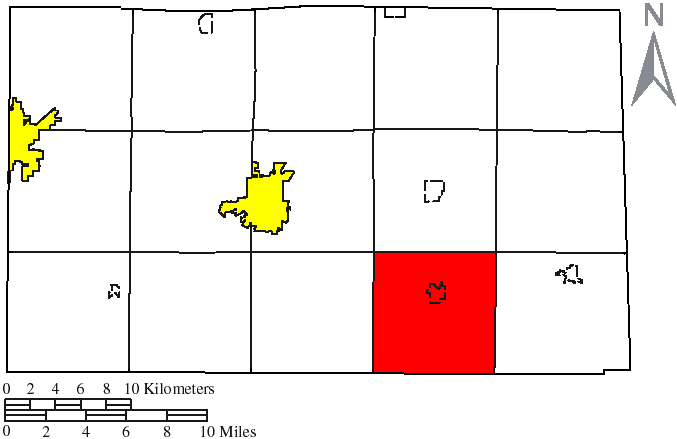
- Location of Bloom Township in Seneca County.
- Coordinates: 41°2′46″N 83°0′46″W
- Country: United States
- State: Ohio
- County: Seneca

Area
  - Total: 36.4 sq mi (94.4 km^{2})
  - Land: 36.4 sq mi (94.2 km^{2})
  - Water: 0.077 sq mi (0.2 km^{2})
- Elevation: 912 ft (278 m)

Population (2020)
  - Total: 1,624
  - Density: 45/sq mi (17.2/km^{2})
- Time zone: UTC-5 (Eastern (EST))
  - Summer (DST): UTC-4 (EDT)
- FIPS code: 39-07006
- GNIS feature ID: 1086942

Bloom Township is one of the fifteen townships of Seneca County, Ohio, United States. The 2020 census found 1,624 people in the township.

== Geography ==
Located in the southeastern part of the county, it borders the following townships:

- Scipio Township - north
- Reed Township - northeast corner
- Venice Township - east
- Chatfield Township, Crawford County - southeast
- Lykens Township, Crawford County - south
- Texas Township, Crawford County - southwest corner
- Eden Township - west
- Clinton Township - northwest corner

The village of Bloomville is located in central Bloom Township.

== Name and history ==
Bloom Township was organized in 1824. It was named from its scenic rustic setting.

Statewide, other Bloom Townships are located in Fairfield, Morgan, Scioto, and Wood counties.

== Government ==
The township is governed by a three-member board of trustees, who are elected in November of odd-numbered years to a four-year term beginning on the following January 1. Two are elected in the year after the presidential election and one is elected in the year before it. There is also an elected township fiscal officer, who serves a four-year term beginning on April 1 of the year after the election, which is held in November of the year before the presidential election. Vacancies in the fiscal officership or on the board of trustees are filled by the remaining trustees.
