= Broken Sword Creek =

River in Ohio, US

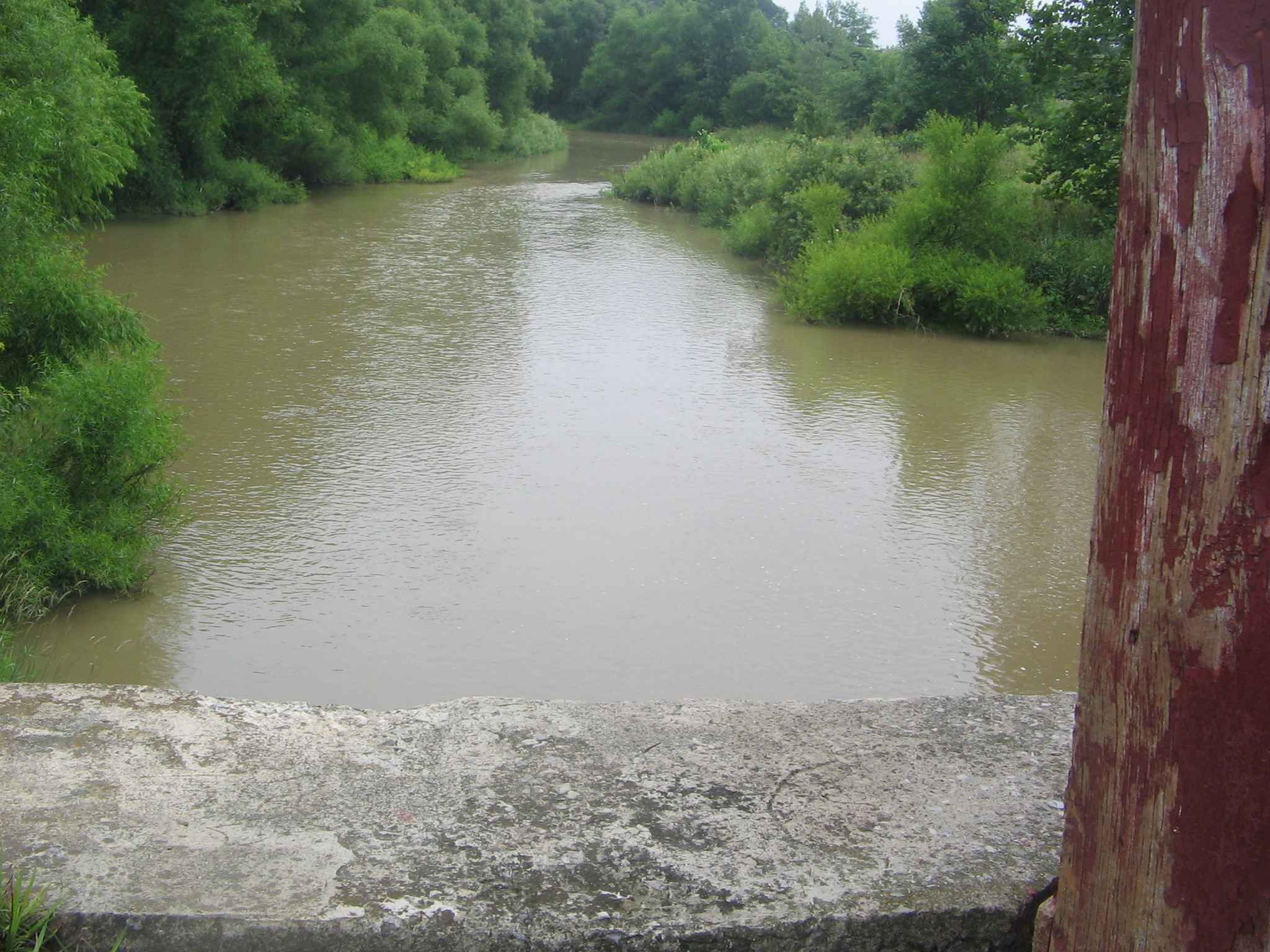
- Broken Sword Creek in Wyandot County and Crawford County, Ohio

Location
- Country: United States of America

Physical characteristics
- Source
  - location: Crawford County, Ohio
  - coordinates: 40°53′18″N 82°45′20″W
  - elevation: 1,140 ft (350 m)
- Mouth
  - location: Sandusky River, Wyandot County, Ohio
  - coordinates: 40°46′10″N 83°10′56″W
  - elevation: 860 ft (260 m)

Broken Sword Creek in Wyandot County and Crawford County, Ohio is a 37.1-mile-long (59.7 km) tributary of the Sandusky River.

Legend states the name is derived from an incident when William Crawford broke his sword at the creek bank in order to render it useless to Native Americans who were pursuing him.

== Tributaries ==
- Brandywine Creek (Broken Sword Creek)

== See also ==
- List of rivers of Ohio
