= New Winchester, Ohio =

Coordinates: 40°43′08″N 82°55′09″W

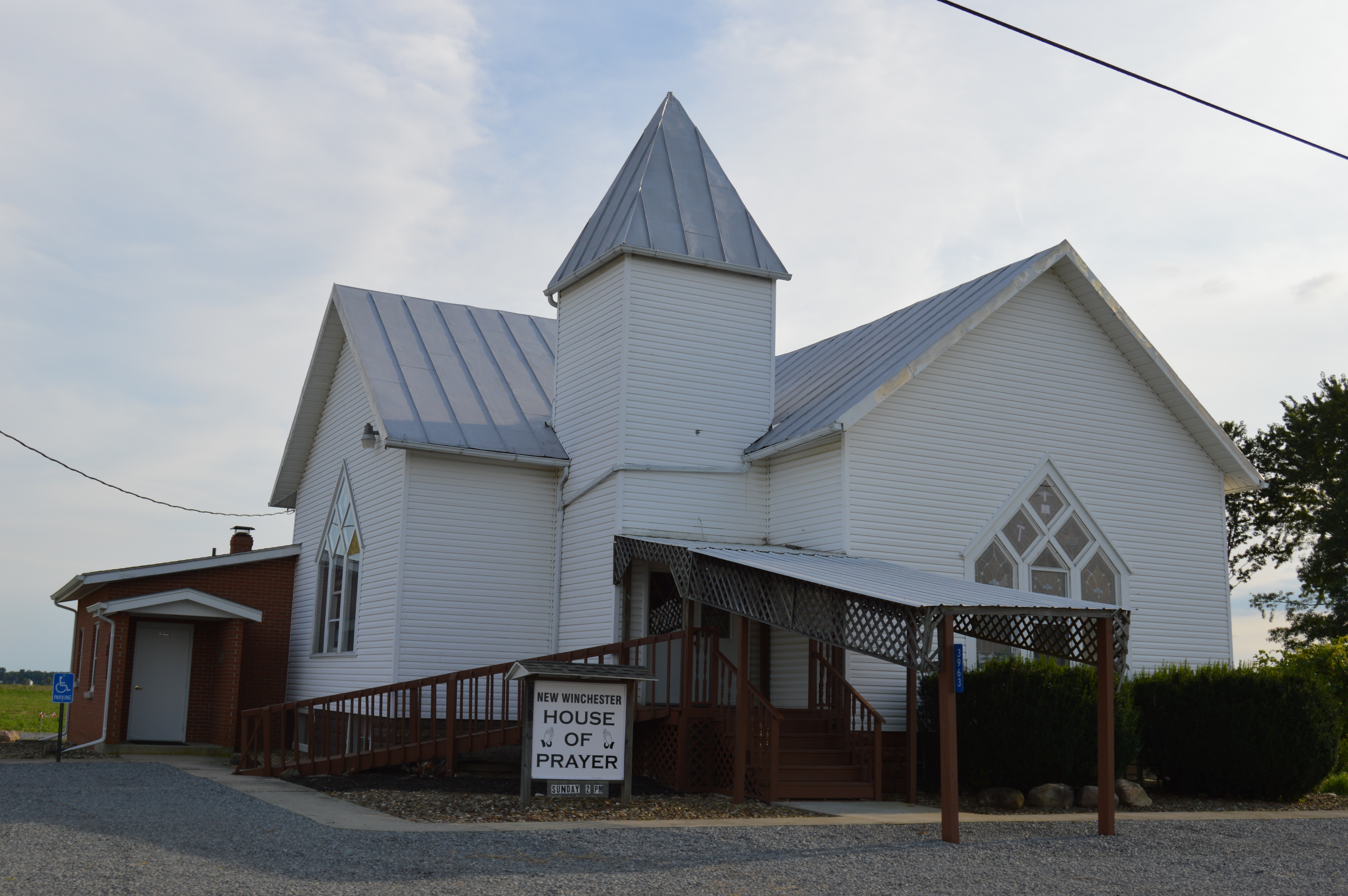
New Winchester House of Prayer

New Winchester is an unincorporated community in Whetstone Township, Crawford County, Ohio, United States.

== History ==
New Winchester was laid out in 1835.
