= Lykens Township, Crawford County, Ohio =

Township in Ohio, US

- Township
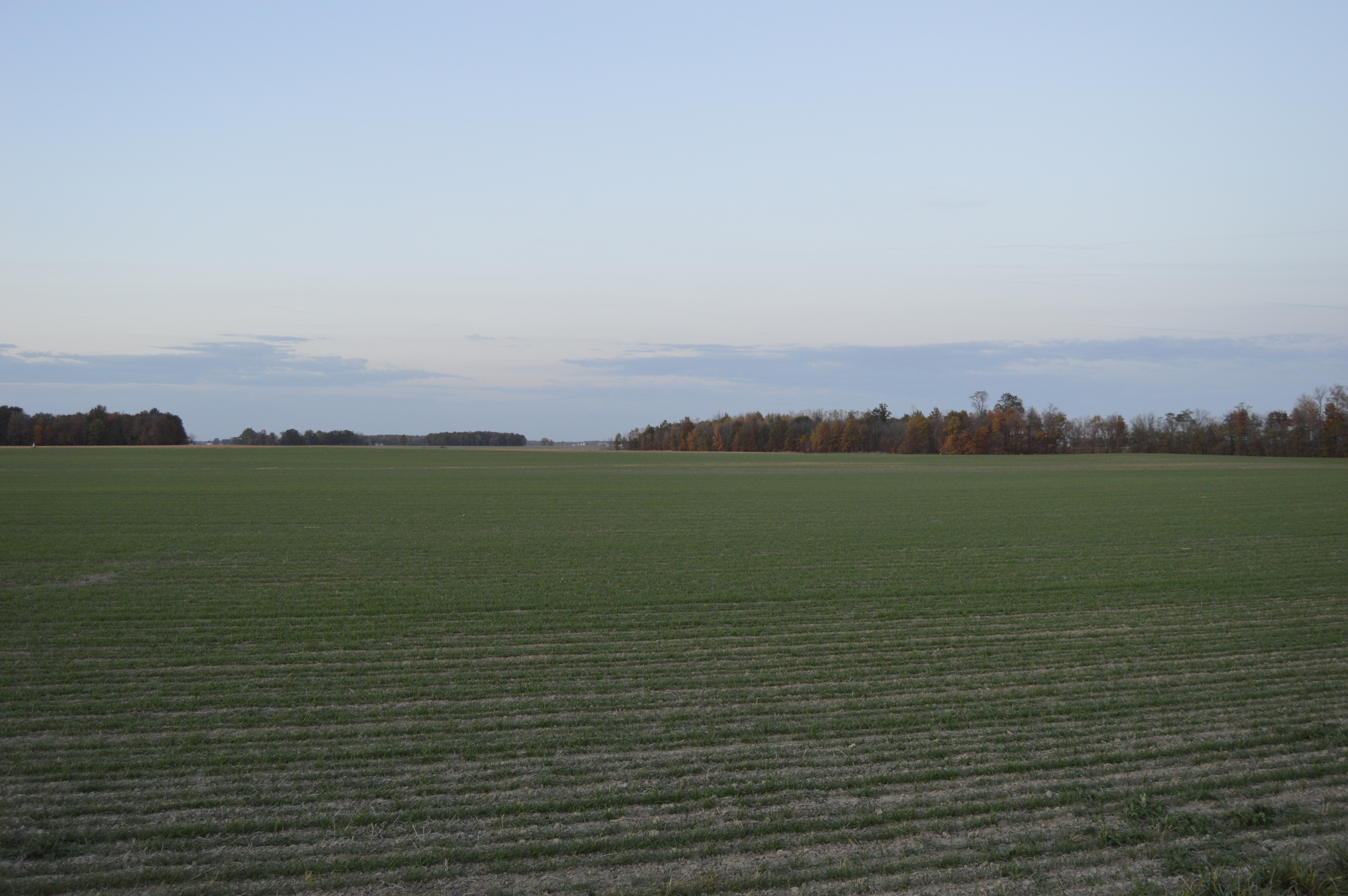
- Fields on State Route 103 south of Lykens

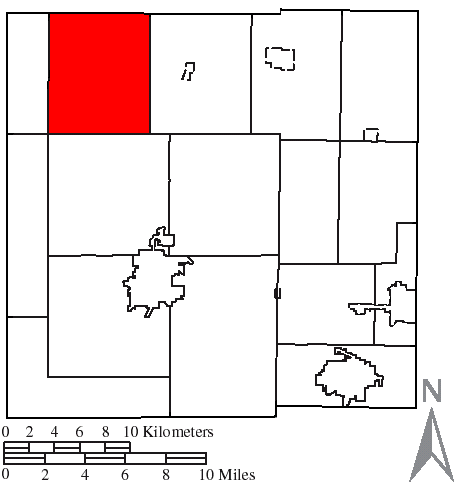
- Location of Lykens Township in Crawford County
- Coordinates: 40°56′36″N 83°1′34″W
- Country: United States
- State: Ohio
- County: Crawford

Area
  - Total: 30.2 sq mi (78.3 km^{2})
  - Land: 30.2 sq mi (78.3 km^{2})
  - Water: 0 sq mi (0.0 km^{2})
- Elevation: 971 ft (296 m)

Population (2020)
  - Total: 589
  - Density: 19.5/sq mi (7.52/km^{2})
- Time zone: UTC-5 (Eastern (EST))
  - Summer (DST): UTC-4 (EDT)
- FIPS code: 39-45500
- GNIS feature ID: 1085942

Lykens Township is one of the sixteen townships of Crawford County, Ohio, United States. As of the 2020 census the population was 589.

== Geography ==
Located in the northwestern part of the county, it borders the following townships:

- Bloom Township, Seneca County - north
- Chatfield Township - east
- Holmes Township - south
- Tod Township - southwest corner
- Texas Township - west
- Eden Township, Seneca County - northwest corner

No municipalities are located in Lykens Township, although the unincorporated communities of Brokensword and Lykens lie on the border with Holmes Township and in the township's center, respectively.

== Name and history ==
Lykens Township was founded in about 1832. It was named after Lykens, Pennsylvania.

It is the only Lykens Township statewide.

== Government ==
The township is governed by a three-member board of trustees, who are elected in November of odd-numbered years to a four-year term beginning on the following January 1. Two are elected in the year after the presidential election and one is elected in the year prior. There is also an elected township fiscal officer, who serves a four-year term beginning on April 1 of the year after the election, which is held in November of the year before the presidential election. Vacancies in the fiscal officership or on the board of trustees are filled by the remaining trustees.
