= Sandusky Township, Crawford County, Ohio =

Township in Ohio, US

- Township
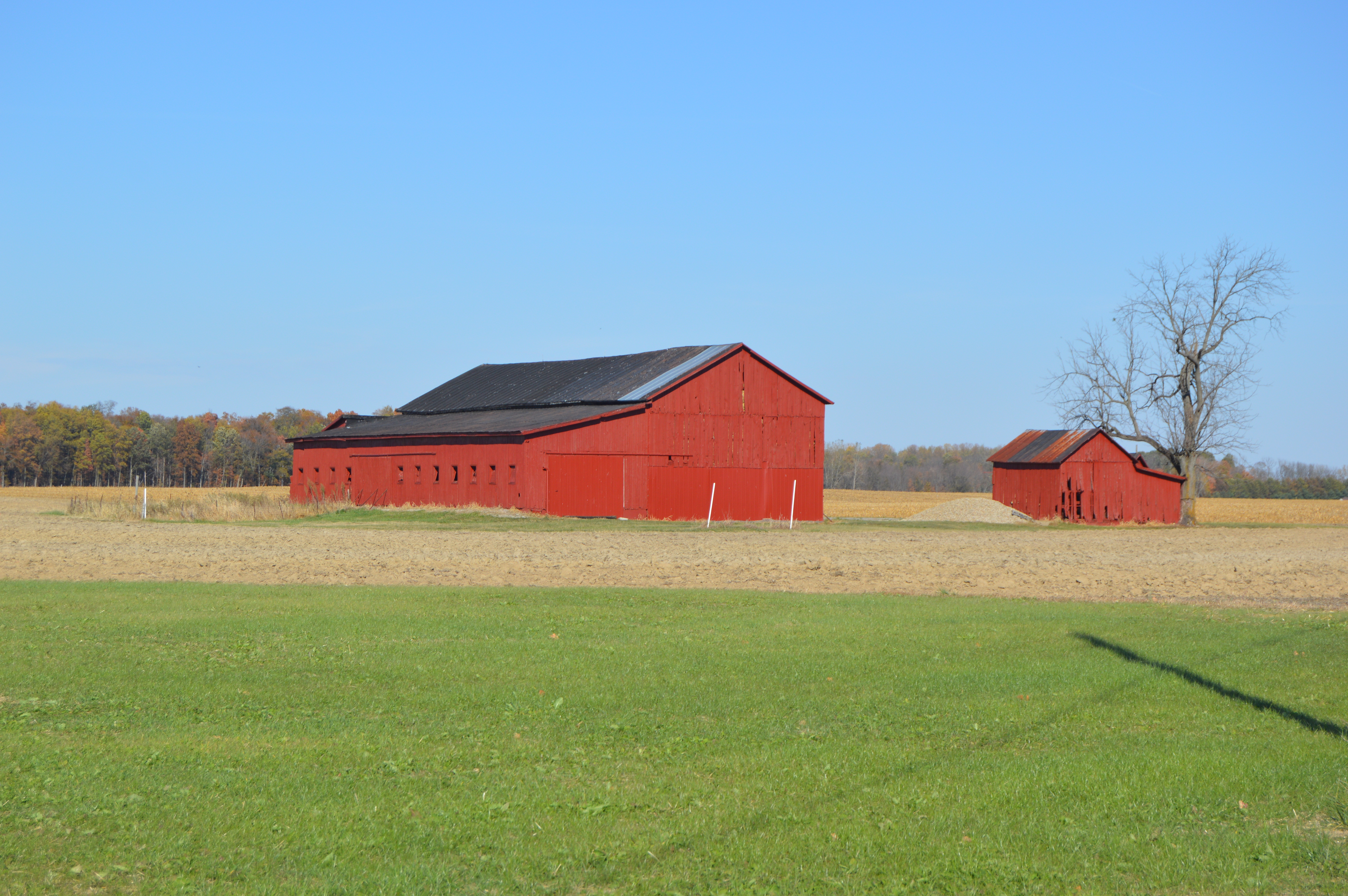
- Farmstead on State Route 96

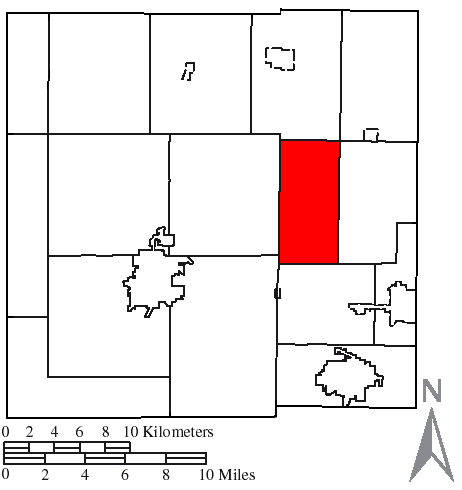
- Location of Sandusky Township in Crawford County
- Coordinates: 40°51′5″N 82°49′22″W
- Country: United States
- State: Ohio
- County: Crawford

Area
  - Total: 17.92 sq mi (46.42 km^{2})
  - Land: 17.91 sq mi (46.39 km^{2})
  - Water: 0.012 sq mi (0.03 km^{2})
- Elevation: 1,030 ft (314 m)

Population (2020)
  - Total: 437
  - Density: 24.4/sq mi (9.42/km^{2})
- Time zone: UTC-5 (Eastern (EST))
  - Summer (DST): UTC-4 (EDT)
- FIPS code: 39-70366
- GNIS feature ID: 1085944

Sandusky Township is one of the sixteen townships of Crawford County, Ohio, United States. As of the 2020 census the population was 437.

== Geography ==
Located in the eastern part of the county, it borders the following townships:

- Cranberry Township - north
- Auburn Township - northeast corner
- Vernon Township - east
- Jefferson Township - south
- Whetstone Township - southwest
- Liberty Township - west

No municipalities are located in Sandusky Township.

== Name and history ==
Sandusky Township was named from the Sandusky River, which flows through its southern part.

Statewide, other Sandusky Townships are located in Richland and Sandusky counties.

== Government ==
The township is governed by a three-member board of trustees, who are elected in November of odd-numbered years to a four-year term beginning on the following January 1. Two are elected in the year after the presidential election and one is elected in the year before it. There is also an elected township fiscal officer, who serves a four-year term beginning on April 1 of the year after the election, which is held in November of the year before the presidential election. Vacancies in the fiscal officership or on the board of trustees are filled by the remaining trustees.
