= Venice Township, Seneca County, Ohio =

Township in Ohio, US

- Township
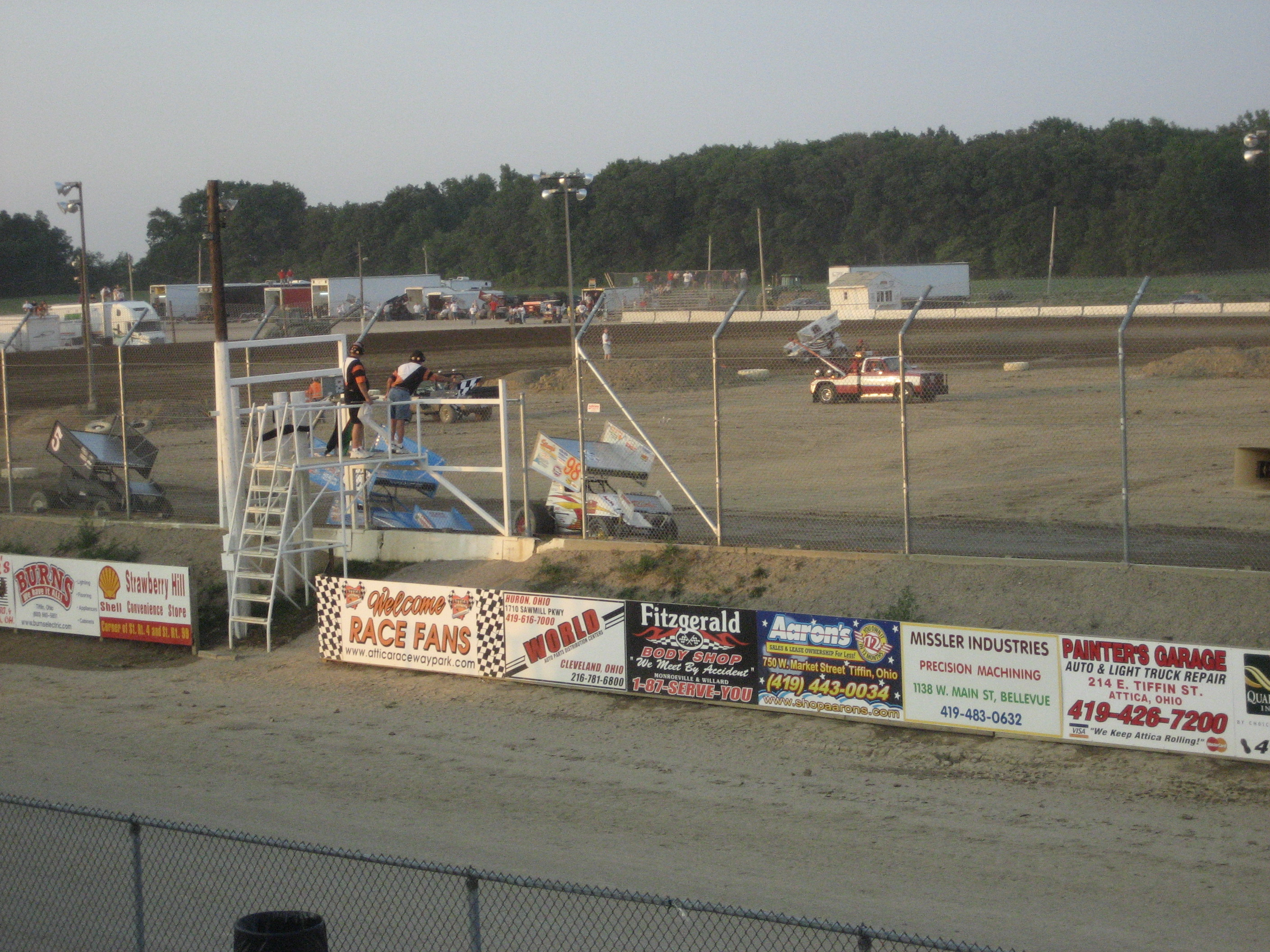
- Racing at Attica Raceway Park, just east of Attica

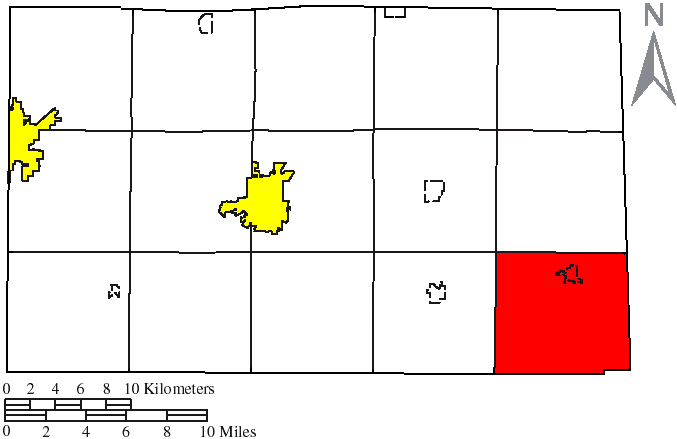
- Location of Venice Township in Seneca County.
- Coordinates: 41°3′4″N 82°53′27″W
- Country: United States
- State: Ohio
- County: Seneca

Area
  - Total: 39.6 sq mi (102.6 km^{2})
  - Land: 39.6 sq mi (102.6 km^{2})
  - Water: 0 sq mi (0.0 km^{2})
- Elevation: 928 ft (283 m)

Population (2020)
  - Total: 1,683
  - Density: 42.48/sq mi (16.40/km^{2})
- Time zone: UTC-5 (Eastern (EST))
  - Summer (DST): UTC-4 (EDT)
- FIPS code: 39-79674
- GNIS feature ID: 1086957

Venice Township is one of the fifteen townships of Seneca County, Ohio, United States. The 2020 census found 1,683 people in the township.

== Geography ==
Located in the southeastern corner of the county, it borders the following townships:

- Reed Township - north
- Norwich Township, Huron County - northeast
- Richmond Township, Huron County - east
- Cranberry Township, Crawford County - southeast
- Chatfield Township, Crawford County - southwest
- Bloom Township - west
- Scipio Township - northwest corner

The village of Attica is located in northern Venice Township, and the unincorporated community of Caroline is located in the township's center.

== Name and history ==
It is the only Venice Township statewide.

Venice Township was organized in 1829.

== Government ==
The township is governed by a three-member board of trustees, who are elected in November of odd-numbered years to a four-year term beginning on the following January 1. Two are elected in the year after the presidential election and one is elected in the year before it. There is also an elected township fiscal officer, who serves a four-year term beginning on April 1 of the year after the election, which is held in November of the year before the presidential election. Vacancies in the fiscal officership or on the board of trustees are filled by the remaining trustees.
